= 2016–17 Elitserien (bandy) =

2016–17 Elitserien season
- League: Elitserien
- Sport: Bandy
- Duration: 21 October 2016 – 17 February 2017 (regular league); 23 February – 25 March 2017 (championship play-off)
- Number of teams: 14
- TV partner(s): Sveriges Television

Regular season

Final
- Champions: Edsbyns IF
- Runners-up: Bollnäs GIF

Elitserien seasons
- ← 2015–16 2017–18 →

The 2016–17 Elitserien was the tenth season of the present highest Swedish men's bandy top division, Elitserien. The regular season began on 21 October 2016, and the final was played at Tele2 Arena in Stockholm on 25 March 2017. Edsbyns IF won the Swedish national championship title by defeating Bollnäs GIF, 3–1, in the final game, thereby securing Edsbyn's tenth championship title, making the club alone the third most successful Swedish bandy club so far.

== Teams ==
Locations of the 2016–17 Elitserien teams

Teams 1–10 from the regular 2015–16 Elitserien league were automatically qualified for this season's play in the top-tier divisionen. All four teams from the 2015/2016 season which played the qualification games (IK Sirius, Gripen Trollhättan BK, Kalix BF and TB Västerås) managed to stay in the Elitserien.

Club	Home town	Home ice
Bollnäs GIF	Bollnäs	Sävstaås IP
Broberg/Söderhamn Bandy	Söderhamn	Hällåsen
Edsbyns IF	Edsbyn	Svenska Fönster Arena*
Gripen Trollhättan BK	Trollhättan	Slättbergshallen*
Hammarby IF	Stockholm	Zinkensdamms IP
Kalix BF	Kalix	Kalix IP
Sandvikens AIK	Sandviken	Göransson Arena*
IK Sirius	Uppsala	Studenternas IP
IK Tellus	Stockholm	Zinkensdamms IP
Tillberga Bandy Västerås	Västerås	ABB Arena Syd*
Vetlanda BK	Vetlanda	Sapa Arena*
Villa Lidköping BK	Lidköping	Sparbanken Lidköping Arena*
IFK Vänersborg	Vänersborg	Arena Vänersborg*
Västerås SK	Västerås	ABB Arena Syd*

* – indoor arena

== Results ==
=== League table ===
Pos	Team	Pld	W	D	L	GF	GA	GD	Pts	
1	Villa Lidköping BK	26	19	4	3	165	88	+77	42	Advance to Knock-out stage
2	Edsbyns IF	26	19	4	3	133	89	+44	42	Advance to Knock-out stage
3	Bollnäs GIF	26	15	7	4	119	70	+49	37	Advance to Knock-out stage
4	Sandvikens AIK	26	17	1	8	158	99	+59	35	Advance to Knock-out stage
5	Västerås SK	26	16	2	8	126	87	+39	34	Advance to Knock-out stage
6	IFK Vänersborg	26	14	3	9	137	106	+31	31	Advance to Knock-out stage
7	Broberg/Söderhamn	26	14	2	10	104	96	+8	30	Advance to Knock-out stage
8	Hammarby IF	26	11	6	9	112	107	+5	28	Advance to Knock-out stage
9	Vetlanda BK	26	11	2	13	135	131	+4	24	
10	IK Sirius	26	9	3	14	82	128	−46	21	
11	TB Västerås	26	8	3	15	83	121	−38	19	Qualification to Relegation playoffs
12	Gripen Trollhättan BK	26	5	1	20	69	129	−60	11	Qualification to Relegation playoffs
13	IK Tellus	26	2	4	20	52	140	−88	8	Qualification to Relegation playoffs
14	Kalix Bandy	26	1	3	22	70	154	−84	5	Qualification to Relegation playoffs

Updated to match(es) played on 17 February 2017. Source:

=== Knock-out stage ===
The quarter finals and the semi-finals are played in best of five games, interchangeably on home ice and away ice, while the final is one game played in Stockholm, the Swedish capital.

==== Quarter-finals ====
===== Villa Lidköping BK – IFK Vänersborg =====
23 February 2017
19.00 CET

Villa Lidköping BK	7–2	IFK Vänersborg
	Report

Sparbanken Lidköping Arena
Attendance: 4,532
25 February 2017
19.00 CET

IFK Vänersborg	4–9	Villa Lidköping BK
	Report

Arena Vänersborg
Attendance: 3,583
27 February 2017
19.00 CET

Villa Lidköping BK	5–2	IFK Vänersborg
	Report

Sparbanken Lidköping Arena
Attendance: 4,196

===== Bollnäs GIF – Hammarby IF =====
23 February 2017
19.00 CET

Bollnäs GIF	2–3	Hammarby IF
	Report

Sävstaås IP
Attendance: 1,727
25 February 2017
19.00 CET

Hammarby IF	2–5	Bollnäs GIF
	Report

Zinkensdamms IP
Attendance: 3,564
27 February 2017
19.00 CET

Bollnäs GIF	3–2	Hammarby IF
	Report

Sävstaås IP
Attendance: 1,815
2 March 2017
19.00 CET

Hammarby IF	1–3	Bollnäs GIF
	Report

Zinkensdamms IP
Attendance: 2,855

===== Edsbyns IF – Broberg/Söderhamn Bandy =====
24 February 2017
19.00 CET

Edsbyns IF	6–3	Broberg/Söderhamn Bandy
	Report

Svenska Fönster Arena
Attendance: 1,857
26 February 2017
17.00 CET

Broberg/Söderhamn Bandy	5–4	Edsbyns IF
	Report

Hällåsens IP
Attendance: 1,753
28 February 2017
19.00 CET

Edsbyns IF	7–4	Broberg/Söderhamn Bandy
	Report

Svenska Fönster Arena
Attendance: 1,824
2 March 2017
19.00 CET

Broberg/Söderhamn Bandy	0–6	Edsbyns IF
	Report

Hällåsens IP
Attendance: 1,585

===== Sandvikens AIK – Västerås SK =====
24 February 2017
19.00 CET

Sandvikens AIK	1–2 (a.e.t.)	Västerås SK
	Report

Göransson Arena
Attendance: 1,903
25 February 2017
19.00 CET

Västerås SK	4–5	Sandvikens AIK
	Report

ABB Arena
Attendance: 3,779
28 February 2017
19.00 CET

Sandvikens AIK	6–4	Västerås SK
	Report

Göransson Arena
Attendance: 2,403
2 March 2017
19.00 CET

Västerås SK	6–4	Sandvikens AIK
	Report

ABB Arena
Attendance: 3,021
4 March 2017
18.00 CET

Sandvikens AIK	3–2	Västerås SK
	Report

Göransson Arena
Attendance: 3,148

==== Semi-finals ====
===== Villa Lidköping BK – Bollnäs GIF =====
8 March 2017
19.00 CET

Villa Lidköping BK	4–5 (a.e.t.)	Bollnäs GIF
	Report

Sparbanken Lidköping Arena
Attendance: 4,314
11 March 2017
20.00 CET

Bollnäs GIF	3–0	Villa Lidköping BK
	Report

Sävstaås IP
Attendance: 2,124
14 March 2017
19.00 CET

Villa Lidköping BK	4–5	Bollnäs GIF
	Report

Sparbanken Lidköping Arena
Attendance: 4,251

===== Edsbyns IF – Sandvikens AIK =====
9 March 2017
19.00 CET

Edsbyns IF	4–8	Sandvikens AIK
	Report

Svenska Fönster Arena
Attendance: 1,820
11 March 2017
17.00 CET

Sandvikens AIK	6–7 (a.e.t.)	Edsbyns IF
	Report

Göransson Arena
Attendance: 2,880
15 March 2017
19.00 CET

Edsbyns IF	2–7	Sandvikens AIK
	Report

Svenska Fönster Arena
Attendance: 2,110
17 March 2017
19.00 CET

Sandvikens AIK	2–3 (a.e.t.)	Edsbyns IF
	Report

Göransson Arena
Attendance: 3,257
19 March 2017
17.00 CET

Edsbyns IF	5–2	Sandvikens AIK
	Report

Svenska Fönster Arena
Attendance: 2,913

==== Final ====
25 March 2017
15.30 CET

Edsbyns IF	3–1	Bollnäs GIF
Määttä 4', 85'; Hammarström 84' (p)	Report	Wik 19'

Tele2 Arena
Attendance: 16,836
Referee: Ulrik Bergman

== Season statistics ==
=== Top scorers ===
As of end of season.

Rank	Player	Club	Goals
1	(Sweden) David Karlsson	Villa Lidköping BK	56
2	(Sweden) Christoffer Edlund	Sandvikens AIK	48
3	(Sweden) Erik Pettersson	Sandvikens AIK	47
4	(Sweden) Patrik Nilsson	Bollnäs GIF	46
5	(Sweden) Joakim Hedqvist	IFK Vänersborg	44
6	(Sweden) Joakim Andersson	Vetlanda BK	43
7	(Sweden) Daniel Andersson	Villa Lidköping BK	37
8	(Russia) Sergey Lomanov	IFK Vänersborg	30
9	(Sweden) Martin Söderberg	Broberg/Söderhamn Bandy	29
9	(Sweden) Adam Rudell	Gripen Trollhättan BK	29
