= 2015–16 Elitserien (bandy) =

2015–16 Elitserien season
- League: Elitserien
- Sport: Bandy
- Duration: 23 October 2015 – 19 March 2016
- Teams: 14
- TV partner(s): TV4 and TV4 Sport

Regular season

Final
- Champions: Västerås SK
- Runners-up: Villa Lidköping BK

Elitserien seasons
- 2014–15 2016–17

The 2015–16 Elitserien was the ninth season of the present highest Swedish men's bandy top division, Elitserien. The regular season began on 23 October 2015, and the final was played at Tele2 Arena in Stockholm on 19 March 2016. Västerås SK won the Swedish national championship title by defeating Villa Lidköping BK, 5–2, in the final game.

== Summary ==
The league started on 23 October 2015.

== Teams ==
Locations of the 2015–16 Elitserien teams

Team	Location	Home stadium
Bollnäs GIF	Bollnäs	Sävstaås IP
Broberg/Söderhamn Bandy	Söderhamn	Hällåsen
Edsbyns IF	Edsbyn	Dina Arena
Gripen Trollhättan BK	Trollhättan	Slättbergshallen
Hammarby IF	Stockholm	Zinkensdamms IP
IFK Kungälv	Kungälv	Skarpe Nord
Kalix BF	Kalix	Kalix IP
Sandvikens AIK	Sandviken	Göransson Arena
IK Sirius	Uppsala	Studenternas IP
TB Västerås	Västerås	ABB Arena
Vetlanda BK	Vetlanda	Sapa Arena
Villa Lidköping BK	Lidköping	Sparbanken Lidköping Arena
IFK Vänersborg	Vänersborg	Arena Vänersborg
Västerås SK	Västerås	ABB Arena

== League table ==
Pos	Team	Pld	W	D	L	GF	GA	GD	Pts	
1	Västerås SK	26	21	0	5	159	85	+74	42	Advance to Knock-out stage
2	Villa Lidköping BK	26	19	2	5	140	77	+63	40	Advance to Knock-out stage
3	Bollnäs GIF	26	18	3	5	132	81	+51	39	Advance to Knock-out stage
4	Sandvikens AIK	26	17	4	5	165	111	+54	38	Advance to Knock-out stage
5	Vetlanda BK	26	15	1	10	125	124	+1	31	Advance to Knock-out stage
6	Hammarby IF	26	12	6	8	120	95	+25	30	Advance to Knock-out stage
7	Edsbyns IF	26	13	3	10	121	99	+22	29	Advance to Knock-out stage
8	IFK Vänersborg	26	12	4	10	120	110	+10	28	Advance to Knock-out stage
9	Broberg/Söderhamn	26	11	2	13	100	117	−17	24	
10	IFK Kungälv	26	9	3	14	104	115	−11	21	
11	Kalix Bandy	26	7	4	15	84	124	−40	18	Qualification to Relegation playoffs
12	TB Västerås	26	6	1	19	111	160	−49	13	Qualification to Relegation playoffs
13	IK Sirius	26	4	0	22	68	152	−84	8	Qualification to Relegation playoffs
14	Gripen Trollhättan BK	26	1	1	24	64	163	−99	3	Qualification to Relegation playoffs

Updated to match(es) played on 27 October 2015. Source:

=== Knock-out stage ===
Quarter-finals
Västerås SK	5	4	7
IFK Vänersborg	2	3	2
Sandvikens AIK	8	7	6	2	8
Hammarby IF	4	3	7	3	3
Villa Lidköping BK	7	8	9
Vetlanda BK	2	2	4
Bollnäs GIF	1	7	4	5	5
Edsbyns IF	3	3	5	4	2

Semi-finals
Västerås SK	11	4	4	8	8
Sandvikens AIK	3	12	9	4	4
Villa Lidköping BK	8	7	7	3
Bollnäs GIF	1	8	3	2

Final
19 March – Stockholm
Västerås SK	5
Villa Lidköping BK	2

==== Final ====
19 March 2016
16:00 UTC+1

Västerås SK	5–2	Villa Lidköping BK
Jansson; Holmberg; Bergström; Sjöström; Gröhn	Report	Karlsson; Esplund

Tele2 Arena, Stockholm

== Season statistics ==
=== Top scorers ===
As of end of season.

Rank	Player	Club	Goals
1	(Sweden) Christoffer Edlund	Sandvikens AIK	59
2	(Sweden) David Karlsson	Villa Lidköping BK	54
3	(Sweden) Erik Pettersson	Sandvikens AIK	45
3	(Sweden) Joakim Andersson	Vetlanda BK	45
5	(Sweden) Joakim Hedqvist	IFK Vänersborg	44
5	(Sweden) Martin Söderberg	Broberg/Söderhamn Bandy	44
7	(Sweden) Christian Mickelsson	Bollnäs GIF	36
8	(Sweden) Daniel Andersson	Villa Lidköping BK	28
9	(Sweden) Jonas Nilsson	Västerås SK	27
9	(Sweden) Ted Bergström	Västerås SK	27
