= 2017–18 Elitserien (bandy) =

2017–18 Elitserien season
- League: Elitserien
- Sport: Bandy
- Duration: 25 October 2017 – 13 February 2018 (Regular season); 16 February 2018 – 17 March 2018 (Final stage)
- Number of teams: 14
- TV partner(s): SVT

Regular season
- League winners: Sandvikens AIK

Final
- Champions: Edsbyns IF
- Runners-up: Sandvikens AIK

Elitserien seasons
- ← 2016–17 2018–19 →

The 2017–18 Elitserien is the eleventh season of the present highest Swedish men's bandy top division, Elitserien. The regular season begins in late-October 2017.

== Teams ==
Locations of the 2017–18 Elitserien teams

Teams 1–10 from the regular 2016–17 Elitserien league were automatically qualified for this season's play in the top-tier divisionen. Three teams from the 2016–2017 season which played the qualification games (IK Tellus, Kalix BF och TB Västerås) managed to stay in the Elitserien, while Gripen Trollhättan BK was relegated to second-tier Allsvenskan and replaced by IFK Motala.

Club	Home town	Home ice
Bollnäs GIF	Bollnäs	Sävstaås IP
Broberg/Söderhamn Bandy	Söderhamn	Hällåsen
Edsbyns IF	Edsbyn	Svenska Fönster Arena*
Hammarby IF	Stockholm	Zinkensdamms IP
Kalix BF	Kalix	Kalix IP
IFK Motala	Motala	XL-Bygg Arena
Sandvikens AIK	Sandviken	Göransson Arena*
IK Sirius	Uppsala	Studenternas IP
IK Tellus	Stockholm	Zinkensdamms IP
Tillberga Bandy Västerås	Västerås	ABB Arena Syd*
Vetlanda BK	Vetlanda	Sapa Arena*
Villa Lidköping BK	Lidköping	Sparbanken Lidköping Arena*
IFK Vänersborg	Vänersborg	Arena Vänersborg*
Västerås SK	Västerås	ABB Arena Syd*

* – indoor arena

== League table ==
Pos	Team	Pld	W	D	L	GF	GA	GD	Pts	
1	Sandvikens AIK	26	19	3	4	166	78	+88	41	Advance to Knock-out stage
2	Edsbyns IF	26	20	1	5	145	72	+73	41	Advance to Knock-out stage
3	Hammarby IF	26	18	3	5	168	93	+75	39	Advance to Knock-out stage
4	Västerås SK	26	17	5	4	149	83	+66	39	Advance to Knock-out stage
5	Villa Lidköping BK	26	17	4	5	140	69	+71	38	Advance to Knock-out stage
6	Vetlanda BK	26	14	3	9	151	118	+33	31	Advance to Knock-out stage
7	Bollnäs GIF	26	10	6	10	92	98	−6	26	Advance to Knock-out stage
8	IFK Vänersborg	26	11	2	13	104	96	+8	24	Advance to Knock-out stage
9	Broberg/Söderhamn IF	26	7	9	10	104	122	−18	23	
10	IK Tellus	26	4	8	14	84	135	−51	16	
11	IK Sirius	26	5	6	15	73	131	−58	16	
12	IFK Motala	26	5	4	17	84	143	−59	14	Qualification to Relegation playoffs
13	Kalix Bandy	26	3	5	18	58	143	−85	11	Qualification to Relegation playoffs
14	TB Västerås	26	1	3	22	69	206	−137	5	Relegation to the Allsvenskan

Updated to match(es) played on 13 February 2018. Source: svenskbandy.se

== Knock-out stage ==
=== Bracket ===
Quarterfinals
1	Sandvikens AIK	6	4	7
8	IFK Vänersborg	2	2	5
3	Hammarby IF	6	4	11	5	7
6	Vetlanda BK	2	5	2	7	2
2	Edsbyns IF	8	4	8
7	Bollnäs GIF	4	0	3
4	Västerås SK	3	3	7	1
5	Villa Lidköping BK	4	8	1	5

Semifinals
1	Sandvikens AIK	5	3	3	5	3
3	Hammarby IF	2	6	7	3	2
2	Edsbyns IF	1	3	6	5	5
5	Villa Lidköping BK	3	8	4	3	3

Finals
1	Sandvikens AIK	0
2	Edsbyns IF	4

=== Quarter-finals ===
==== Sandvikens AIK vs IFK Vänersborg ====
16 February
19:00 CET

Sandvikens AIK	6–2	IFK Vänersborg

18 February
17:00 CET

IFK Vänersborg	2–4	Sandvikens AIK

20 February
19:00 CET

Sandvikens AIK	7–5	IFK Vänersborg

==== Hammarby IF vs Vetlanda BK ====
16 February
19:00 CET

Hammarby IF	6–2	Vetlanda BK

18 February
17:00 CET

Vetlanda BK	5–4	Hammarby IF

20 February
19:00 CET

Hammarby IF	11–2	Vetlanda BK

22 February
19:00 CET

Vetlanda BK	7–5	Hammarby IF

25 February
13:15 CET

Hammarby IF	7–2	Vetlanda BK

==== Edsbyns IF vs Bollnäs GIF ====
16 February
19:00 CET

Edsbyns IF	8–4	Bollnäs GIF

18 February
17:00 CET

Bollnäs GIF	0–4	Edsbyns IF

21 February
19:00 CET

Edsbyns IF	8–3	Bollnäs GIF

==== Västerås SK vs Villa Lidköping BK ====
16 February
19:00 CET

Västerås SK	3–4	Villa Lidköping BK

18 February
17:00 CET

Villa Lidköping BK	8–3	Västerås SK

21 February
19:00 CET

Västerås SK	7–1	Villa Lidköping BK

23 February
19:00 CET

Villa Lidköping BK	5–1	Västerås SK

=== Semi-finals ===
==== Sandvikens AIK vs Hammarby IF ====
28 February
19:00 CET

Sandvikens AIK	5–2	Hammarby IF

2 March
19:00 CET

Hammarby IF	6–3	Sandvikens AIK

6 March
19:00 CET

Sandvikens AIK	3–7	Hammarby IF

9 March
19:00 CET

Hammarby IF	3–5	Sandvikens AIK

11 March
15:00 CET

Sandvikens AIK	3–2	Hammarby IF

==== Edsbyns IF vs Villa Lidköping BK ====
28 February
19:00 CET

Edsbyns IF	1–3	Villa Lidköping BK

3 March
17:00 CET

Villa Lidköping BK	8–3	Edsbyns IF

7 March
19:00 CET

Edsbyns IF	6–4	Villa Lidköping BK

9 March
19:00 CET

Villa Lidköping BK	3–5	Edsbyns IF

11 March
17:00 CET

Edsbyns IF	5–3	Villa Lidköping BK

=== Final ===
17 March
16:00 CET

Sandvikens AIK	0–4	Edsbyns IF

Studenternas IP, Uppsala
