= 2017–18 in Swedish bandy =

2017–18 in Swedish bandy was a bandy season starting in August 2017 and ending in July 2018.

== Domestic results ==
=== Men's bandy ===
==== 2017–18 Elitserien ====
Pos	Team	Pld	W	D	L	GF	GA	GD	Pts	
1	Sandvikens AIK	26	19	3	4	166	78	+88	41	Advance to Knock-out stage
2	Edsbyns IF	26	20	1	5	145	72	+73	41	Advance to Knock-out stage
3	Hammarby IF	26	18	3	5	168	93	+75	39	Advance to Knock-out stage
4	Västerås SK	26	17	5	4	149	83	+66	39	Advance to Knock-out stage
5	Villa Lidköping BK	26	17	4	5	140	69	+71	38	Advance to Knock-out stage
6	Vetlanda BK	26	14	3	9	151	118	+33	31	Advance to Knock-out stage
7	Bollnäs GIF	26	10	6	10	92	98	−6	26	Advance to Knock-out stage
8	IFK Vänersborg	26	11	2	13	104	96	+8	24	Advance to Knock-out stage
9	Broberg/Söderhamn IF	26	7	9	10	104	122	−18	23	
10	IK Tellus	26	4	8	14	84	135	−51	16	
11	IK Sirius	26	5	6	15	73	131	−58	16	
12	IFK Motala	26	5	4	17	84	143	−59	14	Qualification to Relegation playoffs
13	Kalix Bandy	26	3	5	18	58	143	−85	11	Qualification to Relegation playoffs
14	TB Västerås	26	1	3	22	69	206	−137	5	Relegation to the Allsvenskan

Updated to match(es) played on 13 February 2018. Source: svenskbandy.se

== See also ==
- 2017–18 Elitserien (bandy)
- Swedish bandy league system
