= 2016 Bandy World Cup =

The 2016 Bandy World Cup was the 44th annual Bandy World Cup and took place in Göransson Arena in Sandviken, Sweden, on 13-16 October 2016.

== Teams ==
The teams invited to this year's cup were Sandvikens AIK, Bollnäs, Broberg, Edsbyn, Hammarby, Villa Lidköping, Vetlanda, IFK Vänersborg, and Västerås SK from Sweden, Baykal-Energiya, Yenisey, Dynamo Moscow, and SKA-Neftyanik from Russia, Akilles and Botnia-69 from Finland and Stabæk from Norway. After initial group stage games, the tournament ends with a knock-out stage.

== Matches ==
=== Knock-out stage ===
==== Semi finals ====
Game 17
Sun. 6 October 2016
10:00

| Västerås | 6–3 (3–2) | Sandviken |
|---|---|---|
| | match report |

Göransson Arena, Sandviken
Attendance: 1,050
Referee: Daniel Labe/Alexander Korobkov
Game 18
Sun. 6 October 2016
11:30

| Villa | 6–3 (2–0) | Neftyanik |
|---|---|---|
| | match report |

Göransson Arena, Sandviken
Attendance: 750
Referee: Jonas Kandell/Pontus Petersson

==== Final ====
Game 19
Sun. 6 October 2016
16:00

| Västerås | 4–1 (2–1) | Villa |
|---|---|---|
| Tobias Holmberg 04', 43'; Max Mårtensson 19'; Simon Jansson 62' | match report | 05' David Karlsson |

Göransson Arena, Sandviken
Attendance: 860
Referee: Nikita Yuklyavskikh/Petri Kuusela
