= Linus Rönnqvist =

Swedish bandy player (born 1988)

Linus Rönnqvist (born October 6, 1988) is a Swedish bandy player who currently plays for Villa Lidköping BK. Linus signed for Hammarby from Sandvikens AIK, where he played for the under 19 side in the 2005/06 season, and then for Villa Lidköping BK in December 2008.

The professional clubs that he has played for so far are Hammarby IF Bandy (2006-2008), Villa Lidköping (2008-2015), and Gripen Trollhättan BK (2015-).
