= FIB Champions Cup =

- Status: active
- Genre: sporting event
- Date: September
- Frequency: annual
- Country: Sweden
- Inaugurated: 2004

FIB Champions Cup (or Edsbyn Champions Cup) is an international (pre-season) bandy tournament held annually in September on indoor Dina-Arena in Edsbyn, Sweden from 2004 when 8 strongest clubs from Sweden (6 from Elitserien) and Russia (2) competed for the cup for the first time. Next year the format was changed expanding the number of participants to 12 (eight Swedish and four Russian). Russian champions Vodnik (in 2005) and Dynamo Moscow (2005, 2007, 2009) did not participate in the tournament – vacancies were filled by other Swedish clubs, and, once by Tornio (ToPV) (2005) from Finland.

== Editions ==
Season	Winners	Runners-up
2004	(Russia) Vodnik	(Sweden) Edsbyn
2005	(Sweden) Sandviken	(Russia) SKA Neftyanik
2006	(Russia) Dynamo Moscow	(Russia) Zorky
2007	(Sweden) Edsbyn	(Russia) Zorky
2008	(Russia) Dynamo Moscow	(Sweden) Edsbyn
2009	(Russia) Dynamo Kazan	(Russia) Zorky
2010	(Russia) Zorky	(Russia) Dynamo Moscow
2011	(Russia) Zorky	(Sweden) Bollnäs
2012	(Russia) Zorky	(Sweden) Edsbyn
2013	(Russia) Dynamo Moscow	(Sweden) Edsbyn
2014	(Sweden) Bollnäs GIF	(Russia) Dynamo Moscow
2015	(Russia) Dynamo Moscow	(Russia) Zorky
