= Elitserien (bandy) =

Swedish men's bandy top division

- Current season, competition or edition: 2025–26 Elitserien (bandy)
- Sport: Bandy
- Founded: 2007; 19 years ago
- Administrator: Svenska Bandyförbundet
- No. of teams: 14
- Country: Sweden
- Most recent champions: Villa Lidköping BK (4th title) (2024–25)
- Most titles: Västerås SK (21 since 1907)
- Broadcasters: Bandyplay; Bandypuls
- Level on pyramid: Level 1
- Relegation to: Allsvenskan (bandy)
- Domestic cup: Svenska Cupen
- International cup: Bandy World Cup
- Website: Elitserien.se

The Elitserien (literally, the "Elite League") (Swedish: Elitserien i bandy) is since the 2007–08 season the highest bandy league in Sweden. It consists of 14 teams. The season ends with one final game in March. The final was held at Studenternas IP in Uppsala from 1991 until 2012. In 2013 and 2014 the final was played at Friends Arena in Solna, and from 2015 to 2017 it was played at the Tele2 Arena. The final returned to 4,600-capacity Studenternas IP indoor stadium in 2018.

== Season structure ==
During the regular season the fourteen teams play each other team at home and away - a total of 26 games per team.

The top six teams directly qualify for the playoffs for the league championship, while the teams ranked from 7th to 10th enter an additional play-off to decide which teams take the other two championship play-off places. The bottom four teams playoff against the top two teams from the Allsvenskan to decide promotion and relegation.

== Teams ==
=== Current teams (2024–25 season) ===
Locations of the 2024–25 Elitserien teams

Club	Home town	Home ice
Bollnäs GIF	Bollnäs	Sävstaås IP
Broberg/Söderhamn	Söderhamn	Helsingehus Arena*
Edsbyns IF	Edsbyn	Svenska Fönster Arena*
Frillesås BK	Frillesås	Sjöaremossen
Gripen/Trollhättan	Trollhättan	Slättbergshallen*
Hammarby IF	Stockholm	Zinkensdamms IP
Ljusdals BK	Ljusdal	Ljusdals IP
Sandvikens AIK	Sandviken	Göransson Arena*
IK Sirius	Uppsala	Studenternas IP
IFK Vänersborg	Vänersborg	Arena Vänersborg*
Vetlanda BK	Vetlanda	Hydro Arena*
Villa Lidköping BK	Lidköping	Sparbanken Lidköping Arena*
Västerås SK	Västerås	ABB Arena Syd*
Åby/Tjureda IF	Åby	Eriksson Arena*

* – indoor arena

=== Teams through the years ===
The number denotes the place in that year's end stand of the regular league before the championship play-off, while a blank space means the club was not playing in Elitserien that year.
A gold background means the club became Swedish champion that year following the championship play-off, a silver background means the club was the runner-up for the championship.

Team	Home town	2007–08	2008–09	2009–10	2010–11	2011–12	2012–13	2013–14	2014–15	2015–16	2016–17	2017–18	2018–19	2019–20	2020–21	2021–22	2022–23	2023–24	2024–25
AIK	Solna													7	2	2	wd (Note: AIK decided to withdraw from the series due to financial problems.)		
Bollnäs GIF	Bollnäs	9	9	3	2	3	5	10	5	3	3	7	5	5	12	13	3	3	7
IF Boltic (BS BolticGöta) (Note: BS BolticGöta was created by a merger of the two clubs IF Boltic and IF Göta. After the 2007/08 season the name IF Boltic is used again for the new club.)	Karlstad				14														
Broberg/Söderhamn	Söderhamn	8	7	8	6	8	6	7	8	9	7	9	10	6	8	5	6	10	9
Edsbyns IF	Edsbyn	2	1	5	3	5	4	5	3	7	2	2	4	1	4	3	5	6	2
Falu BS	Falun	14		13									12						
Frillesås BK	Frillesås												13	13	13	12	13	9	13
GAIS	Gothenburg					9	9	11	wd (Note: GAIS had qualified for play in Elitserien for the 2014–15 season but choose to withdraw.)										
Gripen Trollhättan BK	Trollhättan	11	12							14	12						12	8	8
Hammarby IF	Stockholm	4	6	1	5	7	1	1	4	6	8	3	6	10	11	11	9	11	6
HaparandaTornio Bandy	Haparanda			9	13														
Kalix BF	Kalix					13		12	10	11	14	13							
Katrineholm Värmbol BS	Katrineholm			14															
IFK Kungälv	Kungälv		11	12	10	6	10	9	11	10									
Ljusdals BK	Ljusdal						13	14	13										14
IFK Motala	Motala	7	13				14					12	9	8	10	8	7	13	
Örebro SK	Örebro		14													16			
IFK Rättvik	Rättvik															14		14	
Sandvikens AIK	Sandviken	1	4	2	1	1	3	2	1	4	4	1	3	3	3	6	4	7	10
IK Sirius	Uppsala	12	3	7	7	11	11	13	12	13	10	11	11	12	9	7	10	4	4
IK Tellus	Stockholm										13	10	14		14	15			
Tillberga IK	Västerås	13			11	14			14 (Note: Tillberga IK replaced GAIS, since GAIS choose to withdraw.)	12	11	14							
Vetlanda BK	Vetlanda	6	5	10	9	12	12	8	9	5	9	6	8	9	7	10	8	5	3
Villa Lidköping BK	Lidköping	5	10	4	4	2	2	3	6	2	1	5	1	2	1	1	1	1	1
IFK Vänersborg	Vänersborg	10	8	11	12	10	7	6	7	8	6	6	7	11	6	9	11	12	11
Västerås SK	Västerås	3	2	6	8	4	8	4	2	1	5	4	2	4	5	4	2	2	5
Åby/Tjureda IF	Åby													14					12

== Previous winners ==
Elitserien is followed by a play-off to decide the national bandy champions. The final for the Swedish championship has been played annually since 1907. Before the start of Elitserien in 2007/2008, the play-off has been preceded by other league structures, most recently by the double structure of Allsvenskan and Elitserien.

Since the start of the present structure of Elitserien, Sandvikens AIK has ended in top of the league 4 times in the end just before the play-off, which is more than any other team. This league win is however not seen as nearly as prestigious as the championship final.

== Top goalscorers ==
Patrik Nilsson has the top scorer record with 94 goals.

Season	Player	Team	Goals
2007–08	(Sweden) Patrik Nilsson	Sandvikens AIK	94
2008–09	(Sweden) Christoffer Edlund	Vetlanda BK	44
2008–09	(Sweden) Magnus Muhrén	Sandvikens AIK	44
2009–10	(Sweden) Christoffer Edlund	Sandvikens AIK	91
2010–11	(Sweden) Christoffer Edlund	Sandvikens AIK	77
2011–12	(Sweden) David Karlsson	Villa Lidköping BK	55
2012–13	(Sweden) David Karlsson	Villa Lidköping BK	65
2013–14	(Sweden) Christoffer Edlund	Sandvikens AIK	73
2014–15	(Sweden) Patrik Nilsson	Sandvikens AIK	61
2015–16	(Sweden) Christoffer Edlund	Sandvikens AIK	59
2016–17	(Sweden) Christoffer Edlund	Sandvikens AIK	70
2017–18	(Sweden) Christoffer Edlund	Sandvikens AIK	76
2018–19	(Sweden) Christoffer Edlund	Sandvikens AIK	61
2019–20	(Sweden) Oscar Wikblad	Edsbyns IF	49
2020–21	(Sweden) Christoffer Edlund	Villa Lidköping BK	72
2021–22	(Sweden) Christoffer Edlund	Villa Lidköping BK	79
2022–23	(Sweden) Christoffer Edlund	Villa Lidköping BK	60
2023–24	(Sweden) Christoffer Edlund	Villa Lidköping BK	53
2024–25	(Sweden) Christoffer Edlund	Villa Lidköping BK	

== See also ==
- List of Swedish bandy champions
