= Portero =

Portero may refer to:

- Concierge in Spanish
- Goalkeeper in Spanish
