= IK Tellus Bandy =

Swedish bandy club

IK Tellus
- City: Stockholm, Sweden
- League: Allsvenskan
- Founded: 11 April 1921; 104 years ago
- Home arena: Zinkensdamms IP
- Head coach: Roland Nyström
- Website: tellusbandy.se
Home colours	Away colours

IK Tellus Bandy is the bandy department of IK Tellus.

In bandy, the club had been playing in Elitserien, the first tier in the Swedish bandy league system. since the 2021/22 season, having been promoted from Allsvenskan.

When IFK Kungälv was kicked out of top-tier Elitserien from the 2016–17 season for not fulfilling the requirements for elite licence, IK Tellus was given their Elitserien spot. Tellus was second last of the teams in Elitserien and had to play for re-qualification, and managed to qualify for the 2017–18 Elitserien too.
