= Swedish Bandy Hall of Fame =

Swedish Bandy Hall of Fame was created in 2012 by the Swedish Bandy Association. A number of former bandy players and leaders are inducted every year.
