= Hammarby IF Bandy =

Hammarby IF
- City: Stockholm, Sweden
- League: Elitserien
- Founded: 1897; 128 years ago
- Home arena: Zinkensdamms IP
- Head coach: Jonas Claesson
- Website: hammarbybandy.se
Home colours	Away colours

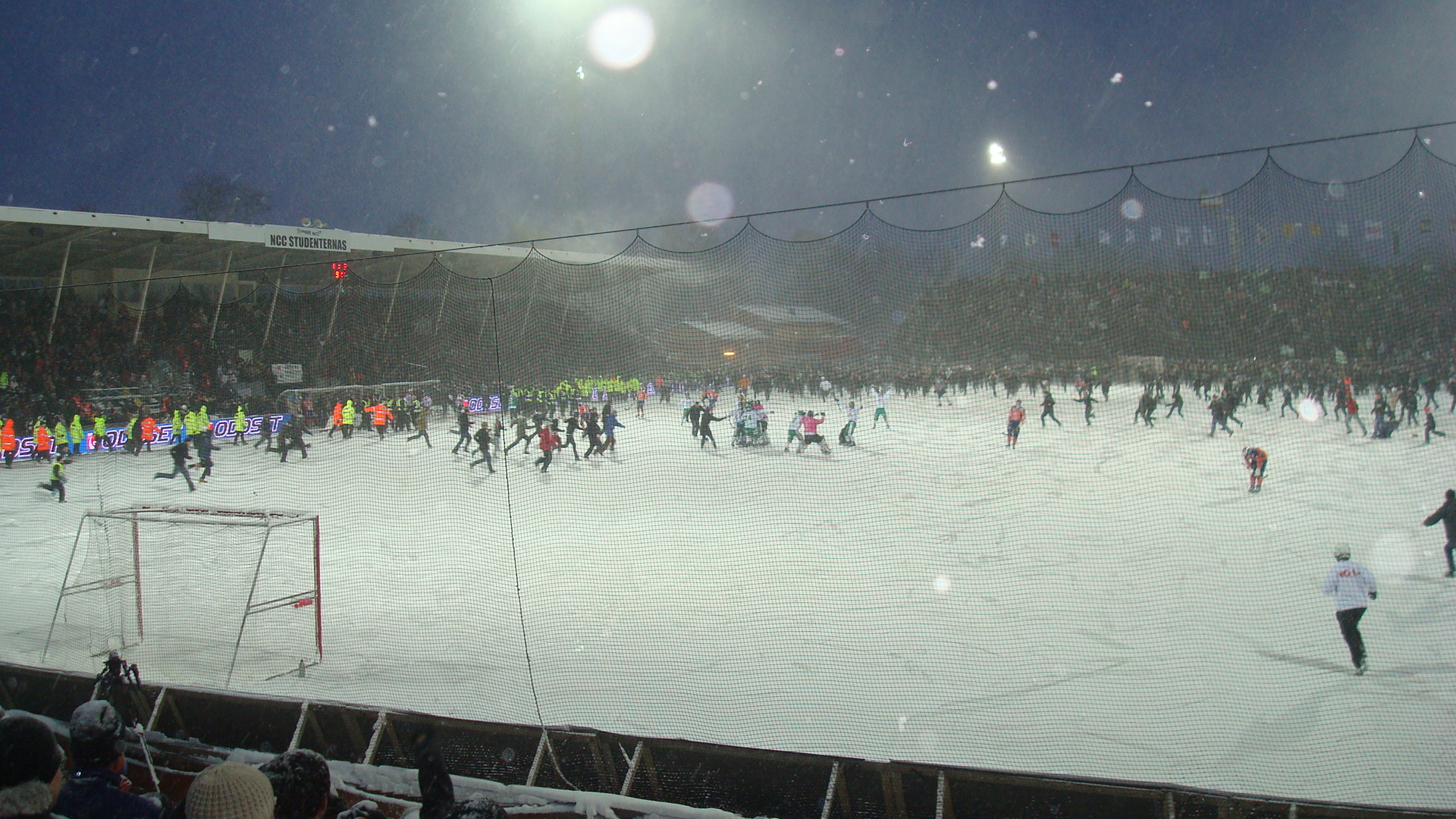
First national title

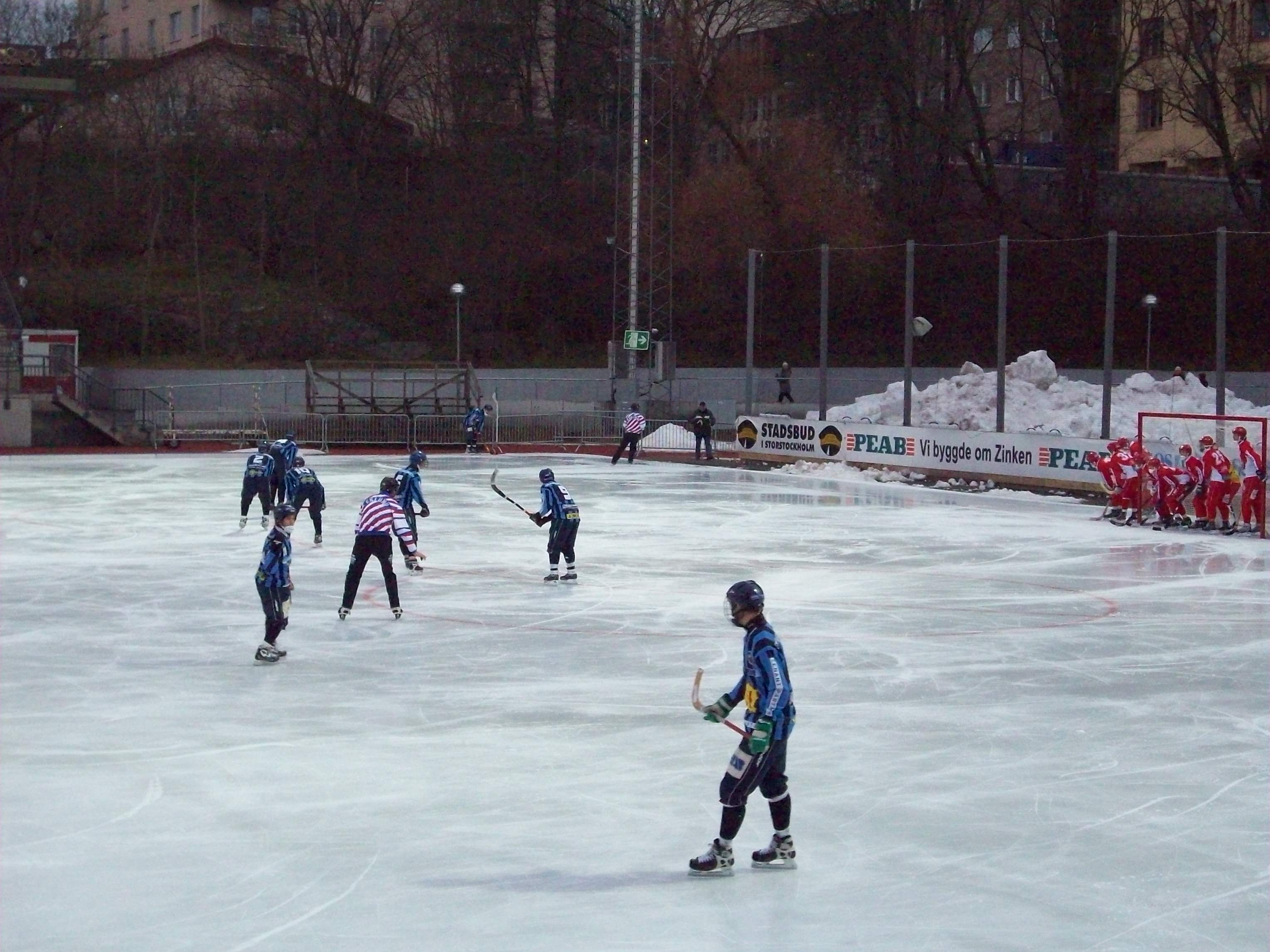
Zinkensdamms IP

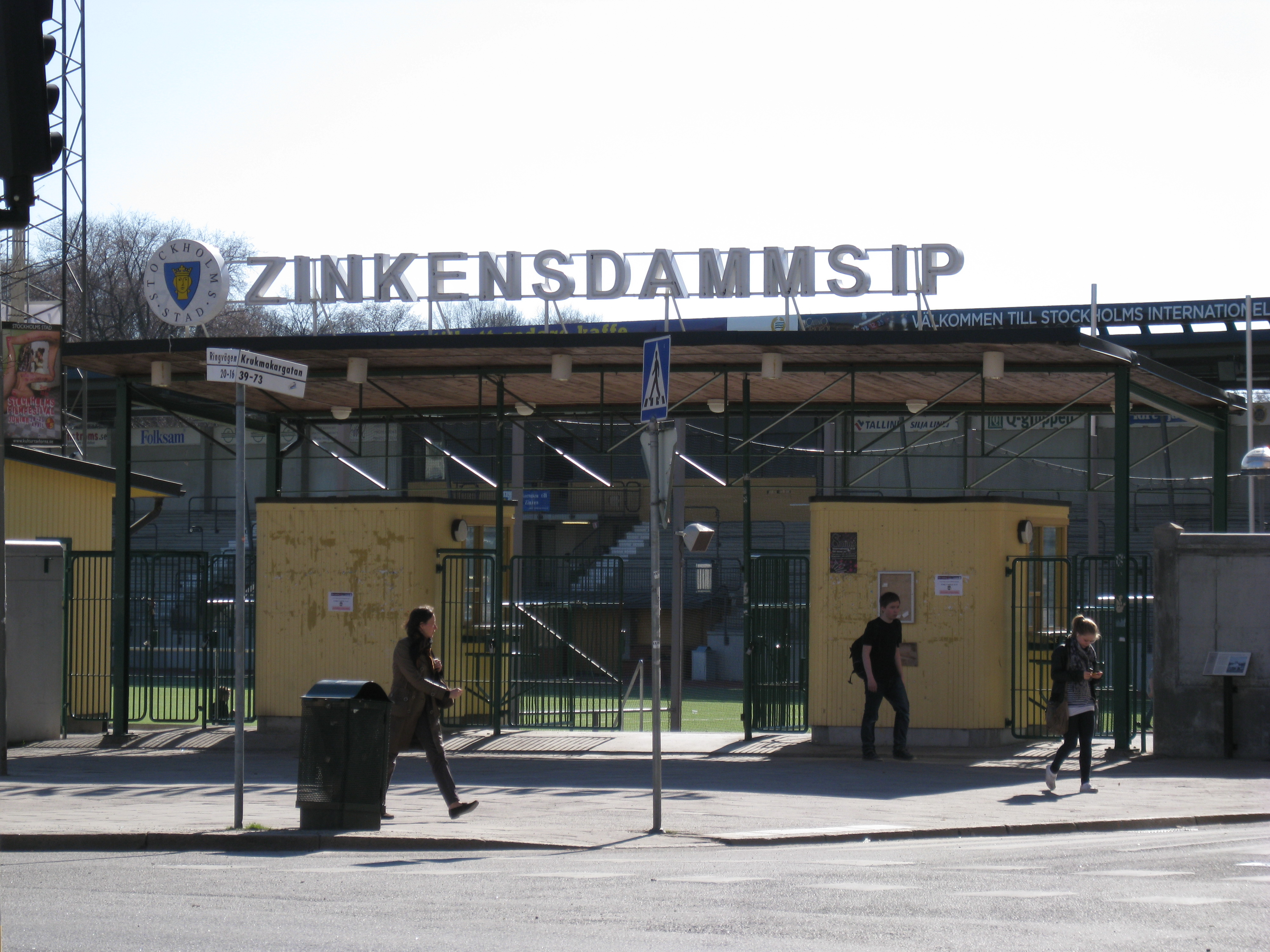

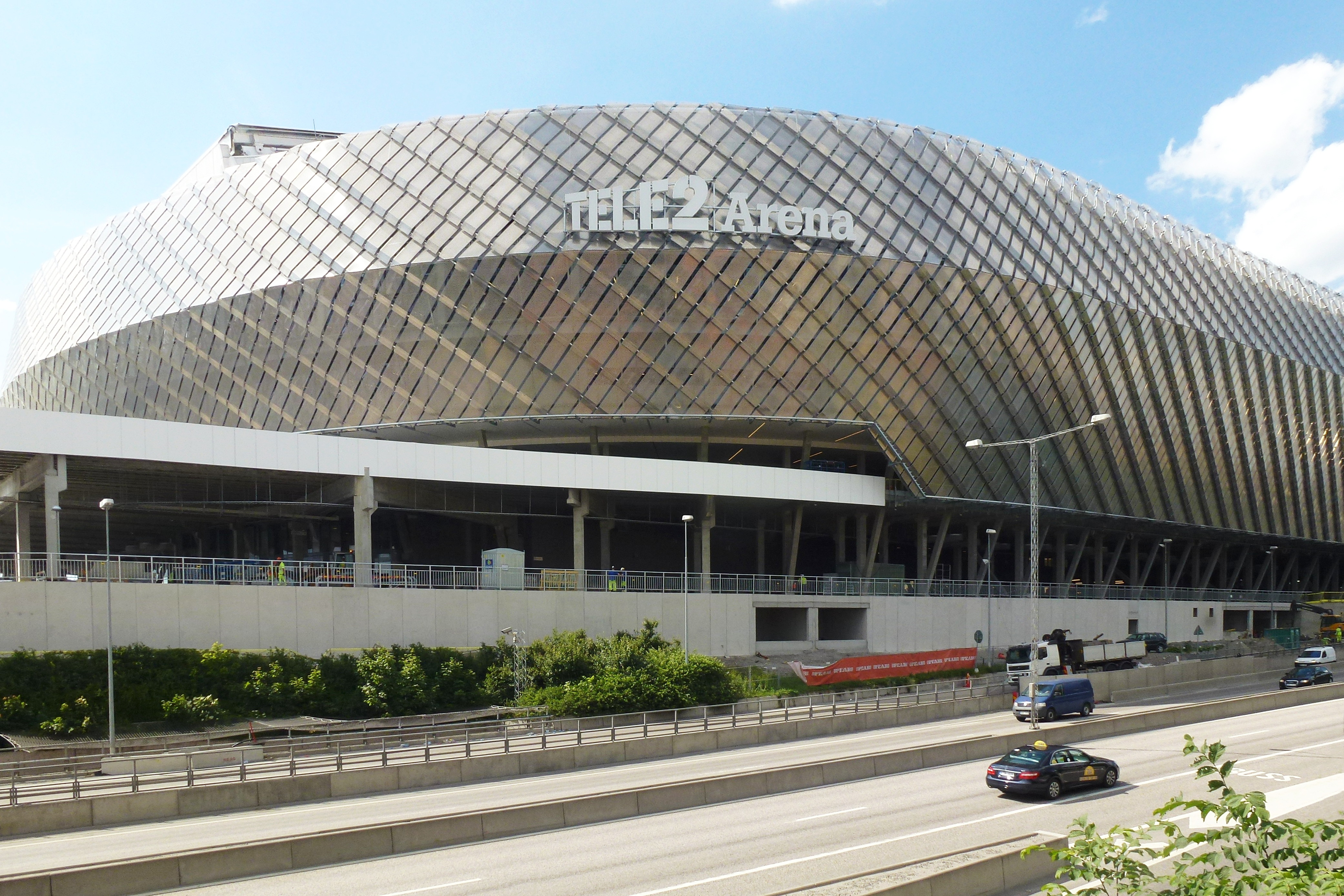
Tele2 Arena

Hammarby IF Bandyförening is a Swedish bandy club from Södermalm, Stockholm, a section of the sports club Hammarby IF.

Hammarby IF was founded under its present name in 1897 and has been playing bandy since 1905. The club currently play in Elitserien, which is the highest division in Sweden, and has won it twice.

== History ==
Hammarby IF Bandy is one of the oldest bandy clubs in Sweden, founded in 1905 as a department of sports club Hammarby IF. At this time, there were several other Stockholm teams who also played bandy – AIK, IFK Stockholm, Djurgårdens IF, IF Swithiod and Djursholm. The different teams played friendly matches and local tournaments.

In 1906, the Swedish Football Association took over the organization of bandy in Sweden. The Swedish championship premiered in 1907 but Hammarby IF failed to qualify for the play-offs until 1916. One year before, Hammarby had merged with Klara SK that provided a big supplement of talented players to the team. Another merge took place in 1918, when Johanneshovs IF joined Hammarby. At this time, Hammarby often played their home games at Hammarby IP in Södermalm, an area the club considers its heartland.

By the end of the 1920s, Hammarby IF had established themselves among the top bandy clubs in Sweden. In the first year of bandy league system in Sweden, 1930–31, Hammarby entered in Division 1 Norra together with AIK, IF Vesta, IFK Rättvik, IK Sirius, Skutskärs IF, SK Tirfing, and Västerås SK and finished 8th.

Since then, As of 2017, Hammarby has not dropped below either the highest or second highest division in Sweden.

In 1957, Hammarby reached their first Swedish championship final, but lost 1–2 to Örebro SK at Stockholms stadion.

Hammarby got relegated to the second division in 1979 and went on a hard struggle for several decades to come. There were even talks that the club would cease its operations. In 1995 Hammarby, however, won their promotion and returned to the top tier.

During the 2000s, Hammarby has achieved much success in both domestic and international competitions. Hammarby has been crowned World Champions three times: beating Ljusdals BK 7–0 in 1999, Sandvikens AIK 2–1 in 2001 and Zorky Krasnogorsk 6–2 in 2009.

They won the Swedish Cup, a knockout cup competition, for the first time in 2007, beating Sandviken in the final. They also won the cup back-to-back in 2013 and 2014.

Hammarby IF won their first national championship title in 2009–10 after beating Bollnäs GoIF in the final match at Studenternas IP. They also won the gold medal in 2013, beating Sandviken, as the final for the first time was played indoors at Friends Arena, that drew a record crowd of 38,474. The club ended as runners-up in the seasons of 1999–2000, 2000–01, 2002–03, 2003–04, 2005–06 and 2006–07.

The club was before the 2007–08 season in big economic problems and a campaign called "Rädda Hammarby Bandy" (save Hammarby Bandy) was set up. In the autumn of 2007 they became a joint-stock company and sold over 400 shares and they got over 2 million sek. Hammarby have strong links with fellow Stockholm-based club GT-76, with many players moving between the clubs.

Hammarby took part in an event in January 2018, where Prince William, Duke of Cambridge and Catherine, Duchess of Cambridge learned more about bandy during a visit to Stockholm.

== Home ice ==
Hammarby play most of their home games at the outdoor rink Zinkensdamms IP, but some major home games are played at the new Tele2 Arena since 2014, for instance the home games in the Elitserien play-off 2014.

== Players ==
=== Squad ===
As of 12 October 2022

Note: Flags indicate national team as defined under FIB eligibility rules. Players may hold more than one non-FIB nationality.

No.	Pos.	Nation	Player
7	MF	(Sweden) SWE	Kasper Milerud
8	FW	(Sweden) SWE	Melker Broberg
9	FW	(Sweden) SWE	David Jansson
11	DF	(Sweden) SWE	David Pizzoni Elfving (captain)
16	DF	(Sweden) SWE	Felix Nyman
17	MF	(Sweden) SWE	Robin Sundin (vice captain)
19	FW	(Sweden) SWE	Isac Karlsson
20	MF	(Sweden) SWE	David Brodén
23	DF	(Sweden) SWE	Olle Öijer
26	GK	(Sweden) SWE	Matteo Tuveson

No.	Pos.	Nation	Player
28	MF	(Sweden) SWE	Niklas Gifting
30	GK	(Sweden) SWE	Filip Mörkdal
34	DF	(Sweden) SWE	Arvid Kihlström
39	MF	(Russia) RUS	Ivan Lebedev
40	MF	(Sweden) SWE	Adam Gilljam
51	FW	(Sweden) SWE	Pontus Nordenfors
55	DF	(Sweden) SWE	Robert Rimgård
61	GK	(Sweden) SWE	Viktor Birgersson
63	DF	(Sweden) SWE	Tom Nyström
75	MF	(Sweden) SWE	Lucas Dalin

=== Notable players ===
List criteria:

- player has won at least two Swedish championships with Hammarby IF, or
- has been awarded the prize of Swedish Bandy Player of the Year by the Swedish Bandy Association while at the club, or
- has received the honorary award Stora Grabbars Märke from the Swedish Bandy Association playing the majority of their career at the club, or
- is a member of Hammarby IF's official Hall of Fame, or
- is a member of the Swedish Bandy Hall of Fame, starting or playing the majority of their career at the club.

Name	Nationality	Position	Hammarby IF Bandy career	Club titles	Individual honours	Hall of Fame
Sigfrid Öberg	Sweden	Forward	1925–1939		Stora Grabbars Märke	
Åke Andersson	Sweden	Midfielder	1934–1958		Stora Grabbars Märke	Hammarby IF's Hall of Fame
Leif Fredblad	Sweden	Forward	1955–1973		Stora Grabbars Märke	Swedish Bandy Hall of Fame; Hammarby IF's Hall of Fame
Jonas Claesson	Sweden	Forward	1996–2002		Stora Grabbars Märke; Swedish bandy player of the year in 1999 and 2000	Swedish Bandy Hall of Fame; Hammarby IF's Hall of Fame
Göran Rosendahl	Sweden	Defender	1997–2006		Stora Grabbars Märke	Hammarby IF's Hall of Fame
Stefan Jonsson	Sweden	Defender	2001–2008		Stora Grabbars Märke	Swedish Bandy Hall of Fame
Stefan Erixon	Sweden	Midfielder	2002–2007; 2008–2015	2 Swedish Championships	Stora Grabbars Märke	Hammarby IF's Hall of Fame

== Honours ==
=== Domestic ===
- Swedish Champions:
  - Winners (2): 2010, 2013
  - Runners-up (7): 1957, 2000, 2001, 2003, 2004, 2006, 2007

==== Cups ====
- Svenska Cupen:
  - Winners (3): 2007, 2013, 2014
  - Runners-up (3): 2009, 2011, 2012

=== International ===
- World Cup:
  - Winners (3): 1999, 2001, 2009
  - Runners-up (1): 2010
