= Sapa Arena =

Indoor arena in Vetlanda, Sweden

- Interactive map of Sapa Arena
- Location: Vetlanda, Sweden
- Owner: Vetlanda Arena AB
- Capacity: 2,000

Construction
- Opened: 10 September 2011

Tenants
- Vetlanda BK, Skirö AIK

Sapa Arena is an indoor bandy and ice hockey rink in Vetlanda in Sweden. It is the home venue of Vetlanda BK, and was inaugurated on 10 September 2011 with a men's friendly bandy game where Vetlanda BK defeated Hammarby IF, 5–3. Sapa Arena holds 2,000 people. It hosted Division B of the 2013 Bandy World Championship.
