= Kalix IP =

Sports venue in Kalix, Sweden

Coordinates: 65.85382920574087°N 23.17959620993392°E

- Interactive map of Kalix IP
- Location: Kalix, Sweden

Tenant
- Kalix BF

Kalix IP is a sports venue in Kalix, Sweden. It is the home of the bandy club, Kalix BF.

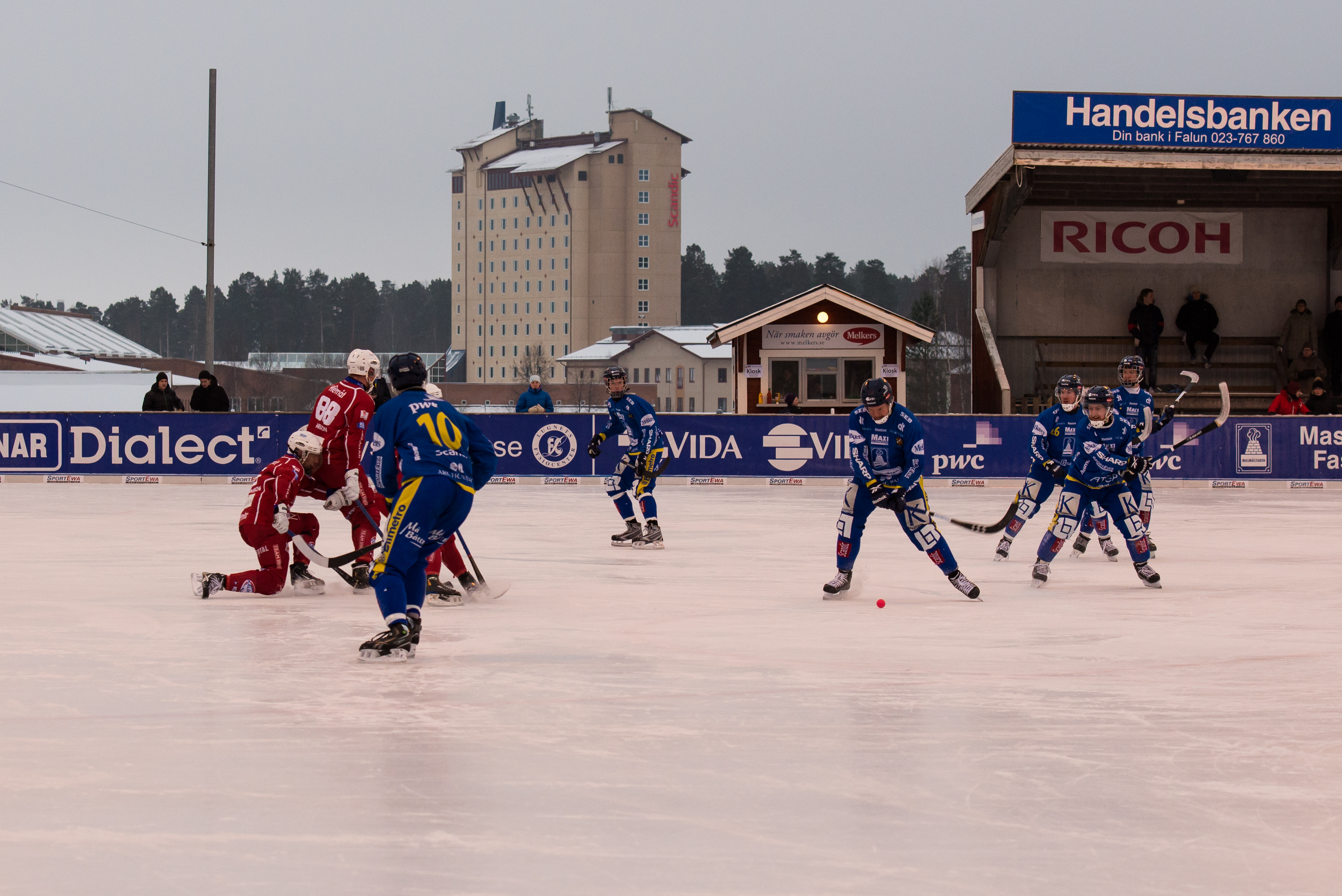
Kalix BF match against Faulu BS in 2013.
