= Sävstaås IP =

Sports ground in Bollnäs, Sweden

Coordinates: 61.3433°N 16.3447°E

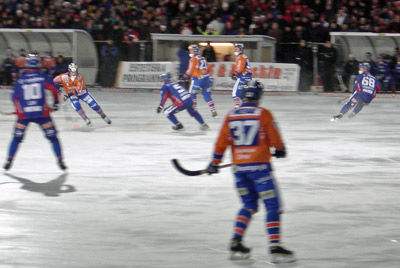
- The game Bollnäs GoIF-Bollnäs GoIF at Sävstaås IP on 26 December 2004 during the 2004-2005 Bandy Allsvenskan.
- Interactive map of Sävstaås IP
- Location: Bollnäs, Sweden

Construction
- Opened: 1973

Tenant
- Bollnäs GIF

Sävstaås IP is a sports ground in Bollnäs, Sweden, used for bandy, soccer and track and field athletics. The bandy rink, which was the home soil for Bollnäs GIF, was inaugurated for the 1973–1974 season and artificial ice was installed in 1984. Before 1973, Bollnäs GIF had played its bandy home games at Långnäs IP.

The record attendance at Sävstaås IP occurred on 26 December 2000, when 8,151 people came to watch Bollnäs GIF playing against Edsbyns IF during a Saint Stephen's Day gme in the Northern Bandy Allsvenskan group. On one side is a major, roofed, stand housing the home team's supporters while on the other side is a stand without roof, usually housing the away team's supporters.

The 2022–2023 season saw Bollnäs GIF's bandy team moving into SBB Arena.
