= Villa Lidköping BK =

- City: Lidköping, Sweden
- League: Elitserien
- Founded: 18 January 1934; 92 years ago
- Home arena: Sparbanken Lidköping Arena
- Head coach: Johan Sixtensson
- Website: vlbk.se
Home colours	Away colours

Villa Lidköping BK is a bandy club in Lidköping i Sweden. The club was formed on 18 January 1934 as Villa BK on Lockörn outside Lidköping, where the old club cottage still is. The club's name comes from the nearby country estate Villa Giacomina.

Villa has played in the Swedish championship finals seven times, losing 4 out of the 7 appearances in the years 1975, 1983, 2012 and 2016 before finally winning in 2019 and again in 2021, followed up by a third victory in 2024 and a fifth in 2025. Home games are played in Sparbanken Lidköping Arena.

In October 2018, the club won its first World Cup title. The women's team won the Swedish national championship for first time during the 2020–2021 season and again during the 2021–2022, 2022–2023 and 2023–2024 seasons.

The men's team won the Swedish Cup in the years 2016, 2020, 2021, 2022, 2023 and 2024. The women's team won the Swedish Cup in the years 2020, 2021, 2022, 2025. and 2026.

== Squad ==
As of 17 March 2015

Note: Flags indicate national team as defined under FIB eligibility rules. Players may hold more than one non-FIB nationality.

No.	Pos.	Nation	Player
2	MF	(Sweden) SWE	Mattias Johansson
5	MF	(Sweden) SWE	Linus Rönnqvist
6	MF	(Sweden) SWE	Martin Karlsson
7	MF	(Sweden) SWE	Lars Fall
8	MF	(Sweden) SWE	Christian Älvegran
9	DF	(Sweden) SWE	Erik Rosengren
10	FW	(Sweden) SWE	David Karlsson
12	FW	(Sweden) SWE	Tim Person
15	GK	(Sweden) SWE	David Borvall
21	FW	(Sweden) SWE	Jesper Bryngelson
22	DF	(Sweden) SWE	Martin Andreasson

No.	Pos.	Nation	Player
24	DF	(Sweden) SWE	Martin Johansson
25	MF	(Sweden) SWE	Tobias Nyberg
28	DF	(Sweden) SWE	Daniel Lehnbom
34	GK	(Sweden) SWE	Jakob Säleby
64	MF	(Sweden) SWE	Johan Karlsson
71	DF	(Sweden) SWE	Johan Malmquist
75	MF	(Sweden) SWE	Jesper Eriksson
79	GK	(Sweden) SWE	Jon Karlsson
83	MF	(Sweden) SWE	Daniel Andersson
92	MF	(Sweden) SWE	Petter Björling

== Honours ==
=== Domestic ===
- Swedish National Champions:
  - Winner (3): 2019, 2021, 2024
  - Runners-up (5): 1975, 1983, 2012, 2016, 2020
- Swedish Cup:
  - Winner (6): 2016, 2020, 2021, 2022, 2023, 2024
  - Runners-up (1): 2008

=== International ===
- World Cup:
  - Winner (1): 2018
  - Runners-up (1): 2016
