= Studenternas IP =

Sports ground in Uppsala, Sweden

Coordinates: 59.84958°N 17.64532°E

- Studan
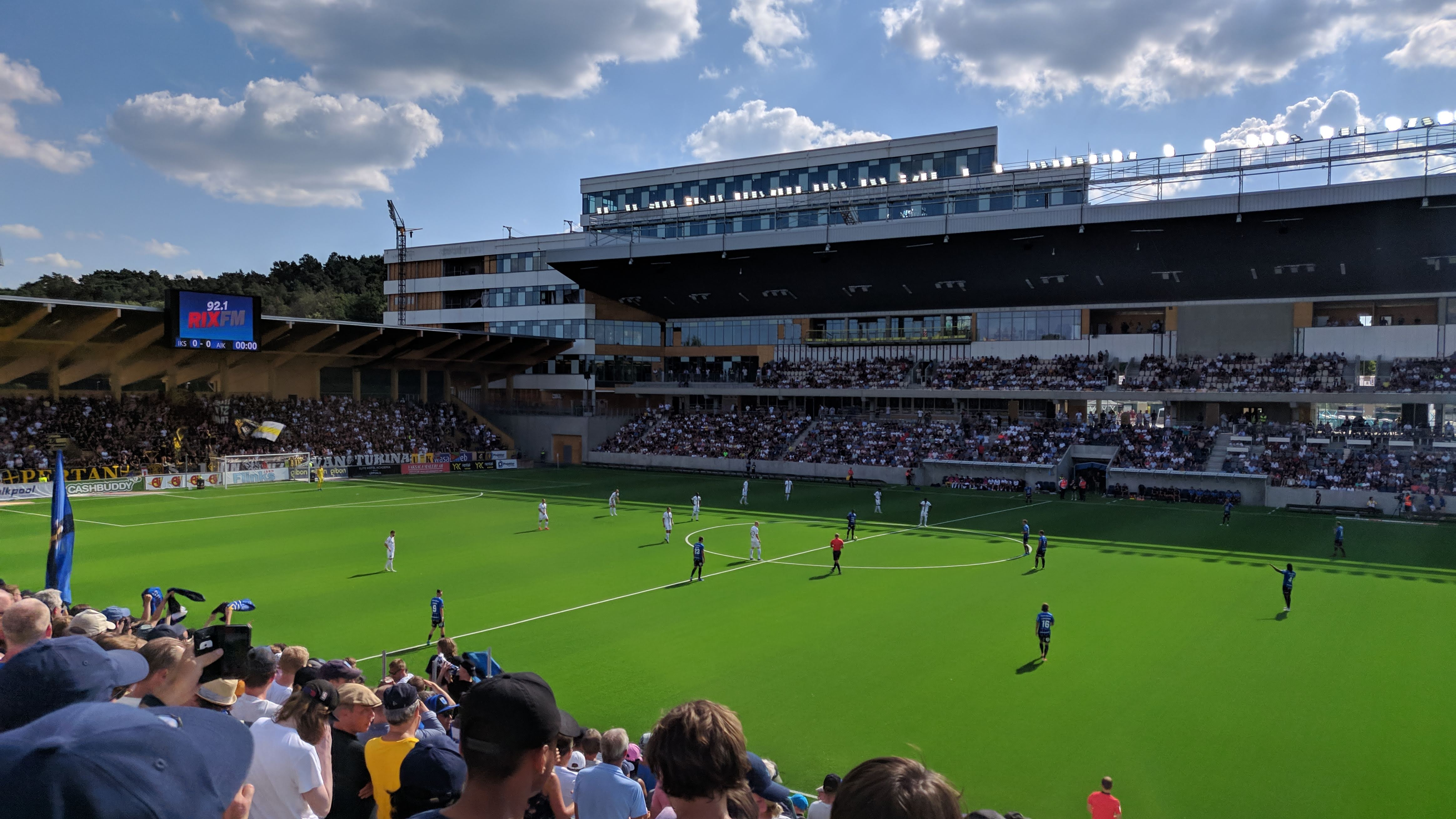
- Photo from July 2019. Football game played during the rebuilding of Studenternas.
- Interactive map of Studenternas IP
- Full name: Studenternas idrottsplats
- Location: Uppsala, Sweden
- Owner: Uppsala Municipality
- Operator: Uppsala Municipality
- Capacity: 10,522
- Surface: Artificial grass (since 2019) and ice.
- Record attendance: 25,560

Construction
- Built: 1908–1909
- Opened: 21 March 1909
- Rebuilt: 2017–2020

Tenants
- IK Sirius; IK Sirius Fotboll

Studenternas IP is a multi-use stadium in Uppsala, Sweden and the home arena for the football club IK Sirius Fotboll on the men's side and IK Uppsala Fotboll on the women's and in bandy for IK Sirius in Elitserien and several other bandy teams. It was inaugurated on 21 March 1909.

The summer arena has a total capacity of 10,522 spectators and the winter arena 4,700. The bandy finals were played here from 1991 until 2012. From 2018 until 2023, the finals were once again played at Studenternas. The arena has a much bigger capacity during that weekend, for example 25,560 spectators saw the 2010 men's final. The summer arena underwent a major upgrade between 2017 and 2020. The "new Studenternas" has a capacity of 10,522 spectators. The record attendance under the new capacity is 10,054, which was set when AIK won the Allsvenskan clash on July 31 2023.

== Image gallery ==
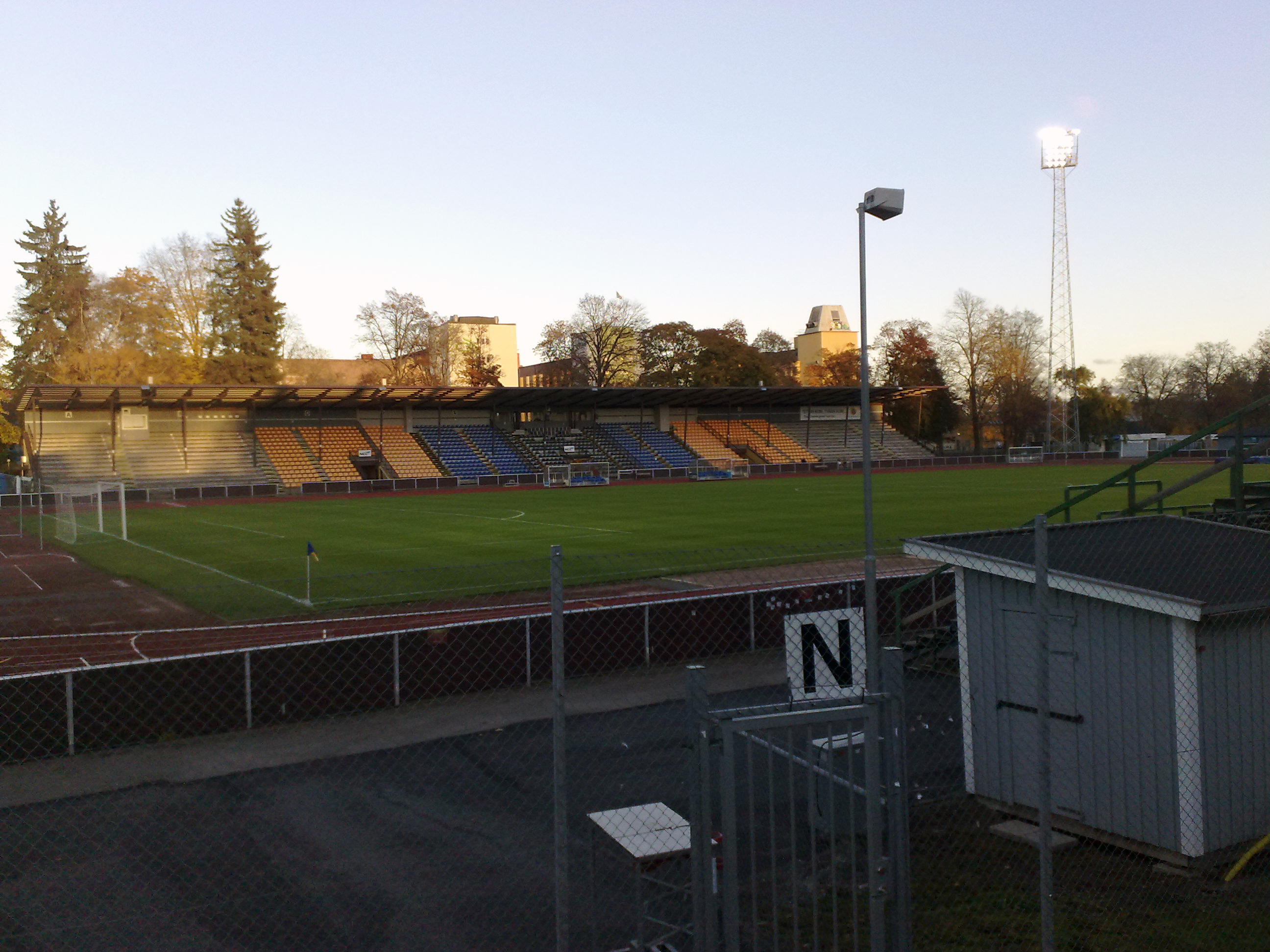
The former main stand of the football section of Studenternas IP. It was demolished in 2018 to make place for the new stadium.

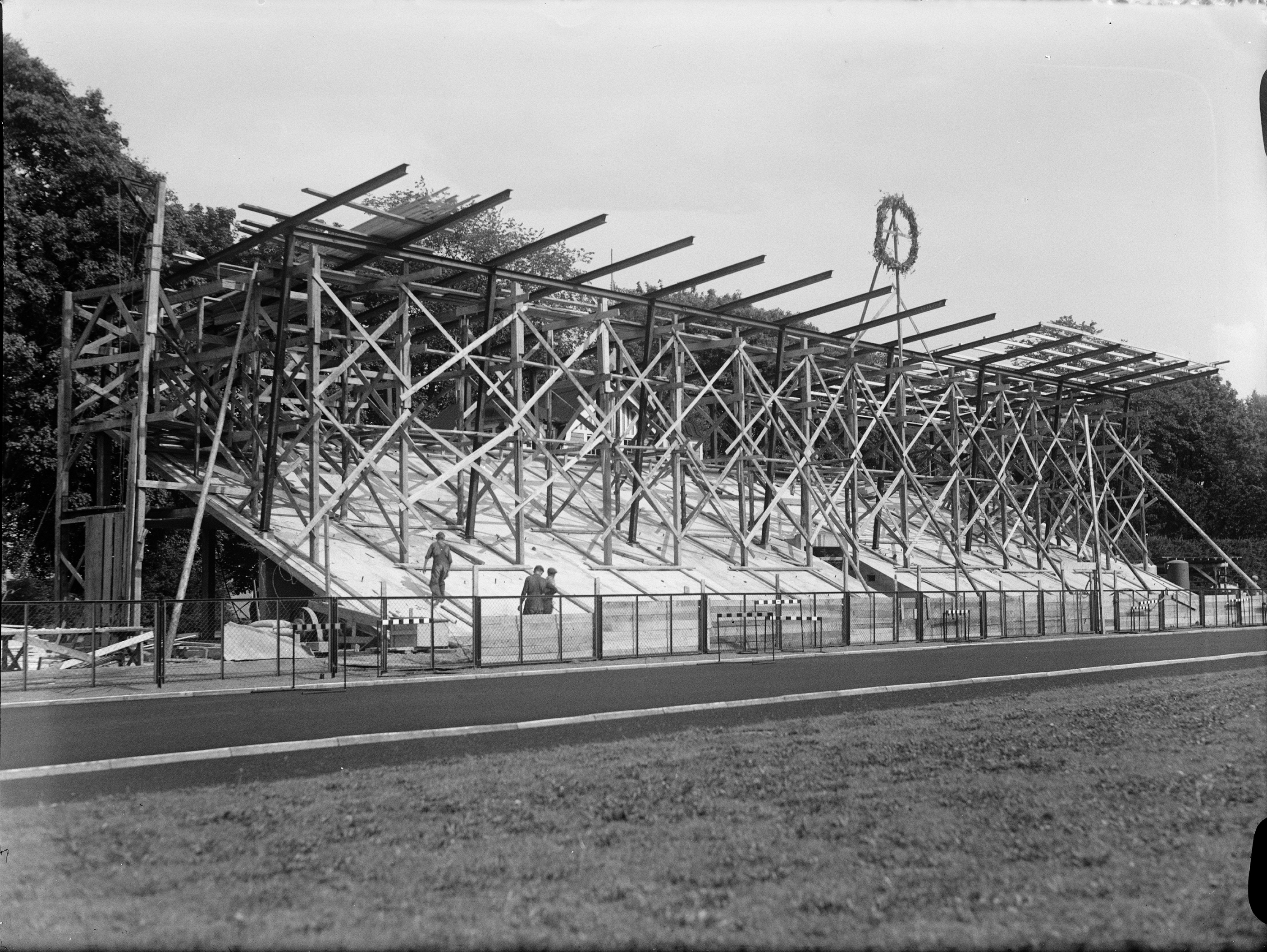
The old main stand of Studenternas IP being built in 1939.

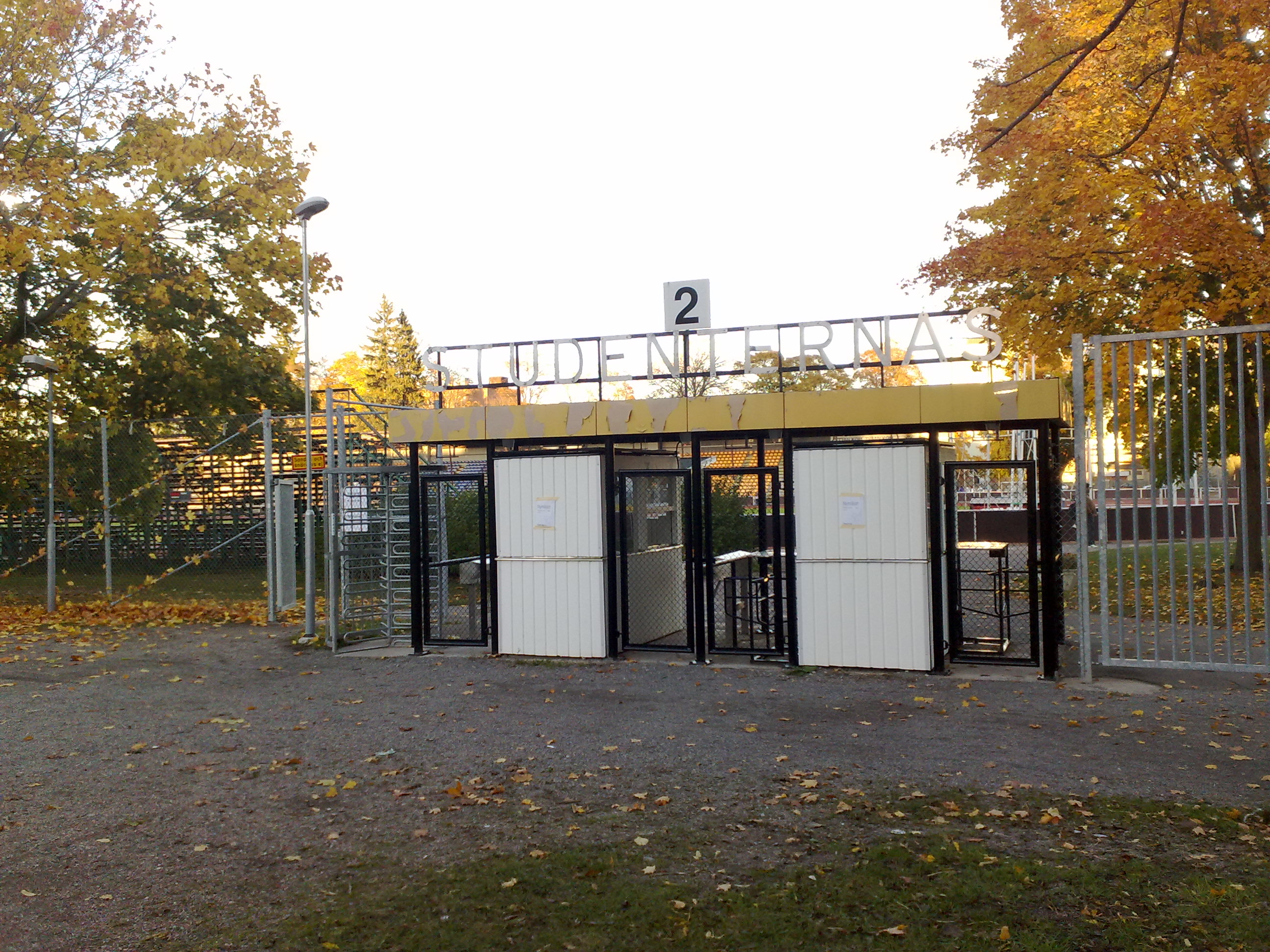
The former entrance to the smaller standing section of Studenternas IP. It was demolished in 2017.

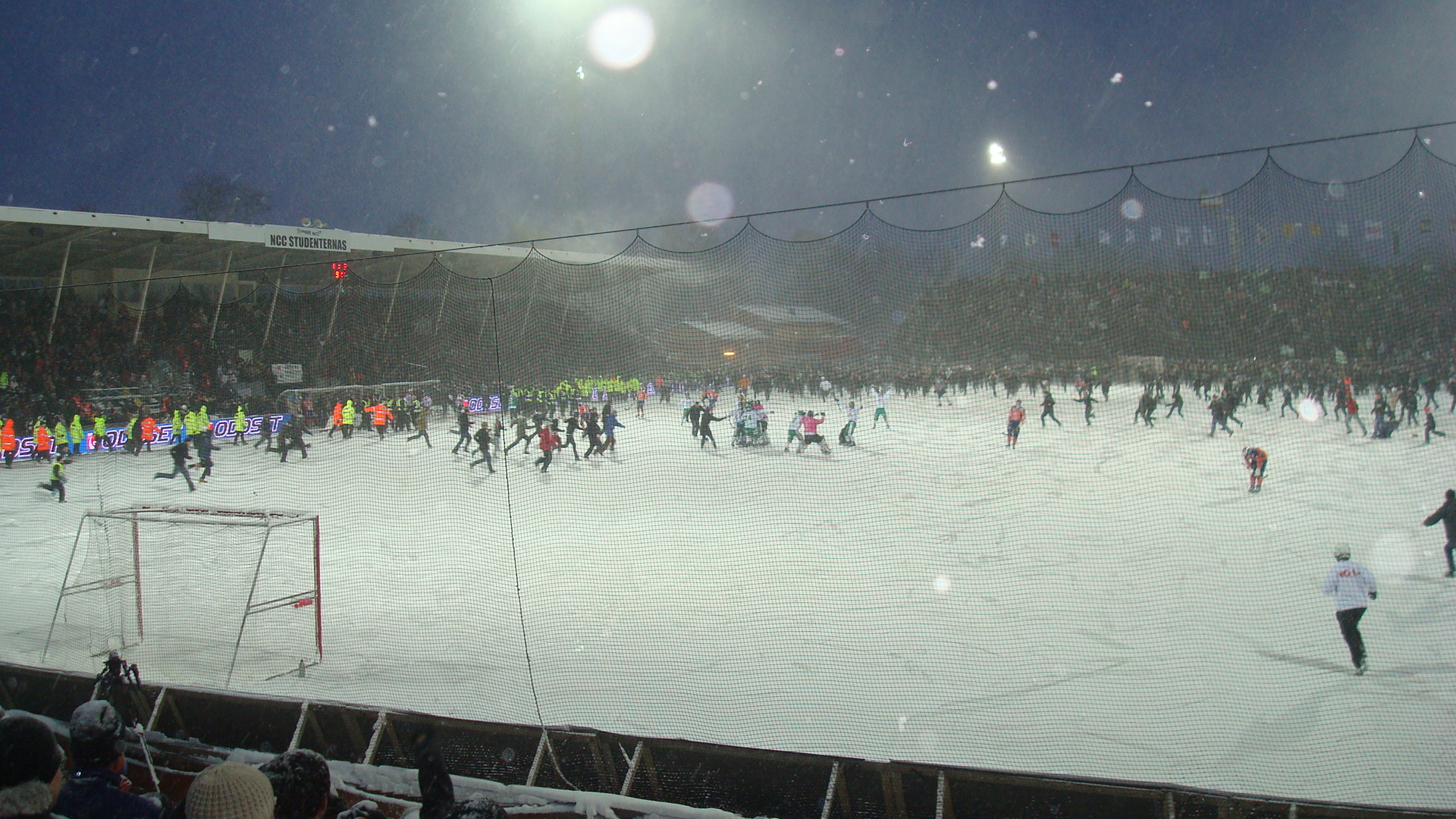
The winter part of the arena after Hammarby IF Bandy won their first national bandy title.
