= Hällåsen =

Sports venue in Söderhamn, Sweden

Coordinates: 61.2886°N 17.0730°E

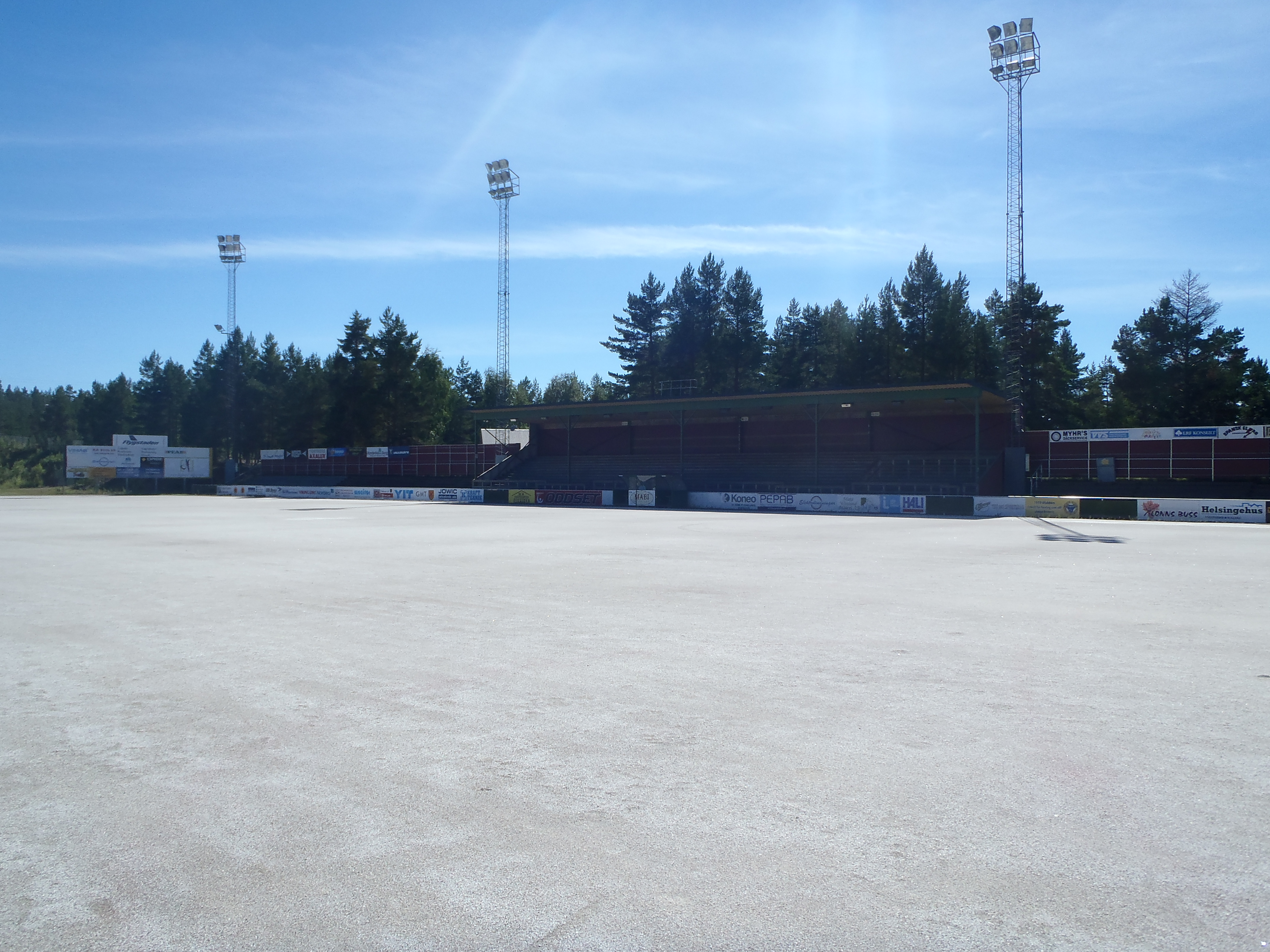
- Interactive map of Hällåsen
- Location: Söderhamn, Sweden

Tenant
- Broberg/Söderhamn Bandy

Hällåsen is a sports venue in Söderhamn, Sweden. It is the home of Broberg/Söderhamn Bandy since 1976.
