= Gripen Trollhättan BK =

- City: Trollhättan, Sweden
- League: Elitserien
- Founded: 1936; 89 years ago
- Home arena: Slättbergshallen
- Website: gripentrollhattan.se
Home colours	Away colours

Gripen Trollhättan BK is a bandy club in Trollhättan, Sweden, formed in 1936. The club was named Gripens BK 1936–1988. The men's team played in the Swedish first division in the seasons 1973–74, 2001–02, 2002–03 and 2004–05. In the 2006–07 season, the club managed to reach the first division again, where the club plays the 2007–08 season. Their home arena is Slättbergshallen, where one match, Sweden–Finland, during the 2013 Bandy World Championship was played.
