= Edsbyns IF =

Bandy team in Edsbyn, Sweden

- City: Edsbyn, Sweden
- League: Elitserien
- Founded: 6 June 1909; 117 years ago
- Home arena: Edsbyn Arena
- Head coach: Magnus Kuben Olsson
- Website: bandybyn.se
Home colours	Away colours

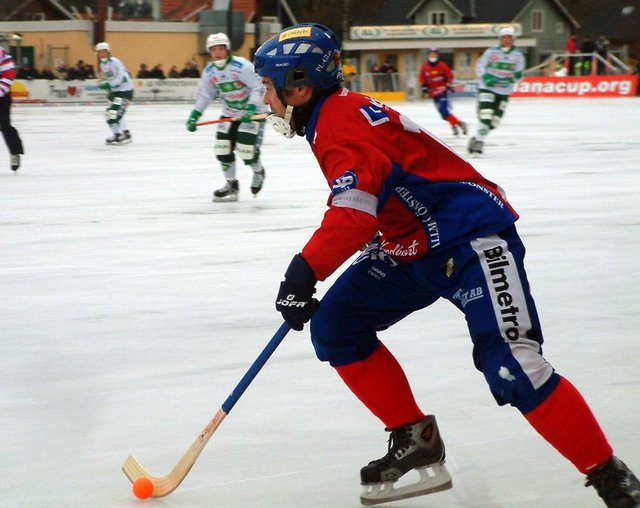
Magnus "Kuben" Olsson of Edsbyn against Västerås SK

Edsbyns IF is a bandy team from Edsbyn in Ovanåker Municipality in Sweden founded on 6 June 1909. The bandy section of the club was founded as late as in 1925 was formally made a club of its own on 28 June 2000.

Edsbyns IF has played in the highest bandy league in Sweden from 1945 to 1969 and then again since 1971.

== History ==
Edsbyns IF was founded in 1909.

In September 2003, Edsbyn moved to Edsbyn Arena, the first indoor arena for bandy in Sweden, and won the Swedish Championship final in the end of the season.

On 26 March 2004, Edsbyns IF played a men's bandy exhibition game at the Streatham Ice Arena in London against Russian Super League team Vodnik, which ended with a 10–10 draw.

The club's bandy section was awarded the Hälsingland Golden Award in 2004. The award has also been given to various individual sportspeople competing for the club.

In June 2009, the club decided to dissolve the women's bandy team for the 2009–2010 season, while keeping the girls' bandy activity and attempting to re-start the women's team as soon as possible. On 4 October 2009, the women's bandy team Team Hälsingland was established instead, as a cooperation between Bollnäs GIF, Broberg/Söderhamn Bandy, Edsbyns IF and Ljusdals BK.

Team Hälsingland shut down in 2017. Three years later, 2020, Edsbyn IF launched a new women's bandy team. Which as of today (3 February 2024) is playing in Norra Allsvenskan, the Swedish second highest league in bandy.

The 2025–2026 season saw Edsbyns IF's men's team winning the Swedish Championship for 14th time, by defratging Villa Lidköping BK, 8–2, in the final game inside the ABB Arena in Västerås on 14 March 2026.

== Players ==
=== Current squad ===
Updated|03 February 2024|

Note: Flags indicate national team as defined under FIB eligibility rules. Players may hold more than one non-FIB nationality.

No.	Pos.	Nation	Player
4	MF	(Sweden) SWE	Per Hellmyrs
5	DF	(Sweden) SWE	David Eliasson
6	FW	(Sweden) SWE	Oscar Wikblad
9	MF	(Finland) FIN	Teemu Määttä
10	FW	(Sweden) SWE	Albin Bysell
11	MF	(Finland) FIN	Samuli Helavouri
12	DF	(Sweden) SWE	Joakim Svensk
13	MF	(Sweden) SWE	Mattias Larsson
14	MF	(Sweden) SWE	Martin Frid

No.	Pos.	Nation	Player
20	FW	(Sweden) SWE	Marius Åström
21	FW	(Sweden) SWE	Noa Djäkner
40	MF	(Sweden) SWE	Edvin Altberg
44	DF	(Sweden) SWE	Jesper Granqvist
55	MF	(Norway) NOR	Tyler Myrmo
50	GK	(Sweden) SWE	Henrik Karlström
71	MF	(Russia) RUS	Vadim Arkhipkin
90	MF	(Sweden) SWE	Ted Hedell
97	GK	(Sweden) SWE	Oscar Löfström

== Honours ==
=== Domestic ===
- Swedish Champions:
  - Winners (14): 1952, 1953, 1962, 1978, 2004, 2005, 2006, 2007, 2008, 2017, 2018, 2020, 2022, 2026
  - Runners-up (9): 1949, 1955, 1958, 1961, 1963, 1982, 1984, 2009, 2025

==== Cup ====
- Svenska Cupen:
  - Winners (4): 2005, 2008, 2019, 2026

=== International ===
- World Cup:
  - Winners (3): 1979, 1991, 2008
  - Runners-up (3): 1980, 2005, 2007
- European Cup:
  - Winners (2): 2005, 2007
  - Runners-up (4): 1978, 2004, 2006, 2008

== See also ==
- Category:Edsbyns IF players
