= Sandvikens AIK =

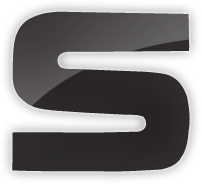
- City: Sandviken, Sweden
- League: Elitserien
- Founded: 16 March 1901; 124 years ago
- Home arena: Göransson Arena
- Head coach: Joakim Forslund
- Website: saik.com
Home colours	Away colours

Sandvikens AIK (commonly known as SAIK) a sports club in Sandviken, Sweden. The bandy section plays its home games in the Göransson Arena in Sandviken. They play in a black outfit.

== History ==
Sandvikens AIK was founded on 16 March 1901. Originally named IK Stjärnan, they were the home for the white-collar workers, while IK Kronan (later Sandvikens IF) was the home for blue-collar workers.

Sandvikens AIK began playing bandy in 1922 won the Swedish Bandy Championship for first time 1945.

== Squad ==
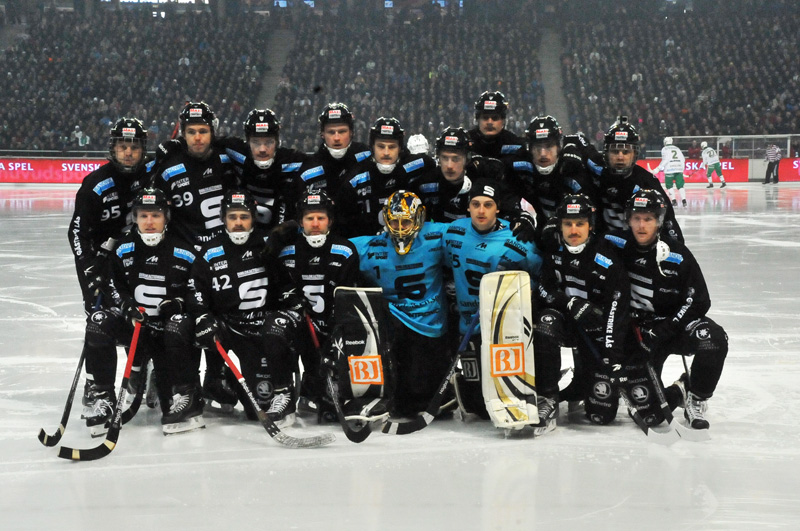
Sandvikens AIK squad at the 2013 Swedish Championship Final.

As of 22 January 2018

Note: Flags indicate national team as defined under FIB eligibility rules. Players may hold more than one non-FIB nationality.

No.	Pos.	Nation	Player
1	GK	(Sweden) SWE	Joel Othén
2	DF	(Sweden) SWE	Joakim Bergman
5	FW	(Sweden) SWE	Oscar Stadin
6	MF	(Sweden) SWE	Daniel Berlin
7	DF	(Sweden) SWE	Victor Berling
8	MF	(Sweden) SWE	Albin Bjerkegren
9	MF	(Sweden) SWE	Hannes Edlund
11	DF	(Sweden) SWE	Jesper Jansson

No.	Pos.	Nation	Player
18	DF	(Sweden) SWE	Albin Airisniemi
20	MF	(Sweden) SWE	David Brodén
22	MF	(Sweden) SWE	Dennis Henriksen
29	FW	(Sweden) SWE	Lucas Widman
31	DF	(Sweden) SWE	Rasmus Forslund
30	GK	(Sweden) SWE	Jesper Sundving
39	FW	(Sweden) SWE	Linus Forslund
89	FW	(Finland) FIN	Niklas Holopainen

== Honours ==
=== Domestic ===
- Swedish National Champions:
  - Winners (9): 1945, 1946, 1997, 2000, 2002, 2003, 2011, 2012, 2014
  - Runners-up (14): 1940, 1941, 1950, 1971, 1977, 1980, 1990, 1996, 1998, 2005, 2008, 2013, 2015, 2017

==== Cup ====
- Swedish Cup Champions:
  - Winners (6): 2006, 2009, 2010, 2011, 2012, 2018

=== International ===
- World Cup:
  - Winners (3): 1974, 2002, 2017
  - Runners-up (11): 1975, 1989, 1991, 1992, 1994, 2001, 2003, 2004, 2011, 2015, 2018
- Champions Cup:
  - Winners (1): 2005
- European Cup:
  - Winners (1): 1997
  - Runners-up (2): 2002, 2003

== Records ==
- Victory: 22–2 vs. Katrineholms SK (22 November 2009)
- Loss: 2–12 vs. Västerås SK (14 February 1988)
- Highest attendance: 5,880 vs. Vetlanda BK (15 March 1988)
- Most goals scored: 700, Magnus Muhrén (1993–2004, 2007–10, 2013–14)
