= Bollnäs GIF =

Bandy club in Bollnäs, Sweden

- City: Bollnäs, Sweden
- League: Elitserien
- Founded: 1895; 131 years ago
- Home arena: SBB Arena
- Head coach: Peter Törnberg
- Website: bollnasbandy.se
| Home colours | Away colours |

Bollnäs GoIF/BF, commonly known as Bollnäs GIF or Giffarna, is a bandy club founded in 1895 from Bollnäs in Sweden who play in SBB Arena. The club won the World Cup in 2005 and 2019.

The men's bandy team also won the Swedish Cup in 2005, 2008 and 2025.

== History ==
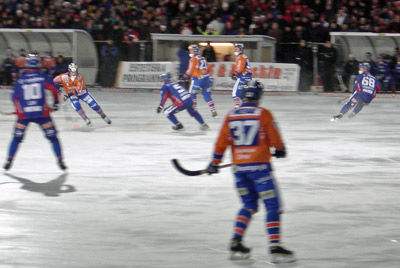
Bollnäs against local rivals Edsbyns IF

Bollnäs GIF was founded in 1895.

Bollnäs GIF have played seven Swedish Championship finals and won two of them, in 1951 and 1956, both against Örebro SK.

== Squad ==
As of 22 January 2018

Note: Flags indicate national team as defined under FIB eligibility rules. Players may hold more than one non-FIB nationality.

| No. | Pos. | Nation | Player |
|---|---|---|---|
| 2 | DF | (Sweden) SWE | Jens Wiik |
| 3 | DF | (Finland) FIN | Leevi Laitinen |
| 8 | DF | (Sweden) SWE | Anton Dahlberg |
| 10 | MF | (Sweden) SWE | Linus Westh |
| 15 | DF | (Sweden) SWE | Linus Pettersson |
| 16 | MF | (Sweden) SWE | Joel Wigren |
| 20 | MF | (Sweden) SWE | Philip Åström |
| 21 | MF | (Sweden) SWE | Philip Bergström |
| 24 | DF | (Sweden) SWE | Marcus Persson |
| 30 | GK | (Sweden) SWE | Erik Persson |

| No. | Pos. | Nation | Player |
|---|---|---|---|
| 34 | MF | (Finland) FIN | Riku Hämäläinen |
| 39 | FW | (Russia) RUS | Denis Sadakov |
| 46 | FW | (Sweden) SWE | Rasmus Skarps |
| 48 | DF | (Sweden) SWE | Johan Törnberg |
| 54 | MF | (Sweden) SWE | Kasper Sandgren |
| 75 | MF | (Sweden) SWE | Arvid Rönnlund |
| 89 | MF | (Finland) FIN | Tatu Ässämäki |
| 93 | GK | (Sweden) SWE | Oswald Gustavsson |
| 95 | MF | (Sweden) SWE | Erik Pettersson |

== Honours ==
=== Domestic ===
- Swedish Champions:
  - Winners (2): 1951, 1956
  - Runners-up (4): 1943, 2010, 2011, 2017

==== Cup ====
- Svenska Cupen:
  - Winners (1): 2025

=== International ===
- World Cup:
  - Winners (2): 2005, 2019
  - Runners-up (1): 2008
- Champions Cup:
  - Winners (1): 2014
  - Runners-up (1): 2011
