= Goalkeeper =

Player in sports preventing the opposing team from scoring

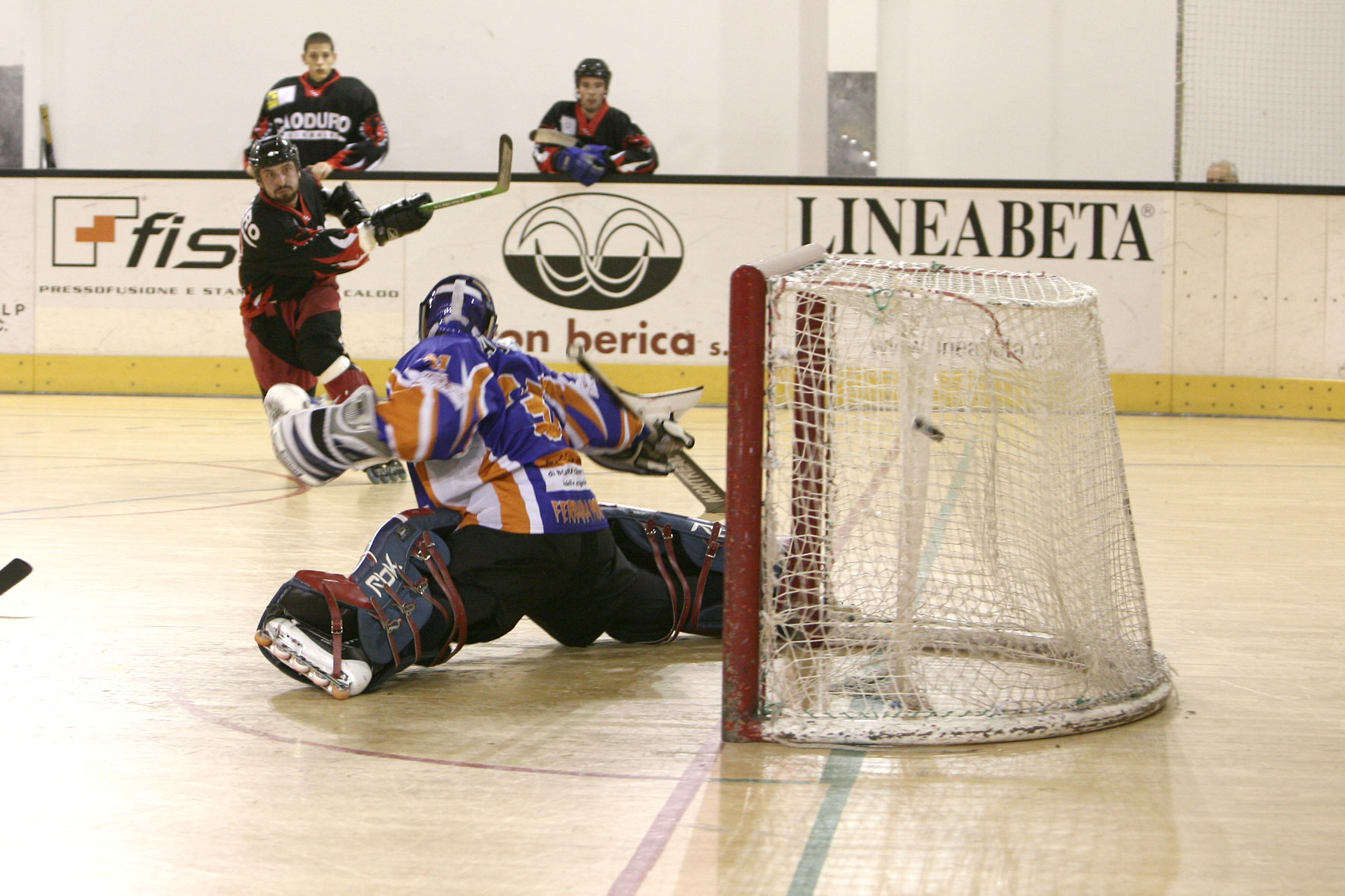
A goalkeeper in Inline hockey

In many team sports that involve scoring goals, the goalkeeper (sometimes termed goaltender, netminder, GK, goalie, keep, or keeper) is a designated player charged with directly preventing the opposing team from scoring by blocking or intercepting opposing shots on goal. Such positions exist in bandy, rink bandy, camogie, association football, Gaelic football, international rules football, floorball, handball, hurling, field hockey, ice hockey, roller hockey, lacrosse, ringette, rinkball, water polo, and shinty, as well as in other sports.

In most sports that involve scoring in a net, rules apply to the goalkeeper that do not apply to other players. These rules are often instituted to protect the goalkeeper from being a target for dangerous or even violent actions. This is most apparent in sports such as ice hockey and lacrosse, where goalkeepers are required to wear special equipment like heavy pads and a face mask to protect their bodies from the impact of the playing object (e.g., a ball or puck).

In some sports, goalkeepers may have the same rights as other players as well as additional rules applicable only to their position; in association football, for example, the keeper is allowed to kick the ball just as any other player but may also use their hands to handle the ball in a restricted area. In other sports, goalkeepers may be limited in the actions they are allowed to take or the area of the field or rink where they may be; in the NHL, for example, goalkeepers may not play the puck in the restricted areas behind the net or take the puck across the red line.

In some sports, like Cycle ball, Unicycle hockey and Roller soccer, there is no designated goalkeeper, but any player can perform that function on the condition that only one acts in that role at a time.

In some sports, like basketball, acting as a goalkeeper is considered against the rules, on the contrary, in related sport, netball, there are dedicated players to defend against scoring (Goal keeper and Goal defence).

== Examples ==
=== Football codes ===
==== Association football ====
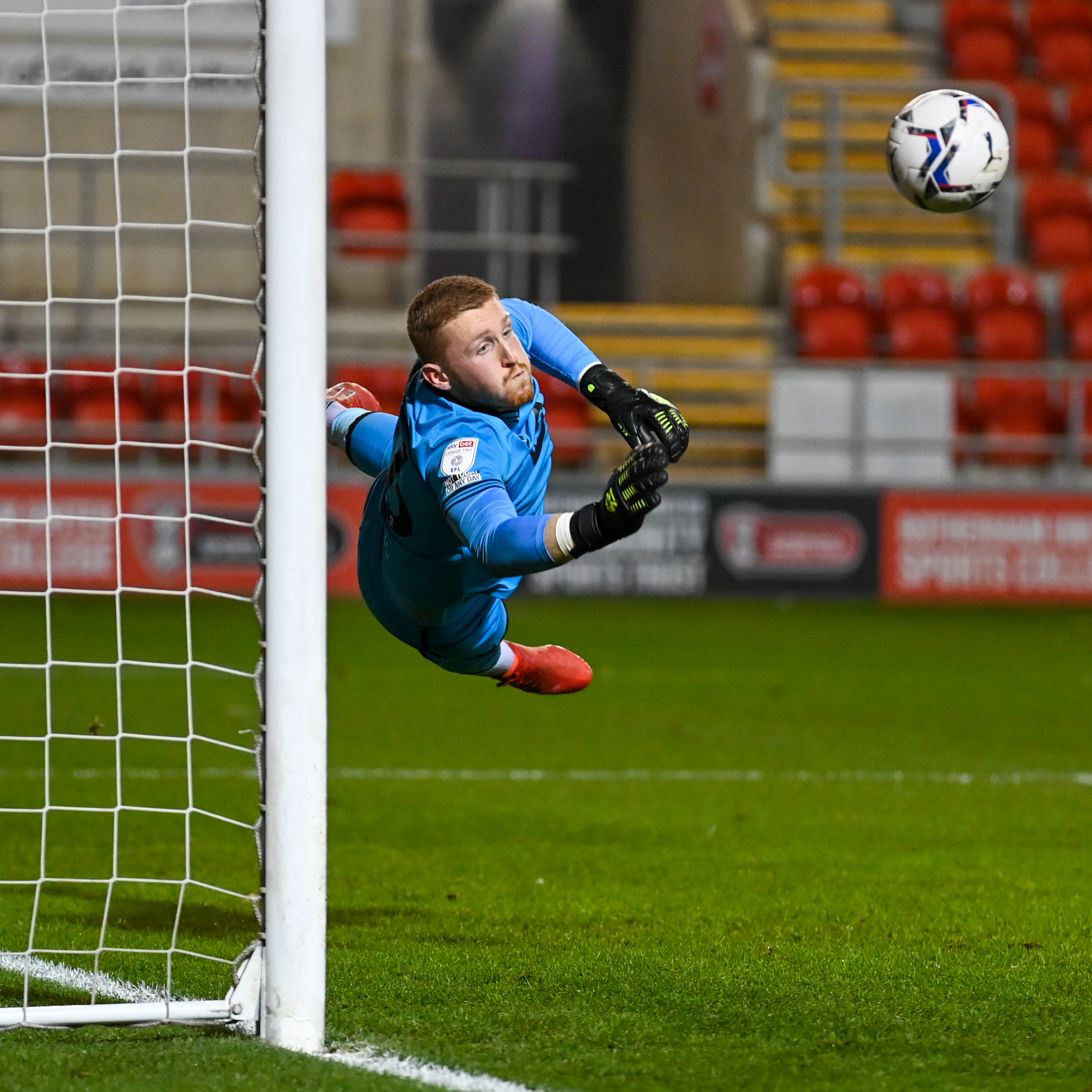
An association football goalkeeper attempts to make a diving save

In football, each team's goalkeeper (GK) defends their team's goal and has special privileges within the game. The goalkeeper's main job is to stop any penetration of the ball into the goal. The goalkeeper is the only player in the side who may use their hands and arms to catch, throw, and save the ball, but they may only do so within their own penalty area. Goalkeepers are required to wear a distinctive color jersey, separate from the referee's jersey color and either team's regular jersey color, so the referee can easily identify them. There are no other specific requirements, but goalkeepers are usually allowed to wear additional protective gear, such as padded clothing. Most goalkeepers also wear gloves to protect their hands and enhance their grip on the ball. Like every player on the pitch, they are required to wear shin guards.

The goalkeeper is allowed to catch the ball and is also allowed to punch or deflect the ball away from the goal. The goalkeeper generally has a significant advantage on a ball high in the air by raising their arms and play the ball before an attacker can attempt a header. When the keeper picks up the ball, they are allowed to kick it or throw it, or to place it on the ground and play it with their feet. The official Laws of the Game stipulate that the goalkeeper must redistribute the ball within six seconds after picking it up; however, referees often use their discretion as long as the goalkeeper is not obviously attempting to waste time. Once the keeper establishes possession of the ball, opposing players are not allowed to attempt to play the ball and must give the goalkeeper room to attempt a kick. Referees usually give an advantage to an unprotected goalkeeper if a ball is in the air and both the goalkeeper and a field player of the opposing team are challenging for the ball.

The 1936 death of Sunderland A.F.C. goalkeeper Jimmy Thorpe shaped the development of the rule by which players were no longer allowed to raise their foot to a goalkeeper with control of the ball in their arms. Despite winning the league that season, Sunderland's season was marked with tragedy after the young goalkeeper died as a result of a kick in the head and chest after he had picked up the ball following a backpass in a game against Chelsea at Roker Park. He continued to take part until the match finished, but collapsed at home afterwards and died in hospital four days later from diabetes mellitus and heart failure 'accelerated by the rough usage of the opposing team'.

Though the goalkeeper is generally allowed to use their hands in the penalty area, they are not allowed to use their hands on balls that have been deliberately kicked to them by a teammate (it does not have to go backwards). In such situations, the goalkeeper may play the ball with their feet but cannot pick it up. The rule applies only to a ball that is kicked. A ball that is headed or otherwise not kicked may be picked up by the goalkeeper without penalty. An infringement of this rule results in an indirect kick for the opposing team. A ball that is merely deflected by a teammate may still be picked up by the goalkeeper since a deflection is not a deliberate play. The "back-pass" rule has been followed in international football and in most professional and amateur leagues since it was introduced in the early 1990s to reduce timewasting, but leagues for younger players may choose not to enforce the rule. The back pass rule is listed in Law 12 of the Laws of the Game.

As the goalkeeper is usually the team's only player who can see the entire field, they often act as the organizer of the team when it is defending, such as on a free kick or a corner kick. This means the goalkeeper needs to be loud, with a voice that can project over the defensive area of the pitch. In turn, the players on their team need to be able to listen and respond to directions given to them. Some of the greatest soccer/ football goalies include Petr Cech, Peter Schmeichel, Manuel Neuer, Oliver Kahn, Edwin van der Sar, Lev Yashin, Iker Casillas, Gianluigi Buffon, Jean-Marie Pfaff, Ricardo Zamora or Michel Preud'homme.

==== Gaelic football ====
In Gaelic football, the goalie's main task is to prevent a goal from being scored against his side by directly defending the team's goal. A goal occurs when the ball passes through the goal; the attacking team is awarded 3 points. The goalie is the only player who may handle the ball on the ground, and only inside the small rectangle.

==== International rules football ====
In International rules football, a hybrid game between Australian rules football (which does not have a goalkeeper) and Gaelic football, the goalkeeper's main task is to prevent a goal from being scored. A goal occurs when the ball comes off any part of an attacking player and passes through the goal; the attacking team is awarded 6 points.

==== Gridiron football ====
The term "goal-tend" was used in early descriptions of American football positions to describe the defensive position farthest back from the line of scrimmage. Eventually the term became obsolete and was replaced by the term defensive fullback, then to its modern term free safety (or punt returner in kicking situations). Unlike in soccer or Gaelic football, the goal-tend/safety does not physically protect the goalposts, as they are elevated above the ground and mostly out of the reach of any player (the National Football League also explicitly outlawed goaltending in 1985; no such rule exists in other levels of the game). Also, unlike other codes of football, goal-tends have no special ball-handling privileges.

One situation in which a goalkeeper-like responsibility can arise is in Canadian football, where a single point is awarded for a kicked ball that is not returned out of the end zone. While standard practice is for defending teams to concede the single point, situations often arise where conceding that point could jeopardize a lead. A goal-tend can thus be employed to recover the ball and either return it out of the end zone or, generally if it is in the closing seconds of a game, punt the ball back into play or out of bounds to ensure the point is not conceded.

=== Handball ===
In handball, the goalkeeper is the only player in the team who is allowed to stay in the 6-meter zone throughout the whole competition. A goalkeeper is allowed to save the ball with all parts of their body, including two hands, trunks, two legs and so on, only within the defending 6-meter zone.

Whenever the ball is left on the ground within the 6-meter zone, the goalkeeper owns the possession of the ball; while whenever the ball is in the air above the 6-meter zone, the opponent can still jump in to grasp the ball without stepping in the 6-meter zone.

A goalkeeper can participate in offense by long-passing the ball to a teammate in the opposing half court for a fast-break score. The common handball goalkeeper clothing includes a long-sleeve jersey, long trousers, and any body protection (such as base layer or protective cup).

==== Czech handball ====
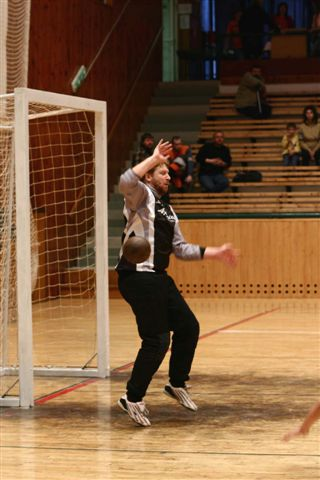
Czech handball goalkeeper

In Czech handball the goalkeeper is the only player allowed kick the ball during play, and only if defending a shot inside the goal area (other players may only have contact with the ball above the knee). Attackers may enter the goal area but not shoot from inside it. The goalkeeper may not enter the other team's defensive third. Goalkeepers take penalty throws when the ball goes out of play behind their goal area with no deflection from the goal. The referee must allow a change of goalkeepers before penalty and free throws. Goalkeepers must wear a different colour jersey from the other players.

=== Hockey ===
==== With sticks ====
===== Broomball =====
The role of the goalie or goaltender in Broomball is to prevent the ball from entering the net using their broom and body. In official games they must wear a face protector and helmet in addition to the normal protective clothing used in the game. They are additionally allowed to use one blocker glove and leg guards. Most goaltender privileges only apply when inside the goal area, for example being allowed to close their hand over the ball or send it out of play. Goaltenders are not sent to the penalty bench for infractions; instead, another team member is nominated to take their place. Goaltenders may not cross the centre line or play the ball across it. Goaltender substitutions may be made at any stoppage as often as desired.

===== Field hockey =====
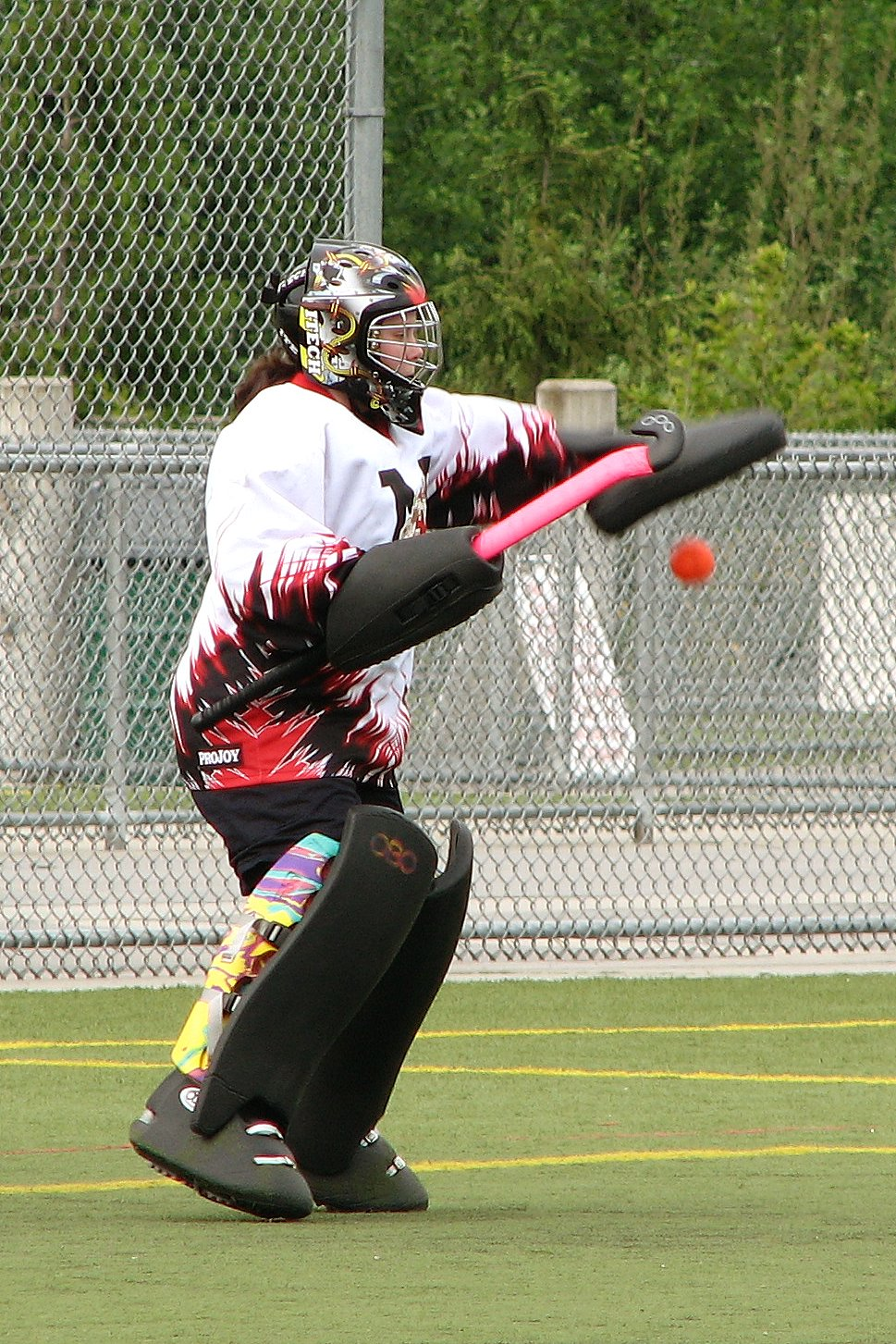
A field hockey goalkeeper

In field hockey, the goalkeeper generally wears extensive protective equipment including helmet, face and neck guards, chest and leg padding, arm or elbow protectors, specific gloves (the left glove is designed purely to block the ball, the right glove also has this function but in addition is designed to permit the goalkeeper to hold and use his or her stick), lower leg guards (known as pads) and shoe covers (known as kickers). The gloves, pads and kickers are almost always made of special high density foam material that both protects the goalkeeper and has excellent rebound qualities. The goalkeeper is also equipped with a stick; either one designed for goalies or one as used for normal play. Specialist goalkeeper sticks must conform to the same dimensional limitations as field players' sticks but are designed for optimal use with one hand and for blocking rather than hitting the ball. From 2007 teams may elect to play with 11 field players, and no-one has the privileges of a goalkeeper. If a goalkeeper is used, they fall into one of two categories: a fully equipped goalkeeper must wear a helmet, unless they are nominated to take a penalty stroke against the opposing goalkeeper, wear a different colored shirt and at least foot and leg guards (arm and upper-body protection is optional); or they may opt to wear only a helmet. The goalkeeper is allowed to use any part of their body to play or deflect the ball, although they can't obstruct its play (for example by lying on top of it), and they can only do so within the goal circle (or "D"). Outside the D they are subject to the same rules as field players and may only use their stick to play the ball. Goalkeepers who are wearing a helmet are not permitted to pass their team's 23 m line, with the exception of goalkeepers who take penalty strokes. However, a goalkeeper who has elected to wear only a helmet is permitted to remove it and provided it is not left on the field of play, they may take part in the game in any part of the pitch, and retain their goalkeeping privileges, even if they do not have time to replace the helmet before making a save. It is compulsory to wear a helmet when defending a penalty stroke or penalty corner.

===== Ice hockey =====
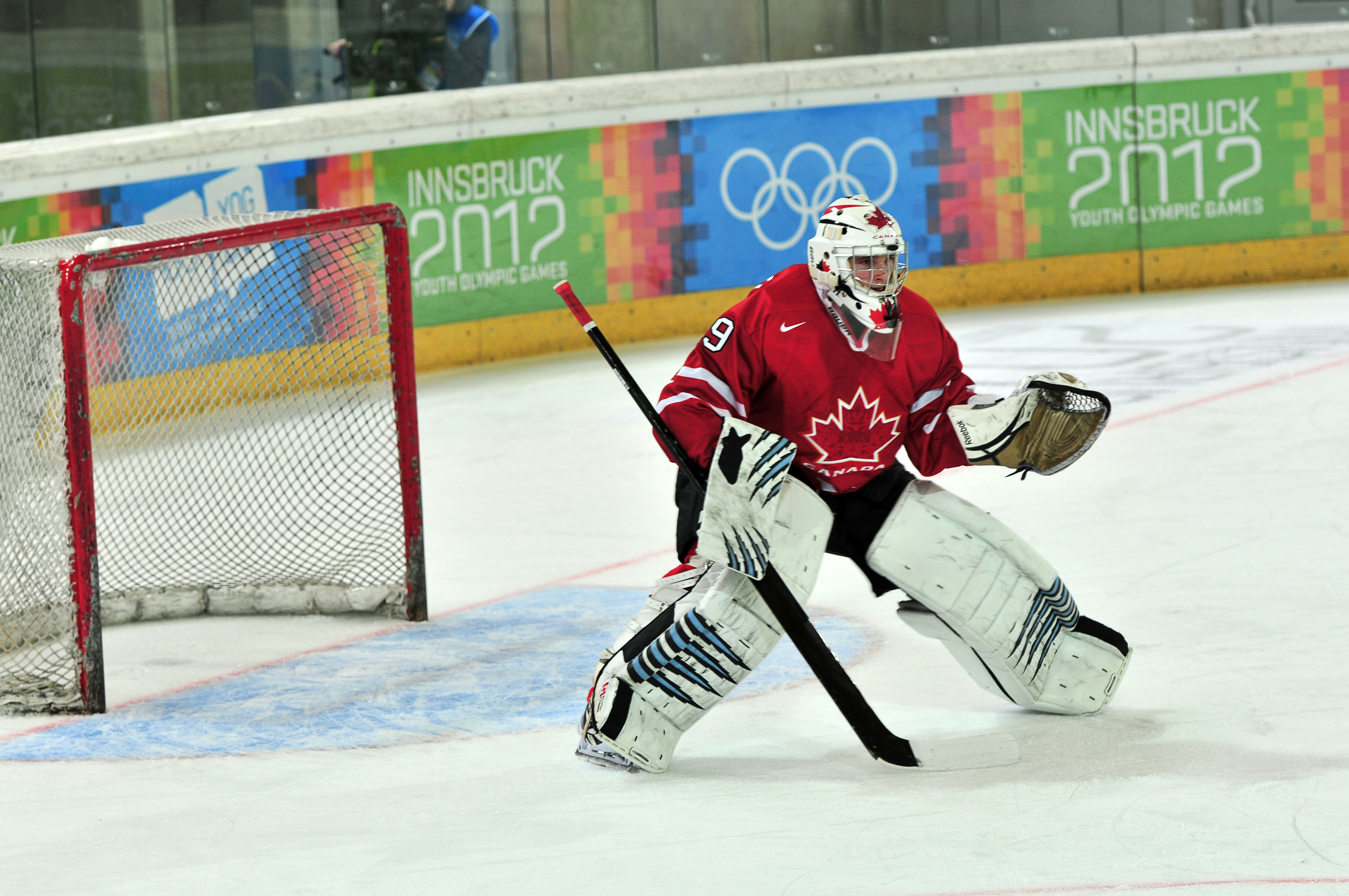
An ice hockey goalkeeper or "goalie"

In ice hockey, goalkeepers are more commonly referred to as "goaltenders" or simply "goalies". They defend their team's goal zone (net) by stopping shots of the puck from entering the net, thus preventing the opposing team from scoring. The goaltender usually plays in or near the area in front of the net called the goal crease (often referred to simply as the crease or the net). Because of the power of shots, the goaltender wears specific equipment designed to protect the body from direct impact. As is true with most other sports, only one goaltender is allowed to be on the playing area for each team at any one time.

==== Sans sticks ====
===== Bandy =====
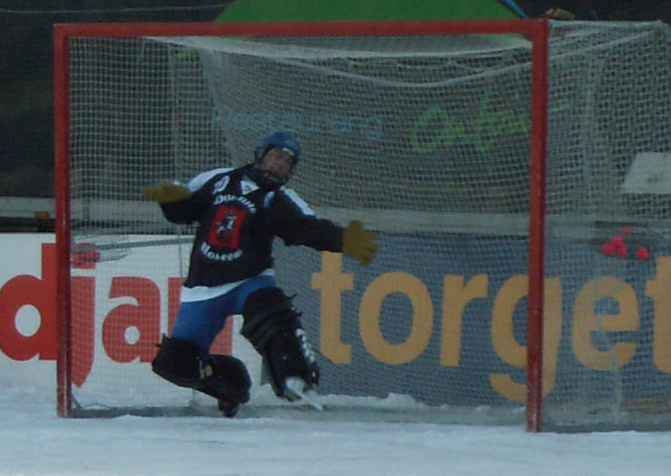
Kirill Khvalko of Dynamo Moscow attempting a save

In bandy, the goalkeeper defends their team's goal and has specific privileges within the game, which is regulated in section 6 of the Bandy Playing Rules set up by the Federation of International Bandy The goalkeeper's main job is to stop any penetration of the ball into the goal. The goalkeeper is allowed to hold the ball for six seconds before they have to release it. They may drop it to a defender or chuck it directly into attack.

If the ball passes the goal line, it is followed by different actions: if a defender last touches the ball, the reaction is an own goal if the ball goes between the goalposts; if it passes outside the goalposts, the reaction is a corner stroke. If last touched by an attacker's stick and passes between the posts, the reaction is a goal or a disallowed goal (offside or an infringement from the attacking team). If the ball passes from an attacker over the goal line outside the goalposts, the goalkeeper may retrieve a new ball from a cage hanging on the goal's either side and put the new ball in play with no signal from the referees.

The goalkeeper is the only player who may use their hands to play the ball (although only within their own penalty area). According to Rule 6.1 the goalkeeper is required to wear a jersey with a different color from either team's jersey color to avoid confusion for the referee. Goalkeepers wear padded gloves to aid in catching the ball, large shinpads, a padded sweater, and a helmet with a face mask.

The goalkeeper is the only player in the team who can pass the ball to a teammate by aid of their skates. The team might have a reserve goalkeeper, and the two may switch at any time during the game, without the need to notify the referee. There is no time-out in bandy, but an exception is sometimes made when the goalkeeper is hurt, especially if they don't have a designated reserve keeper.

As the goalkeeper is usually the team's only player who can see the entire field, they often act as an organizer of the team when it is defending, especially for free strokes against them.

===== Floorball =====
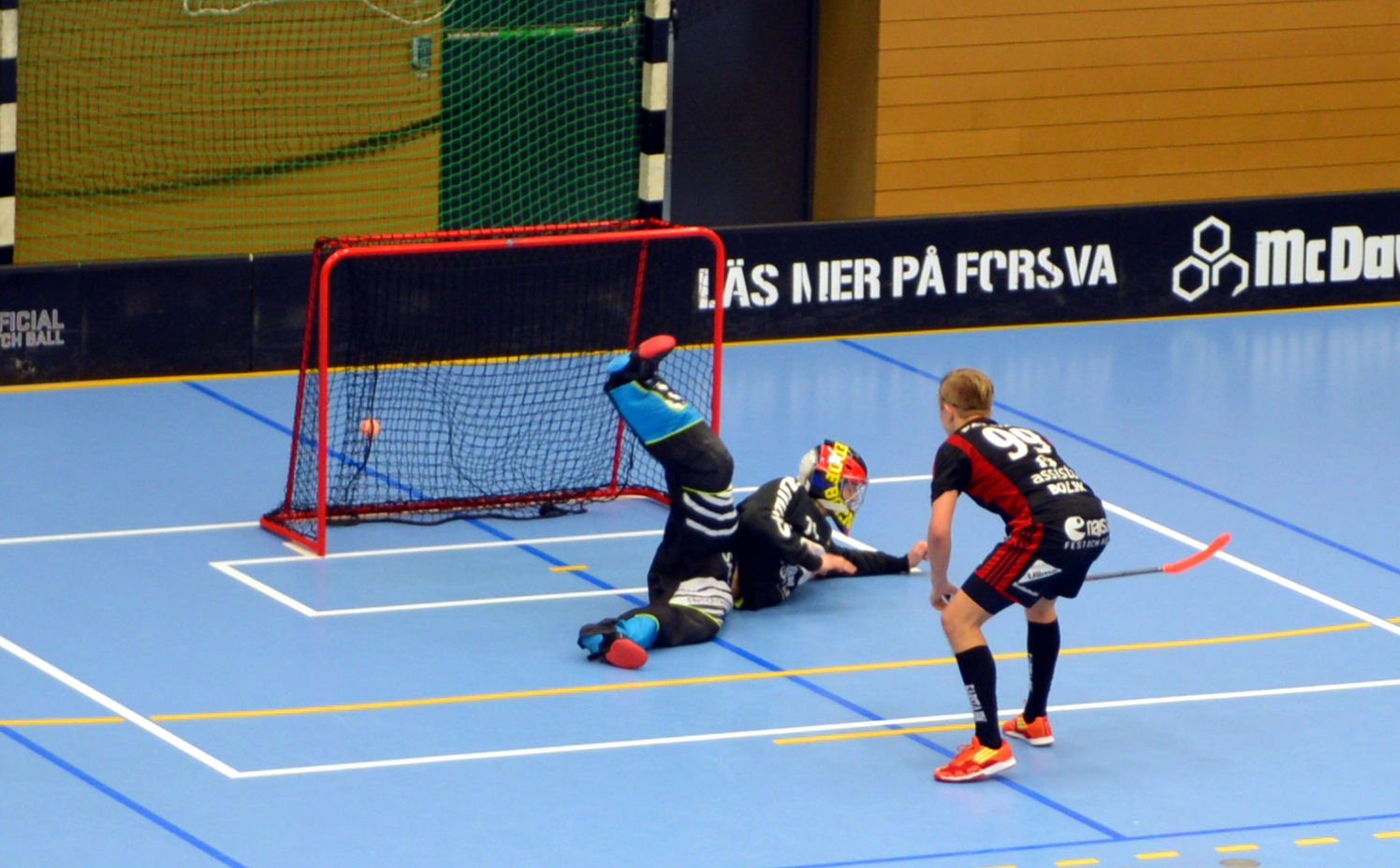
Floorball goalkeeper failing at stopping opposing team's player from hitting the ball in the goal

In floorball, the goalkeeper defends their team's goal and has specific rules to follow within the game. The goalkeeper is the only player who may use their hands to play the ball. Goalkeepers do not have sticks, and they move in the goal crease on their knees, attempting to save the shots on goal. When the goalkeeper has possession of the ball, they have 3 seconds to throw it back into the game. The goalkeeper may not control the ball outside of his crease, except when kicking it. Goalkeepers are an essential part of starting plays, as they can throw the ball for a quick offensive chance. When throwing, the ball has to touch the goalkeeper's own side first before crossing the center line. Goalkeepers are also important in organizing their team's games, as they see the whole field better. Any contact against the goalkeeper (slashing, interference etc.) will result in a free shot or a 2-minute penalty. Like in ice hockey, the goalkeeper may be substituted for an extra attacker, if a delayed penalty occurs, or if his team needs a goal to tie the game in the final moments of the game. Goalkeepers may score goals, although this is not the case in some leagues. In floorball games, more goals are often scored than in, for example, ice hockey, because of the extremely quick tempo of the game and fast shots.

The only mandatory equipment for goalkeepers are masks, goalie-shirts, goalie-pants and shoes. Most goalkeepers also wear gloves. They may also optionally wear other protective equipment, such as knee pads, elbow-guards, shin-guards, jocks and torso armor. In some junior/independent leagues, many goalkeepers don't even wear goalie-shirts, but hooded tops.

=== Hurling ===
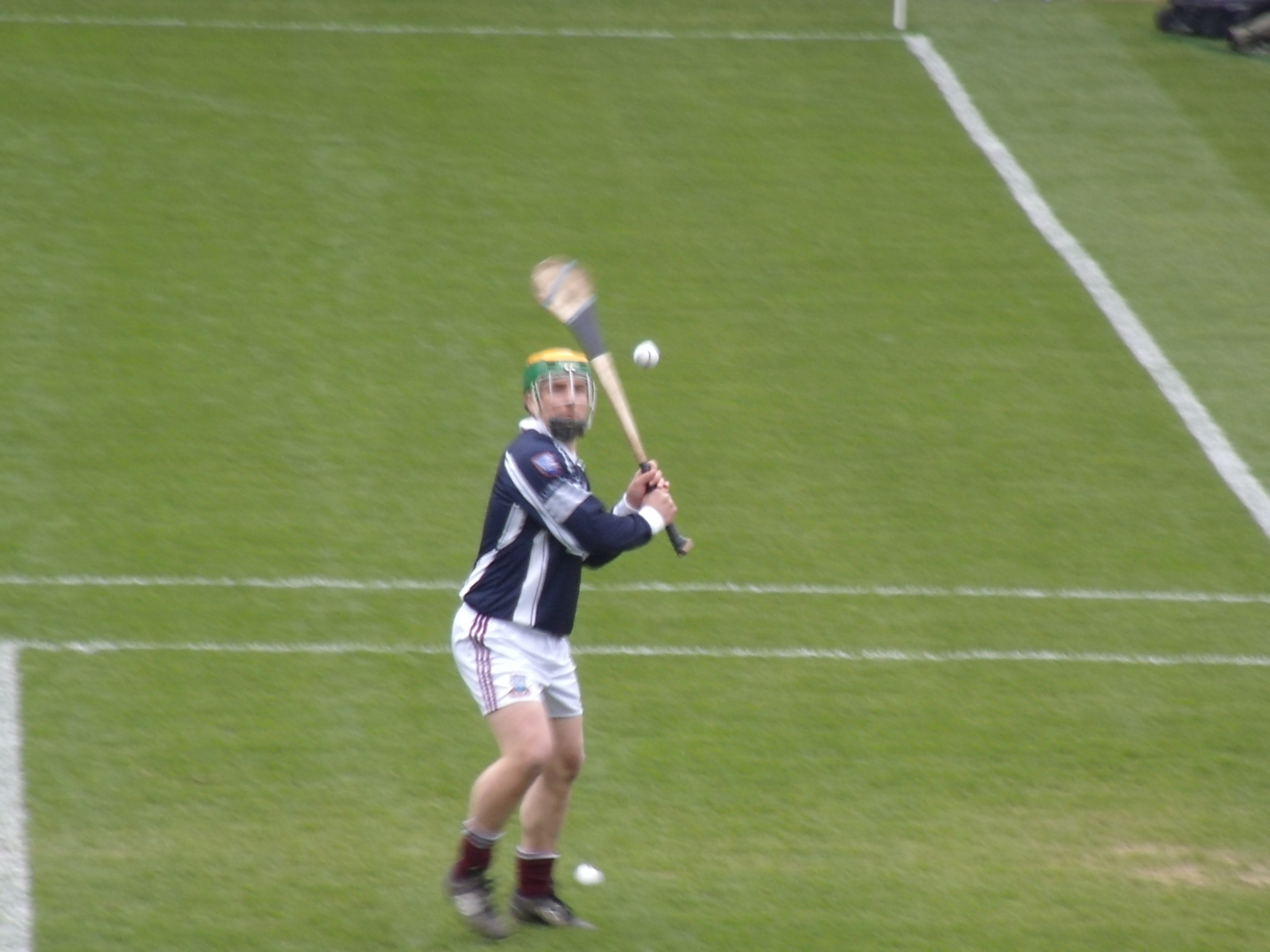
Hurling goalkeeper

In hurling, the goalkeeper's main task is to prevent a goal from being scored against their side by directly defending the team's goal. The goalkeeper also takes "puckouts" after a score or wide ball. A goal occurs when the ball passes through the goal; the attacking team is awarded 3 points. The goalkeeper has one specific rule pertaining to him, opposing players may not directly physically challenge the goalkeeper while they are in possession of the ball in the small parallelogram, while if the goalkeeper leaves the small parallelogram, they are subject to the same rules as all other players. The goalkeeper wears a different color jersey, e.g., if a team has blue jerseys with white font, the goalkeeper will wear a white jersey of the same design with blue font. Most goalkeepers use a specific hurley with a wider bas (flat face) to aid shot-stopping.

=== Shinty ===
In shinty and women's shinty the goalkeeper is the only player allowed to touch the ball with their hands. However, this does not extend to catching or holding the ball and the legal move is described as a 'slap', and the exception only applies within the ten yard area. The goalkeeper, like the rest of the players, may also use the caman/stick, the chest, two feet together or one foot on the ground to block the ball. Goalkeepers must wear a different colour jersey from the other players.

=== Lacrosse ===
==== Box lacrosse ====
Since the creation of indoor or box lacrosse in the 1930s, a unique form of lacrosse goaltender was formed for the different dynamics of lacrosse on an ice-less ice hockey pad.

==== Field lacrosse ====
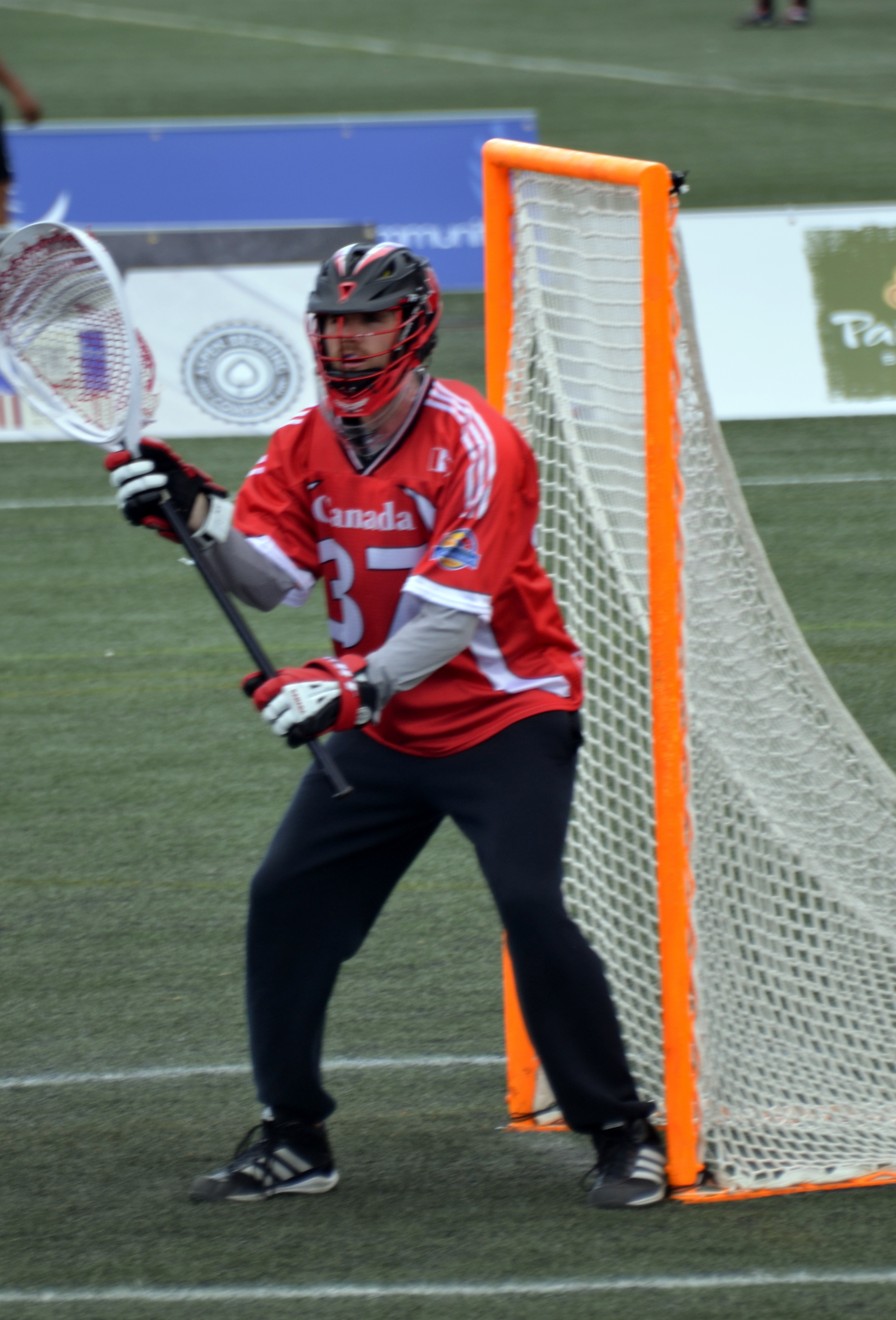
Field lacrosse goaltender

In men's field lacrosse, the designated goalkeeper is allowed to have a stick from 40inches to 72inches long and the head of a goalkeeper's crosse may measure up to 12inches wide. This is significantly larger than field players' heads to assist in blocking shots. Once a goalkeeper makes a save and has control of the ball in his crosse (stick), he may only remain in possession of the ball inside the protective crease for four seconds (the length may depend on the level of play). Before the four seconds is up, the goalkeeper must either pass the ball or leave the crease. After leaving, he may not re-enter the crease with possession of the ball.

While inside the crease (nine feet in radius), offensive players may not make contact with the goalie or his stick. Doing so is declared "goalie interference" and is penalized by a free clear to the half field line. There is a significant difference between NCAA/MLL rules and international rules regarding a pass while the goalkeeper is inside the crease: under NCAA/MLL rules, contact with a goalie's stick while in the act of passing, even after the ball is released, is prohibited and considered interference. Under international rules, protection ends when possession ends. Contact with a goalie's stick after the ball is released, is legal. A goalie is allowed to make contact with the ball with his hand, although he is not allowed to control it or pick it up.

In women's lacrosse, once a goalkeeper makes a save and has control of the ball in her crosse, she may remain in possession of the ball inside the crease for ten seconds. The interference rule is similar to men's lacrosse; unlike in the men's game, a woman goalkeeper is allowed to control or even pick up the ball in her hand.

In both men's and women's lacrosse, goalkeepers are required to wear a helmet and 4-point chinstrap, a throat protector, gloves, and a chest protector. Use of a protective cup is, for obvious reasons, required in the men's game; thigh pads and shin guards are also being required for women goalkeepers as of 2007. Although they are permitted to, few goalkeepers elect to wear optional protective equipment, including elbow and shoulder pads, thigh pads and shin guards, and long sweatpants.

=== Netball ===
In netball, the role of the Goal Keeper (denoted GK) is to prevent opposing players from shooting. This can be done by deflecting and intercepting passes and shots, collecting rebound balls from failed shots, and strategically influencing opposing players' positions in the shooting circle. Only the positions Goalkeeper and Goal Defence are allowed within the opposing shooting circle, from within which all scoring shots must be taken by the other team's Goal Attack and Goal Shooter. The Goal Keeper usually defends the opposing team's Goal Shooter. In accordance with the general rules of netball, the Goalkeeper must be a minimum of three feet away from the landing foot position of a player in possession of the ball when attempting to block, otherwise an obstruction penalty pass/shot is awarded to the other side's player in which the Goal Keeper must stand by the player's side and out of play until the ball is thrown. The Goal Keeper must stay within the defensive third of the court.

=== Water polo ===
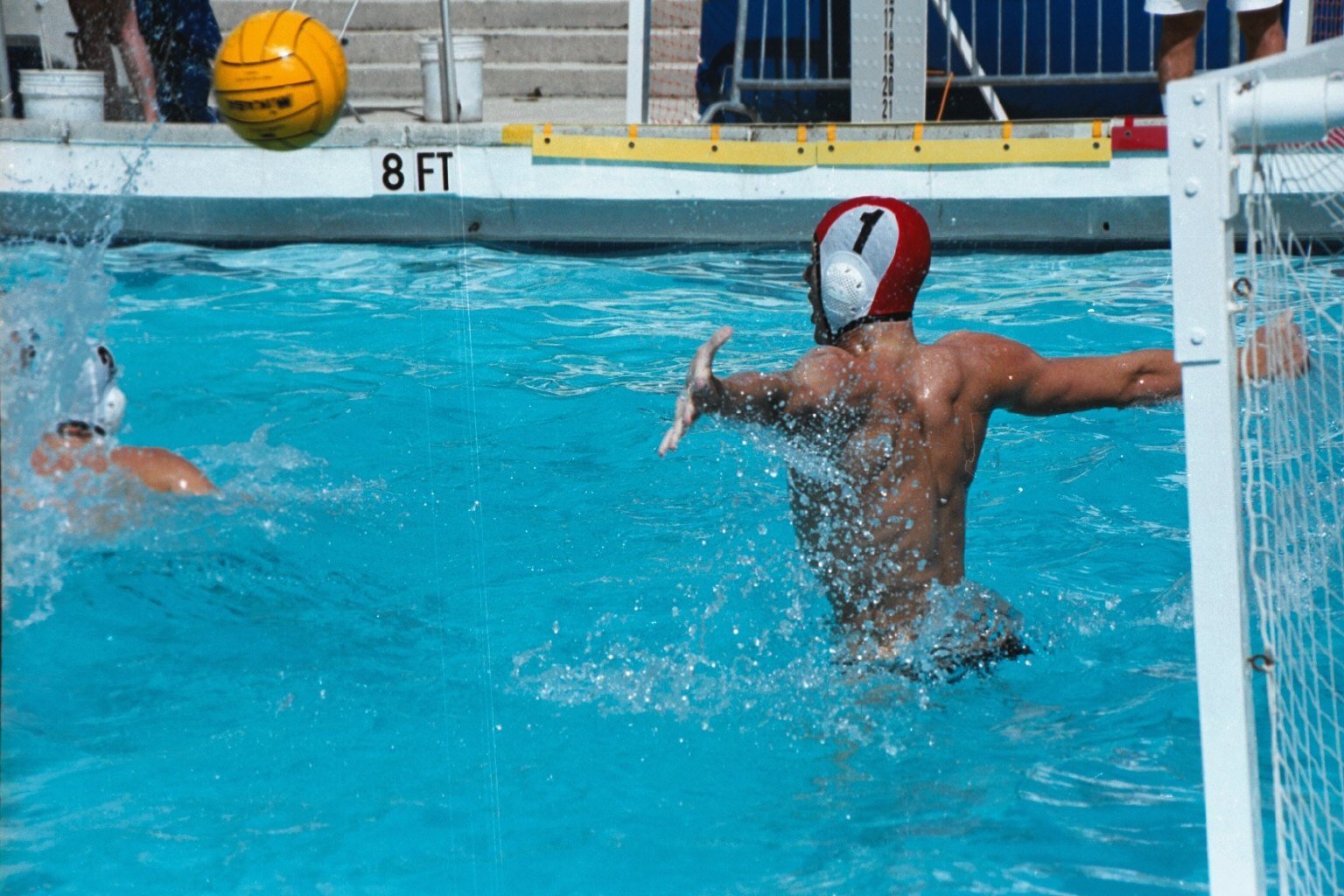
Goalie eggbeatering (also known as water-jumping or froggy-kicking) up to block a shot.

Goalkeepers in water polo are given specific rules to follow when inside the five-meter area including the ability to touch the ball with two hands, the ability to stand, and the ability to punch the ball with a clenched fist. However, the goalkeeper may not cross the half-distance line while non-goalkeeper players can.

The rule change in 2006, according to the NFHS 2006–2007 swimming/diving and water polo rulebook, made the four and seven-meter lines merge into a five-meter line. A goalie may now, under revised rules, go beyond the 5m line according to the field rules (one hand) and not pass the half line and use two hands.

The new cap rules resulted in a goalie cap must now be in quarters alternating red/dark for home and red/white for away, the goalie must be number 1, 13, or 15, and for females: a red swim cap must be worn under the goalie cap, a team's dark swim cap is no longer acceptable as it is hard to distinguish a goalie from field players if the official cap is off. USWP and NCAA rules vary slightly.

The water polo goalkeeper is the least protected goalkeeper without gloves or body protection.

== Goalkeepers on coins and postage stamps ==
Goalkeepers are regarded as one of the hardest positions to play therefore they can have a huge impact on a countries culture. Goalkeepers have been used on some collectors' coins and medals such as the Austrian 5 euro 100 years of football coin that was minted on 12 May 2004. The coin depicts a successful shot by a footballer, shown in the background, with the ball just passing the Austrian goalkeeper, Samuel Ali (still in the air) into the goal.
