= List of Swedish bandy championship finals (1907–1949) =

The Swedish bandy championship final is a yearly event concluding the bandy season in Sweden and deciding the Swedish bandy champions.

From 1907 to 1930, the finalists were decided from a cup tournament and from 1931 the finalists have been decided from a play-off tournament of the top-tier of the Swedish bandy league system.

The first final was held in 1907, when IFK Uppsala beat IFK Gävle with 4–1 in Boulognerskogen, Gävle.

In 1912, two winners were declared, because no replay of the tied final could be played due to the weather.

Below is a list of finals from 1907 to 1949.

== 1907 ==
17 March 1907

IFK Uppsala	4–1	IFK Gävle
	Report	Afzelius

Boulognerskogen, Gävle

IFK Uppsala
(Sweden) Adolf Cederström
(Sweden) Karl Ågren
(Sweden) Sven Ågren
(Sweden) Hilding Ångström
(Sweden) Nils Howander
(Sweden) Hilding Kjellman
(Sweden) Melker Sandelin
(Sweden) Nils Andén
(Sweden) Sune Almkvist
(Sweden) Hans Lindman
(Sweden) Herbert Ekbom

IFK Gävle
(Sweden) Gustaf Engström
(Sweden) Jappe Lindbom
(Sweden) Tore Lindbom
(Sweden) Calle Flodin
(Sweden) Kalle Forslund
(Sweden) "Codde" Bergström
(Sweden) Sven Pettersson
(Sweden) August Johansson
(Sweden) "Monte" Afzelius	(1)
(Sweden) Hans Jakob Mattsson
(Sweden) Ruben Mattsson
(Sweden) Harald Stålhammar

== 1908 ==
1 March 1908

Djurgårdens IF	3–1	Östergötlands BF
G. Friberg; I. Friberg; Johansson	Report	Kling

Idrottsparken, Norrköping

Djurgårdens IF
(Sweden) Bror Modén
(Sweden) Gunnar Friberg	(1)
(Sweden) Karl Öhman
(Sweden) Algot Nilsson
(Sweden) Götrik Frykman
(Sweden) Birger Walla
(Sweden) Arvid Spångberg
(Sweden) Ivar Friberg	(1)
(Sweden) Erik Lavass
(Sweden) Erik Andéhn
(Sweden) Gottfrid Johansson	(1)

Östergötlands BF
(Sweden) E. Samuelsson
(Sweden) Ivar Andersson
(Sweden) K. Köhler
(Sweden) S. Nordmark
(Sweden) Harald Kindahl
(Sweden) Gottfrid Johansson
(Sweden) E. Gustafsson
(Sweden) Curt Hartzell
(Sweden) Stephan Kling	(1)
(Sweden) Axel Strååth
(Sweden) Einar Pettersson

== 1909 ==
9 February 1909

AIK	7–3	Djurgårdens IF
	Report

Idrottsparken, Stockholm

AIK
(Sweden) Martin Åkerberg
(Sweden) Theodor Malm
(Sweden) Clas Berg
(Sweden) Folke Hellstedt
(Sweden) Knut Nilsson
(Sweden) Torsten Tegnér
(Sweden) Samuel Bresky
(Sweden) Magnus Cleve
(Sweden) John Söderström
(Sweden) C. Egerström
(Sweden) G. Malmsten

Djurgårdens IF
(Sweden) Knut Gustavsson
(Sweden) Gunnar Friberg
(Sweden) Karl Öhman
(Sweden) Ragnar Wicksell
(Sweden) Ivar Friberg
(Sweden) Erik Lavass
(Sweden) A. Friberg
(Sweden) Götrik Frykman
(Sweden) Gottfrid Johansson
(Sweden) Bussler

== 1910 ==
6 March 1910

IFK Uppsala	2–0	IFK Stockholm
Traung; Almkvist	Report

Albanobanan, Stockholm
Referee: Ruben Gelbord

IFK Uppsala
(Sweden) Emil Wennberg
(Sweden) Hugo Thorell
(Sweden) Sven Ågren
(Sweden) Melcher Sandelin
(Sweden) Nils Howander
(Sweden) Adrian Brolin
(Sweden) Seth Howander
(Sweden) Ernst Traung	(1)
(Sweden) Sune Almkvist	(1)
(Sweden) Hans Lindman
(Sweden) Herbert Ekbom

IFK Stockholm
(Sweden) N. Pettersson
(Sweden) K. Lindroth
(Sweden) Bo Lindeberg
(Sweden) H. Ohlsson
(Sweden) Axel Ahlberg
(Sweden) Nils Georgii
(Sweden) Arne Törsleff
(Sweden) J. Melin
(Sweden) E. Lindroth
(Sweden) Torsten Husén
(Sweden) S. Lindström

== 1911 ==
5 March 1911

IFK Uppsala	6–0	Djurgårdens IF
Traung (2); Almkvist (2); N. Howander; Ekbom	Report

Studenternas IP, Uppsala
Referee: P. Sjöblom

IFK Uppsala
(Sweden) Emil Wennberg
(Sweden) Louis Woodzack
(Sweden) Sven Ågren
(Sweden) Hilding Ångström
(Sweden) Nils Howander	(1)
(Sweden) Adrian Brolin
(Sweden) Jim Howander
(Sweden) Ernst Traung	(2)
(Sweden) Sune Almkvist	(2)
(Sweden) Hans Lindman
(Sweden) Herbert Ekbom	(1)

Djurgårdens IF
(Sweden) Knut Gustafsson
(Sweden) Gusten Friberg
(Sweden) Karl Öhman
(Sweden) Ragnar Wicksell
(Sweden) Ivar Friberg
(Sweden) Erik Lavass
(Sweden) A. Friberg
(Sweden) Götrik Frykman
(Sweden) Gottfrid Johansson
(Sweden) Bussler
(Sweden) ???

== 1912 ==
Both sides were declared champions since no replay could be played.

17 March 1912

IFK Uppsala	1–1	Djurgårdens IF
Almkvist	Report	Johansson

Råstasjön, Solna
Referee: Axel Ahlberg

IFK Uppsala
(Sweden) Emil Wennberg
(Sweden) Louis Woodzack
(Sweden) Erik Bolin
(Sweden) Einar Lindqvist
(Sweden) Adrian Brolin
(Sweden) Georg Melchert
(Sweden) Jim Howander
(Sweden) Hans Lindman
(Sweden) Sune Almkvist	(1)
(Sweden) Herbert Olivecrona
(Sweden) Ernst Traung

Djurgårdens IF
(Sweden) Knut Gustafsson
(Sweden) Ragnar Wicksell
(Sweden) Karl Öhman
(Sweden) Erik Lavass
(Sweden) Götrik Frykman
(Sweden) Folke Wahlgren
(Sweden) John Söderberg
(Sweden) Sten Söderberg
(Sweden) Karl-Gunnar Karlsson-Arnö
(Sweden) Gottfrid Johansson	(1)
(Sweden) Ivar Friberg

== 1913 ==
2 March 1913

IFK Uppsala	2–1	AIK
Traung; Almkvist	Report

Stockholm Olympic Stadium, Stockholm
Attendance: 2,000
Referee: Hjalmar Bohlin

IFK Uppsala
(Sweden) Seth Howander
(Sweden) Louis Woodzack
(Sweden) Erik Bolin
(Sweden) Georg Melchert
(Sweden) Adrian Brolin
(Sweden) Einar Lindqvist
(Sweden) Hans Lindman
(Sweden) Ernst Traung	(1)
(Sweden) Sune Almkvist	(1)
(Sweden) Herbert Olivecrona
(Sweden) Herbert Ekbom

AIK
(Sweden) Gösta Berendt
(Sweden) Erik Andersson-Arve
(Sweden) Theodor Malm
(Sweden) Erik Runeborg
(Sweden) Knut Nilsson
(Sweden) Torsten Tegnér
(Sweden) Carl Erik Pettersson
(Sweden) Carl Gustaf Wigerth
(Sweden) John Söderström
(Sweden) B. Ewerlöf
(Sweden) Stille

== 1914 ==
1 March 1914

AIK	4–2	Djurgårdens IF
	Report

Albanobanan, Stockholm
Attendance: 1,800
Referee: K. E. Holm

AIK
(Sweden) Gösta Berendt
(Sweden) Theodor Malm
(Sweden) Erik Arve
(Sweden) Erik Runeborg
(Sweden) Knut Nilsson
(Sweden) Torsten Tegnér
(Sweden) Carl Erik Pettersson
(Sweden) C. G. Wigerth
(Sweden) John Söderström
(Sweden) B. Ewerlöf
(Sweden) Oscar Bergkvist

Djurgårdens IF
(Sweden) Knut Gustafsson
(Sweden) Backlund
(Sweden) Karl Öhman
(Sweden) Folke Wahlgren
(Sweden) Algot Nilsson
(Sweden) Fred Skoglund
(Sweden) Gottfrid Johansson
(Sweden) Götrik Frykman
(Sweden) Melcher Johansson
(Sweden) Ragnar Wicksell
(Sweden) Malmsten

== 1915 ==
21 February 1915

IFK Uppsala	2–0	AIK
Bohlin (2)	Report

Albanobanan, Stockholm
Attendance: 1,500
Referee: B. Modin (Gävle)

IFK Uppsala
(Sweden) Sven Säfwenberg
(Sweden) Louis Woodzack
(Sweden) Einar Lindqvist
(Sweden) Seth Howander
(Sweden) Nils Howander
(Sweden) Axel Johansson-Ulfsjöö
(Sweden) Georg Melchert
(Sweden) Ernst Traung
(Sweden) Sune Almkvist
(Sweden) Bertil Bohlin	(2)
(Sweden) Herbert Olivecrona

AIK
(Sweden) Hålenius
(Sweden) Erik Arve
(Sweden) Theodor Malm
(Sweden) Erik Runeborg
(Sweden) Knut Nilsson
(Sweden) C. Abrahamsson
(Sweden) Valfrid Gunnarsson
(Sweden) C. G. Wigerth
(Sweden) John Söderström
(Sweden) B. Ewerlöf
(Sweden) Oscar Bergkvist

== 1916 ==
20 February 1916

IFK Uppsala	3–2	Djurgårdens IF
Woodzack; Almkvist; Ekbom	Report	Skoglund; Karlsson-Arnö

Stockholm Olympic Stadium, Stockholm
Attendance: 2,500
Referee: Ruben Gelbord

IFK Uppsala
(Sweden) Sven Säfwenberg
(Sweden) Seth Howander
(Sweden) Einar Lindqvist
(Sweden) Axel Ulfsjöö
(Sweden) Nils Howander
(Sweden) Adrian Blom
(Sweden) Erik Howander
(Sweden) Louis Woodzack	(1)
(Sweden) Sune Almkvist	(1)
(Sweden) Bertil Bohlin
(Sweden) Herbert Ekbom	(1)

Djurgårdens IF
(Sweden) Andersson
(Sweden) Backlund
(Sweden) Karl Öhman
(Sweden) Reuterswärd
(Sweden) Ragnar Wicksell
(Sweden) Fred Skoglund	(1)
(Sweden) Lööf
(Sweden) Karl-Gunnar Karlsson-Arnö	(1)
(Sweden) Melcher Johansson
(Sweden) Eriksson
(Sweden) Gottfrid Johansson

== 1917 ==
12 February 1917

IFK Uppsala	11–2	AIK
Bohlin (5); Almkvist (4); Lindqvist; Woodzack	Report	Wigerth (2)

Stockholm Olympic Stadium, Stockholm
Attendance: 2,500
Referee: K. Lundstedt

IFK Uppsala
(Sweden) Sven Säfwenberg
(Sweden) Erik Bolin
(Sweden) Einar Lindqvist	(1)
(Sweden) Axel Ulfsjöö
(Sweden) Nils Howander
(Sweden) Adrian Brolin
(Sweden) Ruben Carlsson
(Sweden) Louis Woodzack	(1)
(Sweden) Sune Almkvist	(4)
(Sweden) Bertil Bohlin	(5)
(Sweden) Herbert Ekbom

AIK
(Sweden) R. Eriksson
(Sweden) C. Abrahamssom
(Sweden) Theodor Malm
(Sweden) Helge Ekroth
(Sweden) Knut Nilsson
(Sweden) Berlin
(Sweden) E. Abrahamsson
(Sweden) Oscar Bergkvist
(Sweden) Valfrid Gunnarsson
(Sweden) C. G. Wigerth	(2)
(Sweden) C. E. Pettersson

== 1918 ==
24 February 1918

IFK Uppsala	2–2	IK Sirius
Brolin; Woodzack	Report	Nordström; Holmér

Stockholm Olympic Stadium, Stockholm
Attendance: 5,500
Referee: Ruben Gelbord

IFK Uppsala
(Sweden) Sven Säfwenberg
(Sweden) Seth Howander
(Sweden) Einar Lindqvist
(Sweden) Erik Bolin
(Sweden) Seth Marell
(Sweden) Adrian Brolin	(1)
(Sweden) Ruben Carlsson
(Sweden) Louis Woodzack	(1)
(Sweden) Sune Almkvist
(Sweden) Bertil Bohlin
(Sweden) Seth Månsson

IK Sirius
(Sweden) Bie Svanström
(Sweden) Ivar Svanström
(Sweden) Elias Knutsson
(Sweden) Rudolf Berglin
(Sweden) Josua Höglund
(Sweden) Gustaf Bard
(Sweden) Ruben Knutsson
(Sweden) Jacob Nordström	(1)
(Sweden) Herman Peijel
(Sweden) Gösse Holmér	(1)
(Sweden) Harry Eriksson

3 March 1918
Replay

IFK Uppsala	4–1	IK Sirius
Bohlin (3); Almkvist	Report	Holmér

Studenternas IP, Uppsala
Attendance: 2,500
Referee: Kurt Nilsson

IFK Uppsala
(Sweden) Sven Säfwenberg
(Sweden) Seth Howander
(Sweden) Einar Lindqvist
(Sweden) Erik Bolin
(Sweden) Seth Marell
(Sweden) Adrian Brolin
(Sweden) Ruben Carlsson
(Sweden) Louis Woodzack
(Sweden) Sune Almkvist	(1)
(Sweden) Bertil Bohlin	(3)
(Sweden) Seth Månsson

IK Sirius
(Sweden) Bie Svanström
(Sweden) Ivar Svanström
(Sweden) Elias Knutsson
(Sweden) Rudolf Berglin
(Sweden) Josua Höglund
(Sweden) Gustaf Bard
(Sweden) Ruben Knutsson
(Sweden) Jacob Nordström
(Sweden) Herman Peijel
(Sweden) Gösse Holmér	(1)
(Sweden) Harry Eriksson

== 1919 ==
16 February 1919

IFK Uppsala	8–2	IK Göta
Almkvist (3); Carlsson (2); Månsson (2); Bohlin	Report	Brandius; Arwe

Stockholm Olympic Stadium, Stockholm
Attendance: 3,750
Referee: Ruben Gelbord

IFK Uppsala
(Sweden) Sven Säfwenberg
(Sweden) Seth Howander
(Sweden) Louis Woodzack
(Sweden) Axel Ulfsjöö
(Sweden) Adrian Brolin
(Sweden) Einar Lindqvist
(Sweden) Ruben Carlsson	(1)
(Sweden) Seth Månsson	(2)
(Sweden) Sune Almkvist	(3)
(Sweden) Bertil Bohlin	(2)
(Sweden) Knut Lindvall

IK Göta
(Sweden) Einar Olsson
(Sweden) Erik Burman
(Sweden) Adolf Svedling
(Sweden) Robertsson
(Sweden) Einar Svensson
(Sweden) Ruben Rundqvist
(Sweden) Gustaf Johansson
(Sweden) Gustaf Johansson
(Sweden) Georg Brandius	(1)
(Sweden) Wilhelm Arwe	(1)
(Sweden) Carl-Erik Johansson

== 1920 ==
29 February 1920

IFK Uppsala	3–2	IF Linnéa
Woodzack (2); Almkvist; Bohlin	Report	Eriksson; E. Englund

Stockholm Olympic Stadium, Stockholm
Attendance: 2,211
Referee: Herman Peijel (Uppsala)

IFK Uppsala
(Sweden) Sven Säfwenberg
(Sweden) Seth Howander
(Sweden) Einar Lindqvist
(Sweden) Axel Ulfsjöö
(Sweden) Seth Marell
(Sweden) Adrian Brolin
(Sweden) Ruben Carlsson
(Sweden) Louis Woodzack	(2)
(Sweden) Sune Almkvist
(Sweden) Bertil Bohlin	(1)
(Sweden) Seth Månsson

IF Linnéa
(Sweden) Bengt Nilsson
(Sweden) Helge Andersson
(Sweden) Gustaf Tervin
(Sweden) Nils Tervin
(Sweden) Erik Berg
(Sweden) Isse Andersson
(Sweden) Helge Olsson
(Sweden) David Englund
(Sweden) Erik Julius Eriksson	(1)
(Sweden) Elias Englund	(1)
(Sweden) Nils Lindstam

== 1921 ==
20 February 1921

IK Sirius	2–2	IFK Uppsala
Lundquist (2)	Report	M. Howander (2)

Studenternas IP, Uppsala
Attendance: 3,000
Referee: Ruben Gelbord

IK Sirius
(Sweden) Bie Svanström
(Sweden) Sven Nilsson
(Sweden) Elias Knutsson
(Sweden) Rudolf Berglin
(Sweden) Josua Höglund
(Sweden) Gustaf Bard
(Sweden) Erik Lindskoog
(Sweden) Artur Lundquist	(2)
(Sweden) Ivar Svanström
(Sweden) Ruben Knutsson
(Sweden) Harry Eriksson

IFK Uppsala
(Sweden) Sven Säfwenberg
(Sweden) Louis Woodzack
(Sweden) Einar Lindqvist
(Sweden) Axel Ulfsjöö
(Sweden) Adrian Brolin
(Sweden) Schervik
(Sweden) Ruben Carlsson
(Sweden) Seth Månsson
(Sweden) Seth Howander
(Sweden) Martin Howander	(2)
(Sweden) Bertil Bohlin
(Sweden) Erik Howander

6 March 1921
Replay

IK Sirius	5–2	IFK Uppsala
Lundquist (3); I. Svanström (2)	Report	Månsson; Bohlin

Stockholm Olympic Stadium, Stockholm
Attendance: 3,478
Referee: Ruben Gelbord

IK Sirius
(Sweden) Bie Svanström
(Sweden) Sven Nilsson
(Sweden) Elias Knutsson
(Sweden) Rudolf Berglin
(Sweden) Josua Höglund
(Sweden) Gustaf Bard
(Sweden) Erik Lindskoog
(Sweden) Artur Lundquist	(3)
(Sweden) Ivar Svanström	(2)
(Sweden) Ruben Knutsson
(Sweden) Harry Eriksson

IFK Uppsala
(Sweden) Sven Säfwenberg
(Sweden) Louis Woodzack
(Sweden) Einar Lindqvist
(Sweden) Axel Ulfsjöö
(Sweden) Adrian Brolin
(Sweden) Schervik
(Sweden) Ruben Carlsson
(Sweden) Seth Månsson	(1)
(Sweden) Martin Howander
(Sweden) Bertil Bohlin	(1)
(Sweden) Erik Howander

== 1922 ==
19 February 1922

IK Sirius	3–2	Västerås SK
Lundquist; I. Svanström; R. Knutsson	Report	Hedin; B. Reuter

Stockholm Olympic Stadium, Stockholm
Attendance: 6,909
Referee: K. Lundstedt

IK Sirius
(Sweden) Bie Svanström
(Sweden) Sven Nilsson
(Sweden) Elias Knutsson
(Sweden) Rudolf Berglin
(Sweden) Josua Höglund
(Sweden) Gustaf Bard
(Sweden) Erik Lindskoog
(Sweden) Artur Lundquist	(1)
(Sweden) Ivar Svanström	(1)
(Sweden) Ruben Knutsson	(1)
(Sweden) Harry Eriksson

Västerås SK
(Sweden) Karl Ryman
(Sweden) Oskar Fröjd
(Sweden) Georg Jonsson
(Sweden) Erik Reuter
(Sweden) Hjalmar Bergkvist
(Sweden) Artur Tunell
(Sweden) Fridolf Ryman
(Sweden) Hjalmar Thyberg
(Sweden) David Hedin	(1)
(Sweden) Manne Johansson
(Sweden) Bertil Reuter	(1)

== 1923 ==
25 February 1923

Västerås SK	2–1	IF Linnéa
Rylander; Eriksson	Report	D. Englund

Stockholm Olympic Stadium, Stockholm
Attendance: 3,036
Referee: Erik W. Gustafsson

Västerås SK
(Sweden) Folke Johansson
(Sweden) Oskar Fröjd
(Sweden) Georg Jonsson
(Sweden) Erik Karlsson
(Sweden) Hjalmar Bergkvist
(Sweden) Erik Reuter
(Sweden) Fridolf Ryman
(Sweden) Algot Rylander	(1)
(Sweden) Bernt Eriksson	(1)
(Sweden) Manne Johansson
(Sweden) Bertil Reuter

IF Linnéa
(Sweden) Bengt Nilsson
(Sweden) Helge Andersson
(Sweden) Gustav Tervin
(Sweden) Nils Tervin
(Sweden) Erik Berg
(Sweden) Isse Andersson
(Sweden) David Englund	(1)
(Sweden) Eric Sköld
(Sweden) Erik Julius Eriksson
(Sweden) Elias Englund
(Sweden) Sten Nilsson

== 1924 ==
17 February 1924

Västerås SK	4–1	IF Linnéa
Thunell (2); Eriksson; M. Johansson	Report	Sköld

Stockholm Olympic Stadium, Stockholm
Attendance: 6,780
Referee: Lundgren

Västerås SK
(Sweden) Folke Johansson
(Sweden) Oskar Fröjd
(Sweden) Georg Jonsson
(Sweden) Erik Karlsson
(Sweden) Hjalmar Bergkvist
(Sweden) Erik Reuter
(Sweden) Artur Thunell	(2)
(Sweden) Hilding Johansson
(Sweden) Bernt Eriksson	(1)
(Sweden) Manne Johansson	(1)
(Sweden) Bertil Reuter

IF Linnéa
(Sweden) Bengt Nilsson
(Sweden) Helge Andersson
(Sweden) Torsten Arnberg
(Sweden) Nils Tervin
(Sweden) Erik Berg
(Sweden) Isse Andersson
(Sweden) David Englund
(Sweden) Eric Sköld	(1)
(Sweden) Kurt Bergström
(Sweden) Elias Englund
(Sweden) Erik Julius Eriksson

== 1925 ==
22 February 1925

IK Göta	7–5	Västerås SK
Wejdeby (3); Holmqvist (3); F. Johansson	Report	Karlsson; Linderström; Eriksson; M. Johansson; B. Reuter

Stockholm Olympic Stadium, Stockholm
Attendance: 9,060
Referee: Axel Bergqvist (Stockholm)

IK Göta
(Sweden) Nils Mattsson
(Sweden) Einar Lundell
(Sweden) Einar Svensson
(Sweden) Gustaf Johansson
(Sweden) Åke Nyberg
(Sweden) Ruben Rundqvist
(Sweden) Fritte Johansson	(1)
(Sweden) Birger Wejdeby	(3)
(Sweden) Gunnar Galin
(Sweden) Birger Holmqvist	(3)
(Sweden) Georg Brandius

Västerås SK
(Sweden) Erik Flodell
(Sweden) Georg Jonsson
(Sweden) Oskar Fröjd
(Sweden) Erik Karlsson	(1)
(Sweden) Melker Linderström	(1)
(Sweden) Erik Reuter
(Sweden) Artur Thunell
(Sweden) Hilding Johansson
(Sweden) Bernt Eriksson	(1)
(Sweden) Manne Johansson	(1)
(Sweden) Bertil Reuter	(1)

== 1926 ==
21 February 1926

Västerås SK	1–0	IK Sirius
M. Johansson	Report

Stockholm Olympic Stadium, Stockholm
Attendance: 6,532
Referee: K. Lundstedt

Västerås SK
(Sweden) Folke Johansson
(Sweden) Erik Karlsson
(Sweden) Georg Jonsson
(Sweden) Göte Andersson
(Sweden) Melker Linderström
(Sweden) Erik Reuter
(Sweden) Artur Thunell
(Sweden) Hilding Johansson
(Sweden) Bernt Eriksson
(Sweden) Manne Johansson	(1)
(Sweden) Bertil Reuter

IK Sirius
(Sweden) Manne Lindberg
(Sweden) Sven Nilsson
(Sweden) Elias Knutsson
(Sweden) Elias Karlsson
(Sweden) Ivar Svanström
(Sweden) Gustaf Bard
(Sweden) Martin Nylund
(Sweden) Stig Claesson
(Sweden) Ruben Knutsson
(Sweden) Haldor Svensson
(Sweden) Harry Eriksson

== 1927 ==
27 February 1927

IK Göta	5–1	Västerås SK
Lindeberg (2); Wejdeby; Holmqvist; Brandius	Report	Sand

Stockholm Olympic Stadium, Stockholm
Attendance: 8,856
Referee: Gösta Schelin

IK Göta
(Sweden) Nils Mattsson
(Sweden) Einar Lundell
(Sweden) Einar Svensson
(Sweden) Bo Lindeberg	(2)
(Sweden) Åke Nyberg
(Sweden) Ruben Rundqvist
(Sweden) Eric Sköld
(Sweden) Birger Wejdeby	(1)
(Sweden) Gunnar Galin
(Sweden) Birger Holmqvist	(1)
(Sweden) Georg Brandius	(1)

Västerås SK
(Sweden) Folke Johansson
(Sweden) Erik Karlsson
(Sweden) Georg Jonsson
(Sweden) Göte Andersson
(Sweden) Melker Linderström
(Sweden) Gunnar Hyttse
(Sweden) Bernt Eriksson
(Sweden) Hilding Johansson
(Sweden) Stig Sand	(1)
(Sweden) Manne Johansson
(Sweden) Bertil Reuter

== 1928 ==
19 February 1928

IK Göta	5–3	IK Sirius
Nyberg; Johansson; Wejdeby; Brandius; Engberg	Report	Svensson (2); Claesson

Stockholm Olympic Stadium, Stockholm
Attendance: 6,382
Referee: H. Jacobsson

IK Göta
(Sweden) Nils Mattsson
(Sweden) Einar Lundell
(Sweden) Einar Svensson
(Sweden) Hugo Söderström
(Sweden) Åke Nyberg	(1)
(Sweden) Ruben Rundqvist
(Sweden) Fritte Johansson	(1)
(Sweden) Birger Wejdeby	(1)
(Sweden) Gunnar Galin
(Sweden) Georg Brandius	(1)
(Sweden) Holger Engberg	(1)

IK Sirius
(Sweden) Gustav Reuterschöld
(Sweden) Reinhold Lindberg
(Sweden) Ragnar Lindberg
(Sweden) Elias Karlsson
(Sweden) Ivar Svanström
(Sweden) Gustaf Bard
(Sweden) Eric Lindskoog
(Sweden) Thorvald Lindberg
(Sweden) Stig Claesson	(1)
(Sweden) Haldor Svensson	(2)
(Sweden) Wännström

== 1929 ==
24 February 1929

IK Göta	5–1	Västerås SK
Wejdeby (2); Engberg (2); Burman	Report	Hyttse

Stockholm Olympic Stadium, Stockholm
Attendance: 5,787
Referee: Artur Björklund

IK Göta
(Sweden) Nils Mattsson
(Sweden) Einar Lundell
(Sweden) Einar Svensson
(Sweden) Hugo Söderström
(Sweden) Åke Nyberg
(Sweden) Gustaf Johansson
(Sweden) Erik Burman	(1)
(Sweden) Birger Wejdeby	(2)
(Sweden) Gunnar Galin
(Sweden) Holger Engberg	(2)
(Sweden) Georg Brandius

Västerås SK
(Sweden) Thor Karlsson
(Sweden) Melker Linderström
(Sweden) Georg Jonsson
(Sweden) Erik Karlsson
(Sweden) Göte Andersson
(Sweden) Gunnar Hyttse	(1)
(Sweden) Bernt Eriksson
(Sweden) Arne Lindholm
(Sweden) Helge Olsson
(Sweden) Manne Johansson
(Sweden) Gustav Andersson

== 1930 ==
In 1930, SK Tirfing made their first appearance and advanced to the final by beating IF Mode in the round of 16 (8–4), IFK Rättvik in the quarter-finals (4–2), and Nacka SK in the semi-finals (4–1).

2 March 1930

SK Tirfing	1–0	Djurgårdens IF
Magnusson	Report

Stockholm Olympic Stadium, Stockholm
Attendance: 3,559
Referee: Gösta Schelin

SK Tirfing
(Sweden) Fingal Lager
(Sweden) Ture Jonsson
(Sweden) Emil Holmgren
(Sweden) Birger Lindblad
(Sweden) Martin Pettersson
(Sweden) Sixten Jonsson
(Sweden) Sixten Larsson
(Sweden) Sixten Bohlund
(Sweden) Gunnar Kock
(Sweden) Arne Magnusson	(1)
(Sweden) Svante Strandkvist

Djurgårdens IF
(Sweden) Nils Johansson
(Sweden) Folke Ahrsjö
(Sweden) Fred Skoglund
(Sweden) Sigge Johansson
(Sweden) Gösta Rosell
(Sweden) Erik Lindgren
(Sweden) Ivar Gate
(Sweden) Sigge Kungberg
(Sweden) Walter Söderman
(Sweden) Hugo Grönkvist
(Sweden) Kurt Heuman

== 1931 ==
1 March 1931

AIK	4–3	IF Göta
C. Haglund; Petersén; Roth; K. Johansson	Report	Borgström; Widing; E. Karlström

Stockholm Olympic Stadium, Stockholm
Attendance: 9,213
Referee: Axel Bergqvist (Stockholm)

AIK
(Sweden) Sven Andersson
(Sweden) Otto Lindström
(Sweden) Jan-Erik Olsson-Garland
(Sweden) Olov Johansson
(Sweden) Algot Haglund
(Sweden) Curt Haglund	(1)
(Sweden) John Nilsson
(Sweden) Wilhelm Petersén	(1)
(Sweden) Per Kaufeldt
(Sweden) Erik Roth	(1)
(Sweden) Knut Johansson	(1)

IF Göta
(Sweden) Erik Jonasson
(Sweden) Axel Sandell
(Sweden) John Lerin
(Sweden) Gösta Pettersson
(Sweden) Bernhard Larsson-Lörner
(Sweden) Russel Pettersson
(Sweden) Uno Samuelsson
(Sweden) Eric Borgström	(1)
(Sweden) Henry Widing	(1)
(Sweden) Erik Karlström	(1)
(Sweden) Karl Karlström

== 1932 ==
6 March 1932

IF Göta	3–2	Västerås SK
Larsson; K. Karlström; Alfredsson	Report	Thelin; Andersson-Angtén

Stockholm Olympic Stadium, Stockholm
Attendance: 8,454
Referee: Sven Klang (Stockholm)

IF Göta
(Sweden) Erik Jonasson
(Sweden) Axel Sandell
(Sweden) John Lerin
(Sweden) Gösta Pettersson
(Sweden) Bernhard Lörner
(Sweden) Russel Pettersson
(Sweden) Bengt Larsson	(1)
(Sweden) Erik Karlström
(Sweden) Henry Widing
(Sweden) Karl Karlström	(1)
(Sweden) Alf Alfredsson	(1)

Västerås SK
(Sweden) Thor Karlsson
(Sweden) Uno Karlsson
(Sweden) Georg Jonsson
(Sweden) Melker Linderström
(Sweden) Bernt Hellström
(Sweden) Arne Lindholm
(Sweden) Helge Olsson
(Sweden) Gunnar Hyttse
(Sweden) Hadar Thelin	(1)
(Sweden) Helge Haeffner
(Sweden) Harry Andersson-Angtén	(1)

== 1933 ==
26 February 1933

IFK Uppsala	11–1	IF Göta
Carlberg (5); Öberg (5); Ask	Report

Stockholm Olympic Stadium, Stockholm
Attendance: 9,307
Referee: Elias Englund

IFK Uppsala
(Sweden) Sven Säfwenberg
(Sweden) Nils Werner
(Sweden) Erik Ahlström
(Sweden) Folke Gustavsson
(Sweden) Bengt Nordenman
(Sweden) Evert Åslund
(Sweden) Harry Säfwenberg
(Sweden) Roland Carlberg	(5)
(Sweden) Ejnar Ask	(1)
(Sweden) Sven Söderström
(Sweden) Bror Öberg	(5)

IF Göta
(Sweden) Erik Jonasson
(Sweden) Axel Sandell
(Sweden) John Lerin
(Sweden) Gösta Pettersson
(Sweden) Bernhard Lörner
(Sweden) Russel Pettersson
(Sweden) Bengt Larsson
(Sweden) Henry Widing
(Sweden) Alf Alfredsson
(Sweden) Erik Karlström
(Sweden) Karl Karlström

== 1934 ==
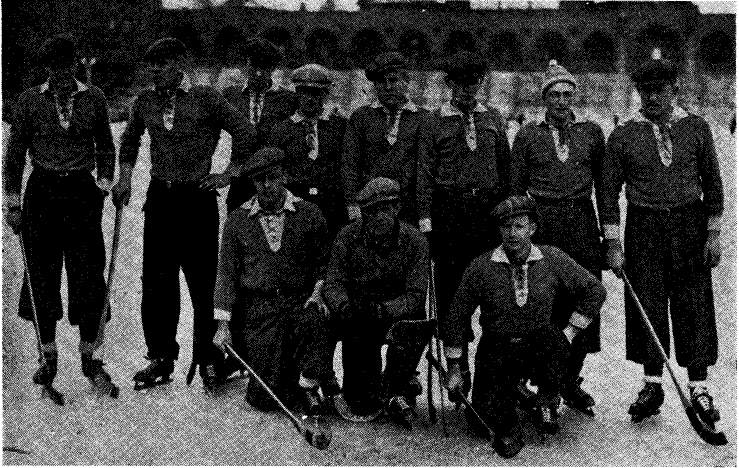
Slottsbrons IF team at the 1934 final replay at Sandbäckstjärnet in Karlstad.

4 March 1934

Slottsbrons IF	1–1	IFK Uppsala
Hjalmar Klarqvist	Report	Nordenman

Stockholm Olympic Stadium, Stockholm
Attendance: 10,748
Referee: Ivan Eklind (Stockholm)

Slottsbrons IF
(Sweden) Kurt Nilsson
(Sweden) Thore Magnusson
(Sweden) Folke Swärdh
(Sweden) Arne Knöös
(Sweden) Carl Funke
(Sweden) Ragnar Nilsson
(Sweden) Göran Funke
(Sweden) Harald Törnqvist
(Sweden) Henry Klarqvist
(Sweden) Hjalmar Klarqvist	(1)
(Sweden) Gunnar Stridsberg

IFK Uppsala
(Sweden) Sven Säfwenberg
(Sweden) Nils Werner
(Sweden) Erik Ahlström
(Sweden) Folke Gustafsson
(Sweden) Bengt Nordenman	(1)
(Sweden) Evert Åslund
(Sweden) Ture Gudmundsson
(Sweden) Roland Carlberg
(Sweden) Ejnar Ask
(Sweden) Sven Söderström
(Sweden) Bror Öberg

11 March 1934
Replay

Slottsbrons IF	6–0	IFK Uppsala
Hjalmar Klarqvist (2); Gunnar Stridsberg (2); R. Nilsson; Törnqvist	Report

Sandbäckstjärnet, Karlstad
Attendance: 8,660
Referee: Erik Karlsson (Västerås)

Slottsbrons IF
(Sweden) Kurt Nilsson
(Sweden) Thore Magnusson
(Sweden) Folke Swärdh
(Sweden) Arne Knöös
(Sweden) Carl Funke
(Sweden) Ragnar Nilsson	(1)
(Sweden) Göran Funke
(Sweden) Harald Törnqvist	(1)
(Sweden) Henry Klarqvist
(Sweden) Hjalmar Klarqvist	(2)
(Sweden) Gunnar Stridsberg	(2)

IFK Uppsala
(Sweden) Sven Säfwenberg
(Sweden) Nils Werner
(Sweden) Erik Ahlström
(Sweden) Folke Gustafsson
(Sweden) Bengt Nordenman
(Sweden) Evert Åslund
(Sweden) Ture Gudmundsson
(Sweden) Roland Carlberg
(Sweden) Ejnar Ask
(Sweden) Sven Söderström
(Sweden) Bror Öberg

== 1935 ==
3 March 1935

IF Göta	5–2	Västerås SK
Alfredsson (2); Larsson; Karlström; Widing	Report	Hyttse; Bergström

Tingvalla Isstadion, Karlstad
Attendance: 6,705
Referee: Ragnar Bäckström (Stockholm)

IF Göta
(Sweden) Erik Jonasson
(Sweden) Gunnar Jonasson
(Sweden) Gösta Löwgren
(Sweden) Viktor Eriksson
(Sweden) Göran Sundström
(Sweden) Roger Carlsson
(Sweden) Bengt Larsson	(1)
(Sweden) Erik Karlström	(1)
(Sweden) Russel Pettersson
(Sweden) Alf Alfredsson	(2)
(Sweden) Henry Widing	(1)

Västerås SK
(Sweden) Thor Karlsson
(Sweden) Bernt Hellström
(Sweden) Tage Dahlborg
(Sweden) Birger Hammarbäck
(Sweden) Folke Lindblom
(Sweden) Arne Lindholm
(Sweden) Knut Karlsson
(Sweden) Harry Thelin
(Sweden) Harry Andersson-Angtén
(Sweden) Gunnar Hyttse	(1)
(Sweden) Einar Bergström	(1)

== 1936 ==
1 March 1936

Slottsbrons IF	2–1	Västerås SK
Törnqvist (2)	Report	Sundqvist

Stockholm Olympic Stadium, Stockholm
Attendance: 11,700
Referee: Ivan Eklind (Stockholm)

Slottsbrons IF
(Sweden) Kurt Nilsson
(Sweden) Tage Knöös
(Sweden) Folke Swärdh
(Sweden) Thore Magnusson
(Sweden) Carl Funke
(Sweden) Ragnar Nilsson
(Sweden) Henry Klarqvist
(Sweden) Harald Törnqvist	(2)
(Sweden) Göran Funke
(Sweden) Hjalmar Klarqvist
(Sweden) Nils Andersson
(Sweden) Tage Karlsson

Västerås SK
(Sweden) Gunnar Robsahm
(Sweden) Erik Eklund
(Sweden) Bernt Hellström
(Sweden) Harry Angtén
(Sweden) Folke Lindblom
(Sweden) Birger Hammarbäck
(Sweden) Knut Karlsson
(Sweden) Holger Sundqvist	(1)
(Sweden) Gösta Grandell
(Sweden) Gunnar Hyttse
(Sweden) Einar Bergström

== 1937 ==
21 February 1937

IF Göta	3–2	Skutskärs IF
Carlsson (3)	Report	Magnusson; Strand

Stockholm Olympic Stadium, Stockholm
Attendance: 10,959
Referee: Ivan Eklind (Stockholm)

IF Göta
(Sweden) Erik Jonasson
(Sweden) Gunnar Jonasson
(Sweden) Gösta Löwgren
(Sweden) Viktor Eriksson
(Sweden) Göran Sundström
(Sweden) Herman Jonasson
(Sweden) Roger Carlsson	(3)
(Sweden) Erik Karlström
(Sweden) Russel Pettersson
(Sweden) Bengt Larsson
(Sweden) Alf Alfredsson

Skutskärs IF
(Sweden) Martin Andersson
(Sweden) Emritz Lindberg
(Sweden) Ture Sjöberg
(Sweden) Gunnar Elfström
(Sweden) Bertil Ahlström
(Sweden) Sven Söderlund
(Sweden) Edvard Andersson
(Sweden) Henry Muhrén
(Sweden) Åke Larsson
(Sweden) Arne Magnusson	(1)
(Sweden) Sixten Strand	(1)

== 1938 ==
13 February 1938

Slottsbrons IF	5–2	IFK Rättvik
Hjalmar Klarqvist (3); Törnqvist	Report	Jacobsson; Kallur Erik Eriksson

Stockholm Olympic Stadium, Stockholm
Attendance: 15,186
Referee: Ivan Eklind (Stockholm)

Slottsbrons IF
(Sweden) Hugo Blom
(Sweden) Arne Knöös
(Sweden) Tage Knöös
(Sweden) Thore Magnusson
(Sweden) Carl Funke
(Sweden) Ragnar Nilsson
(Sweden) Henry Klarqvist
(Sweden) Harald Törnqvist	(1)
(Sweden) Göran Funke
(Sweden) Hjalmar Klarqvist	(3)
(Sweden) Nils Andersson

IFK Rättvik
(Sweden) Kallur Einar Eriksson
(Sweden) John Nylén
(Sweden) Gösta Blomqvist
(Sweden) Kallur Sven Hansson
(Sweden) Kallur Erik Hansson
(Sweden) Erik Lidell
(Sweden) Åke Jacobsson	(1)
(Sweden) Einar Tätting
(Sweden) Jöns Erik Eriksson
(Sweden) Kallur Erik Eriksson	(1)
(Sweden) Elis Lidell

== 1939 ==
5 March 1939

IK Huge	5–2	Nässjö IF
Lindqvist (3); Sundqvist (2)	Report	Bergström (2)

Strömvallen, Gävle
Attendance: 5,560
Referee: Stig Claesson (Uppsala)

IK Huge
(Sweden) Sture Nyberg
(Sweden) Sven Persson
(Sweden) Gösta Wennberg
(Sweden) Gottfrid Wennberg
(Sweden) Bengt Eriksson
(Sweden) Sven Abrahamsson
(Sweden) Bengt Hagström
(Sweden) Leif Lindqvist	(3)
(Sweden) Thure Siljeholm
(Sweden) Göte Sundqvist	(2)
(Sweden) Åke Abrahamsson

Nässjö IF
(Sweden) John Larsson-Laurelii
(Sweden) Elmer Wilhelmsson
(Sweden) Åke Igesten
(Sweden) Tage Engberg
(Sweden) Curt Lager
(Sweden) Arne Carlsson
(Sweden) Nils Bergström	(2)
(Sweden) Göte Thinnberger
(Sweden) Birger Holmer
(Sweden) Harald Jonsson
(Sweden) Gösta Svensson

== 1940 ==
1940

IK Huge	2–1	Sandvikens AIK
	Report

Stockholm Olympic Stadium, Stockholm
Attendance: 9,263

== 1941 ==
1941

Slottsbrons IF	2–1	Sandvikens AIK
	Report

Stockholm Olympic Stadium, Stockholm
Attendance: 10,543

== 1942 ==
1942

Västerås SK	2–1	Skutskärs IF
	Report

Stockholm Olympic Stadium, Stockholm
Attendance: 12,530

== 1943 ==
1943

Västerås SK	2–2	Bollnäs GIF
	Report

Stockholm Olympic Stadium, Stockholm
Attendance: 15,769
1943
Replay

Västerås SK	3–0	Bollnäs GIF
	Report

Laduviken, Stockholm
Attendance: 6,392

== 1944 ==
1944

Skutskärs IF	2–0	Västerås SK
	Report

Stockholm Olympic Stadium, Stockholm
Attendance: 20,770

== 1945 ==
1945

Sandvikens AIK	3–2 (a.e.t.)	Slottsbrons IF
	Report

Stockholm Olympic Stadium, Stockholm
Attendance: 18,969

== 1946 ==
1946

Sandvikens AIK	0–0	Västerås SK
	Report

Stockholm Olympic Stadium, Stockholm
Attendance: 22,144
1946
Replay

Sandvikens AIK	5–3	Västerås SK
	Report

Stockholm Olympic Stadium, Stockholm
Attendance: 20,598

== 1947 ==
1947

Brobergs IF	4–2	Västerås SK
	Report

Stockholm Olympic Stadium, Stockholm
Attendance: 24,421

== 1948 ==
1948

Västerås SK	4–1	Brobergs IF
	Report

Stockholm Olympic Stadium, Stockholm
Attendance: 26,617

== 1949 ==
1949

Nässjö IF	7–1	Edsbyns IF
	Report

Perstorpsgölen, Eksjö
Attendance: 14,809

== See also ==
- List of Swedish bandy championship finals (1950–1999)
- List of Swedish bandy championship finals (2000–)
