= List of bandy players awarded Stora Grabbars och Tjejers Märke =

Stora grabbars och tjejers märke (lit. Big Boys' and Girls' Badge) is an honorary award within Swedish sports, created in 1928 by Bo Ekelund. The recipients are called a 'Stor Grabb' (lit. Big Boy) and has to gather a certain number of points according to different rules depending on the sport in question. The title is awarded in several different sports, such as ice hockey, football, athletics, free diving, miniature golf, and others. Since 1989, women can also gain the title, then called Stora tjejers märke (lit. Big Girls' Badge), and the recipient is called a 'Stor tjej' (lit. Big Girl).

== Recipients ==
=== Men ===
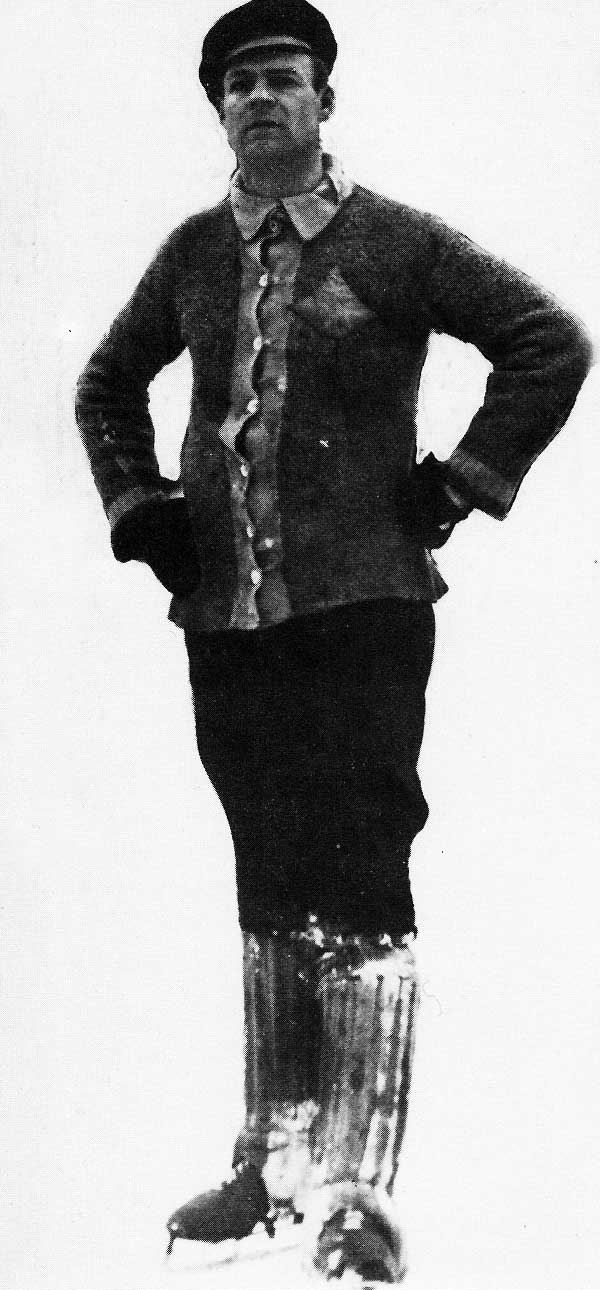
Sven Säfwenberg was awarded Stor grabb number 1.

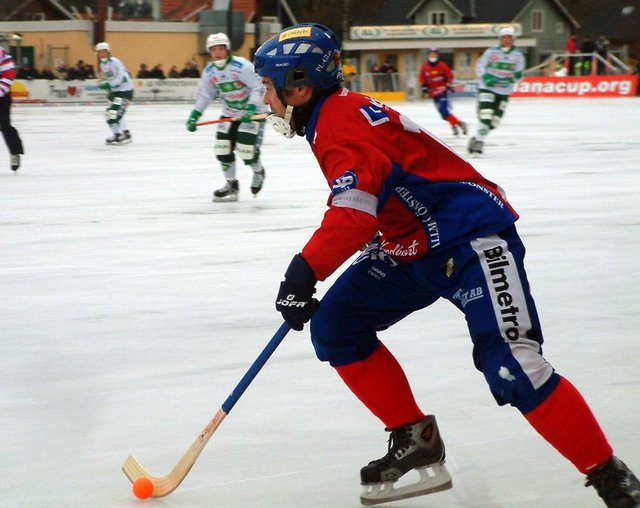
Magnus Olsson was awarded Stor grabb number 228.

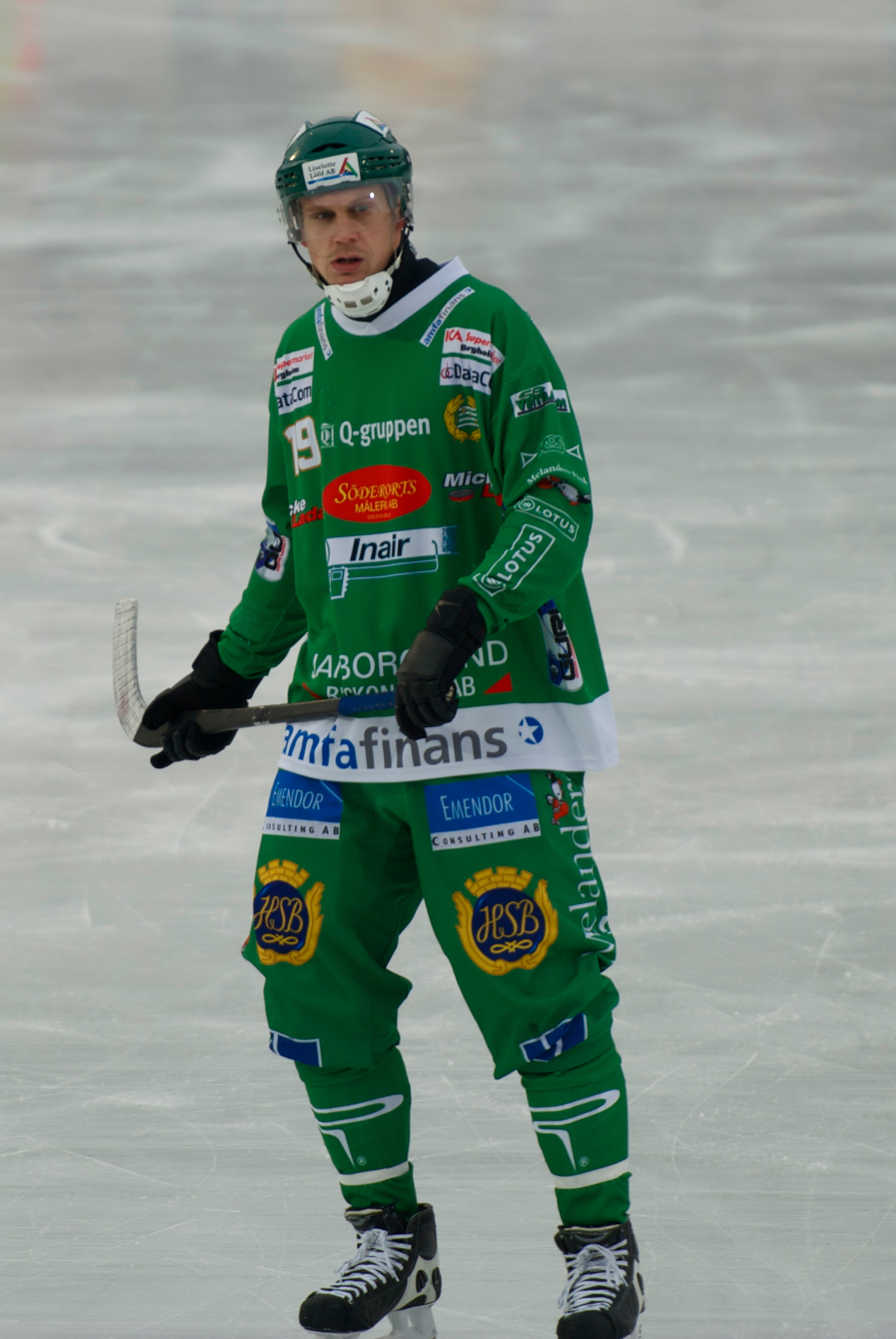
Patrik Nilsson was awarded Stor grabb number 235.

As of 26 January 2018

No	Player	Year	Club(s)
0	Sune Almkvist		IFK Uppsala
1	Sven Säfwenberg		IFK Uppsala
2	Gunnar Galin		IK Göta, AIK
3	Gunnar Hyttse		Västerås
4	Åke Nyberg		IK Göta, AIK
5	Gustaf Bard		Sirius
6	Birger Wejdeby		IFK Uppsala
7	Einar Lindqvist		IFK Uppsala
8	Algot Haglund		Djurgården, AIK
9	Manne Johansson		Västerås
10	Henry Klarqvist		IK Göta, Slottsbron
11	Reinhold Lindberg		Sirius, Vesta, IFK Uppsala
12	Martin Howander		IFK Uppsala
13	Georg Johnsson		Västerås
14	Ejnar Ask		IFK Uppsala, Sandviken
15	Sigge Öberg		Hammarby
16	John Laurelli		Nässjö
17	Hjalmar Klarkvist		Slottsbron, Bollnäs
18	Emritz Lindberg		Skutskär
19	Erik Jonasson		IF Göta
20	Gunnar Jonasson		IF Göta, Edsbyn
21	Gösta Löwgren		IF Göta
22	Kallur Erik Hansson		IFK Rättvik
23	Erik Eklund		Västerås
24	Bernt Hellström		Västerås
25	Sixten Jansson		Vesta, IFK Uppsala
26	Bengt Larsson		IF Göta
27	Arne Magnusson		Tirfing, Skutskär
28	Ragnar Nilsson		Slottsbron
29	Hilding Gustavsson		Reymersholm
30	Edvard Andersson		Skutskär
31	Gösta Svensson		Nässjö
32	Herman Jonasson		IF Göta, Edsbyn
33	Nils Bergström		Nässjö
34	Bertil Reuter		Västerås
35	Henry Murén		Skutskär
36	Einar Tätting		IFK Rättvik
37	Ture Vallo		Skutskär, Västerås
38	Bo Nilsson		Skutskär, Sandviken
39	Ingvar Wasberg		Broberg
40	Rune Myhr		Broberg
41	Gustaf Danielsson		Broberg
42	Pontus Widén		Västerås
43	Tage Sjöstrand		Västerås
44	Erik Flodberg		Broberg
45	Leif Lindqvist		IK Huge
46	Åke Igesten		Nässjö
47	Folke Olsson		Broberg
48	Herbert Swartswe		Edsbyn
49	Elof Johansson		Broberg
50	Evert Nilsson		Slottsbron
51	Åke Andersson		Hammarby
52	Gunnar Zackrisson		Sandviken
53	Alf Alfredsson		IF Göta
54	Ragnar Lindberg		Sirius
55	Nils Andersson		Slottsbron
56	Einar Bergström		Västerås
57	Bertil Bohlin		IFK Uppsala
58	Adrian Brohlin		IFK Uppsala
59	Harry Ericsson		Sirius
60	Karl Funke		Slottsbron
61	Arne Hansson		Skutskär
62	Birger Holmqvist		IK Göta
63	Seth Howander		IFK Uppsala
64	Georg Johansson		IK Göta
65	Erik Karlsson		Västerås
66	Ruben Carlsson		IFK Uppsala
67	Göte Karlström		Västerås
68	Bernhard Larsson		IF Göta
69	Seth Månsson		IFK Uppsala
70	Sven Nilsson		Sirius
71	Henry Ohlsson		Västerås
72	Russel Pettersson		IF Göta
73	Eric Sköld		IF Linnéa
74	Ivar Svanström		Sirius
75	Hugo Söderström		IK Göta
76	Harald Törnquist		Slottsbron
77	Henry Widing		IF Göta
78	Louis Woodzack		IFK Uppsala
79	Erik Flodin		Västerås
80	Åke Mickelsson		Bollnäs
81	Nils Hellström		Sandviken
82	Hans Pettersson		Slottsbron
83	Olle Sääw		Örebro
84	Martin Johansson		Bollnäs
85	Karl-Erik Sjöberg		Bollnäs
86	Ernst Hård		Forsbacka
87	Orvar Bergmark		Örebro, AIK
88	Yngve Palmqvist		Hammarby, Sirius
89	Tage Magnusson		Örebro
90	Tore Olsson		IFK Rättvik, IF Göta
91	Olle Lindgren		Bollnäs, AIK
92	Jonny Lerin		IF Göta
93	Rune Pettersson		Sandviken
94	Uno Wennerholm		Nässjö, IF Göta, Tranås
95	Sven Bergström		Örebro
96	Elis Johansson		Edsbyn
97	Paul Karlsson		Edsbyn
98	Sven-Erik Broberg		Västanfors, IF Göta, Västerås
99	Agard Magnusson		Sandviken
100	Inge Cahlman		Skutskär
101	Sven-Åke Svensson		Slottsbron
102	Roy Berglöf		IF Göta
103	Ove Eidhagen		Örebro, Sirius
104	Sten Carlsson		Örebro, Nässjö
105	Sven Olof Landar		Edsbyn
106	Sture Strand		Skutskär
107	Karl-Erik Södergren		Örebro
108	Tore Wikner		AIK, Sirius
109	Torvald Åkerlöf		Forsbacka
110	Gunnar Jansson		Västerås
111	Gösta Kihlgård		Örebro
112	Nils Wikman		Lesjöfors
113	Sven-Åke Erixon		Örebro, Sirius
114	Allan Arvidsson		Edsbyn
115	Rune Sääf		Västanfors
116	Gudmund Jernberg		Edsbyn
117	Jörgen Forslund		Edsbyn
118	Leif Fredblad		Hammarby
119	Ulf Fredin		Sirius
120	Sigge Parling		Sirius, Forsbacka
121	Lennart Backman		Katrineholm, AIK
122	Curt Sedvall		Broberg
123	Roland Niva		Katrineholm
124	Jens Lindblom		Hammarby, Ljusdal
125	Kjell Jacobsson		Västanfors, AIK
126	Lennart Ståhlberg		Edsbyn
127	Kurt Nyberg		Edsbyn
128	Göran Sedvall		Falun, Mjölby, Broberg
129	Åke Jansson		Katrineholm
130	Jan Johansson		Nässjö
131	Rolf Jonsson		Edsbyn
132	Sune Ericsson		IF Göta
133	Gunnar Palmér		Ljusdal
134	Gunnar Ring		Örebro
135	Hans Nordin		Örebro
136	Bernt Ericsson		Falun, Boltic
137	Leif Sveder		IF Göta
138	Matz Allan Johansson		Vesta, Sandviken, Sirius
139	Ove Almroth		Västerås
140	Carl-Erik Askelöf		Falun, Sirius, Hammarby, Söderfors
141	Jan Hermanson		Nässjö
142	Örjan Modin		Ljusdal
143	Jan Eric Flink		Broberg, Bollnäs, Sandviken
144	Börje Andersson		Hammarby
145	Håkan Persson		Sirius, Lesjöfors
146	Bernt Örhn		Sandviken
147	Benny Lennartsson		Örebro
148	Sören Andersson		Örebro
149	Håkan Spångberg		Västerås, Hälleforsnäs
150	Torsten Sparv		Tranås BoIS
151	Leif Wasberg		Edsbyn, Broberg
152	Lage Nordén		Ljusdal, Bollnäs
153	Hans Carpman		Katrineholm
154	Torbjörn Ek		Ljusdal, Västerås, IFK Kungälv
155	Håkan Sundin		Sirius, Broberg, Edsbyn, IFK Stockholm
156	Bengt Eriksson		Bollnäs, Ljusdal, IFK Vänersborg
157	Håkan Ohlsson		Katrineholm, Värmbol, IFK Vänersborg
158	Per Jagbrant		Köping, Värmbol
159	Kjell Österberg		Katrineholm
160	Tommy Axelsson		Katrineholm
161	Benny Söderling		Hammarby, Essinge
162	Claes-Håkan Asklund		Västerås, Tillberga
163	Jan-Ivar Ekberg		IFK Nora, Örebro
164	Lars-Göran Lindqvist		IFK Kungälv, Nässjö
165	Tommy Nordenek		Kungälvs SK, IFK Kungälv, IFK Vänersborg
166	Jan Eriksson		Falun
167	Lars Olsson		Sandviken
168	Göran Johansson		Villa
169	Sören Boström		Västerås, Västanfors
170	Björn-Olof Forsberg		Västerås, Boltic
171	Håkan Karlsson		Bollnäs, Edsbyn
172	Bengt Ramström		Örebro, Boltic
173	Lars-Ove Sjödin		Örebro, Västerås
174	Jan Berlin		Sirius
175	Stefan Karlsson		Boltic, Vetlanda, Broberg
176	Lars Ångström		Ale/Surte, Boltic
177	Mikael Arvidsson		Villa Lidköping, IFK Motala
178	Ola Johansson		Boltic, Edsbyn, Västerås
179	Per Togner		Boltic, Vetlanda, IF Göta
180	Thomas Fransson		Selånger, Vetlanda, Hälleforsnäs
181	Bengt Carlsson		Boltic
182	Anders Söderholm		Edsbyn, Sandviken
183	Christer Kjellqvist		Villa Lidköping, Sirius
184	Mats Carlsson		Boltic
185	Hans Johansson		Edsbyn, Västerås
186	Joe Lönngren		Edsbyn
187	Anders Bridholm		Villa Lidköping, Boltic
188	Björn Tömmernes		Boltic
189	Kenth Hultqvist		Boltic, Vetlanda
190	Patrick Johansson		Vetlanda, Selånger
191	Per-Olof Petersson		IFK Motala
192	Peter Olsson		Boltic
193	Örjan Gunnarsson		Boltic
194	Per Lennartsson		Vetlanda
195	Kent Edlund		IFK Motala, Vetlanda
196	Stefan Jonsson		Västerås
197	Pelle Fosshaug		IFK Vänersborg, Falun, Västerås
198	Mikael Forsell		Villa Lidköping, Boltic
199	Kjell Kruse		Boltic
200	Kjell Berglund		Boltic
201	Stefan Åkerlind		Sandviken
202	Jonas Claesson		Vetlanda, Hammarby
203	Ola Fredricson		Boltic, Västerås
204	Niclas Johannesson		Boltic
205	Pontus Sundelius		Vetlanda
206	Roger Karlsson		IFK Motala, Västerås
207	Göran Rosendahl		Västerås, Hammarby
208	Hans Åström		Sandviken, Bollnäs
209	Patrik Sandell		Vetlanda, IFK Motala, Hammarby
210	Gert Johansson		Vetlanda
211	Marcus Bergwall		Boltic, Hammarby
212	Jonas Holgersson		Västerås, Hammarby
213	Patrik Södergren		Bollnäs, Boltic, Sandviken
214	Niklas Spångberg		Sandviken
215	Magnus Muhrén		Sandviken
216	Andreas Bergwall		IFK Kungälv, Västerås
217	Michael Carlsson		Västerås
218	Ted Andersson		Västerås
219	Lars Gustafsson		Västerås
220	Henrik Hagberg		Sandviken
221	Anders Östling		Sandviken, Västerås
222	Daniel Kjörling		Sandviken
223	Daniel Eriksson		Sandviken
224	Andreas Eskhult		Hammarby
225	Stefan Erixon		Hammarby
226	Stefan Söderholm		Sandviken
227	Andreas Westh		Sandviken
228	Magnus Olsson		Edsbyn
229	Daniel Liw		Edsbyn
230	Anders Svensson		Edsbyn
231	Anders Bruun		
232	Daniel Välitalo		
233	Daniel Mossberg		
234	David Karlsson		
235	Patrik Nilsson		
236	Johan Esplund		
237	Per Hellmyrs		
238	Olov Englund		
239	Daniel Andersson		
240	Hans Andersson		
241	Daniel Burvall-Jonsson		
242	Jonas Edling		
243	Daniel Berlin		
244	Christoffer Edlund		
245	Linus Pettersson		
246	Erik Säfström		

=== Women ===
As of 30 March 2023

No	Player	Year	Club(s)
1	Anki Andersson		
2	Lena Lundin		
3	Mainy Norling		
4	Gunilla Ekeling		
5	Anna Wall		
6	Lena Larsson		
7	Helena Lundström		
8	Tina Eriksson		
9	Ingela Bergqvist		
10	Eva-Lena Brattén		
11	Lena Krameus		
12	Anna-Karin Olsson		
13	Karin Redelius		
14	Ulrika Fröberg		
15	Marita Säll		
16	Marie Halvarsson		
17	Anette Andersson		
18	Anna Andersson		
19	Eva Palm		
20	Malin Heed		
21	Anna Klingborg		
22	Johanna Pettersson		
23	Emma Kronberg		
24	Anna Jepson		
25	Åsa Boström		
26	Anna Lundin		
27	Mikaela Hasselgren		
28	Petra Lindefors		
29	Linda Odén		
30	Maria Sverin		
31	Johanna Karlsson		
32	Sofia Rådman		
33	Elin Sandgren		
34	Sandra Carlsson		
35	Frida Erlandsson		
36	Kristina Sigfridsson		
37	Sigrid Simonsson		
38	Hanna Dahlström		
39	Lovisa Elovsson		
40	Camilla Johansson		
41	Malin Andersson		
42	Anna Widing		
43	Camilla Andersson		
44	Matilda Svenler		
45	Pernilla Elardt-Östh		

== See also ==
- List of athletes awarded Stora grabbars och tjejers märke
- List of footballers awarded Stora Grabbars och Tjejers Märke
- List of ice hockey players awarded Stora Grabbars och Tjejers Märke
- List of skiers awarded Stora grabbars och tjejers märke
