= List of Swedish bandy champions (players) =

Swedish bandy champions (Swedish: Svenska mästare i bandy) is a title held by the winners of the final of the highest Swedish bandy league played each year, Elitserien.

Sune Almkvist has the most titles, with nine each.

Below is a list of the players awarded medals.

== Players ==
=== A ===
- Erik Andéhn - Djurgården 1908

=== F ===
- Gunnar Friberg - Djurgården 1908
- Ivar Friberg - Djurgården 1908, 1912
- Götrik Frykman - Djurgården 1908, 1912

=== G ===
- Knut Gustafsson - Djurgården 1912

=== J ===
- Gottfrid Johansson - Djurgården 1908, 1912

=== K ===
- Karl-Gunnar Karlsson-Arnö - Djurgården 1912

=== L ===
- Erik Lavass - Djurgården 1908, 1912

=== M ===
- Bror Modén - Djurgården 1908

=== N ===
- Algot Nilsson - Djurgården 1908

=== O ===
- Karl Öhman - Djurgården 1908, 1912

=== S ===
- Jean Söderberg - Djurgården 1912
- Sten Söderberg - Djurgården 1912
- Arvid Spångberg - Djurgården 1908

=== W ===
- Birger Walla - Djurgården 1908
- Folke Wahlgren - Djurgården 1912
- Ragnar Wicksell - Djurgården 1912

== See also ==
- List of Swedish bandy champions
- List of Swedish bandy junior champions
