= Walter Söderman =

Swedish ice hockey player

- Born: 26 November 1904
- Position: F
- Played for: Djurgården; IK Göta
- Playing career: 1923–1935

Walter Söderman (born 26 November 1904, date of death unknown) was a Swedish ice hockey forward and bandy player.

As an ice hockey player, Söderman played for Djurgårdens IF Hockey 1923–34 and was part of the Djurgården Swedish champions' team of 1926. In 1934–35, he played for IK Göta.

As a bandy player, he played with Djurgårdens IF Bandy 1930–32. He played the 1930 Swedish championship final against SK Tirfing, which his team lost 0–1.
