= Sven Säfwenberg =

Swedish bandy player

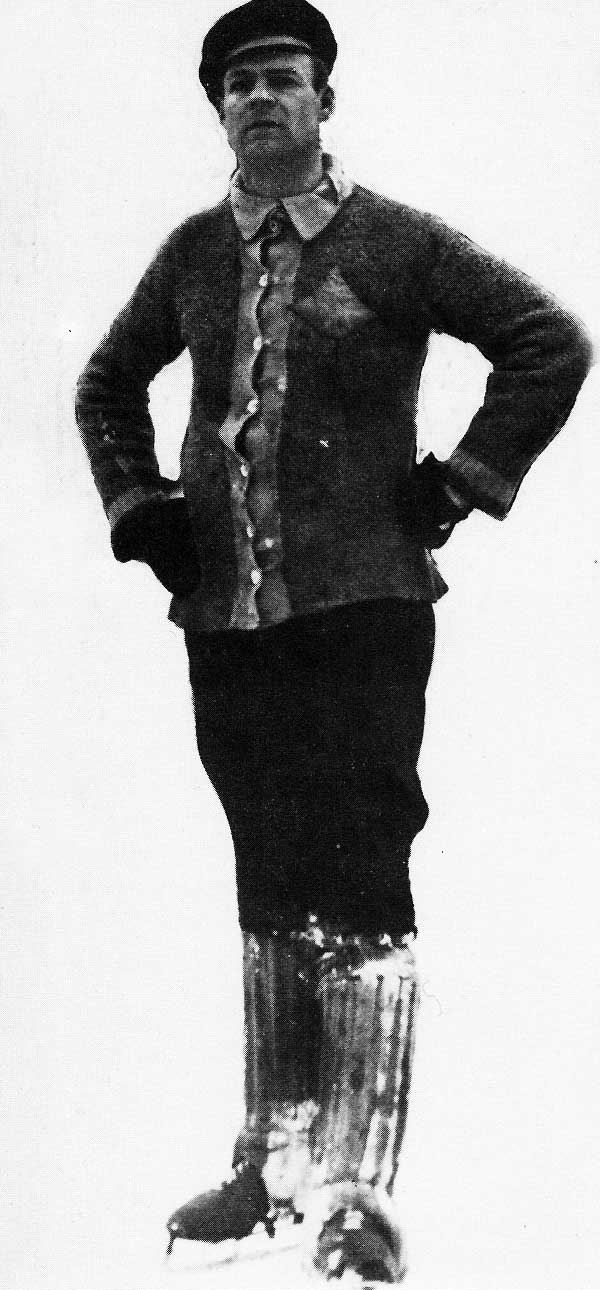

Personal information
- Born: 21 May 1898 Uppsala, Sweden
- Died: 15 January 1950 (aged 51) Gävle, Sweden
- Playing position: Goalkeeper

Senior career*
Years	Team	Apps^{†}	(Gls)^{†}
- Sirius
1913–	IFK Uppsala		

National team
- Sweden
- * Senior club appearances and goals counted for the domestic league only. † Appearances (Goals).

Sven Otto "Sleven" Säfwenberg (21 May 1898 – 15 January 1950) was a Swedish early sportman, mainly active as a bandy goalkeeper but also in ice hockey and sailing.

Born in Uppsala, Säfwenberg underwent education in Påhlmans Handelsinstitut, Stockholm, in 1923 and had various jobs in the sports equipment industry in Germany, Czechoslovakia, and Sweden from 1920 to 1927. In 1927 he started his own business producing and selling bandy sticks and balls.

Säfwenberg played in two clubs, IK Sirius and IFK Uppsala. Sune Almkvist persuaded him to choose IFK Uppsala, where he took over the goalkeeper spot for Seth Howander, which instead became a right defencemen.

After having debuted for the IFK Uppsala team in 1913, Säfwenberg won seven Swedish championships in bandy, from 1915 to 1920 and in 1933. Säfwenberg was awarded the Svenska Dagbladet Gold Medal in 1933. As of 2024, he is still the only one awarded medal for a performance in bandy. Säfwenberg was also awarded the Stora Grabbars Märke in bandy with number 1.

He played one match for the Sweden national ice hockey team in the 1921 Ice Hockey European Championship and became European champion.

As a sailor he represented the Royal Swedish Yacht Club, Upsala Segelsällskap, Gefle Segelsällskap and Segelklubben Surfing. He sailed in the Neptunkryssare class.

He was brother of ice hockey player David and bandy player Harry Säfwenberg. He died in Gävle.

Preceded by Ivar Johansson	Svenska Dagbladet Gold Medal; 1933	Succeeded by Harald Andersson
