= Linköpings AIK =

Sports club in Linköping, Sweden

- Full name: Linköpings allmänna idrottsklubb
- Sport: orienteering bandy, soccer (earlier)
- Founded: 22 October 1908
- Based in: Linköping, Sweden

Linköpings AIK is a sports club in Linköping, Sweden, established on 22 October 1908. The club runs orienteering, earlier even bandy and soccer. The men's bandy team played in the Swedish top division in 1931. and also reached three semifinals when the Swedish national championship was played as a knockout-tournament back in the 1920s.

The men's soccer team played in the Swedish third division during the seasons of 1928–1929 and 1929–1930.

== History ==
In the first year of bandy league system in Sweden, 1930–31, Linköping entered in Division 1 Södra together with Djurgårdens IF, IF Göta, IFK Strängnäs, IFK Uppsala, IK Göta, Nässjö IF, and Örebro SK and finished 7th.
