= IF Vesta =

Swedish sports club

- Full name: Idrottsföreningen Vesta
- Sport: bandy, soccer floorball, ice hockey (earlier)
- Founded: 8 June 1911
- Based in: Uppsala, Sweden

IF Vesta is a sports club in Uppsala, Sweden, established on 8 June 1911. The club runs bandy and soccer, earlier even ice hockey and floorball.

== History ==
In the first year of bandy league system in Sweden, 1930–31, Vesta entered in Division 1 Norra together with AIK, Hammarby IF, IFK Rättvik, IK Sirius, Skutskärs IF, SK Tirfing, and Västerås SK and finished 7th.

The men's bandy team played eleven seasons in the Swedish top division.
