= Örebro SK Bandy =

- City: Örebro, Sweden
- League: Allsvenskan
- Founded: 1908; 117 years ago
- Home arena: Behrn Arena
- Head coach: Tomas Rosdahl

Örebro SK Bandy is the bandy department of sports club Örebro SK from Örebro, Sweden. Örebro SK were founded in 1908 and play their home games indoors at Behrn Arena. The club play in Allsvenskan, the second highest division of Swedish bandy.

== History ==
In the first year of bandy league system in Sweden, 1930–31, Örebro entered in Division 1 Södra together with Djurgårdens IF, IF Göta, IFK Strängnäs, IFK Uppsala, IK Göta, Linköpings AIK, and Nässjö IF and finished 3rd.

== Honours ==
=== Domestic ===
- Swedish Champions:
  - Winners (5): 1955, 1957, 1958, 1965, 1967
  - Runners-up (5): 1951, 1954, 1956, 1968, 1973

== See also ==
- Category:Örebro SK Bandy players
