= Västerås SK =

Västerås SK is a Swedish sports club located in Västerås, with several sections:

- Västerås SK Bandy - men's bandy
- Västerås SK Bandy (women) - women's bandy
- Västerås SK Fotboll - football
- Västerås SK Hockey - ice hockey
