= IK Sirius Bandy =

IK Sirius
- City: Uppsala, Sweden
- League: Elitserien
- Founded: 1907; 119 years ago
- Home arena: Studenternas IP
- Head coach: Oskar Robertsson
- Website: siriusbandy.se
Home colours	Away colours

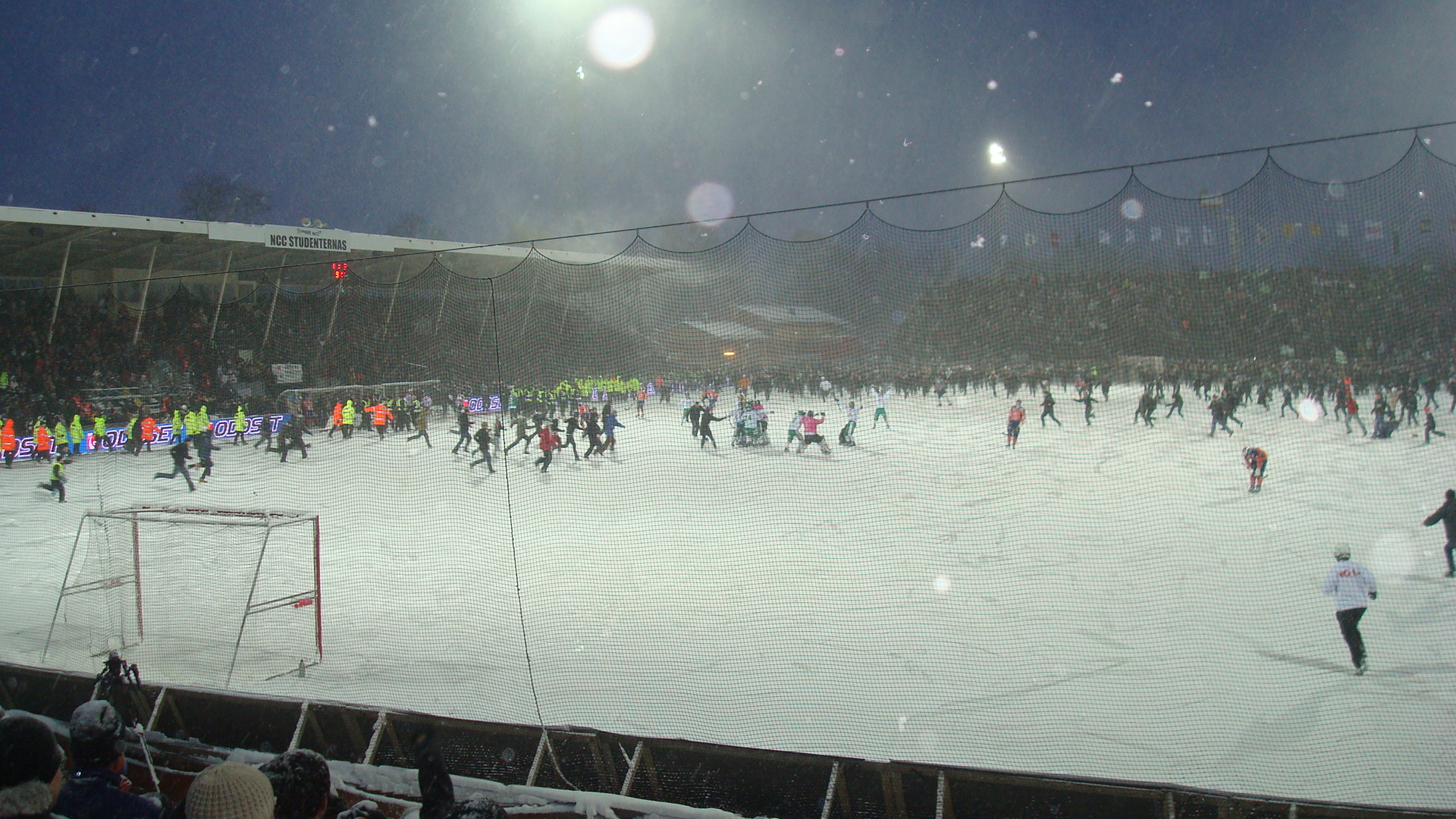
Studenternas IP

IK Sirius is a Swedish bandy club located in Uppsala, currently playing in Elitserien. Formed in 1907, they play their home games at Studenternas IP.

== History ==
The sports club that became IK Sirius was founded on 9 August 1907, and got its current name on 5 April 1908 after having been discussing Svartbäckens IK and IK Spurt. At the time, several sports club existed in the city of Uppsala: IFK Uppsala, IF Thor, IF Heimdal, and Upsala IF. The sports club was founded for athletics, and took up bandy in 1908.

IK Sirius' first success was becoming Swedish runners-up in 1918, they followed this up by becoming Swedish champions twice in 1921 and 1922, but they then didn't have any more success in the league until 1926 where they were runners-up and they were also runners-up in 1928.

In the first year of bandy league system in Sweden, 1930–31, Sirius entered in Division 1 Norra together with AIK, Hammarby IF, IF Vesta, IFK Rättvik, Skutskärs IF, SK Tirfing, and Västerås SK and finished 5th.

In the 1960s the club came back as one of the strongest in the league, finishing second behind Västerås SK in 1960. They won the title the following year beating Edsbyns IF, but the clubs swapped positions in 1962 with Edsbyns IF taking the crown. In 1966 IK Sirius BK won the league for a fourth time but lost the title to Örebro SK the following year. They regained the title for the 5th and currently last time in 1968 beating Örebro SK in the final match.

In 1992 they gained their only World Cup victory beating Sandvikens AIK 7–0 in the final.

In 2008–09 Sirius had their best season in two decades, finishing 3rd in Elitserien and lost to Edsbyns IF in the semi-final off the play-offs.

== Current squad ==
As of 5 January 2022

Note: Flags indicate national team as defined under FIB eligibility rules. Players may hold more than one non-FIB nationality.

No.	Pos.	Nation	Player
13	GK	(Sweden) SWE	Anton Andersson
16	GK	(Sweden) SWE	Ludvig Jonasson
12	DF	(Sweden) SWE	Oscar Qvist
15	DF	(Sweden) SWE	Jerker Ortman
40	DF	(Sweden) SWE	Sune Gustafsson
66	DF	(Sweden) SWE	Stefan Kröller
6	MF	(Sweden) SWE	David Thorén
23	MF	(Sweden) SWE	William Liw

No.	Pos.	Nation	Player
61	MF	(Sweden) SWE	Ted Haraldsson
9	MF	(Sweden) SWE	Matteus Liw
17	MF	(Sweden) SWE	Nils Bergström
39	MF	(Sweden) SWE	Arvid Tapper
62	MF	(Sweden) SWE	Daniel Bäck-Nirs
10	FW	(Sweden) SWE	Ted Bergström Heramb
11	FW	(Sweden) SWE	Albin Thomsen
20	FW	(Sweden) SWE	Kalle Mårtensson

== Honours ==
=== Domestic ===
- Swedish Champions:
  - Winners (5): 1921, 1922, 1961, 1966, 1968
  - Runners-up (5): 1918, 1926, 1928, 1960, 1962
- Swedish Cup:
  - Bronze medalists: 2024

=== International ===
- World Cup:
  - Winners (1): 1992
  - Runners-up (1): 1977
