= Skutskärs IF =

- City: Skutskär, Sweden
- League: Division 1
- Division: Nedre Norrland
- Founded: 1915; 110 years ago
- Home arena: Skutskärs IP

Skutskärs IF is a bandy club in Skutskär, Sweden. The formal name of the club is Skutskärs IF/Bandyklubb. The team colours are green and yellow.

== History ==
The club was formally founded in 1989, when the former Skutskärs IF of 1915 was split in two, one club for bandy and one for association football.

In the first year of bandy league system in Sweden, 1930–31, Skutskär entered in Division 1 Norra together with AIK, Hammarby IF, IF Vesta, IFK Rättvik, IK Sirius, SK Tirfing, and Västerås SK and finished 3rd.

Skutskärs IF has become Swedish champions of bandy twice for men, in 1944 and in 1959, and once for women, in 2018. They still hold the attendance records for an outdoor final.

In February 2000, the club was promoted to the Swedish top division, after being related in 1980.

The club played in Allsvenskan, the second-level bandy league in Sweden, until 2012, when it was relegated to Division 1. It has managed to get promoted to Allsvenskan again in 2014, and will play there in the 2014–2015 season. However they're currently in the last place with zero points through 10 games.

Some notable former players are Anders Östling and Magnus Muhrén.

On 2 August 2022, it was announced that the women's team withdrew from Elitserien for the 2022–23 season, due to lack of players.

== Men's team honours ==
=== Domestic ===
- Swedish Champions:
  - Winners (2): 1944, 1959
  - Runners-up (3): 1937, 1942, 1964

== Women's team honours ==
=== Domestic ===
- Swedish Champions:
  - Winners (1): 2018

== See also ==
- Category:Skutskärs IF players
