= Västerås SK Bandy =

Västerås SK
- Nickname: Den grön-vita (The Green-White)
- City: Västerås, Sweden
- League: Elitserien
- Founded: 29 January 1904; 122 years ago
- Home arena: ABB Arena
- Head coach: Michael Carlsson
- Website: vskbandy.se
Home colours	Away colours

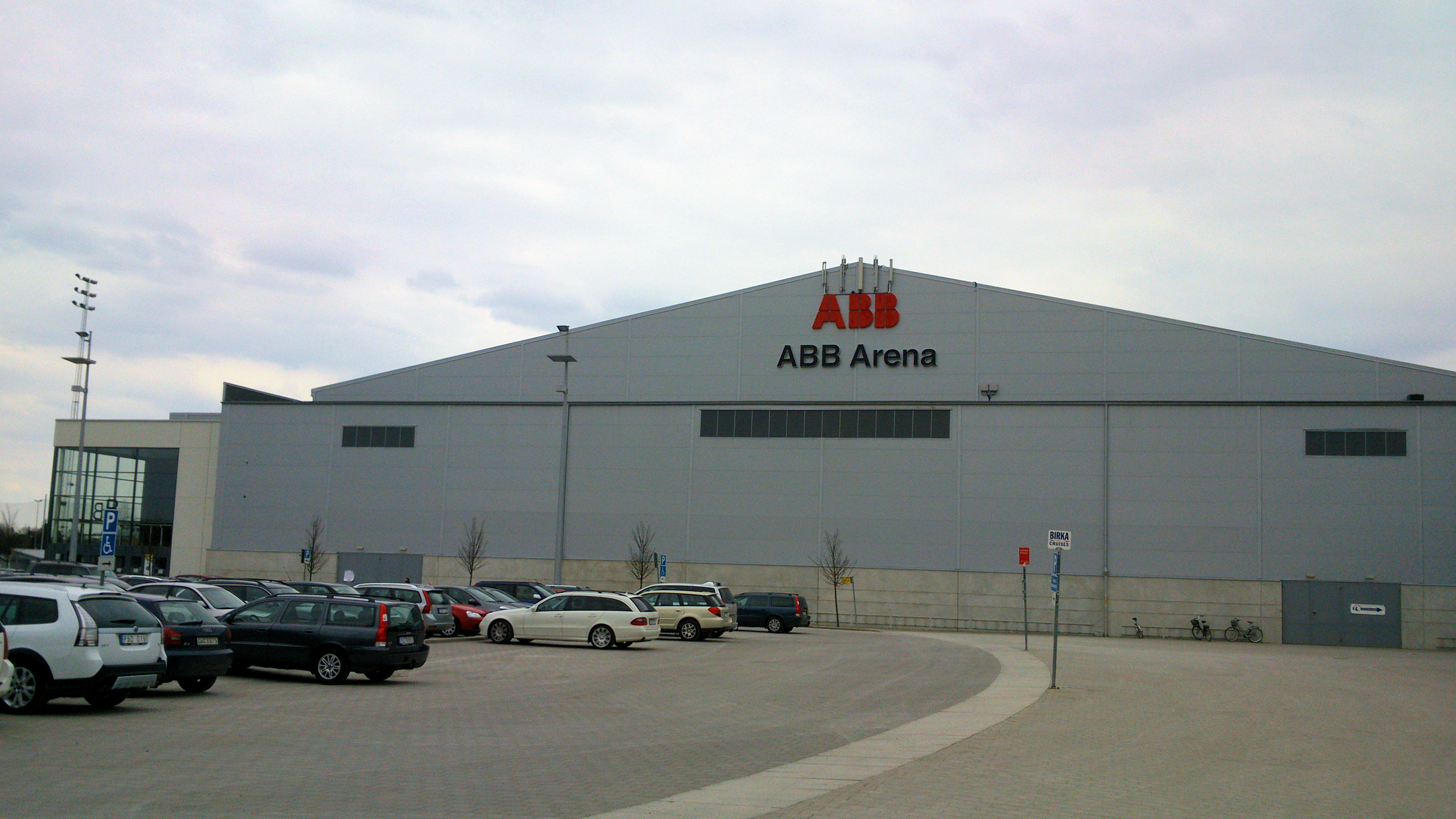
ABB Arena Syd in Västerås, Sweden. Home ground for Västerås SK Bandy.

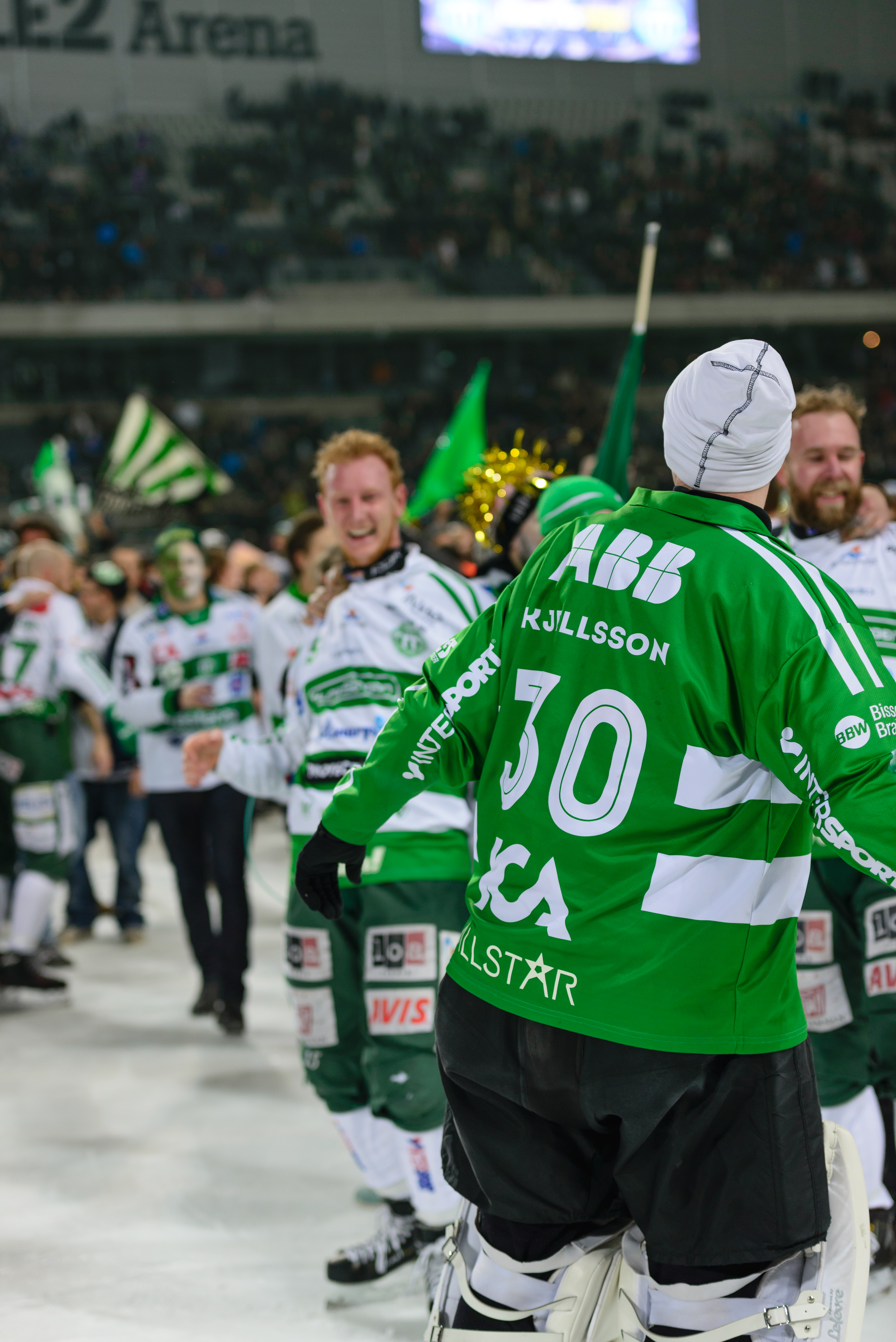
Champions again in 2015

Västerås SK Bandy is the men's bandy side of the Swedish sports club Västerås SK, located in Västerås. The senior side currently plays in the Swedish Elitserien, the top division of Swedish bandy.

Västerås SK BK Dam is the women's bandy side of the Swedish sports club, Västerås SK, which is located in Västerås. This article deals with the men's team.

Västerås SK plays at the ABB Arena South and have won the World Cup seven times. The women's side is Västerås SK BK Dam. The current coach of the senior side is Michael Carlsson, a former player for VSK Bandy and the national team.

== History ==
The club was founded on 29 January 1904.

In the first year of bandy league system in Sweden, 1930–31, Västerås entered in Division 1 Norra together with AIK, Hammarby IF, IF Vesta, IFK Rättvik, IK Sirius, Skutskärs IF, and SK Tirfing and finished 2nd.

On 19 March 2016, the club won its 20th Swedish national championship title by defeating Villa Lidköping BK, 5–2, in the final game. The 21st title came on 18 March 2023, by defeating Villa Lidköping BK, 3–2 following overtime, in the final game.

== Squad ==
As of 20 September 2016

Note: Flags indicate national team as defined under FIB eligibility rules. Players may hold more than one non-FIB nationality.

No.	Pos.	Nation	Player
2	DF	(Sweden) SWE	Stefan Edberg
4	DF	(Sweden) SWE	Anders Bruun
5	MF	(Sweden) SWE	Magnus Joneby (captain)
6	FW	(Sweden) SWE	Simon Jansson
7	MF	(Sweden) SWE	Jakob Bucht
8	FW	(Sweden) SWE	Tobias Holmberg
9	FW	(Sweden) SWE	Jonas Nilsson
10	FW	(Sweden) SWE	Ted Bergström
13	GK	(Sweden) SWE	Andreas Bergwall
14	DF	(Sweden) SWE	Patrik Sjöström

No.	Pos.	Nation	Player
15	DF	(Sweden) SWE	Oscar Gröhn
16	DF	(Sweden) SWE	Rasmus Sjöström
23	DF	(Sweden) SWE	Jesper Norrman
27	MF	(Sweden) SWE	Mikael Olsson
30	GK	(Sweden) SWE	Filip Mörkdal
43	DF	(Sweden) SWE	Simon Folkesson
81	FW	(Sweden) SWE	Max Mårtensson
83	FW	(Sweden) SWE	Emil Juhlén
90	MF	(Sweden) SWE	Janne Rintala

== Honours ==
=== Domestic ===
- Swedish National Champions:
  - Winners (21): 1923, 1924, 1926, 1942, 1943, 1948, 1950, 1960, 1973, 1989, 1990, 1993, 1994, 1996, 1998, 1999, 2001, 2009, 2015, 2016, 2023
  - Runners-up (18): 1922, 1925, 1927, 1929, 1932, 1935, 1936, 1944, 1946, 1947, 1959, 1978, 1991, 1997, 2002, 2014, 2019, 2024
- Swedish Cup Champions:
  - Winners (2): 2015, 2018

=== International ===
- World Cup:
  - Winners (7): 1987, 1989, 1994, 1997, 2000, 2014, 2016
  - Runners-up (3): 1980, 2005, 2007
- European Cup:
  - Winners (5): 1990, 1993, 1994, 1996, 1998

== See also ==
- Västerås SK (disambiguation)
