= Värmbols GoIF =

Sports club in Katrineholm, Sweden

- Full name: Värmbols gymnastik- och idrottsförening
- Sport: soccer, bandy
- Founded: 1927
- Folded: 3 December 1990
- Based in: Katrineholm, Sweden
- Ballpark: Backavallen

Värmbols GoIF was a sports club in Katrineholm, Sweden, established in 1927. The club ran association football and bandy. The men's bandy team played in the Swedish top division in 1931. and 1932.

The men's bandy team played seven seasons in the Swedish top division. The women's soccer team played in the Swedish third division during the 1980s.

The men's soccer team played in the Swedish third division in 1975 and 1976.

On 3 December 1990, the club was split up into Värmbols FC (men's soccer), DFK Värmbol (women's soccer) and Värmbol-Katrineholm BK (bandy).
