= Adrian Brolin =

Swedish footballer (1890–1954)

Personal information
- Date of birth: 7 April 1890
- Place of birth: Hedemora, Sweden
- Date of death: 15 July 1954 (aged 64)
- Place of death: Gothenburg, Sweden
- Position: Forward

Senior career*
Years	Team	Apps	(Gls)
- IFK Uppsala

International career
1911	Sweden	1	(2)
- * Club domestic league appearances and goals

Adrian Brolin (7 April 1890 – 15 July 1954) was a Swedish footballer and bandy player who played for IFK Uppsala.

As a footballer, he featured once for the Sweden men's national football team in 1911, scoring twice against Finland.

As a bandy player, he won nine Swedish championship finals in the 1910s. He made one appearance for Sweden, in 1919.

== Career statistics ==
=== International ===
Appearances and goals by national team and year
National team	Year	Apps	Goals
Sweden	1911	1	2
Total		1	2

International goals

Scores and results list Sweden's goal tally first.

No	Date	Venue	Opponent	Score	Result	Competition
1.	22 October 1911	Eläintarha Stadium, Helsinki, Finland	Finland	3–2	5–2	Friendly
2.	22 October 1911	Eläintarha Stadium, Helsinki, Finland	Finland	4–2	5–2	Friendly
