= Hugo Söderström =

Swedish footballer (1902–1978)

Personal information
- Date of birth: 9 January 1902
- Place of birth: Saltsjöbaden, Sweden
- Date of death: 27 November 1978 (aged 76)
- Place of death: Saltsjöbaden, Sweden
- Position: Centre-half

Senior career*
Years	Team	Apps	(Gls)
–1928	Djurgårdens IF		
1928–1929	AIK		
1929–	Djurgårdens IF		
- * Club domestic league appearances and goals

Hugo Söderström (9 January 1902 – 27 November 1978) was a Swedish footballer and bandy player. As a footballer, he played as a centre-half. He made 22 Allsvenskan appearances for Djurgården and scored 2 goals.

As a bandy player, Söderström won two Swedish championship finals with IK Göta, 1928 and 1929. He made four appearances for Sweden 1928–32.
