= Einar Lundell =

Swedish ice hockey and bandy player

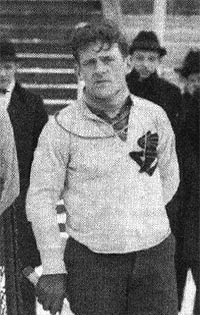
- Born: 9 January 1894 Stockholm, Sweden
- Died: 29 March 1976 (aged 82) Stockholm, Sweden
- Position: Defence
- Played for: Göta; Djurgården
- National team: Sweden
- Playing career: 1919–1934

Carl Arvid Einar "Knatten" Lundell (9 January 1894 – 29 March 1976) was a Swedish ice hockey and bandy player. He competed in the 1920 Summer Olympics. In 1920 he was a member of the Swedish ice hockey team which finished fourth in the Summer Olympics tournament. He played five matches.
