= Östergötlands BF =

Bandy club in Östergötland, Sweden

Östergötlands BF was a bandy team. They lost the 1908 Swedish Championship final to Djurgårdens IF with 3–1 at Idrottsparken.

== Honours ==
=== Domestic ===
- Swedish Champions:
  - Runners-up (1): 1908
