= AIK Bandy =

AIK
- City: Stockholm, Sweden
- League: Elitserien
- Founded: 15 February 1891; 134 years ago
- Home arena: AIK Arena
- Head coach: Andreas Bergwall
- Website: aikbandy.se
Home colours	Away colours

AIK Bandy is the bandy department of sports club Allmänna Idrottsklubben, located in Solna, which is just north of Stockholm.

== Men's team ==
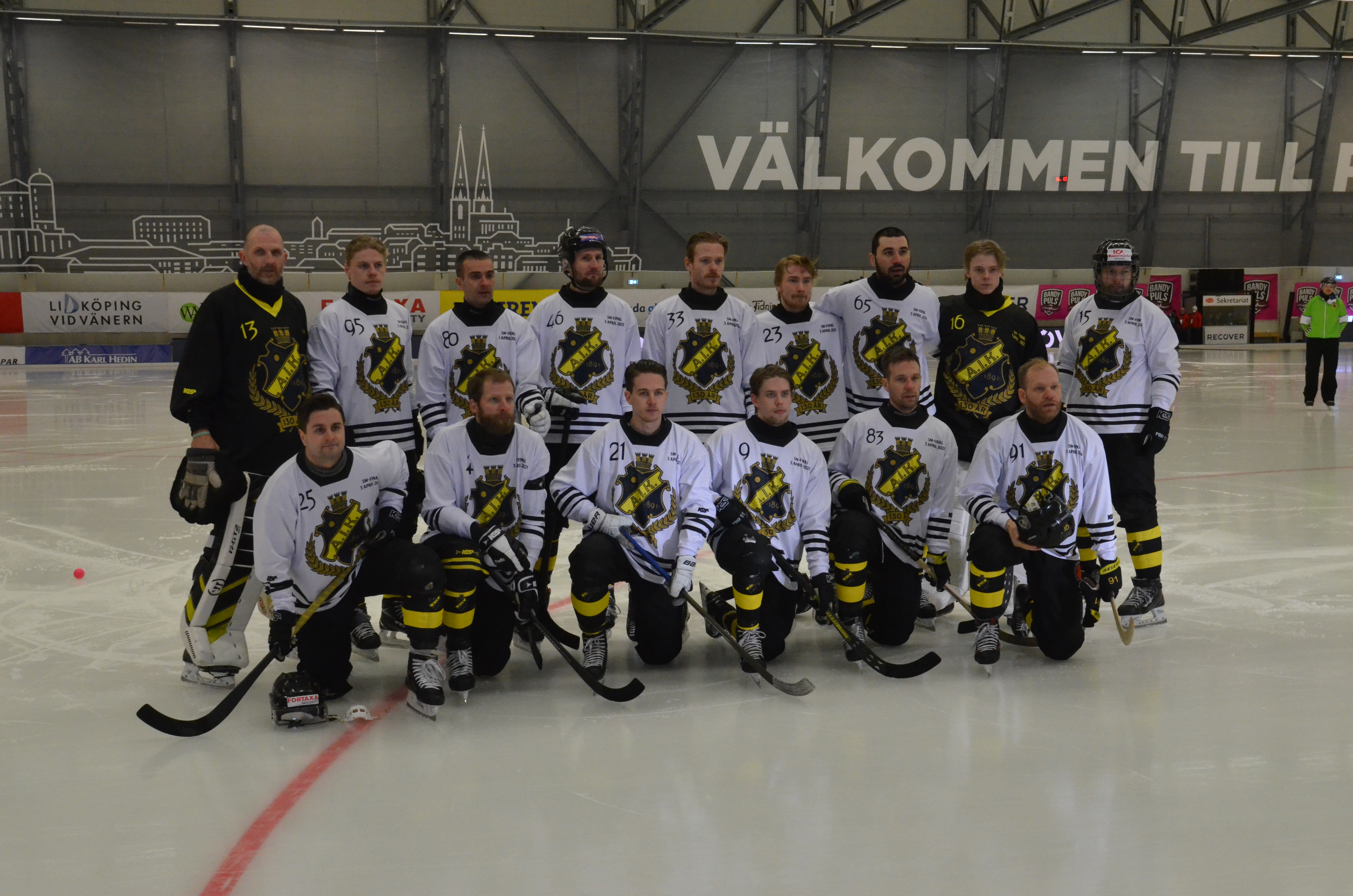
Men's team

The men's team was started in 1905.

In the first year of bandy league system in Sweden, 1930–31, AIK entered in Division 1 Norra together with Hammarby IF, IF Vesta, IFK Rättvik, IK Sirius, Skutskärs IF, SK Tirfing, and Västerås SK and finished 1st. AIK then won the Championship final against the winner of Division 1 Södra, IF Göta, with 4–3 and became Swedish Champions.

AIK previously played at Spånga Idrottspark. Starting with the 2007 season they play at Bergshamra IP. AIK are not as successful in the bandy section as they are in ice hockey and football in recent years but they are still in the third level of the Swedish bandy league system, the league they play in is Division 2 Norra Svealand. The clubs also has a second team who are called Gnaget BK and play one level down the Swedish bandy league system. The club was successful in the early years of the Swedish championship.

The team has gotten promoted to Elitserien 2019–20. After one match of the 2022–23 Elitserien, AIK withdrew.

=== Honours ===
==== Domestic ====
- Swedish Champions:
  - Winners (3): 1909, 1914, 1931
  - Runners-up (4): 1913, 1915, 1917, 2021

==== International ====
- Nordic Games:
  - Winners (1): 1913

== Women's team ==
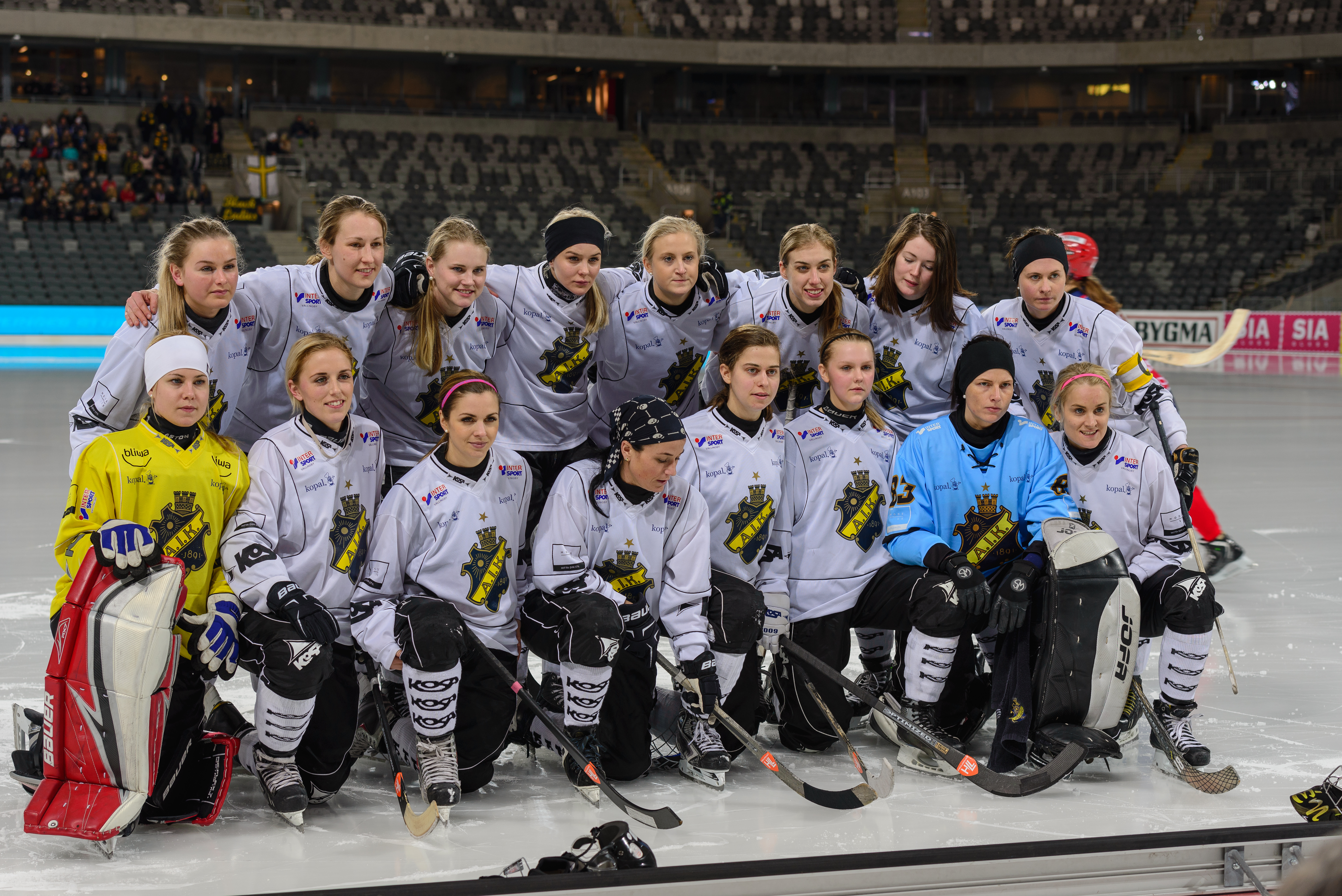
Women's team

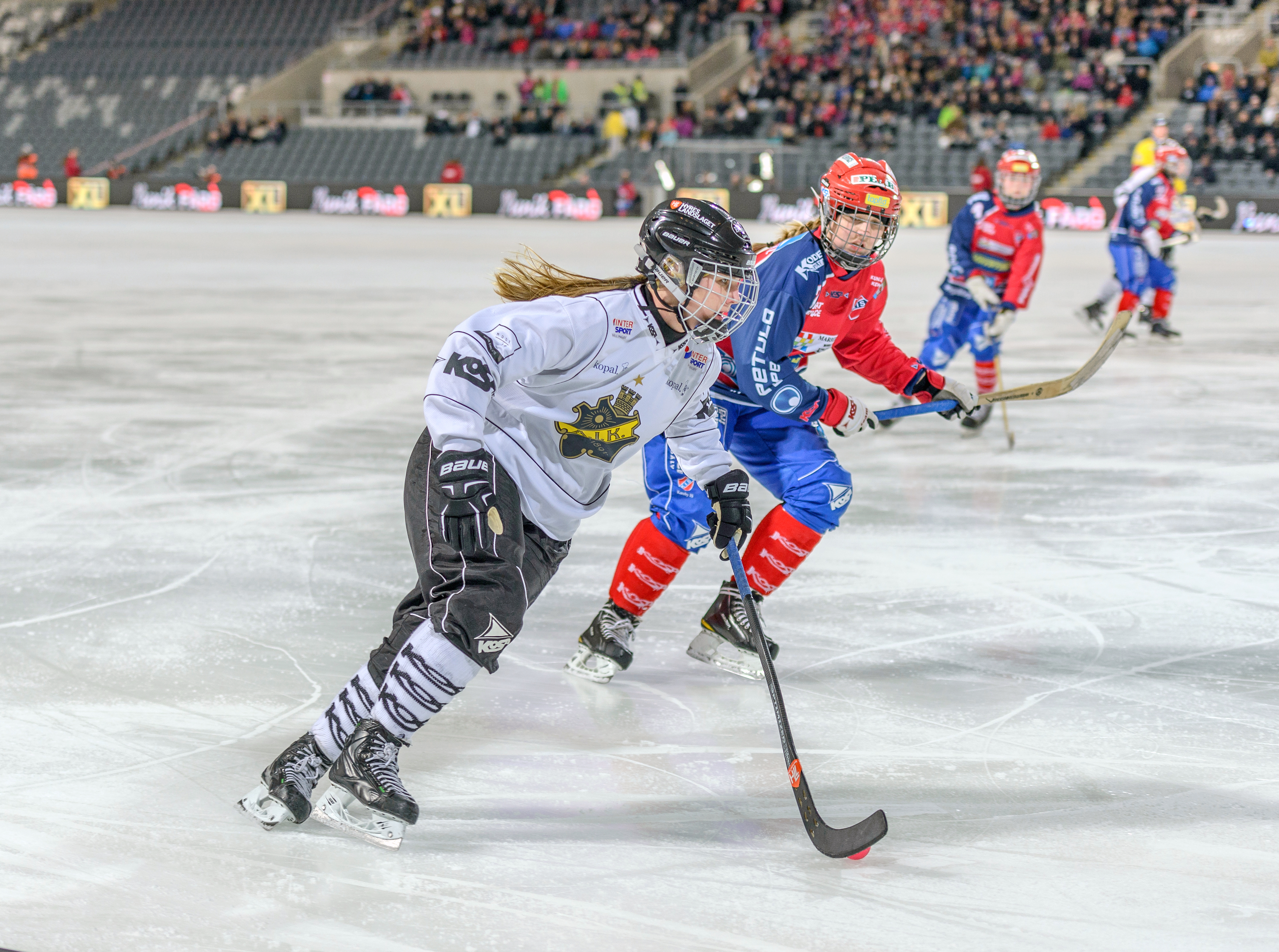
In the national final 2015

The women's team is very successful having won the women's championship eleven times.

=== Honours ===
- Swedish Champions:
  - Winners (15): 1987–88, 1989–90, 1994–95, 1995–96, 1997–98, 1998–99, 1999–00, 2002–03, 2003–04, 2004–05, 2005–06, 2007–08 2009–10, 2011–12, 2013–14
  - Runners-up (10): 1993–94, 2000–01, 2001–02, 2008–09, 2010–11, 2012–13, 2014–15, 2015–16, 2017–18, 2021–22

== See also ==
- Category:AIK Bandy players
