= IFK Rättvik =

- City: Rättvik, Sweden
- League: Allsvenskan
- Division: Nedre Norrland
- Founded: 1906; 119 years ago

Idrottsföreningen Kamraterna Rättvik, commonly known as IFK Rättvik, is a sports club in Rättvik, Sweden. The club colours are white and blue, like for most IFK clubs. The club was founded in 1906 and is playing bandy, association football, and handball.

== History ==
In the first year of bandy league system in Sweden, 1930–31, IFK Rättvik entered in Division 1 Norra together with AIK, Hammarby IF, IF Vesta, IK Sirius, Skutskärs IF, SK Tirfing, and Västerås SK and finished 6th. Between 1931 and 1951, the men's bandy team played 17 seasons in the Swedish top division

The club was promoted to Allsvenskan, the second level bandy league in Sweden, in 2009. 2–5. On 13 March 2021, the men's bandy team qualified for the Swedish top division, Elitserien.

== Honours ==
=== Domestic ===
- Swedish Champions:
  - Runners-up (1): 1938
