= Georg Johansson (ice hockey) =

Swedish ice hockey and bandy player (1898–1964)

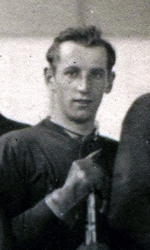
- Johansson at the 1920 Olympics.
- Born: 10 May 1898 Menton, France
- Died: 20 April 1964 (aged 65) Stockholm, Sweden
- Position: Left wing
- Played for: Göta; Djurgården
- National team: Sweden
- Playing career: 1919–1934

Georg Lars Wilhelm Johansson (later Brandius; 10 May 1898 – 20 April 1964) was a Swedish ice hockey and bandy player. He competed in the 1920 Summer Olympics. In 1920 he was a member of the Swedish ice hockey team which finished fourth in the Summer Olympics tournament. He played all six matches and scored three goals.
