= Djurgårdens IF Bandy =

Djurgårdens IF
- City: Stockholm, Sweden
- League: Allsvenskan
- Division: Östra
- Founded: 12 March 1891; 134 years ago
- Home arena: Östermalms IP
- Head coach: Hampus Nilsson
- Website: difbandy.se
Home colours	Away colours

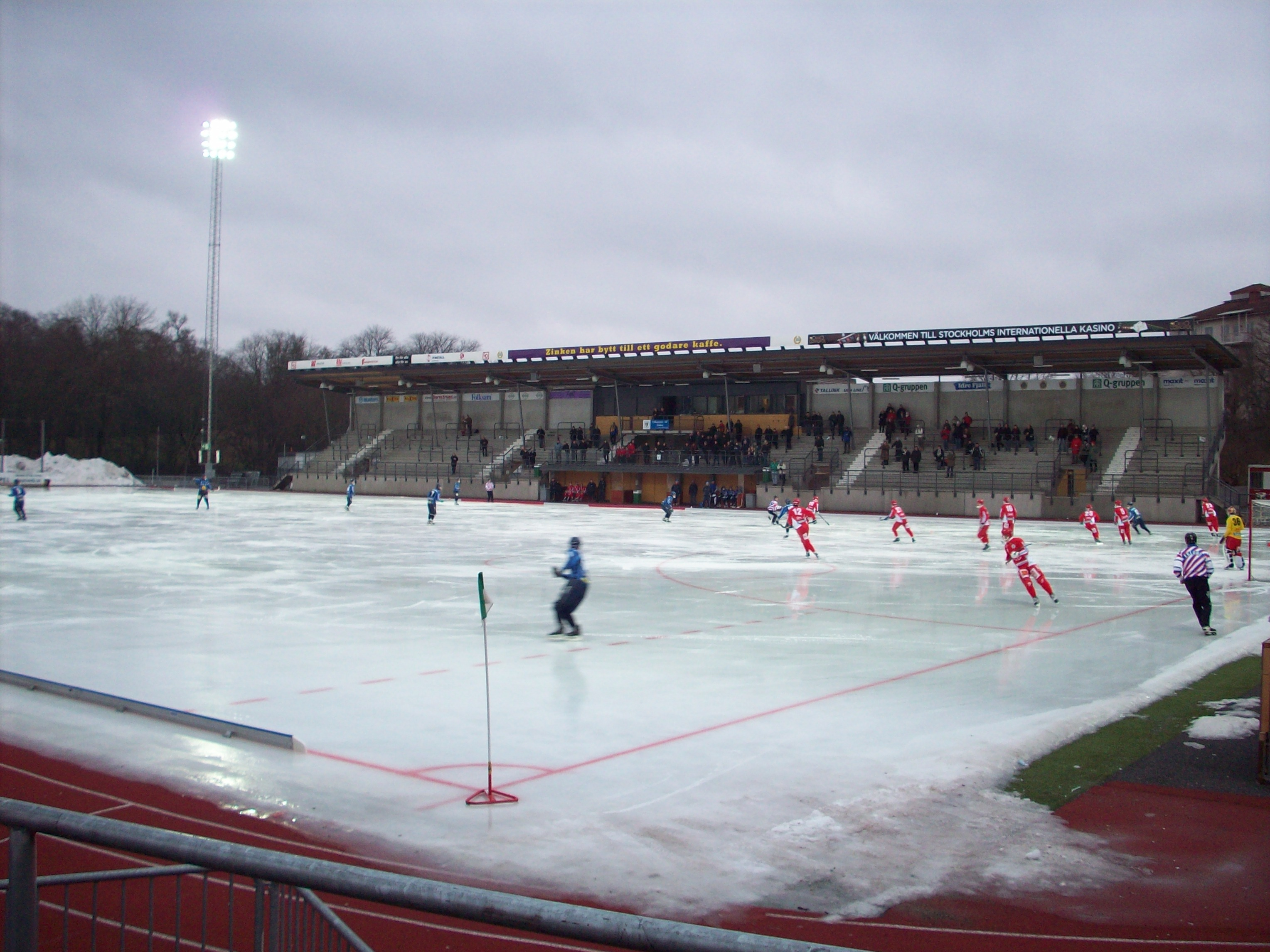
Djurgårdens IF (in blue) against Gustavsbergs IF at Zinkensdamms IP.

Djurgårdens IF Bandy is the bandy section of Swedish sports club Djurgårdens IF, located in Stockholm.

== History ==
Djurgårdens IF was one of the teams playing at the Nordic Games in 1905, where the team lost the final to Uppsala HK. The club has been in the Swedish championship finals seven times before 1930, and won two of them, in 1908 and 1912.

The 1908 team, who defeated Östergötlands BF with 3–1 at Idrottsparken in Norrköping, consisted of Bror Modén, Gunnar Friberg, Karl Öhman, Algot Nilsson, Götrik Frykman, Birger Walla, Arvid Spångberg, Ivar Friberg, Erik Lavass, Erik Andéhn, and Gottfrid Johansson.

The 1912 champions title was shared with IFK Uppsala after a first draw on lake Råstasjön in Solna, since no rematch could be played. The 1912 team, consisted of Knut Gustafsson, Ragnar Wicksell, Karl Öhman, Erik Lavass, Götrik Frykman, Folke Wahlgren, Jean Söderberg, Sten Söderberg, Karl-Gunnar Karlsson-Arnö, Gottfrid Johansson, and Ivar Friberg.

In the first year of bandy league system in Sweden, 1930–31, Djurgården entered in Division 1 Södra together with IF Göta, IFK Strängnäs, IFK Uppsala, IK Göta, Linköpings AIK, Nässjö IF, and Örebro SK and finished 5th.

After the 2006–07 season, Djurgården advanced to Allsvenskan, the second highest league in Swedish bandy, but has since been relegated to Division 1 again. At the end of the 2013–14 season, Djurgården narrowly missed the qualification to Allsvenskan, thus playing in Division 1 in the 2014–15 season. In 2014, Djurgården was close to bankruptcy but merged with Spånga/Bromstens BK. In the 2015–16 season, Djurgården played in Allsvenskan again.

Djurgården played their home games at Spånga IP for a couple of years, but for the 2017–18 season they moved to Östermalms IP, closer to the club's traditional home areas.

== Honours ==
=== Domestic ===
- Swedish Champions:
  - Winners (2): 1908, 1912
  - Runners-up (5): 1909, 1911, 1914, 1916, 1930
