= Ruben Carlsson =

Swedish ice hockey player

Personal information
- Nickname: Rubbe
- Nationality: Swedish
- Born: 29 January 1913; Stockholm, Sweden
- Died: 14 February 2004 (aged 91); Stockholm, Sweden

Sport
- Sport: Ice hockey

Ruben "Rubbe" Brynolf Carlsson (29 January 1913 – 14 February 2004) was a Swedish ice hockey player. He competed in the men's tournament at the 1936 Winter Olympics.
