= Holger Engberg =

Swedish ice hockey player (1909–1993)

Personal information
- Nationality: Swedish
- Born: 4 January 1909 Stockholm, Sweden
- Died: 28 February 1993 (aged 84) Stockholm, Sweden

Sport
- Sport: Ice hockey

Vagner Edvard Holger Engberg (4 January 1909 – 28 February 1993) was a Swedish ice hockey player. He competed in the men's tournament at the 1936 Winter Olympics.
