= IK Göta =

- City: Bromma, Stockholm
- League: Hockeytvåan Östra
- Founded: 1 October 1900; 125 years ago
- Home arena: Stora Mossens ishall
- Website: ikgota.se

Idrottsklubben Göta, commonly known as IK Göta, is a sports club in Stockholm, now active in ice hockey, that was successful in several sports such as athletics, football, handball, field hockey, ice hockey, and bandy during the 20th century. Of them, nine Swedish championships in men's ice hockey, including the inaugural 1922 edition, ranks fourth among Swedish teams after Djurgården, Brynäs and Färjestad.

== History ==
IK Göta was founded on 1 October 1900. The club had its first base att Odengatan in Stockholm and practiced gymnastics. It had been founded by military personnel from Göta Life Guards. Cross-country skiing was introduced in the year of founding. By the end of their first year, they had 19 members. The club then broadened their range of activities to include athletics and football and other sports.

Ernst Wide won the national championship title on 800 metres and 1500 metres in 1909, and then continued to win three more titles in the 800 metres event and four more in the 1500 metres event in the following years until 1914. In 1918, IK Göta started orienteering. Starting in 1919, Sven Lundgren, won the same national title events as Wide a total of eight times.

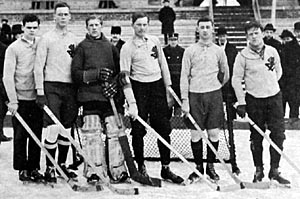
The 1922 ice hockey team and Swedish champions. Pictured: from left: Bror Arwe, Birger Holmqvist, Ejnar Olsson, Einar Svensson, Åke Nyberg, and Einar Lundell

The 1920s saw the introduction of ice hockey in Sweden and the club was pioneers of the sport. On 1 February 1921, IK Göta played the second ice hockey match in Sweden, when they played Berliner Schlittschuhclub and won 2–1. A couple of weeks later, on 17 February 1921, IK Göta played in the first ice hockey match in between two Swedish team, when they beat IFK Stockholm, 13–0. They won the first national ice hockey championship against Hammarby IF with a score of 6-0 the in 1922. IK Göta then won the following two championships as well as four in row from 1927 to 1930. The club took the initiative to form the Swedish Ice Hockey Association in 1922 together with AIK, IF Linnéa, Hammarby IF, Nacka SK, and Mariebergs IK.

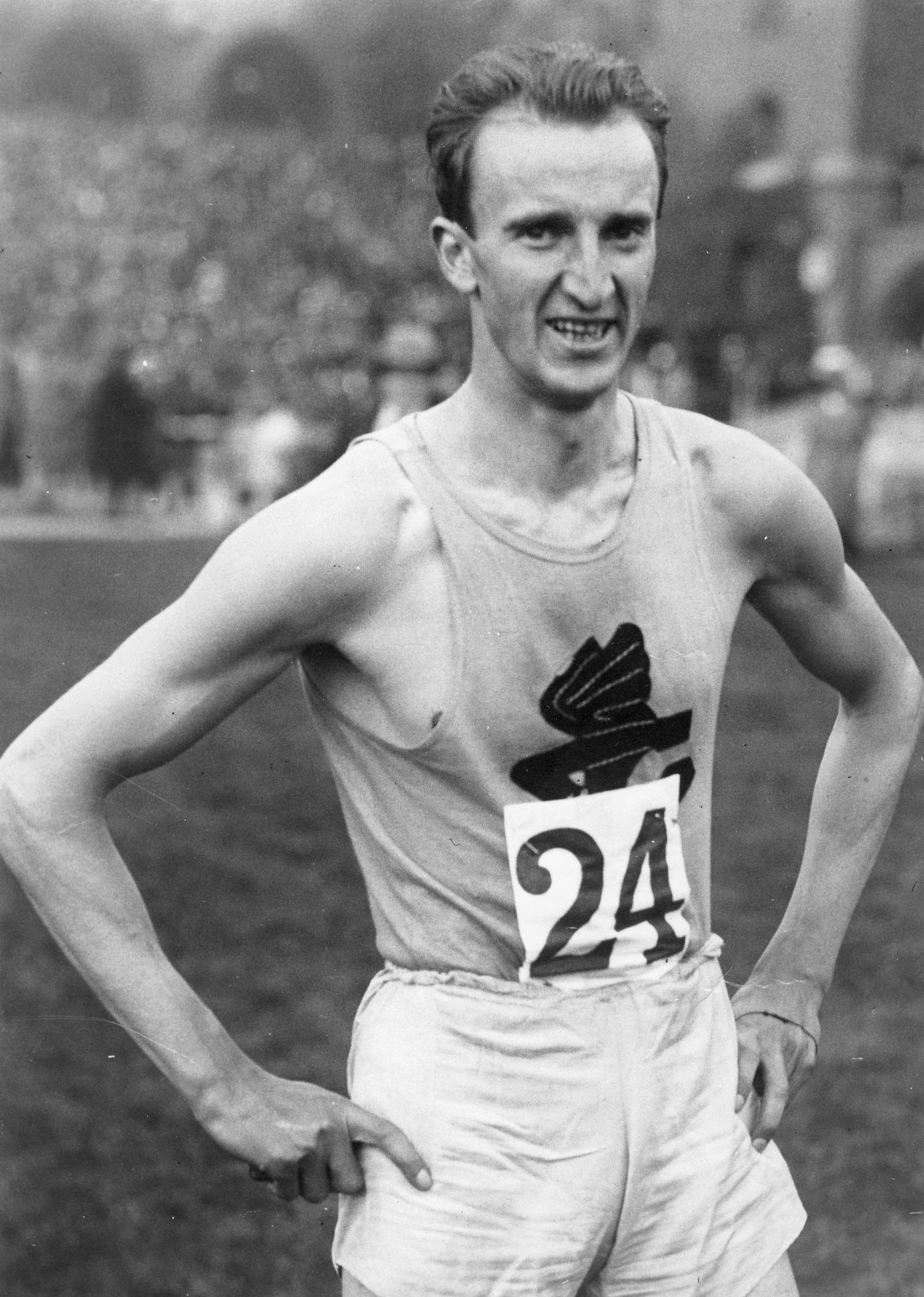
Göta athlete Sten Pettersson

In 1925, Sten Pettersson won the national titles in 100 metres, 200 metres, 110 metres hurdles, 400 metres hurdles, 4 × 100 metres relay, and 4 × 400 metres relay during the Swedish Athletics Championships as well as the standing high jump during the indoor championship.

During the 1920, IK Göta also won the national bandy championship in 1925, 1927, 1928, and 1929. In bandy, they played in the first year of bandy league system in Sweden, 1930–31 – IK Göta entered in Division 1 Södra together with Djurgårdens IF, IF Göta, IFK Strängnäs, IFK Uppsala, Linköpings AIK, Nässjö IF, and Örebro SK and finished 2nd.

In 1927, IK Göta took up handball, when IF Stefaniterna, who were practicing handball and football, joined the club. In handball, IK Göta played in top-tier Allsvenskan before dropping the sport in 1936, only to restart it the year after. In football, the club played in Stockholmsserien, Klass I, from 1928 to 1933. A women's bandy team was started in 1929. In 1930, Maj Jacobsson won the national titles in 80 metres, 200 metres, 80 metres hurdles, long jump, standing long jump and 4 × 80 metres relay at the Swedish Women's Athletics Championships.

In 1939 the club bought a cabin by the lake Fjäturen. They won the 1940 Swedish Ice Hockey Championship, their eighth. Up until 1940, the club had won 119 national championship titles in athletics. They had also won the Mästerskapsstandaret for best club at the Swedish Athletics Championships four times, in 1924, 1925, 1928, and 1930. Men's bandy was dropped in 1940. During the 1940s, the women's bandy team played in a series in Vasaparken in Stockholm together with KSK Artemis, Djurgårdens IF, and Föreningen GCI.

They won the 1948 Swedish Ice Hockey Championship, their ninth. Ten years later, in 1958, the ice hockey team was relegated from the top-tier Division 1 This was the end of a total of 34 seasons in the highest league. In 1948, the club hut at Fjäturen, Götagården, burnt down.

The women's bandy team won the inaugural national championship title in 1973, and the followed up with six consecutive titles from 1976 to 1981, and then again won in 1983. Göta had also won the first Riksmästerskap bandy final in 1971 before it became a nation championship.

The women's field hockey team of IK Göta won the national championships titles in 1982, 1985, and 1986.

The ice hockey section merged with Tranebergs IF in 2007, forming junior and senior teams under the name Göta Traneberg IK. This is IK Göta's only active sport. The section operates kids, junior and senior ice hockey teams.

Göta Traneberg currently plays in Hockeytvåan Östra, the fourth tier of ice hockey in Sweden.

The club has also been active in bowling and rugby.

== Emblem and colours ==
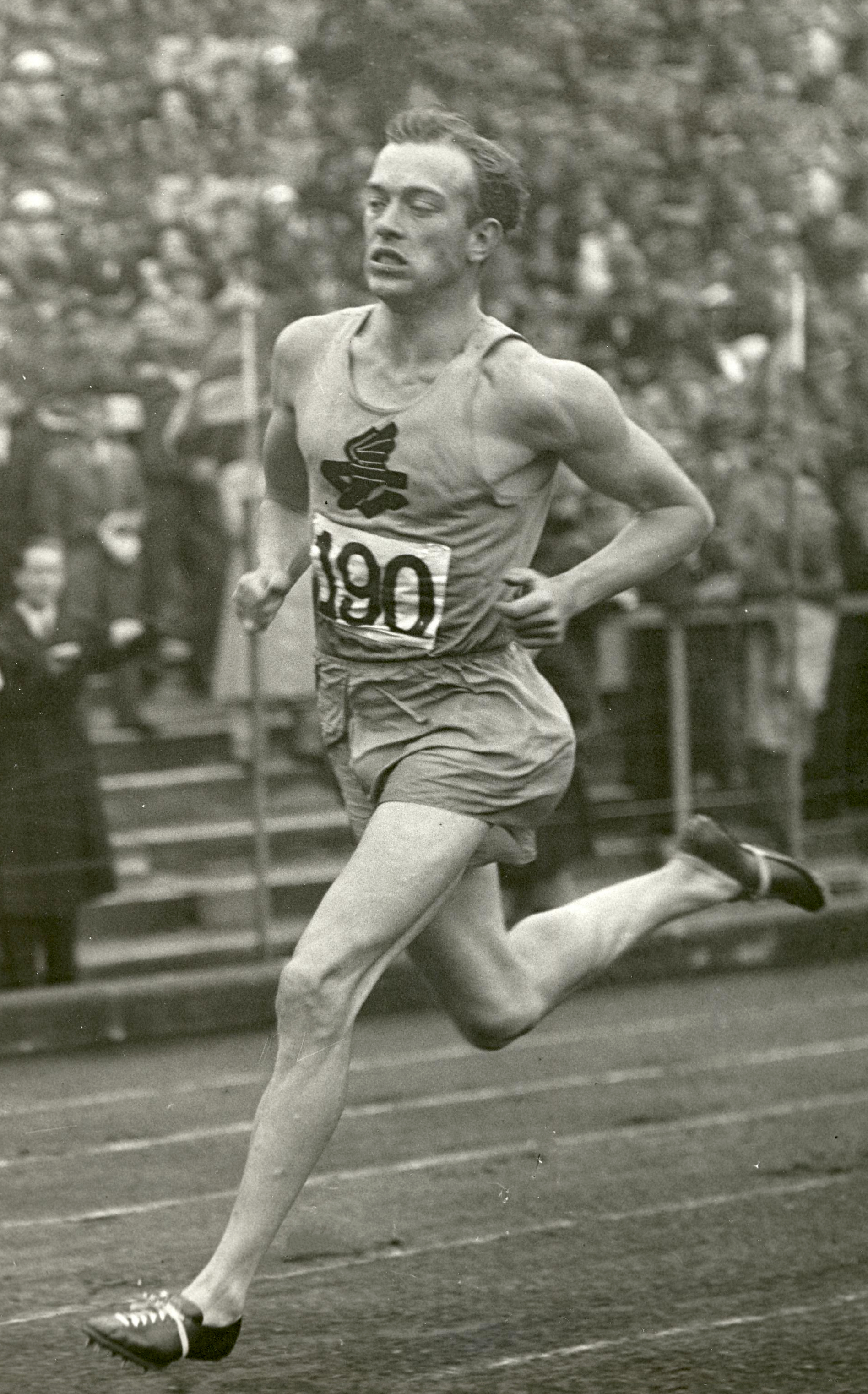
Athlete Bertil von Wachenfeldt in the IK Göta uniform

The team's logotype is a winged foot. IK Göta uses grey uniforms. Hence they were nicknamed de stålgrå (lit. 'the Steel Greys'). The ice hockey team now plays in red.

== Venues ==
The first site the team competed/played at was the Olympic Stadium in Stockholm.

A few years later the team's site were moved to nearby Östermalms IP.

The ice hockey team relocated in the mid 1970s, due to less youths in central Stockholm, to the Bromma area, a Stockholm suburb within the city limits.

The idea was to be able to grow the team with more junior teams.

== Honours ==
=== Bandy ===
- Swedish champions:
  - Winners (4): 1925, 1927, 1928, 1929

=== Ice hockey ===
- Swedish champions:
  - Winners (9): 1922, 1923, 1924, 1927, 1928, 1929, 1930, 1940, 1948
