= Karl Öhman =

Swedish footballer and bandy player

Senior career*
Years	Team	Apps	(Gls)
- Djurgården
- * Club domestic league appearances and goals

Karl Öhman is a Swedish retired bandy player and footballer. As a bandy player, Öhman was part of the Djurgården Swedish champions' team of 1908 and 1912. As a footballer, Öhman made 29 Svenska Serien appearances for Djurgården and scored 8 goals.
