= Folke Wahlgren =

Swedish bandy player

Senior career*
Years	Team	Apps^{†}	(Gls)^{†}
- Djurgården
- * Senior club appearances and goals counted for the domestic league only. † Appearances (Goals).

Folke Wahlgren was a Swedish bandy player. Wahlgren was part of the Djurgården Swedish champions' team of 1912.
