= Gunnar Galin =

Swedish sportsperson (1902–1997)

Personal information
- Full name: Gunnar Alvar Galin
- Date of birth: 4 April 1902
- Date of death: 21 January 1997 (aged 94)
- Position: Inside left

Youth career
- AIK

Senior career*
Years	Team	Apps	(Gls)
1917–1921	AIK		
1921–1922	SC Corso		
1922–1926	AIK		
1927	Djurgårdens IF	13	(5)
1928–1929	AIK	7	(1)
1929–1931	Djurgårdens IF		
1931–	AIK		
- * Club domestic league appearances and goals

Gunnar Alvar Galin (4 April 1902 – 21 January 1997) was a Swedish footballer, ice hockey player and bandy player. He was president of the International Bandy Federation from its foundation in 1955 to 1963.

== Football career ==
Galin for AIK during his youth career. He made 13 Allsvenskan appearances (five goals) for Djurgården and seven Allsvenskan appearances (one goal) for AIK. He played as an inside left.
