= Birger Walla =

Swedish bandy player

Senior career*
Years	Team	Apps^{†}	(Gls)^{†}
- Djurgården
- * Senior club appearances and goals counted for the domestic league only. † Appearances (Goals).

Birger Walla was a Swedish bandy player. Walla was part of the Djurgården Swedish champions' team of 1908.
