= Gottfrid Johansson =

Swedish footballer (1891–1962)

Personal information
- Date of birth: 16 March 1891
- Date of death: 14 April 1962 (aged 71)
- Position: Forward

Senior career*
Years	Team	Apps	(Gls)
- Djurgården

International career
1914–1920	Sweden	3	(1)
- * Club domestic league appearances and goals

Gottfrid Johansson (16 March 1891 – 14 April 1962) was a Swedish international football forward and bandy player.

As a footballer, Johansson was part of the Djurgården Swedish champions' team of 1915, 1917, and 1920. Johansson made three appearances for Sweden and scored one goals He made his debut in a friendly against Norway in 1914, in which he also scored his only international goal.

As a bandy player, Johansson was part of the Djurgården Swedish champions' team in bandy of 1908 and 1912.

== Honours ==
=== Football ===
Djurgårdens IF

- Svenska Mästerskapet: 1915, 1917, 1920

=== Bandy ===
Djurgårdens IF

- Svenska Mästerskapet: 1908, 1912
