= Erik Andéhn =

Swedish bandy player

Senior career*
Years	Team	Apps^{†}	(Gls)^{†}
- Djurgården
- * Senior club appearances and goals counted for the domestic league only. † Appearances (Goals).

Erik Andéhn is a retired Swedish bandy player. Andéhn was part of the Djurgården Swedish champions' team of 1908.
