= Sune Almkvist =

Swedish sportsman and sports administrator

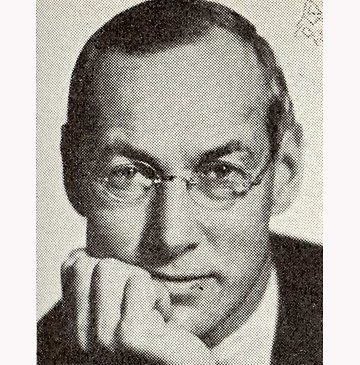

Personal information
- Born: 4 February 1886
- Died: 8 August 1975

Sport
- Sport: bandy; football; tennis
- Club: IFK Uppsala Bandy
- Team: Sweden men's national football team

Sune Lison Almkvist (4 February 1886 – 8 August 1975) was an early Swedish sportsman active in bandy, football and tennis, and a sports administrator. For his bandy achievements, he was inducted with the number 1 in the Swedish Bandy Hall of Fame in 2011.

Almkvist was the first major Swedish bandy player and the first who received the award Stor grabb. He played for IFK Uppsala, a club which dominated bandy in Sweden from the first Swedish championship in 1907 until 1920.

Almkvist started his long bandy career at Upsala Gymnasisters HK at the age of 15 in 1901. With the club, he won the 1902 Nordic Games Cup, when they defeated Stockholms HK 2–0. In 1905, Upsala Gymnasisters HK, now renamed to Upsala HK, won the Nordic Games Cup again, this time with Almkvist contributing with 19 goals in a 27–1 win against the Royal Military Academy.

He was also the first president of the Swedish Bandy Association from its founding in 1925 until 1950.

Almkvist also played four matches for the Sweden men's national football team at the 1908 Summer Olympics. In tennis, Almkvist won national titles in doubles on two occasions.
