= Karl-Gunnar Karlsson-Arnö =

Swedish bandy player

Personal information
- Born: 26 November 1892
- Died: 30 March 1958 (aged 65)

Senior career*
Years	Team	Apps^{†}	(Gls)^{†}
- Djurgården
- * Senior club appearances and goals counted for the domestic league only. † Appearances (Goals).

Karl-Gunnar Karlsson-Arnö (26 November 1892 – 30 March 1958) was a Swedish bandy player. Karlsson-Arnö was part of the Djurgården Swedish champions' team of 1912.
