= Algot Nilsson =

Swedish bandy player

Personal information
- Born: 5 November 1876
- Died: 13 December 1966 (aged 90)

Senior career*
| Years | Team | Apps^{†} | (Gls)^{†} |
- Djurgården
- * Senior club appearances and goals counted for the domestic league only. † Appearances (Goals).

Johan Algot Nilsson (born 5 November 1876 – 13 December 1966) was a Swedish bandy player and footballer, who represented Djurgårdens IF Bandy and Djurgårdens IF Fotboll around 1900. Nilsson was part of the Djurgården Swedish champions' team of 1908.
