= Einar Lindqvist =

Swedish ice hockey player and bandy player

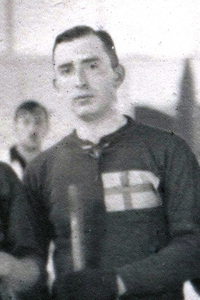
- Lindqvist at the 1920 Olympics.
- Born: 31 May 1895 Uppsala, Sweden
- Died: 26 April 1972 (aged 76) Uppsala, Sweden
- Position: Defence
- National team: Sweden
- Playing career: 1919–1921

Einar Laurentius "Linkan" Lindqvist (31 May 1895 – 26 April 1972) was a Swedish ice hockey and bandy player. He competed in the 1920 Summer Olympics. He died in Uppsala, Sweden. In 1920 he was a member of the Swedish ice hockey team which finished fourth in the Summer Olympics tournament. He played all six matches and scored three goals.
