= Slottsbrons IF =

Sports club in Slottsbron, Sweden

- Full name: Slottsbrons idrottsförening
- Sport: soccer bandy
- Founded: 1918
- Based in: Slottsbron, Sweden
- Stadium: Strandvallen

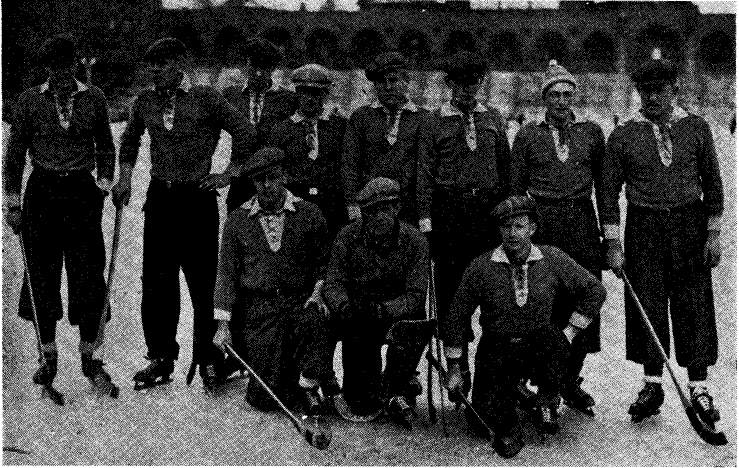
The Swedish bandy champions 1934

Slottsbrons IF is a sports club in Slottsbron, Sweden, playing bandy and association football. The club was founded in 1918. The club has become Swedish champions of bandy four times, 1934, 1936, 1938, and 1941.

== Honours ==
=== Domestic ===
- Swedish Champions:
  - Winners (4): 1934, 1936, 1938, 1941
  - Runners-up (1): 1945
