= SK Tirfing =

Swedish sports club

- Full name: Sportklubben Tirfing
- Sport: bandy, team handball
- Founded: 20 January 1923
- Based in: Harnäs, Sweden
- Championships: 1 (bandy, 1930)

SK Tirfing is a sports club in Skutskär in northern Uppland in Sweden. Established on 20 January 1923, the club won the Swedish national men's bandy championship in 1930. Between 1931 and 1942, the club played seven seasons in the Swedish top division. The club gave up bandy in 1981, and what remains is a women's team handball section.

== History ==
In the first year of bandy league system in Sweden, 1930–31, Tirfing entered in Division 1 Norra together with AIK, Hammarby IF, IF Vesta, IFK Rättvik, IK Sirius, Skutskärs IF, and Västerås SK and finished fourth.

== Honours ==
=== Domestic ===
- Swedish Champions:
  - Winners (1): 1930
