= Einar Svensson =

Swedish sportsman (1894–1959)

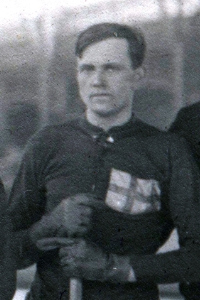
- Svensson at the 1920 Olympics
- Born: 27 September 1894 Stockholm, Sweden
- Died: 20 March 1959 (aged 64) Stockholm, Sweden
- Position: Defence
- National team: Sweden
- Playing career: 1919–1933

Svensson in 1930

John Einar "Stor-Klas" Svensson (27 September 1894 – 20 March 1959) was a Swedish ice hockey player, bandy player, footballer and football manager. He competed in the 1920 Summer Olympics. In 1920 he was a member of the Swedish ice hockey team which finished fourth in the Summer Olympics tournament. He played five matches and scored two goals.

From 1935 to 1944, he coached Djurgårdens IF football section.
