= IFK Uppsala =

Sports club in Uppsala, Sweden

- Full name: Idrottsföreningen kamraterna Uppsala
- Sport: Bandy, soccer, handball (earlier), track and field athletics (earlier)
- Founded: 1895
- Based in: Uppsala, Sweden
- Ballpark: Stenhagens IP
- Championships: 12 (men's bandy, 1907, 1910, 1911, 1912 (title shared), 1913, 1915, 1916, 1917, 1918, 1919, 1920, 1933)

IFK Uppsala is a Swedish sports club located in Uppsala in Sweden, with several departments:

- IFK Uppsala Fotboll, association football department
- IFK Uppsala Bandy, bandy department

The club was established in 1895. On 30 January 1921, the ice hockey team was involved in the first ice hockey game on Swedish soil, defeating German Berliner SC, 4-1, in front of 2 022 spectators at the Stockholm Olympic Stadium.
