= IFK Uppsala Bandy =

Bandy club in Uppsala, Sweden

- Founded: 1895
- Based in: Uppsala, Sweden
- Stadium: Studenternas IP
- National championships: 12
- World Cup champions: 0

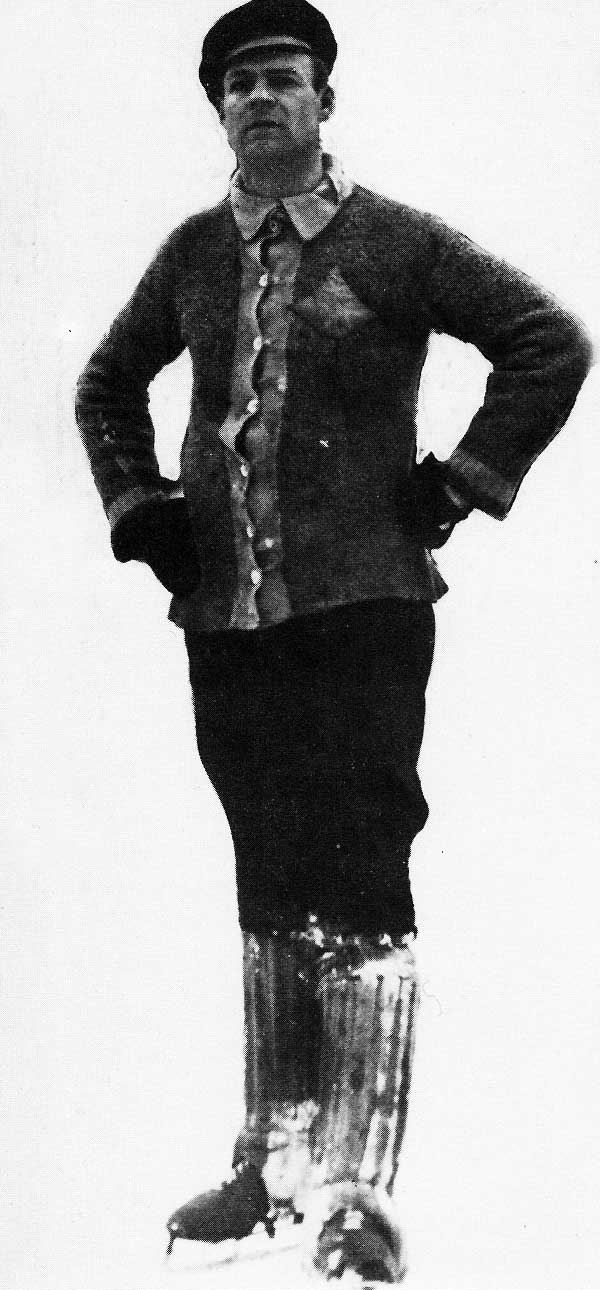
The legendary goalkeeper Sven Säfwenberg

IFK Uppsala Bandy is the bandy department of the IFK Uppsala sports club. The club was founded in 1895 and based in Uppsala, Sweden. The club played bandy, association football and athletics already from the start. IFK was one of the major clubs in all of these sports in the first half of the 20th century. In the 1940s it was also successful in handball.

== Bandy ==
IFK has won 12 Swedish bandy championships, but the last time was in 1933 when IF Göta was beaten in the final 11–1.

In the first year of bandy league system in Sweden, 1930–31, IFK Uppsala entered in Division 1 Södra together with Djurgårdens IF, IF Göta, IFK Strängnäs, IK Göta, Linköpings AIK, Nässjö IF, and Örebro SK and finished 8th.

The bandy team was disbanded in 1990, but the club took up the sport again for the 2006–07 season.

== Honours ==
=== Domestic ===
- Swedish Champions:
  - Winners (12): 1907, 1910, 1911, 1912, 1913, 1915, 1916, 1917, 1918, 1919, 1920, 1933
  - Runners-up (2): 1921, 1934

== See also ==
- Category:IFK Uppsala Bandy players
