= Seth Howander =

Swedish ice hockey player, bandy player, and footballer

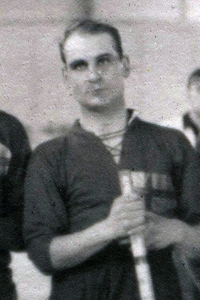
- Howander at the 1920 Olympics.
- Born: 6 October 1892 Uppsala, Sweden
- Died: 14 September 1981 (aged 88) Solna, Sweden
- Position: Goaltender
- National team: Sweden
- Playing career: 1919–1920

Seth Simon Oscar Howander (6 October 1892 – 14 September 1981) was a Swedish ice hockey, bandy and football player who competed in the 1920 Summer Olympics.

In 1920, he was a member of the Swedish ice hockey team which finished fourth in the Summer Olympics tournament. He played five matches as goaltender. Ice hockey didn't exist in Sweden at the time, so Howander and the other Swedish players were bandy players.
