= Birger Holmqvist =

Swedish ice hockey player and bandy player

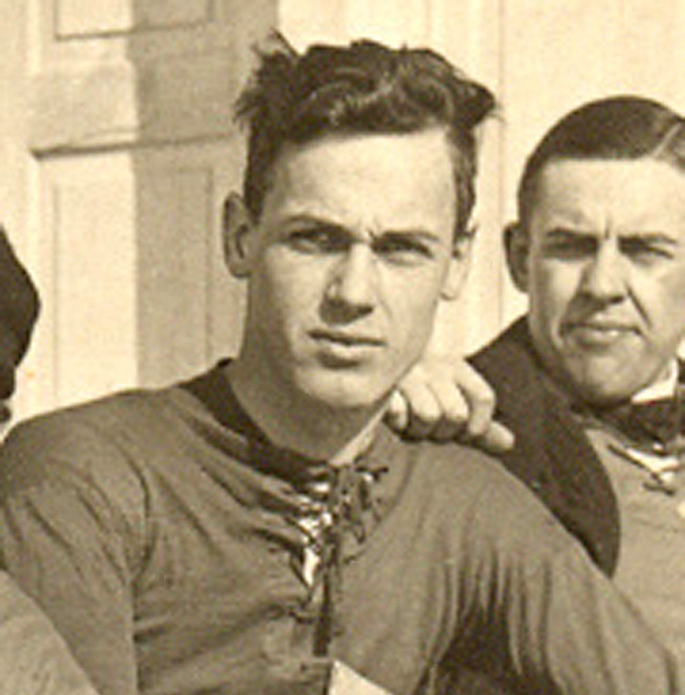

Personal information
- Born: 28 December 1900 Stockholm, Sweden
- Died: 9 April 1989 (aged 88) Bromma, Stockholm, Sweden

Sport
- Sport: Ice hockey
- Club: Kronobergs IK (1920–21); IK Göta, Bromma (1921–28)
- Retired: 1928
Medal record
Representing Sweden
Olympic Games
Silver medal – second place	1928 St. Moritz	Team
European Championships
Gold medal – first place	1923 Antwerpen	Team
Silver medal – second place	1924 Chamonix	Team

Birger Ivar "Bigge" Holmqvist (28 December 1900 – 9 April 1989) was a Swedish ice hockey and bandy player. He competed in the 1924 and 1928 Winter Olympics and won a silver medal in 1928. His team finished fourth in 1924, but he was named the best European player of the tournament. Between 1922 and 1928 Holmqvist played 30 international matches and scored 30 goals.

Holmqvist won Swedish ice hockey titles in 1922, 1924, 1927 and 1928 and bandy titles in 1925 and 1927 with IK Göta. Between 1921 and 1926 he also played for Berliner SC and won the 1924 Spengler Cup and German titles in 1921 and 1923–26.
