= Division 1 (bandy) =

Men's bandy league in Sweden

- Sport: Bandy
- Founded: 1931
- No. of teams: 60 (in six groups)
- Country: Sweden
- Most recent champion(s): -

Division 1 is the third level in the league system of bandy in Sweden and comprises 60 Swedish bandy teams in six groups. The level was founded in 1931 as Sweden's first level, and became the second from the 1981/1982 season and the third from the 2007/2008.

== Season structure ==
The season consist of six groups with ten teams each. Each team plays against the other twice, resulting in 18 rounds. The first two teams in each group qualifies for a play-off round robin tournament against the last teams of Allsvenskan. The last team in each group is relegated to the Division 2.
