= List of Swedish bandy championship finals (2000–present) =

The Swedish bandy championship final is a yearly event concluding the bandy season in Sweden and deciding the Swedish bandy champions.

From 1907 to 1930, the finalists were decided from a cup tournament and from 1931 the finalists have been decided from a play-off tournament of the top-tier of the Swedish bandy league system.

The first final was held in 1907, when IFK Uppsala beat IFK Gävle with 4–1 in Boulognerskogen, Gävle.

In 1912, two winners were declared, because no replay of the tied final could be played due to the weather.

Below is a list of finals since 2000.

== 2000 ==
19 March 2000

Sandvikens AIK	8–5	Hammarby IF
Södergren (3); Muhrén (2); Andersson; Eriksson; Hagberg	Report	Claesson (2); Sandell; Murling o.g.

Studenternas IP, Uppsala
Attendance: 21,503
Referee: Thomas Nordin

Sandvikens AIK
(Sweden) Daniel Kjörling	GK
(Sweden) Andreas Müller	GK
(Sweden) Patrik Mattson
(Sweden) Jonas Gustafsson
(Sweden) Niklas Spångberg
(Sweden) Stefan Andersson	(1)
(Sweden) Stefan Söderholm
(Sweden) Magnus Muhrén	(2)
(Sweden) Daniel Eriksson	(1)
(Sweden) Daniel Mossberg
(Sweden) Rickard Koch
(Sweden) Pär Gustafsson
(Sweden) Henrik Hagberg	(1)
(Sweden) Patrik Södergren	(3)

Hammarby IF
(Sweden) Dennis Gustafsson	GK
(Sweden) Mikael Sund	GK
(Sweden) Per Gustafsson
(Sweden) Göran Rosendahl
(Sweden) Jonas Claesson	(2)
(Sweden) Stefan Persson
(Sweden) Jonas Holgersson
(Sweden) Andreas Lindström
(Sweden) Daniel Liw
(Sweden) Mikael Dahlsten
(Sweden) Marcus Bergwall
(Sweden) Patrik Sandell	(1)
(Sweden) Patrik Murling	(1)
(Sweden) Mikael Larsson

== 2001 ==
18 March 2001

Västerås SK	4–3	Hammarby IF
Östling (2); Carlsson (2)	Report	Claesson (2); Liw

Studenternas IP, Uppsala
Attendance: 21,542
Referee: Håkan Nystedt

Västerås SK
(Sweden) Andreas Bergwall	GK
(Sweden) Johan Persson	GK
(Sweden) Ted Andersson
(Sweden) Göran Boström
(Sweden) Anders Hedlund
(Sweden) Mattias Larsson
(Sweden) Daniel Svedberg
(Sweden) Anders Östling	(2)
(Sweden) Mats Wetterqvist
(Sweden) Pierre Roos
(Sweden) Lars Gustafsson
(Sweden) Johan Geijbert
(Sweden) Michael Carlsson	(2)
(Sweden) Pelle Fosshaug
(Sweden) Johan Östblom

Hammarby IF
(Sweden) Dennis Gustafsson	GK
(Sweden) Lars Kylberg	GK
(Sweden) Göran Rosendahl
(Sweden) Jonas Claesson	(2)
(Sweden) Stefan Persson
(Sweden) Jonas Holgersson
(Sweden) Andreas Lindström
(Sweden) Daniel Liw	(1)
(Sweden) Mikael Dahlsten
(Sweden) Marcus Bergwall
(Sweden) Patrik Sandell
(Sweden) Patrik Murling
(Sweden) Björn Einarsson
(Sweden) Mikael Larsson

== 2002 ==
17 March 2002

Sandvikens AIK	8–4	Västerås SK
Muhrén (3); J. Gustafsson; Söderholm; Eriksson; Mossberg; Nilsson	Report	Carlsson (4)

Studenternas IP, Uppsala
Attendance: 21,612
Referee: Håkan Sjösten

Sandvikens AIK
(Sweden) Daniel Kjörling	GK
(Sweden) Andreas Müller	GK
(Sweden) Patrik Mattson
(Sweden) Johan Brodin
(Sweden) Jonas Gustafsson		(1)
(Sweden) Niklas Spångberg
(Sweden) Stefan Andersson
(Sweden) Stefan Söderholm		(1)
(Sweden) Magnus Muhrén		(3)
(Sweden) Daniel Eriksson		(1)
(Sweden) Daniel Mossberg		(1)
(Sweden) Patrik Nilsson		(1)
(Sweden) Pär Gustafsson
(Sweden) Henrik Hagberg
(Sweden) Patrik Södergren

Västerås SK
(Sweden) Andreas Bergwall	GK
(Sweden) Johan Persson	GK
(Sweden) Ted Andersson
(Sweden) Johan Olsson
(Sweden) Anders Hedlund
(Sweden) Patrik Anderbro
(Sweden) Anders Östling
(Sweden) Mats Wetterqvist
(Sweden) Pierre Roos
(Sweden) Lars Gustafsson
(Sweden) Johan Geijbert
(Sweden) Michael Carlsson	(4)
(Sweden) Pelle Fosshaug
(Finland) Jarno Väkiparta

== 2003 ==
16 March 2003

Sandvikens AIK	6–4	Hammarby IF
P. Nilsson (2); Björkman; Muhrén; Mossberg; Hagberg	Report	O. Jonsson; Rosendahl; Persson; Sandell

Studenternas IP, Uppsala
Attendance: 21,804
Referee: Stefan Lisell

Sandvikens AIK
(Sweden) Daniel Kjörling	GK
(Sweden) Andreas Müller	GK
(Sweden) Patrik Mattson
(Sweden) Mikael Nilsson
(Sweden) Niklas Spångberg
(Sweden) Stefan Andersson
(Sweden) Stefan Söderholm
(Sweden) Gustaf Björkman	(1)
(Sweden) Magnus Muhrén	(1)
(Sweden) Daniel Eriksson
(Sweden) Daniel Mossberg	(1)
(Sweden) Patrik Nilsson	(2)
(Sweden) Pär Gustafsson
(Sweden) Henrik Hagberg	(1)
(Sweden) Patrik Södergren

Hammarby IF
(Sweden) Andreas Bomark	GK
(Sweden) Dennis Gustafsson	GK
(Sweden) Stefan Jonsson
(Sweden) Oscar Jonsson	(1)
(Sweden) Göran Rosendahl	(1)
(Sweden) Stefan Persson	(1)
(Sweden) Jonas Holgersson
(Sweden) Andreas Lindström
(Sweden) Stefan Erixon
(Sweden) Kalle Spjuth
(Sweden) Jesper Eriksson
(Sweden) Patrik Sandell	(1)
(Sweden) David Karlsson
(Sweden) Mikael Larsson
(Sweden) Rickard Koch

== 2004 ==
21 March 2004

Edsbyns IF	7–6	Hammarby IF
Edling (3); Rönnkvist (2); Andersson; Törnberg	Report	Karlsson (2); Sandell (2); Rosendahl; Eskhult

Studenternas IP, Uppsala
Attendance: 22,753
Referee: Jonas Sundelius

Edsbyns IF
(Sweden) Anders Svensson	GK
(Sweden) Lucas Lund	GK
(Finland) Petteri Lampinen
(Sweden) Per Hellmyrs
(Sweden) Stefan Söderholm
(Sweden) Hans Andersson	(1)
(Sweden) Patrik Rönnkvist	(2)
(Sweden) Daniel Liw
(Russia) Nikolay Yarovich
(Finland) Kimmo Huotelin
(Sweden) Magnus Olsson
(Sweden) Jonas Edling	(3)
(Sweden) Daniel Välitalo
(Sweden) Peter Törnberg	(1)

Hammarby IF
(Sweden) Andreas Bomark	GK
(Sweden) Jonas Svensson	GK
(Sweden) Stefan Jonsson
(Sweden) Oscar Jonsson
(Sweden) Göran Rosendahl	(1)
(Sweden) Stefan Persson
(Sweden) Andreas Eskhult	(1)
(Sweden) Stefan Erixon
(Sweden) Lars Johansson
(Sweden) Patrik Sandell	(2)
(Norway) Christian Waaler
(Sweden) David Karlsson	(2)
(Sweden) Mikael Larsson
(Sweden) Rickard Koch

== 2005 ==
20 March 2005

Edsbyns IF	6–4	Sandvikens AIK
Hedqvist (2); Rönnqvist; Liw; Huotelin; Edling	Report	Andersson (2); Muhrén (2)

Studenternas IP, Uppsala
Attendance: 22,952
Referee: Jonas Hovlund

Edsbyns IF
(Sweden) Anders Svensson	GK
(Sweden) Lucas Lund	GK
(Finland) Petteri Lampinen
(Sweden) Per Hellmyrs
(Sweden) Fredrik Åström
(Sweden) Jens Hermansson
(Sweden) Hans Andersson
(Sweden) Patrik Rönnqvist	(1)
(Sweden) Daniel Liw	(1)
(Finland) Kimmo Huotelin	(1)
(Sweden) Magnus Olsson
(Sweden) Jonas Edling	(1)
(Sweden) Joakim Hedqvist	(2)
(Sweden) Daniel Välitalo
(Sweden) Peter Törnberg

Sandvikens AIK
(Sweden) Joel Othén	GK
(Sweden) Gabriel Bridholm	GK
(Sweden) Patrik Mattson
(Sweden) Andreas Westh
(Sweden) Niklas Spångberg
(Sweden) Stefan Andersson	(2)
(Sweden) Stefan Söderholm
(Sweden) Gustaf Björkman
(Sweden) Daniel Berlin
(Sweden) Magnus Muhrén	(2)
(Sweden) Daniel Eriksson
(Sweden) Daniel Mossberg
(Sweden) Patrik Nilsson
(Sweden) Henrik Hagberg
(Sweden) Pelle Fosshaug

== 2006 ==
19 March 2006

Edsbyns IF	6–2	Hammarby IF
Hedqvist (2); Hellmyrs; Rönnqvist; Edling; D. Andersson	Report	Spjuth; D. Karlsson

Studenternas IP, Uppsala
Attendance: 23,048
Referee: Tomas Nordin

Edsbyns IF
(Sweden) Anders Svensson	GK
(Sweden) Lucas Lund	GK
(Finland) Petteri Lampinen
(Sweden) Per Hellmyrs	(1)
(Sweden) Hans Andersson
(Sweden) Patrik Rönnqvist	(1)
(Sweden) Daniel Liw
(Finland) Kimmo Huotelin
(Sweden) Magnus Olsson
(Sweden) Jonas Edling	(1)
(Sweden) Daniel Andersson	(1)
(Sweden) Andreas Söderholm
(Sweden) Joakim Hedqvist	(2)
(Sweden) Daniel Välitalo
(Sweden) Peter Törnberg

Hammarby IF
(Sweden) Andreas Bergwall	GK
(Sweden) Jonas Svensson	GK
(Sweden) Olov Englund
(Sweden) Stefan Jonsson
(Sweden) Oscar Jonsson
(Sweden) Göran Rosendahl
(Sweden) Marcus Bergwall
(Sweden) Andreas Eskhult
(Sweden) Stefan Erixon
(Sweden) Kalle Spjuth	(1)
(Sweden) Jesper Eriksson
(Norway) Christian Waaler
(Sweden) David Karlsson	(1)
(Sweden) Rickard Koch
(Sweden) Linus Karlsson

== 2007 ==
18 March 2007

Edsbyns IF	4–3 (a.e.t.)	Hammarby IF
Olsson; Edling; Pär Törnberg; Hedqvist	Report	M. Bergwall; Spjuth; Eriksson

Studenternas IP, Uppsala
Attendance: 21,576
Referee: Håkan Nystedt

Edsbyns IF
(Sweden) Anders Svensson	GK
(Sweden) Lucas Lund	GK
(Finland) Petteri Lampinen
(Sweden) Per Hellmyrs
(Sweden) Fredrik Åström
(Sweden) Daniel Jonsson
(Sweden) Hans Andersson
(Sweden) Hans Åström
(Sweden) Magnus Olsson	(1)
(Sweden) Jonas Edling	(1)
(Sweden) Andreas Söderholm
(Sweden) Pär Törnberg	(1)
(Sweden) Joakim Hedqvist	(1)
(Sweden) Daniel Välitalo
(Sweden) Peter Törnberg

Hammarby IF
(Sweden) Andreas Bergwall	GK
(Sweden) Patrik Nordgaard	GK
(Sweden) Olov Englund
(Sweden) Oscar Jonsson
(Sweden) Stefan Persson
(Sweden) Marcus Bergwall	(1)
(Sweden) Andreas Eskhult
(Sweden) Stefan Erixon
(Sweden) Martin Röing
(Sweden) Kalle Spjuth	(1)
(Sweden) Jesper Eriksson	(1)
(Sweden) Robin Sundin
(Sweden) Rickard Koch
(Sweden) Viktor Karlsson
(Sweden) Gustav Björkman

== 2008 ==
15 March 2008

Edsbyns IF	11–6	Sandvikens AIK
Liw (3); Hedqvist (3); Hammarström (2); Edling (2); Peter Törnberg	Report	Nilsson (3); Mohlén; Andersson; Hagberg

Studenternas IP, Uppsala
Attendance: 19,513
Referee: Peter Öhrlund

Edsbyns IF
(Sweden) Anders Svensson	GK
(Sweden) Lucas Lund	GK
(Sweden) Fredrik Åström
(Sweden) Daniel Jonsson
(Sweden) Hans Andersson
(Sweden) Daniel Liw	(3)
(Finland) Kimmo Huotelin
(Sweden) Magnus Olsson
(Sweden) Mattias Hammarström	(2)
(Sweden) Jonas Edling	(2)
(Sweden) Mattias Andersson
(Sweden) Pär Törnberg
(Sweden) Joakim Hedqvist	(3)
(Sweden) Daniel Välitalo
(Sweden) Peter Törnberg	(1)

Sandvikens AIK
(Sweden) Joel Othén	GK
(Sweden) Patrik Kaemmerle	GK
(Sweden) Linus Pettersson
(Sweden) Robin Mohlén	(1)
(Sweden) Stefan Andersson	(1)
(Sweden) Stefan Söderholm
(Kazakhstan) Aleksandr Dryagin
(Sweden) Magnus Muhrén
(Sweden) Daniel Eriksson
(Sweden) Henrik Hagberg	(1)
(Sweden) Patrik Nilsson	(3)
(Sweden) Linus Forslund
(Sweden) Daniel Eriksson
(Finland) Mikko Aarni
(Sweden) Daniel Berlin

== 2009 ==
21 March 2009

Västerås SK	5–4	Edsbyns IF
Nilsson (2); Anderbro (2); Holmberg	Report	Edling (2); Mickelsson; Pär Törnberg

Studenternas IP, Uppsala
Attendance: 20,114
Referee: Mikael Karlsson

Västerås SK
(Sweden) Daniel Kjörling	GK
(Sweden) Kalle Samuelsson	GK
(Sweden) Stefan Edberg
(Sweden) Ted Andersson
(Sweden) Anders Bruun
(Sweden) Magnus Joneby
(Sweden) Tobias Holmberg	(1)
(Sweden) Jonas Nilsson	(2)
(Sweden) Patrik Anderbro	(2)
(Sweden) Oscar Gröhn
(Sweden) Oskar Robertsson
(Sweden) Johan Geibert
(Sweden) Victor Engström
(Sweden) Michael Carlsson
(Sweden) Klas Nordström
(Sweden) Kim Barklund

Edsbyns IF
(Sweden) Anders Svensson	GK
(Sweden) Lucas Lund	GK
(Sweden) Daniel Skarps
(Sweden) Per Hellmyrs
(Sweden) Fredrik Åström
(Sweden) Alexander Sundström
(Sweden) Hans Andersson
(Sweden) Daniel Liw
(Sweden) Magnus Olsson
(Sweden) Jonas Edling	(2)
(Sweden) Christian Mickelsson	(1)
(Sweden) Pär Törnberg	(1)
(Sweden) Joakim Svensk
(Sweden) Joakim Hedqvist
(Sweden) Daniel Välitalo
(Sweden) Peter Törnberg

== 2010 ==
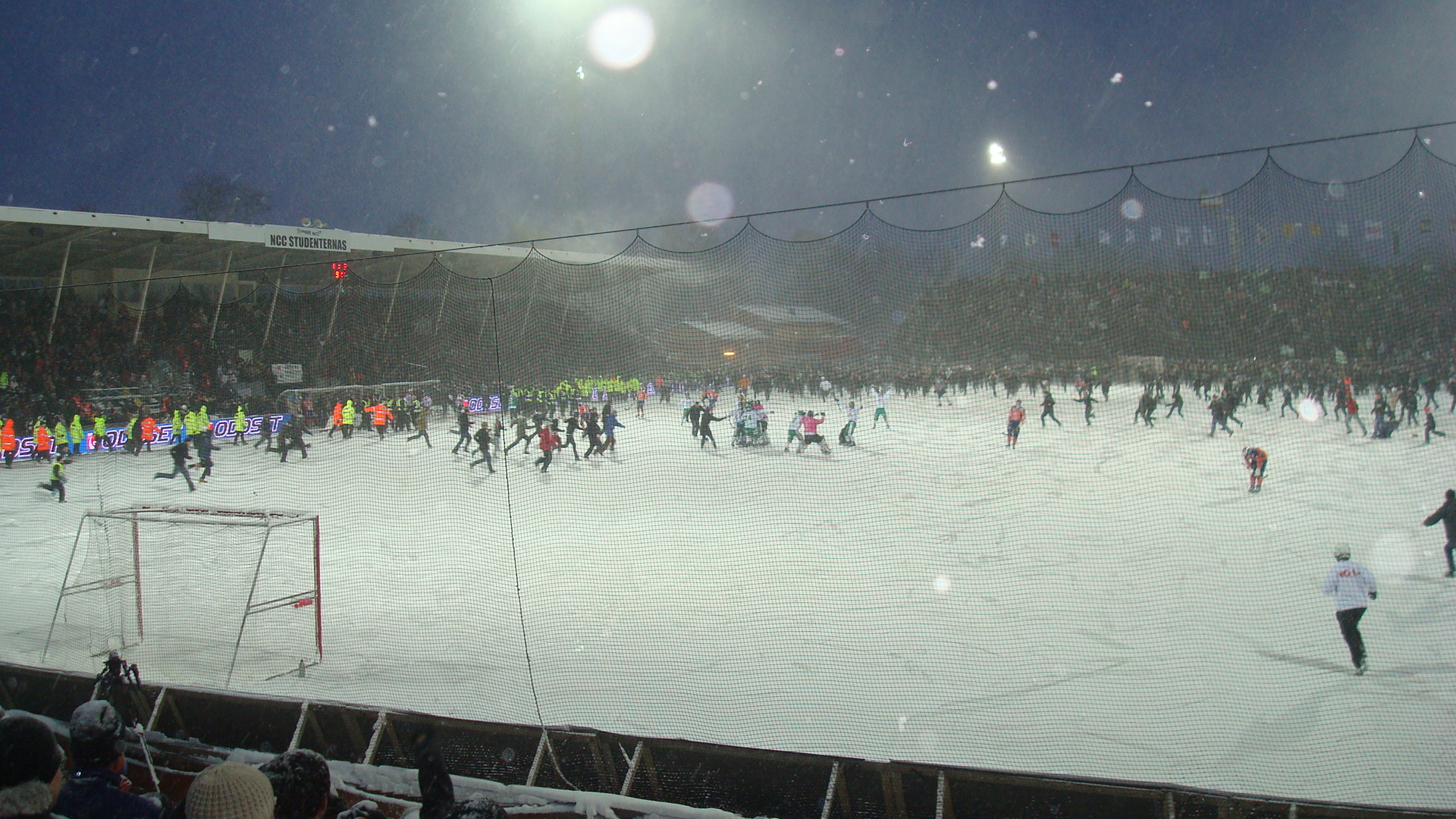
Hammarby IF players and fans celebrating the win of the 2010 final against Bollnäs GIF.

Hammarby IF won their first Swedish title after six final losses since 2000 by defeating Bollnäs GIF with 3–1 in a match played with three periods of 30 minutes instead of the normal two halves of 45 minutes due to heavy snow.

21 March 2010

Hammarby IF	3–1	Bollnäs GIF
Östblom; Erixon; Sundin	Report	Aaltonen

Studenternas IP, Uppsala
Attendance: 25,560
Referee: Peter Öhrlund

Hammarby IF
(Sweden) Patrik Hedberg	GK
(Sweden) Patrik Nordgaard	GK
(Sweden) Olov Englund
(Sweden) Johan Östblom	(1)
(Sweden) Ulf Einarsson
(Sweden) Stefan Erixon	(1)
(Sweden) David Pizzoni Elfving
(Sweden) Lars Johansson
(Sweden) Robin Sundin	(1)
(Sweden) Robert Rimgård
(Sweden) Patrik Nilsson
(Sweden) David Karlsson
(Sweden) Rickard Koch
(Sweden) Willy Johansson
(Sweden) Jesper Eriksson

Bollnäs GIF
(Finland) Timo Oksanen	GK
(Sweden) Henrik Rehnvall	GK
(Sweden) Per Hellmyrs
(Sweden) Andreas Westh
(Sweden) Markus Ståhl
(Sweden) Patrik Larsson
(Sweden) Johan Berglund
(Sweden) Joel Wigren
(Sweden) Anders Spinnars
(Finland) Juho Liukkonen
(Sweden) Jimmy Lindgren
(Finland) Ville Aaltonen	(1)
(Sweden) Pär Törnberg
(Sweden) Linus Forslund
(Finland) Mikko Lukkarila
(Sweden) Markus Wikman

== 2011 ==
20 March 2011

Sandvikens AIK	6–5 (a.e.t.)	Bollnäs GIF
Edlund (2); Berlin; Eriksson; Sveshnikov; Aarni	Report	Hellmyrs (2); Forslund (2); Spinnars

Studenternas IP, Uppsala
Attendance: 19,117
Referee: Håkan Sjösten

Sandvikens AIK
(Sweden) Joel Othén	GK
(Sweden) Johan Wikgren	GK
(Sweden) Joakim Bergman
(Sweden) Daniel Berlin	(1)
(Sweden) Erik Säfström
(Sweden) David Brodén
(Sweden) Linus Pettersson
(Sweden) Daniel Mossberg
(Sweden) Daniel Bäck
(Sweden) Christoffer Edlund	(2)
(Sweden) Ted Haraldsson
(Sweden) Mikael Nilsson
(Sweden) Rasmus Forslund
(Sweden) Daniel Eriksson	(1)
(Russia) Mikhail Sveshnikov	(1)
(Finland) Mikko Aarni	(1)

Bollnäs GIF
(Finland) Timo Oksanen	GK
(Sweden) Henrik Rehnvall	GK
(Sweden) Per Hellmyrs	(2)
(Sweden) Andreas Westh
(Sweden) Jesper Olsson
(Sweden) Johan Berglund
(Sweden) Joel Wigren
(Sweden) Anders Spinnars	(1)
(Finland) Juho Liukkonen
(Sweden) Jimmy Lindgren
(Finland) Ville Aaltonen
(Sweden) Pär Törnberg
(Sweden) Daniel Skarps
(Sweden) Linus Forslund	(2)
(Finland) Mikko Lukkarila
(Sweden) Markus Wikman

== 2012 ==
25 March 2012

Sandvikens AIK	6–5	Villa Lidköping BK
Edlund (3); Löfstedt; Nilsson; Berlin	Report	Karlsson (2); Gustafsson; Bryngelson; Andersson

Studenternas IP, Uppsala
Attendance: 19,646
Referee: Jonas Kandell

Sandvikens AIK
(Sweden) Joel Othén	GK
(Sweden) Abbe Bodin	GK
(Sweden) Joakim Bergman
(Sweden) Jesper Hvornum
(Sweden) Erik Säfström
(Sweden) Johan Löfstedt	(1)
(Sweden) Linus Pettersson
(Sweden) Daniel Bäck
(Sweden) Christoffer Edlund	(3)
(Sweden) Ted Haraldsson
(Sweden) Mikael Nilsson	(1)
(Sweden) Rasmus Forslund
(Sweden) Linus Forslund
(Finland) Mikko Aarni
(Sweden) Erik Pettersson
(Sweden) Daniel Berlin	(1)

Villa Lidköping BK
(Sweden) Martin Berggren	GK
(Sweden) Joakim Bergqvist	GK
(Sweden) Patrik Hellman
(Sweden) Daniel Skoog
(Sweden) Linus Rönnqvist
(Sweden) Patrik Gustafsson	(1)
(Sweden) David Karlsson	(2)
(Sweden) Simon Artig
(Sweden) Tim Persson
(Sweden) Henrik Larsson
(Sweden) Jesper Bryngelson	(1)
(Sweden) Martin Johansson
(Sweden) Johan Malmqvist
(Sweden) Erik Olovsson
(Sweden) Daniel Andersson	(1)
(Sweden) Petter Björling

== 2013 ==
17 March 2013

Hammarby IF	9–4	Sandvikens AIK
Pizzoni Elfving (2); Spjuth (2); Gilljam (2); Englund; Erixon; Sundin	Report	Edlund (3); Pettersson

Friends Arena, Solna
Attendance: 38,474
Referee: Peter Öhrlund

Hammarby IF
(Sweden) Andreas Bergwall	GK
(Sweden) Patrik Hedberg	GK
(Sweden) Olov Englund	(1)
(Sweden) Robert Rimgård
(Sweden) Per Einarsson
(Sweden) Ulf Einarsson
(Sweden) Stefan Erixon	(1)
(Sweden) David Pizzoni Elfving	(2)
(Sweden) Anders Persson
(Sweden) Robin Sundin	(1)
(Sweden) Kalle Spjuth	(2)
(Sweden) Martin Deacon
(Sweden) Jonas Enander
(Sweden) Carl-Johan Rutqvist
(Sweden) Adam Gilljam	(2)
(Kazakhstan) Misha Pashkin

Sandvikens AIK
(Sweden) Joel Othén	GK
(Sweden) Abbe Bodin	GK
(Sweden) Joakim Bergman
(Sweden) Johan Östblom
(Sweden) Victors Janérs
(Sweden) Erik Säfström
(Sweden) Johan Löfstedt
(Sweden) Daniel Bäck
(Sweden) Christoffer Edlund	(3)
(Sweden) Dennis Henriksen
(Sweden) Ted Haraldsson
(Sweden) Mikael Nilsson
(Sweden) Rasmus Forslund
(Sweden) Linus Forslund
(Sweden) Jesper Hvornum
(Sweden) Erik Pettersson	(1)

== 2014 ==
16 March 2014

Sandvikens AIK	5–4	Västerås SK
Muhrén (2); Pettersson (2); Edlund	Report	Nilsson (2); Gröhn; Esplund

Friends Arena, Solna
Attendance: 20,497
Referee: Peter Öhrlund

Sandvikens AIK
(Sweden) Abbe Bodin	GK
(Sweden) Martin Falk	GK
(Sweden) Joakim Bergman
(Sweden) Johan Östblom
(Sweden) Victor Janérs
(Sweden) Olle Berglund
(Sweden) Magnus Muhrén	(2)
(Sweden) Daniel Bäck
(Sweden) Christoffer Edlund	(1)
(Sweden) Dennis Henriksen
(Sweden) Ted Haraldsson
(Sweden) Rasmus Forslund
(Sweden) Linus Forslund
(Sweden) Stefan Söderholm
(Sweden) Erik Pettersson	(2)
(Sweden) Erik Säfström

Västerås SK
(Sweden) Andreas Bergwall	GK
(Sweden) Henrik Kjellsson	GK
(Sweden) William Lövstedt
(Sweden) Tobias Holmberg
(Sweden) Jonas Nilsson	(2)
(Sweden) Ted Bergström
(Sweden) Jesper Hermansson
(Sweden) Patrik Sjöström
(Sweden) Oscar Gröhn	(1)
(Sweden) Oskar Magnusson
(Sweden) Mikael Olsson
(Sweden) Aksel Ekblom
(Finland) Pekka Rintala
(Sweden) Janne Rintala
(Sweden) Johan Esplund	(1)
(Sweden) Magnus Joneby

== 2015 ==
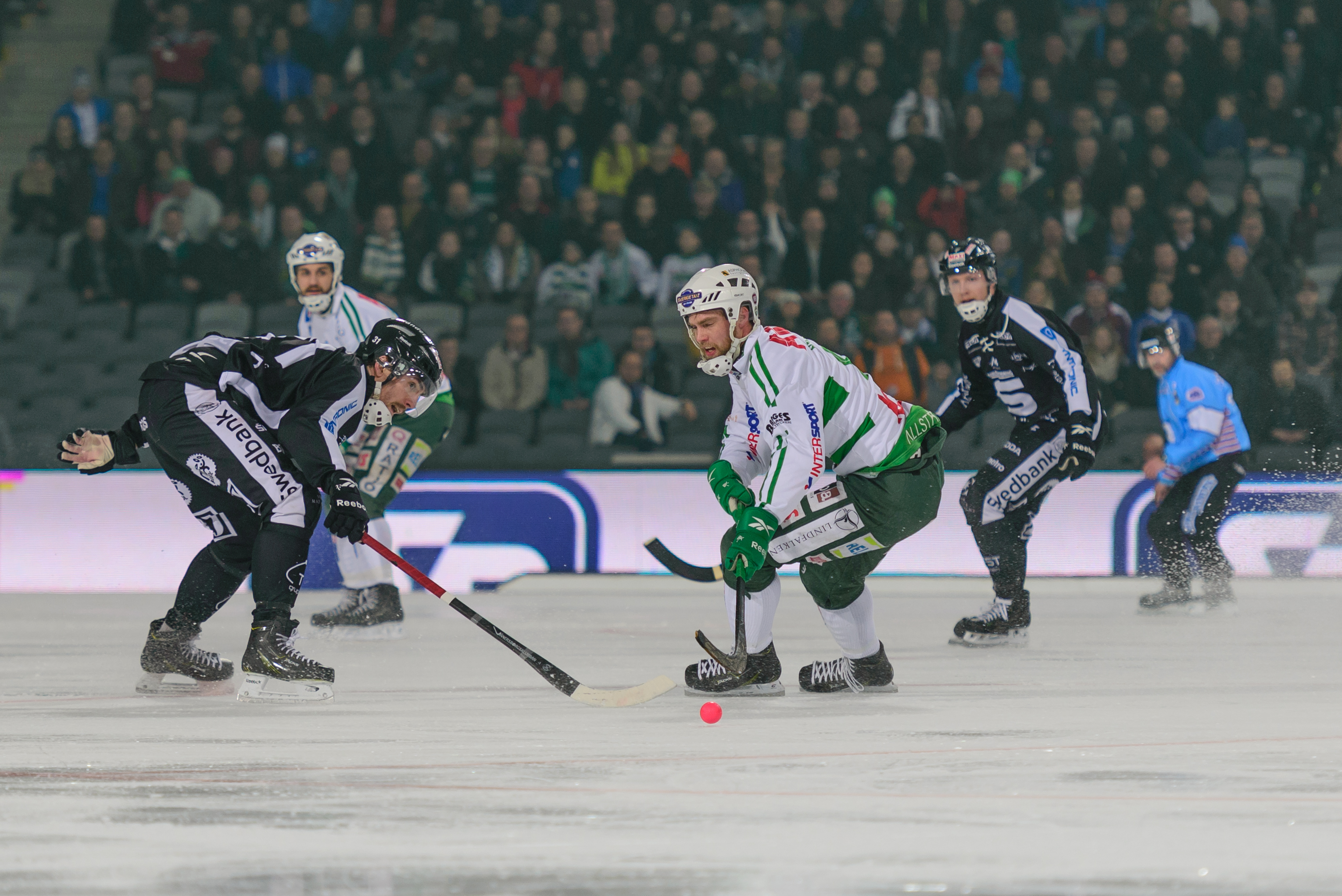
The 2010 final saw Västerås SK (white and green) against Sandvikens AIK (black).

14 March 2015

Västerås SK	6–4	Sandvikens AIK
Nilsson (3); Holmberg; Olsson; Rintala	Report	Säfström (2); P. Nilsson (2)

Tele2 Arena, Stockholm
Attendance: 15,877
Referee: Mikael Karlsson (Grästorp)

Västerås SK
(Sweden) Andreas Bergwall	GK
(Sweden) Henrik Kjellson	GK
(Sweden) Stefan Edberg
(Sweden) Anders Bruun
(Sweden) Magnus Joneby
(Sweden) Tobias Holmberg	(1)
(Sweden) Jonas Nilsson	(3)
(Sweden) Ted Bergström
(Sweden) Patrik Sjöström
(Sweden) Oscar Gröhn
(Sweden) Jesper Norrman
(Sweden) Mikael Olsson	(1)
(Sweden) Simon Folkesson
(Sweden) Emil Juhlén
(Sweden) Janne Rintala	(1)
(Sweden) Johan Esplund

Sandvikens AIK
(Sweden) Abbe Bodin	GK
(Sweden) Martin Falk	GK
(Sweden) Joakim Bergman
(Sweden) Niklas Gälman
(Sweden) Erik Säfström	(2)
(Sweden) Olle Berglund
(Sweden) Linus Pettersson
(Sweden) Daniel Mossberg
(Sweden) Patrik Nilsson	(2)
(Sweden) Daniel Bäck
(Sweden) Dennis Henriksen
(Sweden) Ted Haraldsson
(Sweden) Mikael Nilsson
(Sweden) Rasmus Forslund
(Sweden) Linus Forslund
(Sweden) Erik Pettersson

== 2016 ==
19 March 2016

Västerås SK	5–2	Villa Lidköping BK
Jansson; Holmberg; Bergström; Sjöström; Gröhn	Report	D. Karlsson; Esplund

Tele2 Arena, Stockholm
Attendance: 15,748
Referee: Roland Fager

Västerås SK
(Sweden) Stefan Edberg
(Sweden) Anders Bruun
(Sweden) Magnus Joneby
(Sweden) Simon Jansson	(1)
(Sweden) Jacob Bucht
(Sweden) Tobias Holmberg	(1)
(Sweden) Jonas Nilsson
(Sweden) Ted Bergström	(1)
(Sweden) Andreas Bergwall	GK
(Sweden) Patrik Sjöström	(1)
(Sweden) Oscar Gröhn	(1)
(Sweden) Jesper Norrman
(Sweden) Mikael Olsson
(Sweden) Filip Mörkdahl	GK
(Sweden) Simon Folkesson
(Sweden) Emil Juhlen

Villa Lidköping BK
(Sweden) Martin Karlsson
(Sweden) Lars Fall
(Sweden) Ludvig Johansson
(Sweden) David Karlsson	(1)
(Sweden) Tobias Backman
(Sweden) Magnus Muhrén
(Sweden) Mattias Johansson
(Sweden) Martin Andreasson
(Sweden) Martin Johansson
(Sweden) Johan Malmquist
(Sweden) Jesper Eriksson
(Sweden) Jon Karlsson	GK
(Sweden) Daniel Andersson
(Sweden) Jesper Thimfors	GK
(Sweden) Johan Esplund	(1)
(Sweden) Petter Björling

== 2017 ==
25 March 2017

Edsbyns IF	3–1	Bollnäs GIF
Tuomas Määttä 4', 85'; Hammarström 84' (p)	Report	Wiik 19'

Tele2 Arena, Stockholm
Attendance: 16,836
Referee: Ulrik Bergman

Edsbyns IF
(Sweden) Anders Svensson	GK
(Sweden) Oscar Wikblad
(Sweden) Oscar Jonsson
(Sweden) Hans Andersson
(Sweden) Daniel Liw
(Sweden) Joel Edling
(Sweden) Joakim Svensk
(Sweden) Mattias Larsson
(Sweden) Martin Frid
(Sweden) Mattias Hammarström	(1)
(Sweden) Jonas Edling
(Sweden) Daniel Burvall-Jonsson
(Sweden) Daniel Välitalo
(Finland) Tommi Määttä
(Finland) Tuomas Määttä	(2)
(Sweden) Erik Persson	GK

Bollnäs GIF
(Sweden) Patrik Aihonen	GK
(Sweden) Jens Wiik	(1)
(Sweden) Per Hellmyrs
(Sweden) Andreas Westh
(Sweden) Marcus Ståhl
(Sweden) Daniel Berlin
(Finland) Samuli Helavouri
(Sweden) Caspher Ekström
(Sweden) Anders Spinnars
(Sweden) Patrik Nilsson
(Sweden) Christian Mickelsson
(Finland) Ville Aaltonen
(Sweden) Pär Törnberg
(Sweden) Oskar Olsson
(Sweden) Niklas Prytz	GK

== 2018 ==
17 March 2018
16:00 CET

Sandvikens AIK	0-4	Edsbyns IF

Studenternas IP, Uppsala

== See also ==
- List of Swedish bandy championship finals (1907–1949)
- List of Swedish bandy championship finals (1950–1999)
