= List of foreign Russian Bandy Super League players =

This is a list of foreign players in Russian Bandy Super League, which commenced play in 1992–93. The following players must meet both of the following two criteria:

1. have played at least one Elitserien game. Players who were signed by Russian Bandy Super League clubs, but only played in lower league, cup and/or European games, or did not play in any competitive games at all, are not included.
2. are considered foreign, determined by the following:

A player is considered foreign if he is not eligible to play for Russia national bandy team. (Note: More specifically, If a player has been capped on international level, the national team is used; if he has been capped by more than one country, the highest level (or the most recent) team is used.; If a player has not been capped on international level, his country of birth is used, except those who were born abroad from Russian parents or moved to Russia at a young age, and those who clearly indicated to have switched his nationality to another nation.; Clubs listed are those which the player has played at least one Russian Bandy Super League game for.)

Russian teams can have a maximum of three foreign players in their match squad.

== List of players ==
=== Finland ===
- Sami Laakkonen – Vodnik, Zorky, Dynamo Kazan – 2004–14
- Petteri Lampinen – Raketa, Zorky, Rodina – 2007–14
- Timo Oksanen

=== Sweden ===
- Andreas Bergwall – Dynamo Kazan – 2007–10, 2011–12
- Marcus Bergwall – Raketa, Dynamo Moscow – 2003–04, 2007–08
- Daniel Berlin – Dynamo Moscow – 2013–14
- Anders Bruun – Volga – 2013–14
- Michael Carlsson
- Christoffer Edlund – Yenisey – 2014–15
- Ulf Einarsson
- Olov Englund
- Jesper Ericsson
- Daniel Eriksson
- Stefan Erixon
- Andreas Eskhult
- Joakim Hedqvist
- Per Hellmyrs
- Hans Johansson
- David Karlsson
- Magnus Karlsson – Dynamo Kazan – 2013–14
- Daniel Liw
- Daniel Mossberg – Dynamo Moscow – 2011–14
- Magnus Muhrén – Zorky, Dynamo Moscow, Raketa – 2005–07
- Patrik Nilsson
- Johan Östblom
- Anders Östling
- Joel Othén – SKA-Neftyanik – 2013–16
- Erik Pettersson – Yenisey – 2017–18
- Linus Pettersson
- Martin Röing
- Kalle Spjuth
- Robin Sundin
- Anders Svensson – Dynamo Kazan, Volga – 2012–15

== See also ==
- List of Russian Bandy Super League players
- List of foreign Elitserien players
