= 2005 Bandy World Championship squads =

Below are the squads for the 2005 Bandy World Championship final tournament in Russia.

== Group A ==
=== Sweden ===
Coach: Kenth Hultqvist

No.	Pos.	Player	Date of birth (age)	Caps	Club
	GK	Andreas Bergwall			(Sweden) Vetlanda
	GK	Anders Svensson			(Sweden) Edsbyn
		Andreas Westh			(Sweden) Sandviken
		Marcus Bergwall			(Sweden) BolticGöta
		Daniel Eriksson			(Sweden) Sandviken
		Anders Östling			(Sweden) Västerås
		Per Hellmyrs			(Sweden) Edsbyn
		Stefan Söderholm			(Sweden) Sandviken
		Henrik Hagberg			(Sweden) Sandviken
		Stefan Erixon			(Sweden) Hammarby
		Daniel Liw			(Sweden) Edsbyn
		Jonas Holgersson			(Sweden) Hammarby
		Pelle Fosshaug			(Sweden) Sandviken
		Magnus Muhrén			(Sweden) Sandviken
		David Karlsson			(Sweden) Hammarby
		Johan Andersson			(Sweden) Villa Lidköping
