= 2009 Bandy World Championship squads =

Below are the squads for the 2003 Bandy World Championship final tournament in Sweden.

== Group A ==
=== Sweden ===
Coach: Anders Jakobsson

No.	Pos.	Player	Date of birth (age)	Caps	Club
	GK	Andreas Bergwall			(Russia) Dynamo Kazan
	GK	Anders Svensson			(Sweden) Edsbyn
		Olov Englund			(Sweden) Hammarby
		Per Hellmyrs			(Sweden) Edsbyn
		Andreas Westh			(Sweden) Bollnäs
		Daniel Berlin			(Sweden) Sandviken
		Marcus Bergwall			(Sweden) Vetlanda
		Stefan Erixon			(Sweden) Hammarby
		Anders Östling			(Russia) Dynamo Kazan
		Magnus Muhrén			(Sweden) Sandviken
		Daniel Välitalo			(Sweden) Edsbyn
		Joakim Hedqvist			(Sweden) Edsbyn
		Daniel Jonsson			(Sweden) Broberg/Söderhamn
		Daniel Mossberg			(Sweden) Sandviken
		Jonas Edling			(Sweden) Edsbyn
		Patrik Nilsson			(Russia) Dynamo Kazan
		Christoffer Edlund			(Sweden) Vetlanda
		Johan Andersson			(Russia) Dynamo Kazan
