= 2003 Bandy World Championship squads =

Below are the squads for the 2003 Bandy World Championship final tournament in Russia.

== Group A ==
=== Sweden ===
Coach: Kenth Hultqvist

No.	Pos.	Player	Date of birth (age)	Caps	Club
	GK	Andreas Bergwall			(Sweden) Västerås
	GK	Daniel Kjörling			(Sweden) Sandviken
		Daniel Eriksson			(Sweden) Sandviken
		Marcus Bergwall			(Sweden) BolticGöta
		Pär Gustafsson			(Sweden) Sandviken
		Göran Rosendahl			(Sweden) Hammarby
		Anders Östling			(Sweden) Västerås
		Pelle Fosshaug			(Sweden) Västerås
		Stefan Söderholm			(Sweden) Sandviken
		Michael Carlsson			(Sweden) Västerås
		Henrik Hagberg			(Sweden) Sandviken
		Andreas Lindström			(Sweden) Hammarby
		Magnus Muhrén			(Sweden) Sandviken
		Stefan Erixon			(Sweden) Hammarby
		Patrik Södergren			(Sweden) Sandviken
		Patrik Nilsson			(Sweden) Sandviken
