= 2012–13 Elitserien (bandy) =

2012–13 Elitserien season
- League: (Sweden) Elitserien
- Sport: Bandy
- Duration: 20 Oct 2012 – 17 Mar 2013
- Number of teams: 14
- TV partner(s): TV4 and TV4 Sport

Regular season
- League Champ.: Hammarby IF
- Runners-up: Villa Lidköping BK
- Top scorer: David Karlsson, Villa (65)

Final
- Champions: Hammarby IF
- Runners-up: Sandvikens AIK

Elitserien seasons
- ← 2011–2012 2013–2014 →

The 2012–2013 Elitserien was the sixth season of the Swedish bandy league Elitserien.

== League table ==
At the end of the season.

| Rank | Team | Pld | W | D | L | GF | GA | GD | Pts |
|---|---|---|---|---|---|---|---|---|---|
| 1 | Hammarby IF | 26 | 20 | 1 | 5 | 144 | 82 | 62 | 41 |
| 2 | Villa Lidköping BK | 26 | 18 | 2 | 6 | 176 | 103 | 73 | 38 |
| 3 | Sandvikens AIK | 26 | 17 | 2 | 7 | 163 | 111 | 52 | 36 |
| 4 | Edsbyns IF | 26 | 18 | 2 | 6 | 134 | 106 | 28 | 36 |
| 5 | Bollnäs GIF | 26 | 15 | 1 | 10 | 92 | 90 | 2 | 31 |
| 6 | Broberg/Söderhamn Bandy | 26 | 14 | 2 | 10 | 119 | 105 | 14 | 30 |
| 7 | IFK Vänersborg | 26 | 13 | 2 | 11 | 107 | 112 | –5 | 28 |
| 8 | Västerås SK | 26 | 10 | 4 | 12 | 119 | 133 | –14 | 24 |
| 9 | GAIS | 26 | 10 | 3 | 13 | 91 | 99 | –8 | 23 |
| 10 | IFK Kungälv | 26 | 9 | 4 | 13 | 98 | 104 | –6 | 22 |
| 11 | IK Sirius | 26 | 9 | 4 | 13 | 95 | 114 | –19 | 22 |
| 12 | Vetlanda BK | 26 | 9 | 2 | 15 | 80 | 108 | –28 | 20 |
| 13 | Ljusdals BK | 26 | 4 | 1 | 21 | 81 | 155 | –74 | 9 |
| 14 | IFK Motala | 26 | 2 | 0 | 24 | 75 | 152 | –77 | 4 |

=== Knock-out stage ===
A best-of-five playoff were used in the quarter-finals and semi-finals. The crucial final was played at Friends Arena in Solna, Stockholm at March 17, 2013.

Quarter-finals
1 | Hammarby IF | 3
6 | Broberg/Söderhamn Bandy | 0
4 | Edsbyns IF | 3
5 | Bollnäs GIF | 0
3 | Sandvikens AIK | 3
7 | IFK Vänersborg | 1
8 | Västerås SK | 0
2 | Villa Lidköping BK | 3

Semi-finals
1 | Hammarby IF | 3
4 | Edsbyns IF | 1
3 | Sandvikens AIK | 3
2 | Villa Lidköping BK | 2

Final
1 | Hammarby IF | 9
3 | Sandvikens AIK | 4

==== Final ====
17 March 2013
15.30 UTC+1

| Hammarby IF | 9 – 4 | Sandvikens AIK |
|---|---|---|
| Gilljam 3', 4'; Pizzoni Elfving 5', 71'; Erixon 11'; Spjuth 44', 86'; Sundin 80'; Englund 90+1' | Report | Edlund 14', 32', 68'; Pettersson 21' |

Friends Arena, Solna
Attendance: 38,474
Referee: Peter Öhrlund (Västerås)

== Season statistics ==
=== Top scorers ===
As of end of season.

| Rank | Player | Club | Goals |
|---|---|---|---|
| 1 | (Sweden) David Karlsson | Villa Lidköping BK | 65 |
| 2 | (Sweden) Daniel Andersson | Villa Lidköping BK | 42 |
| 3 | (Sweden) Christoffer Edlund | Sandvikens AIK | 40 |
| 4 | (Kazakhstan) Misha Pashkin | Hammarby IF | 39 |
| 5 | (Sweden) Erik Pettersson | Sandvikens AIK | 36 |
| 6 | (Sweden) Mattias Hammarström | Edsbyns IF | 35 |
| 7 | (Sweden) Joakim Hedqvist | IFK Vänersborg | 33 |
| 8 | (Sweden) Viktor Broberg | IK Sirius | 31 |
| 9 | (Sweden) Tobias Björklund | Ljusdals BK | 28 |
| 10 | (Sweden) Jonas Edling | Edsbyns IF | 26 |
