= 2009–10 Elitserien (bandy) =

2010–11 Elitserien season
- League: (Sweden) Elitserien
- Sport: Bandy
- Duration: 30 October 2009 – 21 March 2010
- Number of teams: 14

Regular season
- League Champions: Hammarby IF
- Runners-up: Sandvikens AIK
- Promoted to Allsvenskan: Tillberga, IF Boltic
- Relegated to Allsvenskan: Katrineholm Värmbol BS, Falu BS

Playoffs
- Finals champions: Hammarby IF
- Runners-up: Bollnäs GIF

Elitserien seasons
- ← 2008–2009 2010–2011 →

== League table ==
The regular season started 30 October 2009 and ended 19 February 2010.

Standings as of 15 February 2011

	Team	GP	W	T	L	GS	GA	P	+/-
1	Hammarby IF	26	19	4	3	178	101	42	+77
2	Sandvikens AIK	26	19	3	4	224	97	41	+127
3	Bollnäs GIF	26	14	6	6	142	73	34	+69
4	Villa Lidköping BK	26	15	3	8	144	105	33	+39
5	Edsbyns IF	26	14	4	8	150	105	32	+45
6	Västerås SK	26	14	2	10	149	111	30	+38
7	IK Sirius	26	13	4	9	107	99	30	+8
8	Broberg/Söderhamn Bandy	26	14	1	11	135	101	29	+34
9	Haparanda-Tornio PV	26	11	5	10	127	124	27	+3
10	Vetlanda BK	26	10	5	11	118	121	25	-3
11	IFK Vänersborg	26	10	1	15	103	138	21	-35
12	IFK Kungälv	26	8	0	18	83	152	16	-69
13	Falu BS	26	1	1	24	63	216	3	-153
14	Katrineholm Värmbol BS	26	0	1	25	69	249	1	-180

Teams 1–8 qualified to the playoffs, teams 9–10 qualified to the 2010-11 Elitserien, teams 11–12 played the second placed teams of each Allsvenskan to qualify to next season and teams 13–14 was relegated to Allsvenskan

=== Knock-out stage ===
The quarter and semi finals started 23 February and ended 16 March. The final was played 21 March 2010.

Quarter-finals
Hammarby IF	3 wins
IK Sirius	1 win
Villa Lidköping BK	3 wins
Edsbyns IF	1 win
Sandvikens AIK	3 wins
Västerås SK	1 win
Bollnäs GIF	3 wins
Broberg/Söderhamn Bandy	1 win

Semi-finals
Hammarby IF	3 wins
Villa Lidköping BK	0 wins
Bollnäs GIF	3 wins
Sandvikens AIK	2 wins

Final
Hammarby IF	3
Bollnäs GIF	1

==== Final ====
21 March 2010
15:45 UTC+1

Hammarby IF	3–1 (a.e.t.)	Bollnäs GIF
Östblom; Erixon; Sundin	Report	Aaltonen

Attendance: 25,560

== Season statistics ==
=== Top scorers ===
As of end of season.

Rank	Player	Club	Goals
1	(Sweden) Christoffer Edlund	Sandvikens AIK	91
2	(Sweden) Patrik Nilsson	Hammarby IF	54
2	(Sweden) David Karlsson	Hammarby IF	54
4	(Sweden) Magnus Muhrén	Sandvikens AIK	48
5	(Sweden) Joakim Hedqvist	Edsbyns IF	45
6	(Sweden) Daniel Andersson	Villa Lidköping BK	43
7	(Sweden) Jesper Bryngelson	Villa Lidköping BK	37
8	(Finland) Antti Ekman	HaparandaTornio BF	35
9	(Sweden) Jonas Nilsson	Västerås SK	34
10	(Sweden) Christian Mickelsson	IK Sirius	32
