= 2012 Bandy World Championship squads =

Below are the squads for the 2012 Bandy World Championship final tournament in Kazakhstan.

== Group A ==
=== Sweden ===
Coach: Franco Bergman

No.	Pos.	Player	Date of birth (age)	Caps	Club
	GK	Andreas Bergwall			(Russia) Dynamo Kazan
	GK	Anders Svensson			(Sweden) Edsbyn
		Olov Englund			(Sweden) Hammarby
		Per Hellmyrs			(Sweden) Bollnäs
		Andreas Westh			(Sweden) Bollnäs
		Daniel Berlin			(Sweden) Sandviken
		Hans Andersson			(Sweden) Edsbyn
		Johan Löfstedt			(Sweden) Sandviken
		Stefan Erixon			(Sweden) Hammarby
		Ted Bergström			(Sweden) Broberg
		Linus Pettersson			(Sweden) Sandviken
		Erik Säfström			(Sweden) Sandviken
		Daniel Mossberg			(Russia) Dynamo Moscow
		Jonas Edling			(Sweden) Edsbyn
		Christian Mickelsson			(Sweden) Sirius
		Daniel Välitalo			(Sweden) Edsbyn
		Daniel Andersson			(Sweden) Villa Lidköping
		Johan Esplund			(Russia) Zorky
