= 2008–09 Elitserien (bandy) =

2008–09 Elitserien season
- League: (Sweden) Elitserien
- Sport: Bandy
- Duration: October 2008 – March 2009
- Teams: 14

Regular season
- League Champions: Edsbyns IF
- Runners-up: Västerås SK
- Relegated to Allsvenskan: Gripen Trollhättan BK (after qualification-round); IFK Motala, Örebro SK

Playoffs
- Finals champions: Västerås SK
- Runners-up: Edsbyns IF

Elitserien seasons
- 2007–2008 2009–2010

Elitserien is the top-tier of bandy in Sweden since 2007. The second season was played October–March 2008–09.

== League table ==
Each team meet every other team twice during the season, so 26 rounds are played all in all.

The top eight teams went on to the quarter-finals in the play-off for the Swedish championship. Teams eleven and twelve had to play a qualifying round against teams from Allsvenskan to stay in Elitserien, while teams 13 and 14 were relegated without the possibility to re-qualify for Elitserien until next year.

Pos	Team	Pld	W	D	L	GF	GA	GD	Pts	
1	Edsbyns IF	26	22	2	2	187	76	+111	46	Advance to Knock-out stage
2	Västerås SK	26	19	3	4	139	74	+65	41	Advance to Knock-out stage
3	IK Sirius	26	18	2	6	117	93	+24	38	Advance to Knock-out stage
4	Sandvikens AIK	26	17	2	7	149	85	+64	36	Advance to Knock-out stage
5	Vetlanda BK	26	15	4	7	115	89	+26	34	Advance to Knock-out stage
6	Hammarby IF	26	15	2	9	135	106	+29	32	Advance to Knock-out stage
7	Broberg/Söderhamn	26	13	2	11	109	96	+13	28	Advance to Knock-out stage
8	IFK Vänersborg	26	10	4	12	102	95	+7	24	Advance to Knock-out stage
9	Bollnäs GIF	26	8	5	13	100	102	−2	21	
10	Villa Lidköping BK	26	8	2	16	96	135	−39	18	
11	IFK Kungälv	26	8	0	18	83	131	−48	16	Qualification to Relegation playoffs
12	Gripen Trollhättan BK	26	4	4	18	86	161	−75	12	Qualification to Relegation playoffs
13	IFK Motala	26	4	2	20	73	136	−63	10	Relegation to the Allsvenskan
14	Örebro SK	26	4	0	22	87	199	−112	8	Relegation to the Allsvenskan

Updated to match(es) played on completed. Source:

=== Knock-out stage ===
A best-of-three playoff were used in the quarter-finals and best-of-five in the semi-finals. The crucial final for the Swedish Championship was played at Studenternas IP in Uppsala on 21 March 2009.

Quarter-finals
Edsbyns IF	8	7
IFK Vänersborg	5	3
IK Sirius	2	2	5
Vetlanda BK	5	1	1
Västerås SK	5	8
Broberg/Söderhamn	1	0
Sandvikens AIK	10	5
Hammarby IF	4	4

Semi-finals
Edsbyns IF	3(4)	4(4)	7	7
IK Sirius	3(3)	4(5)	2	1
Västerås SK	1	4(5)	5	4	4
Sandvikens AIK	4	4(4)	3	7	3

Final
Edsbyns IF	4
Västerås SK	5

==== Final ====
21 March 2009
15:45 UTC+1

Edsbyns IF	4–5 (a.e.t.)	Västerås SK
Edling (2); Törnberg; Mickelson	Report	Anderbro (2); Nilsson (2); Holmberg

== Season statistics ==
=== Top scorers ===
As of end of season.

Rank	Player	Club	Goals
1	(Sweden) Magnus Muhrén	Sandvikens AIK	44
1	(Sweden) Christoffer Edlund	Vetlanda BK	44
3	(Sweden) Christian Mickelsson	Edsbyns IF	42
4	(Sweden) Tomas Knutson	Örebro SK	40
5	(Sweden) David Karlsson	Hammarby IF	37
6	(Sweden) Jesper Bryngelsson	Villa Lidköping BK	34
7	(Sweden) Alexander Mayborn	IK Sirius	27
7	(Kazakhstan) Misha Pashkin	Gripen Trollhättan BK	27
9	(Sweden) Patrik Anderbro	Västerås SK	25
9	(Sweden) Joakim Hedqvist	Edsbyns IF	25
9	(Sweden) Per-Johan Wikström	Broberg/Söderhamn Bandy	25
