= 2011–12 Elitserien (bandy) =

2011–12 Elitserien season
- League: (Sweden) Elitserien
- Sport: Bandy
- Duration: 25 October 2011 – 25 March 2012
- Number of teams: 14

Regular season
- League Champions: Sandvikens AIK
- Runners-up: Villa Lidköping BK

Playoffs
- Finals champions: Sandvikens AIK
- Runners-up: Villa Lidköping BK

Elitserien seasons
- ← 2010–2011 2012–2013 →

The 2011–2012 Elitserien was the fifth season of the Swedish bandy league Elitserien.

== League table ==
The regular season started 25 October 2011 and ended 21 February 2012.

Standings as of 12 December 2011

| Pos | Team | Pld | W | D | L | GF | GA | Pts | GD |
|---|---|---|---|---|---|---|---|---|---|
| 1 | Sandvikens AIK | 26 | 19 | 1 | 6 | 146 | 102 | 39 | +44 |
| 2 | Villa Lidköping BK | 26 | 18 | 2 | 6 | 154 | 110 | 38 | +44 |
| 3 | Bollnäs GIF | 26 | 15 | 5 | 6 | 122 | 79 | 35 | +43 |
| 4 | Västerås SK | 26 | 15 | 3 | 8 | 133 | 101 | 33 | +32 |
| 5 | Edsbyns IF | 26 | 13 | 4 | 9 | 122 | 101 | 30 | +21 |
| 6 | IFK Kungälv | 26 | 13 | 3 | 10 | 111 | 86 | 29 | +25 |
| 7 | Hammarby IF | 26 | 11 | 7 | 8 | 115 | 105 | 29 | +10 |
| 8 | Broberg/Söderhamn Bandy | 26 | 10 | 8 | 8 | 106 | 96 | 28 | +10 |
| 9 | GAIS | 26 | 9 | 6 | 11 | 94 | 92 | 24 | +2 |
| 10 | IFK Vänersborg | 26 | 10 | 4 | 12 | 106 | 111 | 24 | –5 |
| 11 | IK Sirius | 26 | 8 | 5 | 13 | 89 | 108 | 21 | –19 |
| 12 | Vetlanda BK | 26 | 6 | 3 | 17 | 90 | 133 | 15 | –43 |
| 13 | Kalix BF | 26 | 5 | 2 | 19 | 90 | 151 | 12 | –61 |
| 14 | Tillberga IK | 26 | 3 | 1 | 22 | 81 | 184 | 7 | –103 |

Teams 1–8 qualifies to the playoffs, teams 9–10 qualifies to next season's Elitserien, teams 11–12 plays the second placed teams of each Allsvenskan to qualify to next season and teams 13–14 are relegated to Allsvenskan

=== Knock-out stage ===
The playoff starts 26 February and ends with the final 25 March 2012.

Quarter finals
1 | Sandvikens AIK | 3 wins
5 | Edsbyns IF | 2 wins
4 | Västerås SK | 2 wins
7 | Hammarby IF | 3 wins
2 | Villa Lidköping BK | 3 wins
6 | IFK Kungälv | 2 wins
3 | Bollnäs GIF | 3 wins
8 | Broberg/Söderhamn Bandy | 0 wins

Semi finals
1 | Sandvikens AIK | 3 wins
7 | Hammarby IF | 0 wins
2 | Villa Lidköping BK | 3 wins
3 | Bollnäs GIF | 1 wins

Final
1 | Sandvikens AIK | 6
2 | Villa Lidköping BK | 5

==== Final ====
25 March 2012
16:00 UTC+1

| Sandvikens AIK | 6–5 | Villa Lidköping BK |
|---|---|---|
| Edlund (3); Nilsson; Löfstedt; Berlin | Report | Karlsson (3); Andersson; Gustafsson |

Attendance: 19,646

== Season statistics ==
=== Top scorers ===
As of end of season.

| Rank | Player | Club | Goals |
|---|---|---|---|
| 1 | (Sweden) David Karlsson | Villa Lidköping BK | 55 |
| 2 | (Sweden) Jesper Bryngelsson | Villa Lidköping BK | 33 |
| 3 | (Sweden) Johan Löfstedt | Sandvikens AIK | 32 |
| 4 | (Sweden) Daniel Andersson | Villa Lidköping BK | 31 |
| 5 | (Finland) Ville Aaltonen | Bollnäs GIF | 30 |
| 6 | (Sweden) Mattias Hammarström | Edsbyns IF | 28 |
| 6 | (Sweden) Stefan Erixon | Hammarby IF | 28 |
| 6 | (Sweden) Tomas Knutson | Västerås SK | 28 |
| 6 | (Sweden) Mikael Lindberg | IFK Kungälv | 28 |
| 10 | (Sweden) Patrik Nilsson | Hammarby IF | 26 |
