= Jonas Svensson =

Jonas Svensson may refer to:

- Jonas Svensson (tennis) (born 1966), Swedish former tennis player
- Jonas Svensson (bandy) (born 1983), Swedish bandy player
- Jonas Svensson (footballer) (born 1993), Norwegian footballer
