= Forslund =

Forslund is a Swedish surname. Notable people with the surname include:

- Albert Forslund (1881–1954), Swedish politician and trade union organizer
- Bengt Forslund (born 1932), Swedish film producer, screenwriter and production manager
- Constance Forslund (born 1950), American actress
- Gus Forslund (1906–1962), Swedish-born professional ice hockey right wing player
- John Forslund (born 1962), American sports announcer
- Kenneth G. Forslund (born 1967), Swedish politician
- Linus Forslund (born 1988), Swedish bandy player
- Tomas Forslund (born 1968), Swedish former professional ice hockey right wing
- Robert Forslund (born 1968), American Artist
