= Westh =

Westh is a surname. Notable people with the surname include:

- Andreas Westh (born 1977), Swedish bandy player
- Bjørn Westh (born 1944), Danish politician
