= Rickard Koch =

Swedish bandy player

Rickard Koch (born 24 February 1976) is a Swedish bandy player who currently plays for Hammarby IF Bandy as a midfielder. Koch represented the Swedish national bandy team in the 2004/05 season. In April 2008 he signed a new two-year contract with "Bajen".

Koch has played for:

Selånger SK (1993–1996)
IFK Kungälv (1996–1998)
Sandvikens AIK (1998–2001)
Hammarby IF Bandy (from 2001)
