= Henrik Hagberg (bandy) =

Swedish bandy player

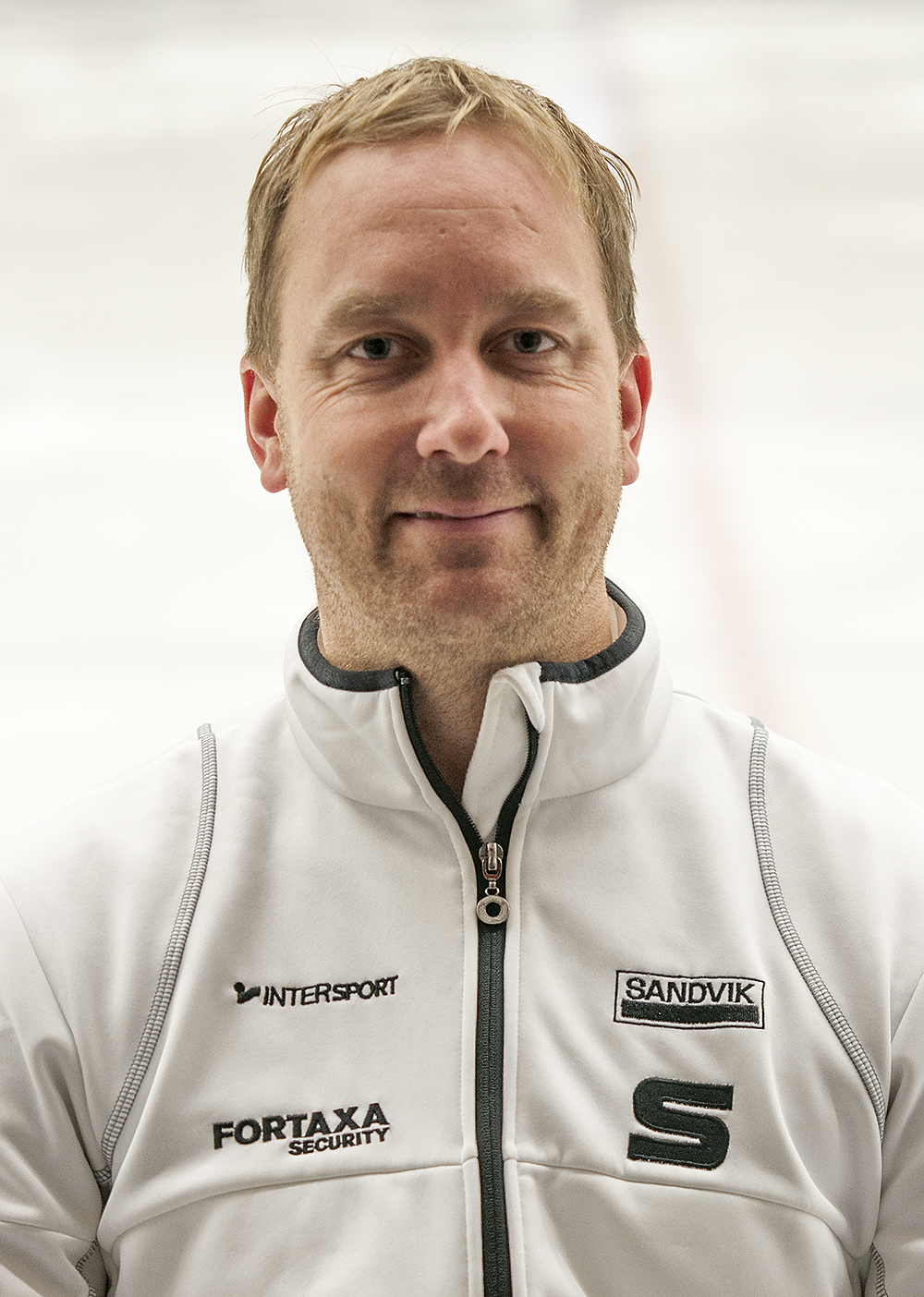
- October, 2015

Personal information
- Born: 8 September 1975 (age 50)
- Playing position: Midfielder

Youth career
- IFK Motala

Senior career*
Years	Team	Apps^{†}	(Gls)^{†}
1994–1998	IFK Motala		
1998–2009	Sandviken		

National team
1998–2006	Sweden		
Medal record
Men's bandy
Representing Sweden
World Championships
Gold medal – first place	2003 Arkhangelsk	Team
Gold medal – first place	2005 Kazan	Team
- * Senior club appearances and goals counted for the domestic league only. † Appearances (Goals).

Henrik Hagberg (born 8 September 1975) is a Swedish former bandy player who most recently for Sandvikens AIK as a midfielder.

== Career ==
=== Club career ===
Hagberg was brought up by IFK Motala but left for Sandvikens AIK in 1998 and played there for 11 seasons.

He was a member of the Sandvikens AIK squads that won the Swedish champions in 1999–2000, 2001–02 and 2002–03 seasons. He was also a member of the Bandy World Cup winning squad in 2001–02 season.

=== International career ===
Hagberg was part of Swedish World Champions teams of 2003 and 2005

== Honours ==
=== Country ===
Sweden

- Bandy World Championship: 2003, 2005
