= Uralsky Trubnik Stadium =

Sports venue in Pervouralsk, Russia

- Interactive map of Uralsky Trubnik Stadium
- Location: Pervouralsk, Russia
- Capacity: 6,000

Construction
- Opened: 1955

Tenants
- SKA-Sverdlovsk; Uralsky Trubnik

Uralsky Trubnik Stadium is a sports venue in Pervouralsk, the only one in the Russian Bandy Super League without artificial ice. It is the home of SKA-Sverdlovsk and Uralsky Trubnik.
