= Lars Johansson (bandy) =

Swedish retired bandy player (born 1976)

Lars Johansson (born 1 June 1976) is a Swedish retired bandy player. He played as a defender during his whole career. Lars was a youth product of Kalix Bandy.

In April 2008 he returned to Hammarby after a three-year spell at Västerås SK. Johansson signed a two-year contract (with option for a third) with "Bajen". He retired from the game at the end of his contract, winning one gold medal in his last stint with Hammarby.

Lars played for four clubs. His list of clubs are as follows-

Kalix Bandy (1994-2002)
Hammarby IF Bandy (2002-2005)
Sköndals IK (2003-2005)
Västerås SK (2005-2008)
Hammarby IF Bandy (2008-2010)
