= Mikko Aarni =

Finnish former bandy forward

Personal information
- Date of birth: 31 May 1981 (age 43)
- Playing position: Forward

Senior career*
Years	Team	Apps^{†}	(Gls)^{†}
1997–2004	Tornio		
2005–2006	Kalix		
2006–2014	Sandviken		

National team
- Finland
Medal record
Men's bandy
Representing Finland
World Championships
Gold medal – first place	2004 Sweden	Team
- * Senior club appearances and goals counted for the domestic league only. † Appearances (Goals).

Mikko Aarni (born 31 May 1981) is a Finnish former bandy forward.

== Career ==
Aarni was brought up by Tornio PV and moved to Kalix Bandy in 2004. In 2006, he joined Sandvikens AIK.

== International career ==
Aarni was part of the gold-winning Finnish national bandy team at the Bandy World Championship 2004, which was held in Sweden and Hungary.
