= Dennis Gustafsson =

Swedish bandy player

Dennis Gustafsson (born February 17, 1972) is a Swedish bandy player who currently plays for Vetlanda BK as goalkeeper. Dennis has made over 400 appearances in the Allsvenskan.

Dennis has played for three clubs-

IFK Motala (1989–1999)
Hammarby IF Bandy (1999–2003)
IFK Motala (2003–2005)
Vetlanda BK (2005–present)
