= Oscar Jonsson (bandy) =

Swedish bandy player (born 1977)

Oscar Jonsson (born 21 April 1977) is a Swedish bandy player who currently plays for Ljusdals BK as a half back or midfielder. Oscar represented the Swedish national bandy team during the 2004/05 season.

Oscar has played for two clubs. His list of clubs are as follows-

Ljusdals BK (1995-2001)
Hammarby IF Bandy (2001-2009)
Ljusdals BK (2009-)
