= Marcus Bergwall =

Swedish former bandy player

Personal information
- Date of birth: 11 January 1971 (age 54)
- Playing position: Defender

Youth career
- Lesjöfors

Senior career*
Years	Team	Apps^{†}	(Gls)^{†}
1991–1999	Boltic		
1999–2001	Hammarby		
2001–2003	BolticGöta		
2003–2004	Raketa		
2004–2005	BolticGöta		
2005–2006	Hammarby		
2005–2006	Sköndal/GT76		
2005–2007	Hammarby		
2007–2008	Dynamo Moscow		
2008–2009	Vetlanda		
2009–2010	IFK Kungälv		
2009–2011	IFK Vänersborg		
2012–2013	Karlstad Bandy		
2012–2014	Mosserud		

National team
- Sweden
Medal record
Men's bandy
Representing Sweden
World Championships
Gold medal – first place	1997 Sweden	Team
Gold medal – first place	2003 Arkhangelsk	Team
Gold medal – first place	2005 Kazan	Team
Gold medal – first place	2009 Västerås	Team
Silver medal – second place	2007 Kemerovo	Team
- * Senior club appearances and goals counted for the domestic league only. † Appearances (Goals).

Marcus Bergwall (born 11 January 1971) is a Swedish former bandy player who played as defender. Marcus is the older brother of teammate Andreas Bergwall. Marcus has played many games for Sweden's national team and played in several Bandy World Championships.

== Career ==
=== Club career ===
Bergwall is a youth product of Lesjöfors and has represented Boltic, Hammarby, BolticGöta, Raketa, Sköndal/GT76, Dynamo Moscow, Vetlanda, IFK Kungälv, IFK Vänersborg, Karlstad Bandy, and Mosserud.

=== International career ===
Bergwall was part of Swedish World Champion teams of 1997, 2003, 2005, and 2009.

== Honours ==
=== Country ===
Sweden

- Bandy World Championship: 1997, 2003, 2005, 2009
