= Stefan Persson (bandy) =

Swedish bandy player

Stefan Persson (born October 26, 1974) was a Swedish bandy player who played for Hammarby IF Bandy as a defender. He bagan with Selånger SK Bandy where he stayed until the club were no longer strong, moving then to Hammarby. After almost giving up on his career in 2005 due to illness, he retired in autumn 2008 and became the assistant coach of Hammarby.

Persson has played for two clubs - Selånger SK (1993-1997) and Hammarby IF (1997-2008).
