= Anders Bruun =

Swedish bandy player

Personal information
- Born: 15 May 1979 (age 47)

Youth career
- IFK Motala

Senior career*
Years	Team	Apps^{†}	(Gls)^{†}
1997–2002	IFK Motala		
2002–2013	Västerås		
2013–2014	Volga		
2014–2018	Västerås		

National team
- Sweden
Medal record
Men's bandy
Representing Sweden
World Championships
Silver medal – second place	2007 Kemerovo	Team
- * Senior club appearances and goals counted for the domestic league only. † Appearances (Goals).

Anders Bruun (born 15 May 1979) is a Swedish bandy player who currently plays for Västerås SK as a defender.

== Career ==
Bruun is a youth product of IFK Motala and has represented their senior team, Västerås, and Volga.
