= Daniel Kjörling =

Swedish bandy player

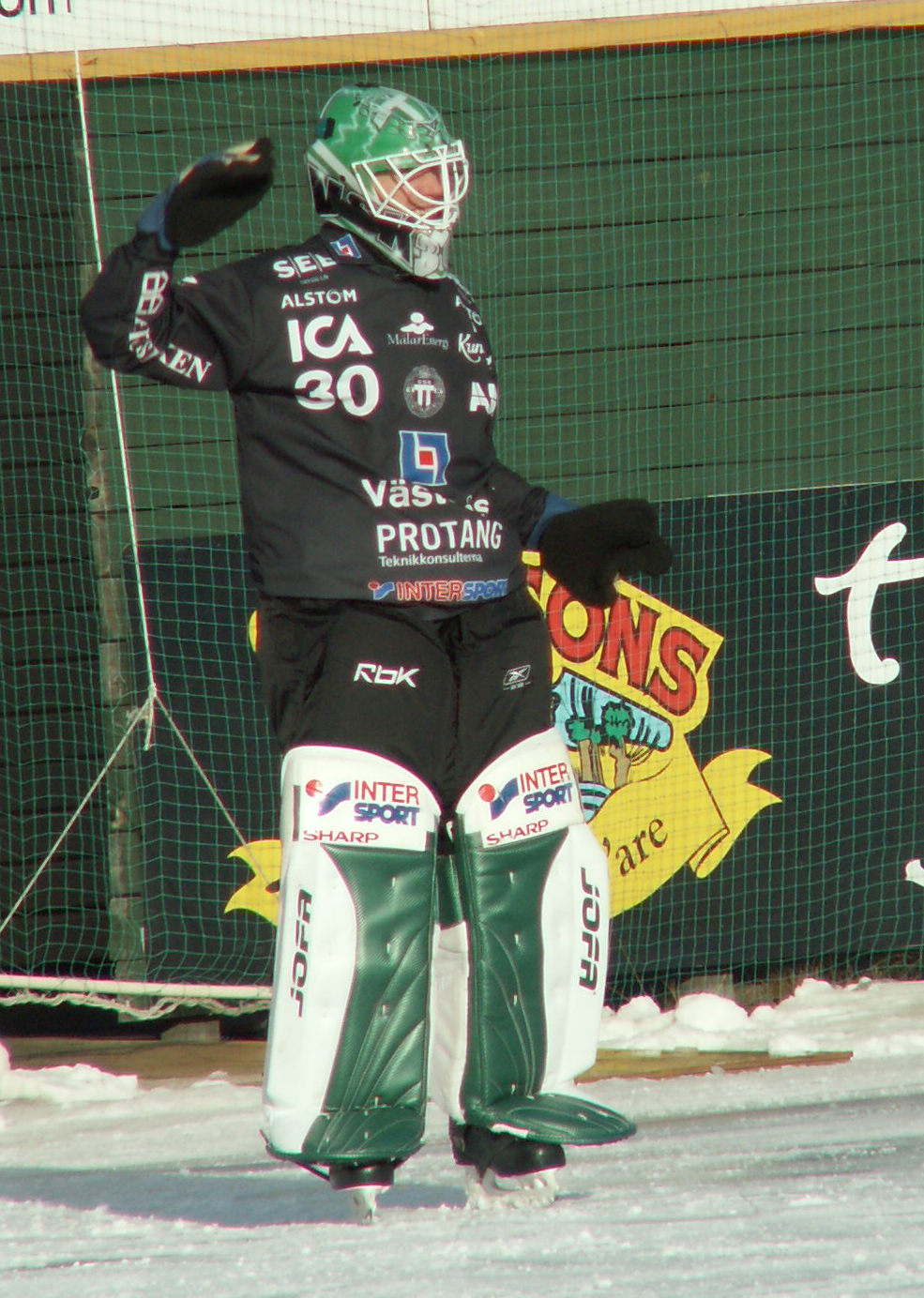
- Daniel Kjörling in 2007.

Personal information
- Born: 12 November 1973 (age 52)
- Height: 1.81 m (5 ft 11 in)
- Playing position: Goalkeeper

Youth career
- Uppsala BoIS

Senior career*
Years	Team	Apps^{†}	(Gls)^{†}
1990–2004	Sandviken		
2004–2010	Västerås		

National team
1998–2004	Sweden		
Medal record
Men's bandy
Representing Sweden
World Championships
Gold medal – first place	2003 Arkhangelsk	Team
- * Senior club appearances and goals counted for the domestic league only. † Appearances (Goals).

Daniel Kjörling (born 12 November 1973) is a Swedish former bandy player who most recently played for Västerås SK as a goalkeeper.

== Career ==
=== Club career ===
Kjörling is a youth product of Uppsala BoIS and has represented Sandviken and Västerås.

=== International career ===
Kjörling was part of Swedish World Champions team of 2003

== Honours ==
=== Country ===
Sweden

- Bandy World Championship: 2003
