= Petteri Lampinen =

Finnish bandy player

Personal information
- Date of birth: 5 February 1975 (age 50)
Medal record
Men's bandy
Representing Finland
World Championships
| Gold medal – first place | 2004 Sweden | Team |

Petteri Lampinen (born 5 February 1975) is a Finnish bandy player who plays for Russian side Rodina and the Finnish national bandy team. Petteri plays in defence and has gained three national champions medals whilst at Edsbyns IF. He made his debut for the national team near the start of 21st century while he was still a Tornio PV player.

== Clubs ==
| Club | Time at club |
|---|---|
| Tornio PV | 1994–2001 |
| Broberg/Söderhamn Bandy | 2001–03 |
| Edsbyns IF | 2003—2007 |
| Raketa | 2007—2008 |
| Zorky | 2008-2009 |
| Dynamo Kazan | 2009-2012 |
| Rodina | 2012- |
