= Stefan Andersson (bandy) =

Swedish Bandy player

Personal information
- Born: 20 May 1969 (age 56)
- Playing position: Midfielder

Youth career
- IK Heros

Senior career*
Years	Team	Apps^{†}	(Gls)^{†}
1986–1987	IK Heros		
1987–2008	Sandvikens AIK		

National team
1993–1994	Sweden		
- * Senior club appearances and goals counted for the domestic league only. † Appearances (Goals).

Stefan Andersson (born 20 May 1969) is a Swedish bandy player who currently plays for Sandvikens AIK as a midfielder. Stefan was brought up by IK Heros BK but left to play at a higher level. Andersson is playing in his twentieth season for Sandvikens AIK.

Andersson has played for the Swedish national bandy team during the 1993–94 season. Andersson was a member of the Sandvikens AIK squads that won the Swedish championship in the 1999–2000, 2001–02 and 2002–03 seasons as well as being a member of the Bandy World Cup winning squad in 2001–02 season.
