= Stefan Söderholm =

Swedish bandy manager and former player (born 1979)

Personal information
- Born: 23 May 1979 (age 46)
- Playing position: Midfielder

Club information
- Current team: Sandvikens AIK (manager)

Youth career
- Edsbyns IF

Senior career*
| Years | Team | Apps^{†} | (Gls)^{†} |
| 1996–1999 | Edsbyns IF | | |
| 1999–2003 | Sandvikens AIK | | |
| 2003–2004 | Edsbyns IF | | |
| 2004–2009 | Sandvikens AIK | | |
| 2010–2011 | Skutskärs IF | | |
| 2013–2014 | Sandvikens AIK | | |

National team
| 2001–2006 | Sweden | | |

Teams managed
- 2012–2015: Sandvikens AIK
Medal record
Men's bandy
Representing Sweden
World Championships
| Gold medal – first place | 2003 Arkhangelsk | Team |
| Gold medal – first place | 2005 Kazan | Team |
- * Senior club appearances and goals counted for the domestic league only. † Appearances (Goals).

Stefan "Dino" Söderholm (born 23 May 1979) is a Swedish bandy manager and former player (midfielder) who most recently managed Sandvikens AIK. Söderholm was brought up by Edsbyns IF. Söderholm has played for the Swedish national bandy team making his debut in the 2001–02 season. Söderholm has been a member of Swedish championship winning squads in the 1999–2000, 2001–02 and 2002–03 seasons for Sandvikens AIK and the 2003–04 season for Edsbyns IF He was also a member of the Bandy World Cup winning squad in 2001–02 season.

Söderholm coached Sandvikens AIK 2012–2015.

== Honours ==
=== Club ===
Sandvikens AIK

- Swedish Champions (3): 2000, 2002, 2003

Edsbyns IF

- Swedish Champions (1): 2004

=== Country ===
Sweden

- Bandy World Championship: 2003, 2005

=== Individual ===
- Swedish Junior Player of the Year (1): 1997
