= Eskilstuna BS =

- City: Eskilstuna, Sweden
- League: Division 1
- Division: Östra
- Founded: 1965; 60 years ago
- Home arena: Eskilstuna isstadion

Eskilstuna BS is a bandy club in Eskilstuna, Sweden, established in 1965 following a merger of the bandy sections of Eskilhems BK and VoIF Diana. The men's bandy team played in the Swedish top division in the seasons of 1972-1973 and 1977-1978.
