= Mosseruds GF =

Sports club in Karlstad, Sweden

- Full name: Mosseruds gymnastikförening
- Sport: bandy
- Founded: 8 September 1938
- Based in: Karlstad, Sweden
- Stadium: Tingvalla isstadion

Mosseruds GF is a sports club in Karlstad, Sweden, established on 8 September 1938. In 2010, the men's bandy team qualified for the Swedish second division.
