= Andreas Bomark =

Swedish Bandy player

Andreas Bomarkan
Personal information
- Full name: Karl Andreas Bomark
- Born: 20 September 1975 (age 50) Sweden
- Playing position: Goalkeeper

Youth career
- Edsbyns IF

Senior career*
Years	Team	Apps^{†}	(Gls)^{†}
1993–1996	Edsbyns IF		
1996–2001	IK Sirius		
2001–2005	Hammarby IF		
2005–2008	IK Sirius		
- * Senior club appearances and goals counted for the domestic league only. † Appearances (Goals).

Andreas Bomark (born 20 September 1975) is a former Swedish bandy goalkeeper.

Bomark was a youth product of Edsbyns IF. He reached his first national final with Hammarby IF in 2003, but lost 4–6 to Sandvikens AIK. The club ended as consecutive runners-up in 2003, losing 6–7 to Edsbyns IF in the final.
