= Jonas Svensson (bandy) =

Swedish bandy player

Jonas Svensson (born 27 June 1983) is a Swedish bandy player who currently plays for Ljusdals BK as a goalkeeper. Jonas was developed at Ljusdals BK and have after that played for a lot of clubs. In April 2008 he signed, together with Hammarbys other goalkeeper Patrik Nordgaard, a new two-year contract (with option for a third) with Hammarby. He returned home to Ljusdal in summer of 2009.

Jonas has played for many clubs. His list of clubs are as follows-

Ljusdals BK (1999-2003)
Hammarby IF Bandy (2003-2006)
Sköndals IK (2003-2005)
GT-76 (2005-2006)
Sandvikens AIK (2006-2007)
Hammarby IF Bandy (2007-2009)
Ljusdals BK (2009-)
