= Magnus Joneby =

Swedish bandy player

Magnus Joneby (born 1 December 1984) is a Swedish bandy player who currently plays for Västerås SK as a half back. Magnus is a youth product of Västerås SK where he has remained through his career so far. Magnus made his first team debut in the 2002/03 season.
