= Magnus Olsson (bandy) =

Swedish bandy player

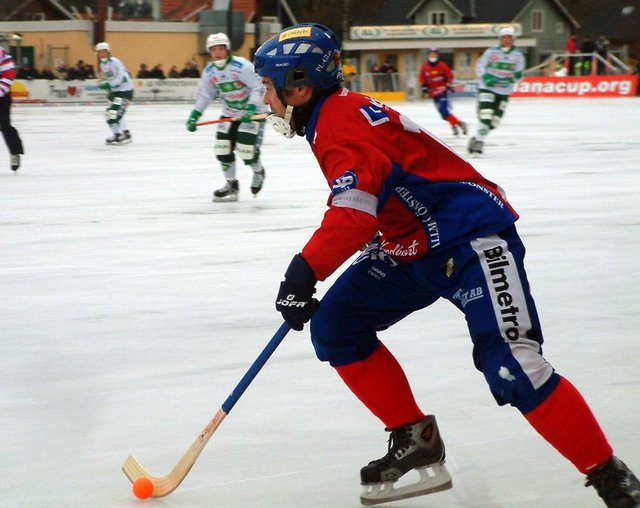
- Magnus Olsson playing in the 2005 Bandy World Cup

Personal information
- Born: 25 January 1972 (age 54)
- Playing position: Midfielder
- Number: 16

Youth career
- Edsbyn

Senior career*
Years	Team	Apps^{†}	(Gls)^{†}
1987–2016	Edsbyn		

National team
1994–2007	Sweden		
Medal record
Men's bandy
Representing Sweden
World Championships
Gold medal – first place	1995 Minnesota	Team
Gold medal – first place	1997 Sweden	Team
Silver medal – second place	2007 Kemerovo	Team
- * Senior club appearances and goals counted for the domestic league only. † Appearances (Goals).

Magnus Olsson (born 25 January 1972) is a Swedish former bandy player who most played his entire professional career for Edsbyns IF as a midfielder.

== Career ==
=== Club career ===
Olsson is a youth product of Edsbyn and has represented their senior team his entire career from 1987 to 2016. While at Edsbyn, Olsson was a member of their squads that won the Swedish championship in the 2003–04, 2004–05, 2005–06, 2006–07 and 2007–08 seasons. He was also part of the Bandy World Cup winning squad in 2001–02 season.

=== International career ===
Olsson was part of Swedish World Champions teams of 1995 and 1997.

== Honours ==
=== Country ===
Sweden

- Bandy World Championship: 1995, 1997
