= Pelle Fosshaug =

Swedish bandy player and manager

Personal information
- Full name: Per Fosshaug
- Born: 24 February 1965 (age 61)
- Playing position: Midfielder

Club information
- Current team: Somalia (manager)

Senior career*
Years	Team	Apps^{†}	(Gls)^{†}
1982–1986	Borlänge-Stora Tuna BK		
1986–1990	Falu BS		
1990–1992	IFK Vänersborg		
1992–2004	Västerås SK		
2004–2005	Sandvikens AIK		
2005–2012	Tillberga IK		

National team
1988–2005	Sweden	129	

Teams managed
- 2008–2009: Tillberga IK
- 2013–: Somalia
Medal record
Men's bandy
Representing Sweden
World Championships
Gold medal – first place	1993 Norway	Team
Gold medal – first place	1995 Minnesota	Team
Gold medal – first place	1997 Sweden	Team
Gold medal – first place	2003 Arkhangelsk	Team
Gold medal – first place	2005 Kazan	Team
- * Senior club appearances and goals counted for the domestic league only. † Appearances (Goals).

Per "Pelle" Fosshaug (born 24 February 1965) is a Swedish bandy manager and former bandy player. Fosshaug played in midfield for many clubs in Sweden, as well as for the Sweden national bandy team, for which he made a record 129 appearances between 1994 and 2005.

Fosshaug has made 129 appearances for Sweden.

== Career ==
His career began in the 1982–83 season, where he played for second division side Borlänge-Stora Tuna BK. In 1986, he moved to Allsvenskan side Falu BS, where he spent two seasons, followed by another two at IFK Vänersborg. In 1992, he made the move to Västerås SK Bandy, the club with which he became most commonly associated. During his time with Västerås SK, Fosshaug made the majority of his national team appearances. In 2004, he joined Sandvikens AIK. He was perhaps a surprise inclusion in the Swedish national bandy team for that season's Bandy World Championship, but he made 7 appearances in the tournament, scoring 2 goals. After just one year at Sandvikens AIK, Fosshaug stepped down a division to join Tillberga IK, helping the team win promotion to the Allsvenskan, which at the time was the top-tier in Swedish bandy.

He was characterized by his rough style of play and was diagnosed with ADHD in 2007.

After his active playing career, Fosshaug has been a coach for Borlänge-Stora Tuna BK and for the Somalia national bandy team.

== Honours ==
=== Country ===
Sweden

- Bandy World Championship: 1993, 1995, 1997, 2003, 2005
