= Erik Säfström =

Swedish professional bandy half-back (born 1988)

Personal information
- Born: 8 May 1988 (age 37)
- Playing position: Half-back

Club information
- Current team: Sandviken
- Number: 8

Youth career
- Örebro

Senior career*
Years	Team	Apps^{†}	(Gls)^{†}
2003–2010	Örebro		
2010–2015	Sandviken		
2015–2016	SKA-Neftyanik		
2017–	Sandviken		

National team
- Sweden
Medal record
Men's bandy
Representing Sweden
World Championships
Gold medal – first place	2012 Almaty	Team
Gold medal – first place	2017 Sandviken	Team
Silver medal – second place	2014 Irkutsk	Team
Silver medal – second place	2018 Khabarovsk	Team
- * Senior club appearances and goals counted for the domestic league only. † Appearances (Goals).

Erik Säfström (born 8 May 1988) is a Swedish professional bandy half-back.

== Career ==
=== Club career ===
Säfström is a youth product of Örebro and has represented their senior team, Sandviken, and SKA-Neftyanik.

=== International career ===
Säfström was part of Swedish World Champions teams of 2012 and 2017.

== Honours ==
=== Country ===
Sweden

- Bandy World Championship: 2012, 2017
