= Robin Sundin =

Swedish bandy player

Personal information
- Born: 28 June 1983 (age 43) Örebro, Sweden
- Height: 176 cm (5 ft 9 in)
- Playing position: Midfielder

Club information
- Current team: Hammarby IF
- Number: 17

Youth career
- Örebro SK

Senior career*
Years	Team	Apps^{†}	(Gls)^{†}
2003–2005	Örebro SK		
2005–2006	BS BolticGöta		
2006–2007	Hammarby IF		
2007–2008	Uralsky Trubnik		
2008–	Hammarby IF		

National team
- Sweden
- * Senior club appearances and goals counted for the domestic league only. † Appearances (Goals).

Robin Sundin (born 28 June 1983) is a Swedish bandy player who plays for Hammarby IF as a midfielder.

== Career ==
After playing for Örebro SK, BS BolticGöta and Hammarby IF, before leaving to play Uralsky Trubnik in Russia in 2007. The club suffered from financial difficulties, which meant that Sundin returned to Hammarby IF a year later together with his teammates Jesper Ericsson and Kalle Spjuth.

He won the Swedish championship with Hammarby IF in 2010 and 2013.

== Honours ==
=== Club ===
Hammarby IF

- Swedish Championship: 2010, 2013
- World Cup: 2009
- Svenska Cupen: 2013, 2014
