= Linus Pettersson =

Swedish bandy player (born 1987)

Personal information
- Born: 31 May 1987 (age 38)
- Playing position: Defender

Club information
- Current team: Bollnäs GIF
- Number: 15

Youth career
- IFK Motala

Senior career*
Years	Team	Apps^{†}	(Gls)^{†}
2004–2012	Sandviken		
2012–2014	Zorky		
2014–	Sandviken		

National team
- Sweden
Medal record
Men's bandy
Representing Sweden
World Championships
Gold medal – first place	2010 Moscow	Team
Gold medal – first place	2012 Almaty	Team
Gold medal – first place	2017 Sandviken	Team
Silver medal – second place	2014 Irkutsk	Team
Silver medal – second place	2018 Khabarovsk	Team
- * Senior club appearances and goals counted for the domestic league only. † Appearances (Goals).

Linus Pettersson (born 13 May 1987) is a Swedish bandy player who currently plays for Sandvikens AIK as a defender.

== Career ==
=== Club career ===
Pettersson is a youth product of IFK Motala and has represented Sandviken and Zorky.

=== International career ===
Pettersson was part of Swedish World Champions teams of 2010, 2012, and 2017.

== Honours ==
=== Country ===
Sweden

- Bandy World Championship: 2010, 2012, 2017
