= Ulf Einarsson =

Swedish bandy player

Personal information
- Full name: Ulf Einarsson
- Date of birth: 27 July 1981 (age 43)
- Playing position: Midfielder

Club information
- Current team: Åby/Tjureda

Senior career*
Years	Team	Apps^{†}	(Gls)^{†}
1999–2002	Vetlanda		
2002–2005	Boltic/Göta		
2005–2006	Nävelsjö		
2005–2008	Vetlanda		
2008–2009	Dynamo Kazan		
2009–2016	Hammarby		
2017–	Åby/Tjureda		

National team
- Sweden
- * Senior club appearances and goals counted for the domestic league only. † Appearances (Goals).

Ulf Einarsson (born 27 July 1981) is a Swedish bandy player who currently plays for Åby/Tjureda.
