= Joel Othén =

Swedish bandy player

Joel Othén (born September 6, 1985) is a Swedish bandy player who currently plays for Sandvikens AIK as a goalkeeper. Joel was brought up by Skutskärs IF but moved when he was still young to go to Sandvikens AIK. Joel has played for the Swedish youth team.

His list of clubs is as follows-

Skutskärs IF
Sandvikens AIK (2003-2013, 2016-)
SKA-Neftyanik (2013-2016)
