= Daniel Liw =

Swedish bandy player

Personal information
- Date of birth: 24 January 1979 (age 46)
- Playing position: Midfielder

Club information
- Current team: Edsbyn
- Number: 10

Senior career*
Years	Team	Apps^{†}	(Gls)^{†}
1997–1999	Västerås		
1999–2001	Hammarby		
2001–2006	Edsbyn		
2006–2007	Dynamo Moscow		
2007–	Edsbyn		

National team
- Sweden
Medal record
Men's bandy
Representing Sweden
World Championships
Gold medal – first place	2005 Kazan	Team
Silver medal – second place	2007 Kemerovo	Team
- * Senior club appearances and goals counted for the domestic league only. † Appearances (Goals).

Daniel Liw (born 24 January 1979) is a Swedish bandy player who used to play for Edsbyn as a midfielder.

== Career ==
=== Club career ===
Liw is a youth product of Edsbyn and has represented their Västerås, Hammarby, Edsbyn, and Dynamo Moscow.

=== International career ===
Liw was part of Swedish World Champions team of 2005.

== Honours ==
=== Country ===
Sweden

- Bandy World Championship: 2005
