= Linus Forslund =

Swedish Bandy player

Linus Forslund (born 30 November 1988) is a Swedish bandy player who plays for Sandvikens AIK as a forward. Linus is a youth product of Sandvikens AIK and is now battling for a regular place in the first team. Linus spent part of last season at Söderfors GoIF in order to give him match practice. Linus has played for both the Swedish Under 17 and Under 19 teams.

Linus has played for two clubs:

Sandvikens AIK (2004-2005)
Söderfors GoIF (2005-2006)
Sandvikens AIK (2006-)
