= Andreas Eskhult =

Swedish retired bandy midfielder

Personal information
- Date of birth: 1 April 1977 (age 47)
- Playing position: Midfielder

Youth career
- Sirius

Senior career*
Years	Team	Apps^{†}	(Gls)^{†}
1994–1997	Sirius		
1997–2004	Hammarby		
2004–2005	Raketa		
2005–2007	Hammarby		
2007–2008	Zorky		
2007–2014	Sirius		
2013–2015	Wattholma Tensta Bandy		

National team
2001–2005	Sweden		
- * Senior club appearances and goals counted for the domestic league only. † Appearances (Goals).

Andreas Eskhult (born 1 April 1977) is a Swedish retired bandy midfielder.

== Career ==
=== Club career ===
Eskhult is a youth product of Sirius and has represented their senior team, Hammarby, Raketa, Zorky, and Wattholma Tensta Bandy.

=== International career ===
Eskhult played for the Swedish national bandy team in 2001–2005.
