= Daniel Eriksson =

Swedish bandy player

Personal information
- Date of birth: 20 October 1974 (age 50)
- Playing position: Defender

Youth career
- Sandviken

Senior career*
Years	Team	Apps^{†}	(Gls)^{†}
1993–2003	Sandviken		
2003–2004	Vodnik		
2004–2008	Sandviken		
2008–2009	Dynamo Moscow		
2009–2011	Sandviken		

National team
- Sweden
Medal record
Men's bandy
Representing Sweden
World Championships
Gold medal – first place	2003 Arkhangelsk	Team
Gold medal – first place	2005 Kazan	Team
- * Senior club appearances and goals counted for the domestic league only. † Appearances (Goals).

Daniel Eriksson (born 20 October 1974) is a Swedish retired bandy player.

== Career ==
=== Club career ===
Eriksson is a youth product of Sandviken and has represented their senior team, Vodnik and Dynamo Moscow.

=== International career ===
Eriksson has played for the Swedish national bandy team making his debut in the 2000–01 season. Eriksson was part of Swedish World Champions teams of 2003 and 2005

== Honours ==
=== Country ===
Sweden

- Bandy World Championship: 2003, 2005
