= Patrik Anderbro =

Swedish former bandy player

Andreas Bergwall
Personal information
- Born: 8 March 1973 (age 53)
- Playing position: Midfielder; Forward

Youth career
- IFK Eskilstuna

Senior career*
Years	Team	Apps^{†}	(Gls)^{†}
1994–2001	Falu BS		
2001–2009	Västerås SK		
- * Senior club appearances and goals counted for the domestic league only. † Appearances (Goals).

Patrik Anderbro (born 8 March 1973) is a Swedish former bandy player who most recently played for Västerås SK as a midfielder or forward. Anderbro was a youth product of IFK Eskilstuna.
