= Daniel Skarps =

Swedish bandy player (born 1976)

Personal information
- Born: August 24, 1976 (age 49) Sweden
- Playing position: Versatile player

Club information
- Current team: Bollnäs GIF

Senior career*
Years	Team	Apps^{†}	(Gls)^{†}
1993–1994	Bollnäs GIF		
1994–1995	Edsbyns IF		
1996–2000	Bollnäs GIF		
2000–2001	Edsbyns IF		
2001–2003	Gripen/Trollhättan BK		
2003–2004	IF Vindhemspojkarna		
2004–	Bollnäs GIF		
- * Senior club appearances and goals counted for the domestic league only. † Appearances (Goals).

Daniel Skarps (born 24 August 1976) is a Swedish bandy player who currently plays for Bollnäs GIF as a versatile player. Daniel was a youth product of Bollnäs GIF and is now in his third spell at the club after spells at other clubs.

Daniel has played for:

Bollnäs GIF (1993–1994)
Edsbyns IF (1994–1995)
Bollnäs GIF (1996–2000)
Edsbyns IF (2000–2001)
Gripen/Trollhättan BK (2001–2003)
IF Vindhemspojkarna (2003–2004)
Bollnäs GIF (2004–present)
