= Patrik Nordgaard =

Swedish retired bandy player (born 1980)

Personal information
- Date of birth: 18 March 1980 (age 45)
- Playing position: Goalkeeper

Senior career*
Years	Team	Apps^{†}	(Gls)^{†}
2003–2004	Helenelund		
2004–2005	Djurgården		
2004–2005	Västerås		
2005–2010	Hammarby		
- * Senior club appearances and goals counted for the domestic league only. † Appearances (Goals).

Patrik Nordgaard (born 18 March 1980) is a Swedish retired bandy player who last played for Hammarby as a goalkeeper.

== Career ==
=== Club career ===
Nordgaard has represented Helenelund, Djurgården, Västerås, Hammarby. Nordgaard retired from the game in 2010 after becoming Swedish champions with his last club Hammarby.

== Honours ==
=== Club ===
Hammarby

- Swedish Championship: 2010
