= SKA-Uralsky Trubnik =

- City: Pervouralsk, Russia
- League: Russian Bandy Super League
- Founded: 1937; 89 years ago
- Home arena: Uralsky Trubnik Stadium (capacity: 6000)
- Website: https://ska-trubnik.info
| Home colours | Away colours |

SKA-Uralsky Trubnik (Russian: СКА-Уральский трубник), formerly known as Uralsky Trubnik is a bandy club from Pervouralsk that plays representing Sverdlovsk Oblast in the Russian Bandy Super League. After the indoor stadium Volga-Sport-Arena in Ulyanovsk was finished, Uralsky Trubnik was for a few years the only club in the highest division without artificial ice. That is until Murman got promoted for the 2018–19 season. However, a decision to build an indoor bandy stadium has been taken. In 2017 the team won the pre-season tournament ExTeCupen. In 2019 the club for the first time in its history took a medal in the domestic league with a third place.In the 2025-26 season, the team again performed well, winning 5th place against Yenisey.

== Akademia Uralsky Trubnik ==
Akademia Uralsky Trubnik is a youth team of Uralsky Trubnik founded in 2023. In its

Akademia Uralsky Trubnik
- City: Pervouralsk, Russia
- League: Russian Bandy Supreme League
- Founded: 2023; 3 years ago
- Home arena: Uralsky Trubnik Stadium (capacity: 6000)
- Website: https://ahm-ut.ru

debut season it earned 9th place after defeating Mayak Krasnoturinsk 4:7 in the finalising matches, and next year performed very well by finishing 2nd in the 1st stage, only being beaten by Akzhayik by 3 points, and finishing the season 6th after losing 3:2 to Mayak Krasnoturinsk. It then performed exceptionally well in the 2025-26 season, finishing 1st in Subgroup 2 in the 1st Stage and finishing 1st in the B Group of 1st Stage of the Finale, and then finished 2nd overall, with the winning team being Baykal-Energiya, a team that has just relegated from the Russian Bandy Super League. Akademia Uralsky Trubnik lost only 5 games in total in the 2025-26 season.
