= Anders Östling =

Swedish bandy player

Personal information
- Date of birth: 8 January 1972 (age 53)
- Height: 1.86 m (6 ft 1 in)
- Playing position: Midfielder

Club information
- Current team: Tillberga

Youth career
- Skutskär

Senior career*
Years	Team	Apps^{†}	(Gls)^{†}
1993–1996	Sandviken		
1996–1997	Edsbyn		
1997–1999	Sandviken		
1999–2008	Västerås		
2008–2009	Dynamo Kazan		
2009–2010	Västerås		
2010–2015	Tillberga		
2017–	Tillberga		

National team
2000–2009	Sweden		
Medal record
Men's bandy
Representing Sweden
World Championships
Gold medal – first place	2003 Arkhangelsk	Team
Gold medal – first place	2005 Kazan	Team
Gold medal – first place	2009 Västerås	Team
Silver medal – second place	2007 Kemerovo	Team
- * Senior club appearances and goals counted for the domestic league only. † Appearances (Goals).

Anders Östling (born 8 January 1972) is a Swedish bandy player, currently playing for Tillberga IK.

== Career ==
=== Club career ===
Östling is a youth product of Skutskär and has represented Sandviken, Edsbyn, Västerås, Dynamo Kazan, and Tillberga.

=== International career ===
Östling was part of Swedish World Champion teams of 2003, 2005, and 2009.

== Honours ==
=== Country ===
Sweden

- Bandy World Championship: 2003, 2005, 2009
