= Kalle Spjuth =

Swedish bandy player

Kalle Spjuth (born 27 May 1984) is a retired Swedish bandy player who played as a forward. Kalle is the younger brother of Slottsbrons IF player Per Spjuth and IK Tellus player Ola Spjuth.

Kalle signed for Russian team Uralsky Trubnik after 2007. After Uralskys financial problems in winter of 2008, he together with team fellow, Robin Sundin and Jesper Ericsson, returned to former club Hammarby.

He was mostly injured during the 2010 campaign when Hammarby got their first gold medal ever. He then signed for IK Sirius from the city of Uppsala, but returned to Hammarby in 2012.

== Clubs ==
Kalle has played for four clubs.

Oxelösunds IK (1999–2002)
Hammarby IF Bandy (2002–2007)
Uralsky Trubnik (2007–2008)
Hammarby IF Bandy (2008–2010)
IK Sirius (2010-2012)
Hammarby IF Bandy (2012–2018)
