= Ville Aaltonen =

Finnish bandy player (born 1979)

Personal information
- Born: 17 May 1979 (age 46) Pori, Finland
- Playing position: MF

Club information
- Current team: Bollnäs GoIF
- Number: 34

Senior career*
Years	Team	Apps^{†}	(Gls)^{†}
1998–2001	Porin Narukera		
2001–2004	Ljusdals BK		
2004–2007	Bollnäs GoIF		
2007–2008	Zorki Krasnogorsk		
2009–	Bollnäs GoIF		

National team
2001-present	Finland		
Medal record
Men's bandy
Representing Finland
World Championships
Gold medal – first place	2004 Sweden	Team
- * Senior club appearances and goals counted for the domestic league only. † Appearances (Goals).

Ville Aaltonen (born 17 May 1979) is a Finnish bandy player. He is considered an all-rounder but is usually used offensively or in the attacking midfield.

Until 2001, Aaltonen played for his hometown club Porin Narukerä, with whom he became Finnish champion in 1999. It was also the first championship for the club, which was founded in 1965. In 2001 he moved to Sweden to Ljusdals BK. The move to Bollnäs GoIF followed in 2004. With Bollnäs he won the World Championship in 2005. In 2007/08 he played one season in Russia in Krasnogorsk with Zorki and was Russian runner-up there. After the season he returned to Bollnäs. In 2010 and 2011 he reached the final of the Swedish bandy championship with the club, with Bollnäs losing both times.

Aaltonen has played for the Finnish national team since the winter of 2001/02. In 2004 he became world champion with a 5–4 win after Finland's golden goal against Sweden. He has already played over 100 international matches for the national team.

In 2009 and 2010 he received the award of the best bandy player in Finland.
