= Johan Östblom =

Swedish bandy player (born 1982)

Personal information
- Date of birth: 21 April 1982 (age 42)
- Playing position: Midfielder

Club information
- Current team: SKA-Neftyanik

Youth career
- Örebro SK

Senior career*
| Years | Team | Apps^{†} | (Gls)^{†} |
| 1999–2002 | Västerås SK | | |
| 2002–2004 | Bollnäs GIF | | |
| 2004–2008 | Västerås SK | | |
| 2008–2012 | Hammarby IF | | |
| 2012–2014 | Sandvikens AIK | | |
| 2014–2015 | SKA-Neftyanik | | |
| 2005–2016 | Hammarby IF | | |
| 2017– | AIK | | |
- * Senior club appearances and goals counted for the domestic league only. † Appearances (Goals).

Johan Östblom (born 21 April 1982) is a Swedish bandy player who plays for the AIK. He primarily plays as a midfielder but can also play as a defender. In 2014, Östblom became the third player (after Ola Johansson and Stefan Karlsson) to win three Swedish championships with three clubs.

He is the cousin of Swedish footballer Kim Källström.

== Club career ==
Johan Östblom was a youth product of Örebro SK but moved to Västerås SK before making a first team appearance. In Sweden, he has played for Örebro SK, Västerås SK, Bollnäs GIF, Hammarby IF, Sandvikens AIK.

In 2014, Östberg joined Russian Bandy Super League team SKA-Neftyanik.
