= Kalix BF =

Bandy club in Kalix, Sweden

- City: Kalix, Sweden
- League: Allsvenskan
- Founded: 2 May 1990; 36 years ago
- Home arena: Kalix IP
- Head coach: Tommy Andersson
- Website: kalixbandy.se
| Home colours | Away colours |

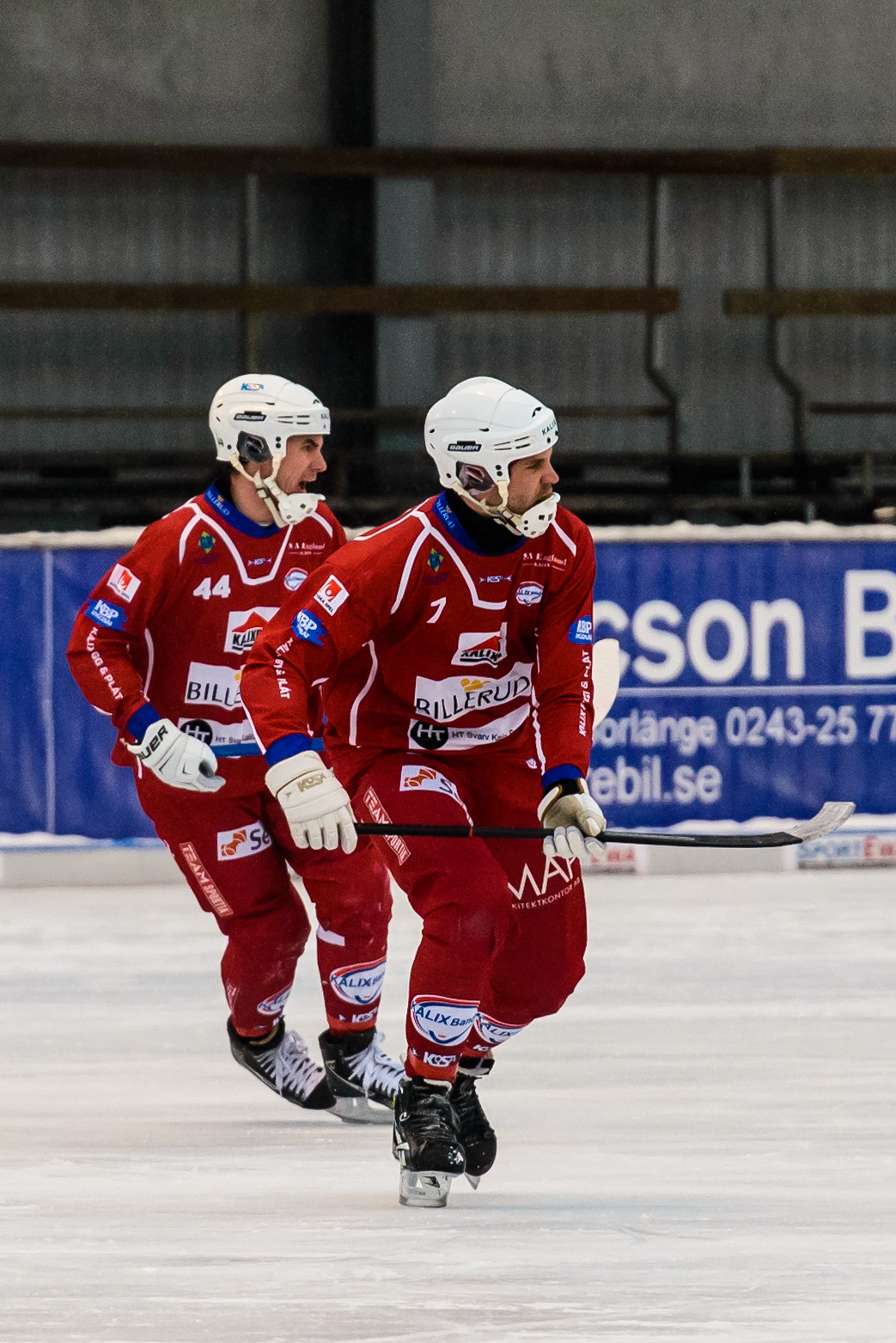
Kalix BF players Magnus Johansson and Peter Stock in January 2013

Kalix Bandyförening is a bandy club from Kalix, Sweden, founded on 2 May 1990. The club has been playing in the top-tier of Swedish bandy, Elitserien, in the 2011–12 season and then again since the 2013–14 season.

Supporters of the club often just call the club KB. The club was founded as Kalix Nyborg BK, by fusioning the bandy departments of the clubs Nyborgs SK and IFK Kalix. The name "Kalix BF" was adopted on 20 June 2001. Nyborgs SK has later started a new bandy department of its own.

== See also ==
- Category:Kalix BF players
