= Andreas Westh =

Swedish bandy player

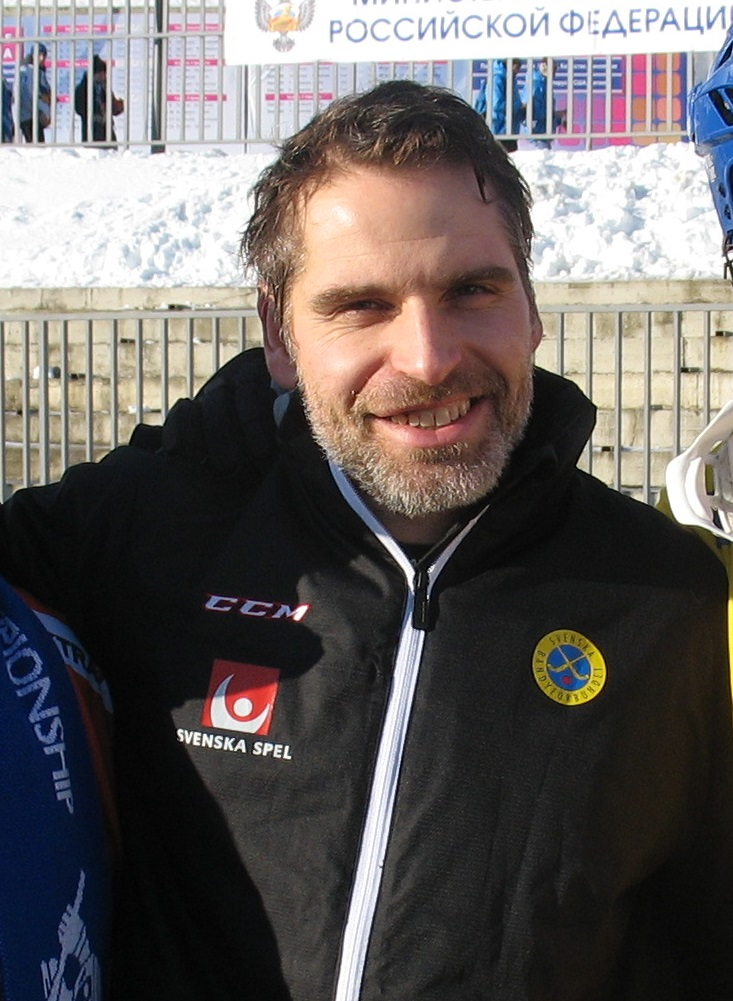

Personal information
- Date of birth: 22 May 1977 (age 47)
- Playing position: Sweeper

Club information
- Current team: Bollnäs
- Number: 5

Youth career
- Bollnäs

Senior career*
Years	Team	Apps^{†}	(Gls)^{†}
1994–2003	Bollnäs		
2003–2006	Sandviken		
2006–	Bollnäs		

National team
- Sweden
Medal record
Men's bandy
Representing Sweden
World Championships
Gold medal – first place	2005 Kazan	Team
Gold medal – first place	2009 Västerås	Team
Gold medal – first place	2010 Moscow	Team
Gold medal – first place	2012 Almaty	Team
Gold medal – first place	2017 Sandviken	Team
Silver medal – second place	2007 Kemerovo	Team
Silver medal – second place	2014 Irkutsk	Team
Silver medal – second place	2018 Khabarovsk	Team
- * Senior club appearances and goals counted for the domestic league only. † Appearances (Goals).

Andreas Westh (born 22 May 1977) is a Swedish bandy sweeper who currently plays for Elitserien side Bollnäs GIF.

== Career ==
=== Club career ===
Westh is a youth product of Bollnäs and has represented their senior team and Sandviken.

=== International career ===
Westh was part of Swedish World Champions teams of 2005, 2009, 2010, 2012, and 2017.

== Honours ==
=== Country ===
Sweden

- Bandy World Championship: 2005, 2009, 2010, 2012, 2017
