= Anders Svensson (bandy) =

Swedish bandy player (born 1975)

Personal information
- Date of birth: 11 June 1975 (age 49)
- Playing position: Goalkeeper

Club information
- Current team: Edsbyn
- Number: 21

Youth career
- IFK Rättvik

Senior career*
Years	Team	Apps^{†}	(Gls)^{†}
1993–1994	Ljusdal		
1994–1995	IFK Rättvik		
1995–2012	Edsbyn		
2012–2014	Dynamo Kazan		
2014–2015	Volga		
2015–	Edsbyn		

National team
- Sweden
Medal record
Men's bandy
Representing Sweden
World Championships
Gold medal – first place	2005 Kazan	Team
Gold medal – first place	2009 Västerås	Team
Gold medal – first place	2010 Moscow	Team
Gold medal – first place	2012 Almaty	Team
Silver medal – second place	2007 Kemerovo	Team
Silver medal – second place	2014 Irkutsk	Team
Silver medal – second place	2018 Khabarovsk	Team
- * Senior club appearances and goals counted for the domestic league only. † Appearances (Goals).

Anders Svensson (born 11 June 1975) is a Swedish bandy player who currently plays for Edsbyn as a goalkeeper.

== Career ==
=== Club career ===
Svensson is a youth product of IFK Rättvik and has represented Ljusdal, IFK Rättvik, Edsbyn, Dynamo Kazan, and Volga.

=== International career ===
Svensson was part of Swedish World Champions teams of 2005, 2009, 2010, and 2012.

== Honours ==
=== Country ===
Sweden

- Bandy World Championship: 2005, 2009, 2010, 2012
