= David Karlsson (bandy) =

Swedish bandy player

Personal information
- Born: 24 April 1981 (age 45)
- Playing position: Forward

Club information
- Current team: Villa Lidköping BK
- Number: 10

Youth career
- Eskilstuna BS

Senior career*
Years	Team	Apps^{†}	(Gls)^{†}
1996–1997	Eskilstuna BS		
1999–2002	Vetlanda BK		
2002–2005	Hammarby IF		
2006–2007	Uralsky Trubnik		
2007	Zorky		
2007	Zorky-2		
2008–2010	Hammarby IF		
2010–	Villa Lidköping BK		

National team
2004–	Sweden		
Medal record
Men's bandy
Representing Sweden
World Championships
Gold medal – first place	2005 Kazan	Team
Silver medal – second place	2007 Kemerovo	Team
- * Senior club appearances and goals counted for the domestic league only. † Appearances (Goals).

David Karlsson (born 24 April 1981) is a Swedish bandy player who currently plays for Villa Lidköping BK as a striker. David has played for Sweden's national team since the 2004–05 season. He stood out by scoring 16 goals during the Bandy World Championship 2007.
