= Per Hellmyrs =

Swedish bandy player

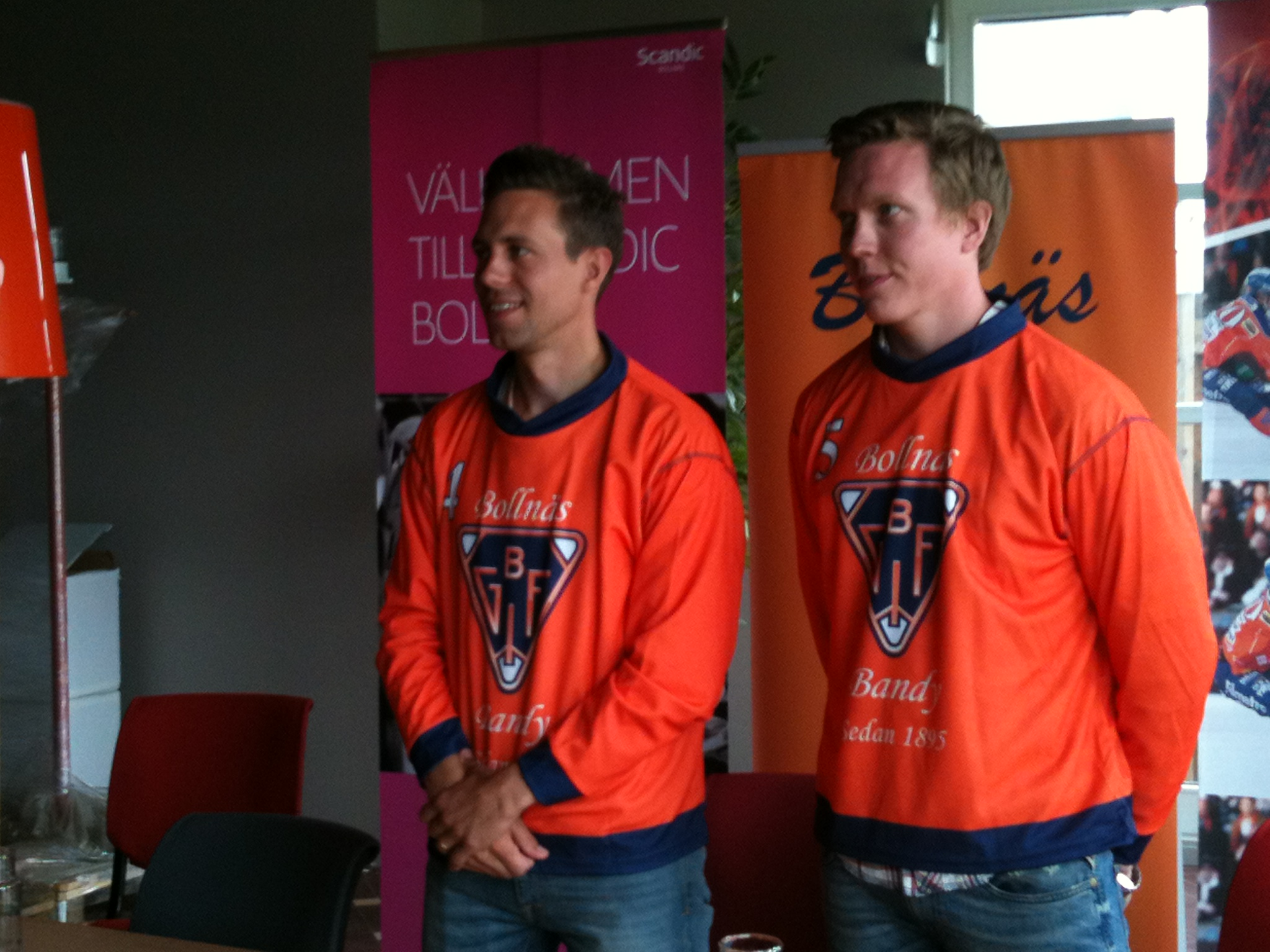
- Per Hellmyrs and teammate Daniel Berlin in 2014.

Personal information
- Date of birth: 18 March 1983 (age 42)
- Playing position: Midfielder

Club information
- Current team: Edsbyn
- Number: 4

Youth career
- Edsbyn

Senior career*
Years	Team	Apps^{†}	(Gls)^{†}
2000–2007	Edsbyn		
2007–2008	Raketa		
2008–2009	Edsbyn		
2009–2012	Bollnäs		
2012–2014	Dynamo Moscow		
2014–2021	Bollnäs		
2021-	Edsbyn		

National team
- Sweden
Medal record
Men's bandy
Representing Sweden
World Championships
Gold medal – first place	2005 Kazan	Team
Gold medal – first place	2009 Västerås	Team
Gold medal – first place	2010 Moscow	Team
Gold medal – first place	2012 Almaty	Team
Gold medal – first place	2017 Sandviken	Team
Silver medal – second place	2007 Kemerovo	Team
Silver medal – second place	2014 Irkutsk	Team
Silver medal – second place	2018 Khabarovsk	Team
- * Senior club appearances and goals counted for the domestic league only. † Appearances (Goals).

Per Hellmyrs (born 18 March 1983) is a Swedish professional bandy player who is a creative midfielder.

== Career ==
=== Club career ===
Hellmyrs was brought up by Edsbyns IF and has represented their senior team, the Russian club Raketa, Swedish club Bollnäs and Russian club Dynamo Moscow. He is one of very few players who have gone from representing Edsbyn to representing Bollnäs, two clubs with a traditional rivalry between them.

=== International career ===
Hellmyrs was part of Swedish World Champion teams of 2005, 2009, 2010, 2012, and 2017.

== Honours ==
=== International ===
Sweden

- Bandy World Championship: 2005, 2009, 2010, 2012, 2017

=== National ===
- Man of the Year in Swedish Bandy, 2009
- Swedish Champion, 5 (2004, 2005, 2006, 2007, 2008, all with Edsbyn)
- Russian Champion, 1 (2013, with Dynamo Moscow)
