= Olov Englund =

Swedish bandy player

Personal information
- Date of birth: 5 March 1983 (age 42)
Medal record
Men's bandy
Representing Sweden
World Championships
Gold medal – first place	2009 Västerås	Team
Gold medal – first place	2010 Moscow	Team
Gold medal – first place	2012 Almaty	Team
Silver medal – second place	2007 Kemerovo	Team

Olov Englund (born 5 March 1983) is a Swedish bandy player who currently plays for Kalix Bandy as a defender. Englund is now a member of Sweden's national team and started playing in the Bandy World Championship 2007.

Though his career, Englund has only played for three clubs. His list of clubs is as follows-

(Sweden) Kalix Bandy (1999–2004)
(Sweden) Hammarby IF (2004–2007)
(Russia) Zorky (2007–2008)
(Sweden) Hammarby IF (2008–2013)
(Sweden) Kalix Bandy (2013–present)
