= Magnus Muhrén =

Swedish bandy coach and former player (born 1974)

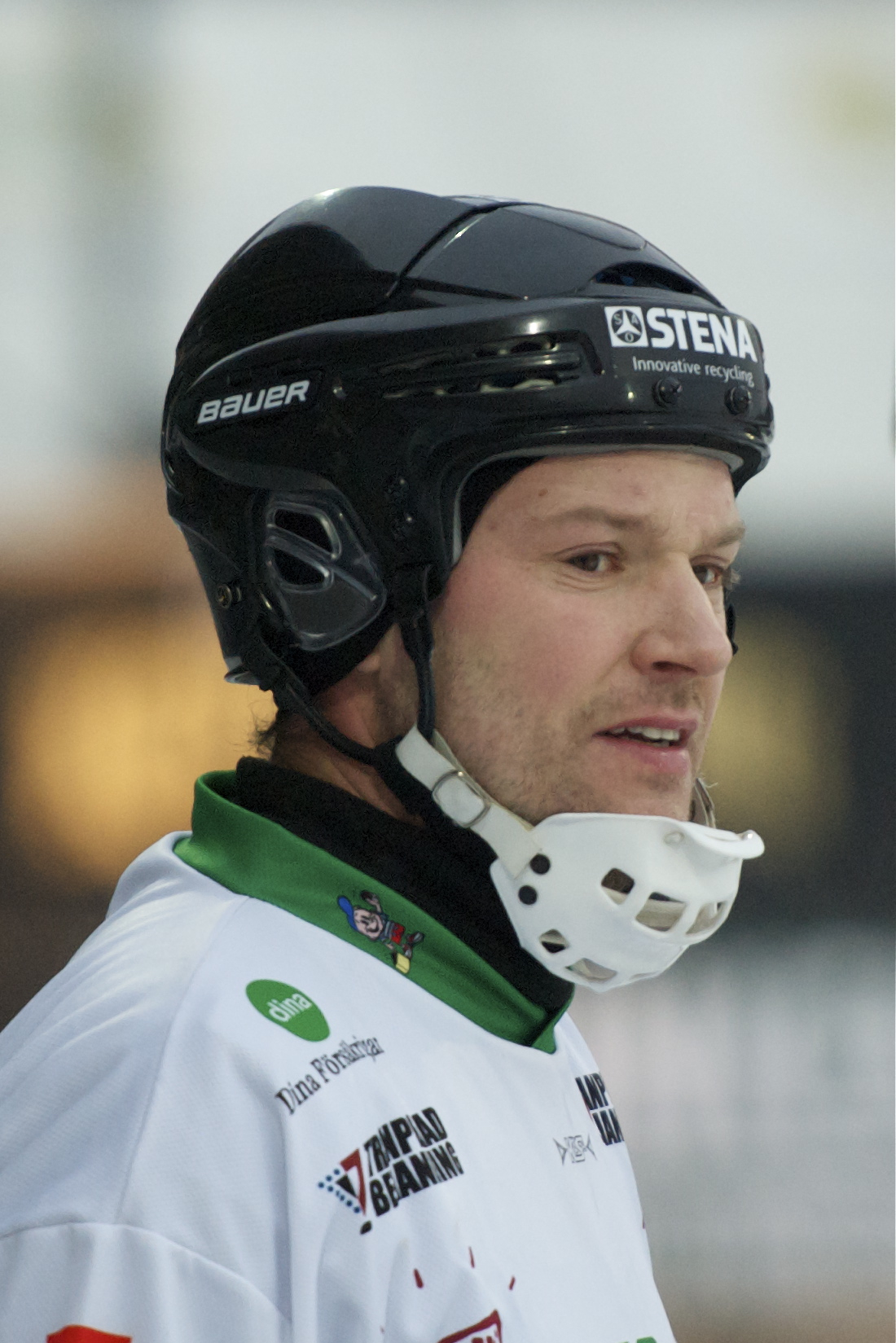
- Magnus Muhrén in 2012.

Personal information
- Date of birth: 4 November 1974 (age 50)
- Playing position: Forward

Club information
- Current team: Sandvikens AIK (coach)

Senior career*
Years	Team	Apps^{†}	(Gls)^{†}
1992–1993	Skutskärs IF		
1993–2005	Sandvikens AIK		
2005–2006	Zorky		
2006–2007	Dynamo Moscow		
2006–2007	Raketa		
2007–2010	Sandvikens AIK		
2010–2013	GAIS		
2013–2014	Sandvikens AIK		

National team
- Sweden

Teams managed
- 2017–: Sandvikens AIK
Medal record
Men's bandy
Representing Sweden
World Championships
Gold medal – first place	1997 Sweden	Team
Gold medal – first place	2003 Arkhangelsk	Team
Gold medal – first place	2005 Kazan	Team
Gold medal – first place	2009 Västerås	Team
Silver medal – second place	2007 Kemerovo	Team
- * Senior club appearances and goals counted for the domestic league only. † Appearances (Goals).

Magnus Muhrén (born 4 November 1974) is a Swedish bandy coach and former player, who played as a forward.

== Career ==
=== Club career ===
He started his career with Skutskärs IF and later played for Sandvikens AIK, Zorky Krasnogorsk, Dynamo Kazan, Dynamo Moscow, and GAIS.

=== International career ===
Muhrén was part of Swedish World Champion teams of 1997, 2003, 2005, and 2009.

=== Managerial career ===
In 2017, Muhrén took over Sandvikens AIK.

== Honours ==
=== Country ===
Sweden

- Bandy World Championship: 1997, 2003, 2005, 2009
