= Daniel Berlin =

Swedish bandy player

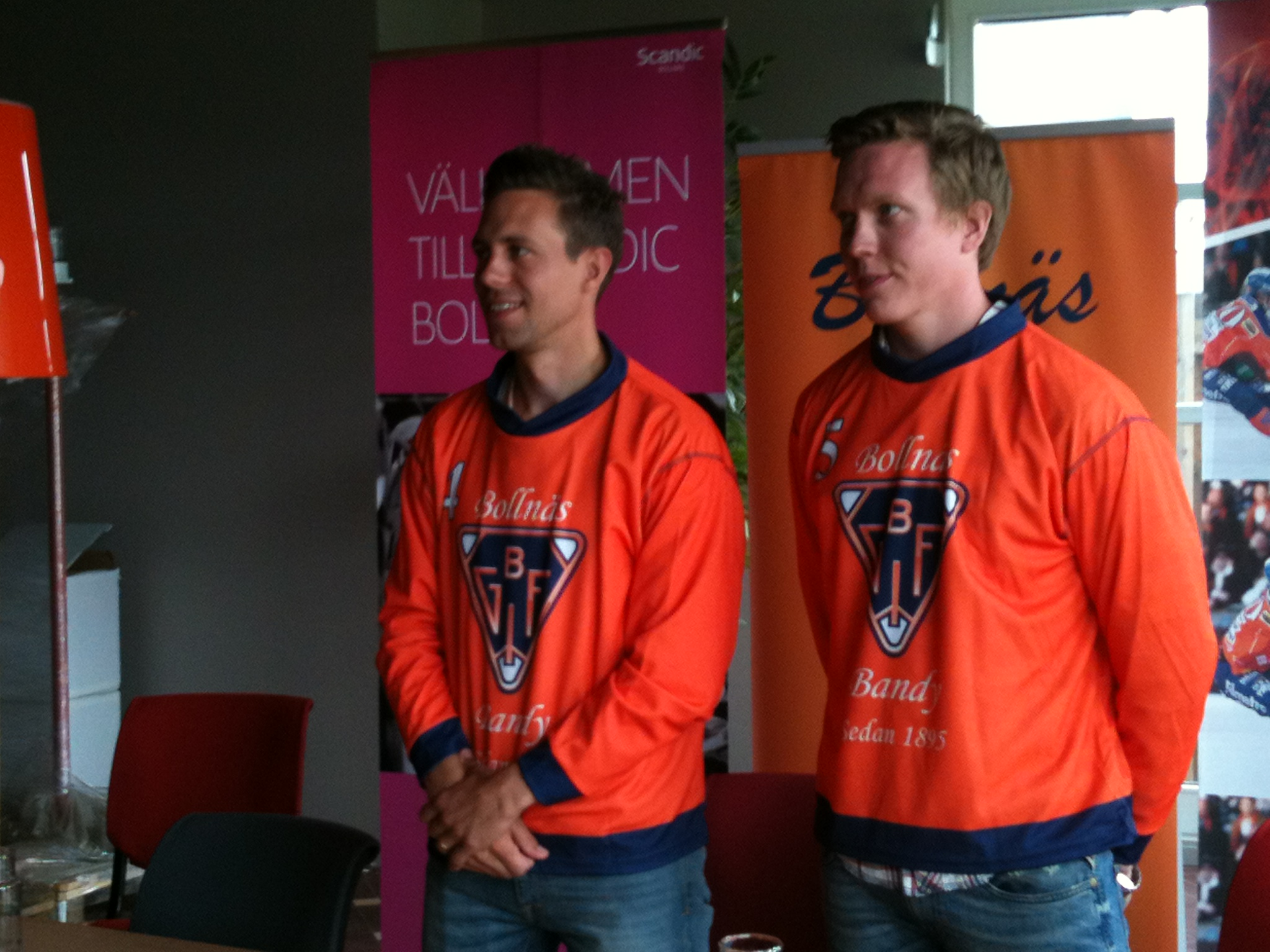
- Per Hellmyrs and Daniel Berlin in 2014.

Personal information
- Born: 22 March 1987 (age 38)
- Playing position: Midfielder

Club information
- Current team: Sandviken
- Number: 6

Youth career
- Sirius

Senior career*
Years	Team	Apps^{†}	(Gls)^{†}
2004–2012	Sandviken		
2012–2014	Dynamo Moscow		
2014–2017	Bollnäs GIF		
2017–	Sandviken		

National team
- Sweden
Medal record
Men's bandy
Representing Sweden
World Championships
Gold medal – first place	2009 Västerås	Team
Gold medal – first place	2010 Moscow	Team
Gold medal – first place	2012 Almaty	Team
Gold medal – first place	2017 Sandviken	Team
Silver medal – second place	2014 Irkutsk	Team
Silver medal – second place	2018 Khabarovsk	Team
- * Senior club appearances and goals counted for the domestic league only. † Appearances (Goals).

Daniel Berlin (born 22 March 1987) is a Swedish bandy player who currently plays for Sandvikens AIK as a midfielder/winger.

== Career ==
=== Club career ===
Berlin is a youth product of Sirius and has represented Sandviken, Dynamo Moscow, and Bollnäs GIF.

=== International career ===
Berlin was part of Swedish World Champions teams of 2009, 2010, 2012, and 2017.

== Honours ==
=== Country ===
Sweden

- Bandy World Championship: 2009, 2010, 2012, 2017
