= Joakim Hedqvist =

Swedish bandy player

Personal information
- Date of birth: 22 November 1977 (age 47)
Medal record
Men's bandy
Representing Sweden
World Championships
Gold medal – first place	2009 Västerås	Team

Joakim Hedqvist (born 22 November 1977) is a Swedish professional bandy player, who currently plays for Edsbyns IF in Elitserien, the top division of Swedish bandy, with whom he has won five consecutive Swedish championships.

During the season 2008/2009 he started to represent the Russian team HK Zorky. He ended the contract before the intended time and returned to Sweden and play with Edsbyns IF.

He made his international début in Bandy World Championship 2009 where the Swedish team won gold medals and Hedqvist ended on top of the scoring table together with Jevgenij Ivanusjkin on 14 goals.

== Clubs ==
- 2008/2009- (Sweden) Edsbyns IF
- 2008/2009-2008/2009 HK Zorkij, Russia
- 2007/2008-2004/2005 (Sweden) Edsbyns IF
- 2003/2004-2002/2003 (Sweden) Broberg/Söderhamn Bandy
- 2001/2002-2000/2001 (Sweden) Edsbyns IF
- 1999/2000-1993/1994 (Sweden) Broberg/Söderhamn Bandy
