= Stefan Erixon =

Swedish bandy player (born 1977)

Personal information
- Born: 1 December 1977 (age 48)

Youth career
- Gamleby

Senior career*
Years	Team	Apps^{†}	(Gls)^{†}
1995–1996	Gamleby		
1996–2002	IFK Motala		
2002–2007	Hammarby		
2007–2008	Zorky		
2008–2015	Hammarby		
2016–2019	Tjust Bandy		

National team
- Sweden
Medal record
Men's bandy
Representing Sweden
World Championships
Gold medal – first place	2003 Arkhangelsk	Team
Gold medal – first place	2005 Kazan	Team
Gold medal – first place	2009 Västerås	Team
Gold medal – first place	2010 Moscow	Team
Gold medal – first place	2012 Almaty	Team
Silver medal – second place	2007 Kemerovo	Team
- * Senior club appearances and goals counted for the domestic league only. † Appearances (Goals).

Stefan Erixon (born 1 December 1977) is a Swedish former bandy player.

== Career ==
=== Club career ===
Erixon is a youth product of Gamleby and represented their senior team, IFK Motala, Hammarby before joining Zorky in 2007. In December 2008, his contract with Zorky was terminated because of the club's financial problems. Erixon then returned to Hammarby and played there until 2015.

=== International career ===
Erixon has played for the Swedish national bandy team, making his debut in the 2001–02 season. Erixon was part of Swedish World Champion teams of 2003, 2005, 2009, 2010 and 2012.

== Honours ==
=== Country ===
Sweden

- Bandy World Championship: 2003, 2005, 2009, 2010, 2012
