= IFK Kungälv =

- City: Kungälv, Sweden
- League: Allsvenskan
- Founded: 1940; 85 years ago
- Home arena: Skarpe Nord

IFK Kungälv is a sports club in Kungälv in Sweden, founded in 1940, and mostly concentrated on the sport of bandy. The club has been playing in the Swedish bandy top division Elitserien for many seasons, at present since 2008/09.

The home kit is a red jersey, blue trousers, and red socks. The home arena is Skarpe Nord. The supporter club is called Skarpa Gubbar.

As all IFK clubs in Sweden, IFK Kungälv is a member of Idrottsföreningen Kamraterna.

On 8 April 2016 it was announced that the club had not fulfilled the requirements for elite licence and therefore was kicked out of Elitserien from the 2016–17 season, with two weeks of possibility to appeal against the denial. On 26 April 2016, it was announced that the appeal had been rejected by the Swedish Bandy Association. Instead, IK Tellus took their place.

== See also ==
- Category:IFK Kungälv players
