= Broberg/Söderhamn Bandy =

Bandy club in Söderhamn, Sweden

- City: Söderhamn, Sweden
- League: Elitserien
- Founded: 19 April 1919; 106 years ago
- Home arena: Hällåsen
- Head coach: Daniel Skarps
- Website: brobergsoderhamn.se
Home colours	Away colours

Broberg/Söderhamn Bandy is a Swedish bandy club from Söderhamn who play in the Elitserien. Broberg/Söderhamn, also known as Brobergs IF, was founded on 19 April 1919. Broberg play their home matches at Hällåsen.

Broberg have won the Bandy World Cup 4 times in 1975, 1977, 1978 and 1983. They have also been runners-up twice in 1974 and 1981. They have also won the Swedish Championship final five times in 1947, 1963, 1964, 1976 and 1977.

== History ==
Broberg/Söderhamn Bandy was founded in 1919.

In December 1979, the club played the first bandy game in the USA, a friendly game against the Swedish junior national team in Edina, Minnesota.

== Honours ==
=== Domestic ===
- Swedish Champions:
  - Winners (5): 1947, 1963, 1964, 1976, 1977
  - Runners-up (5): 1948, 1965, 1966, 1969, 1979

== See also ==
- Category:Broberg/Söderhamn Bandy players
