= IFK Motala =

- City: Motala, Sweden
- League: Elitserien
- Founded: 1932; 93 years ago
- Home arena: Motala Isstadion
- Head coach: Mattias Sjöholm
- Website: ifkmotalabandy.se
Home colours	Away colours

IFK Motala is a sports club in Motala, Sweden, founded in 1932 and practicing bandy and soccer. IFK Motala's bandy team currently plays in Elitserien, and home games are played at the Motala Isstadion. The club won the men's Swedish Bandy Championship in 1987.

== History ==
IFK Motala was founded in 1932. On 26 April 2024 the bandy team announced its withdrawal from Elitserien for the 2024–2025, following Motala Municipality rejecting construction of an indoor arena. Instead, the team would voluntary be regulated to Division 1.

== Honours ==
=== Domestic ===
- Swedish Champions:
  - Winners (1): 1987
  - Runners-up (1): 1985
