= 2003 Bandy World Championship =

23rd Bandy World Championship

Tournament details
- Host country: Russia
- City: Arkhangelsk
- Dates: 24 – 30 March
- Teams: 9

Final positions
- Champions: Sweden
- Runners-up: Russia
- Third place: Kazakhstan
- Fourth place: Finland

Tournament statistics
- Games played: 23
- Scoring leader(s): Ari Holopainen, Finland (10 points)

The 2003 Bandy World Championship was a competition for bandy playing nations for men. The championship was played in Arkhangelsk, Russia from 24 to 30 March 2003. Sweden won the championship. There were 9 countries participating in the 2003 championships: Finland, Kazakhstan, Norway, Russia, Sweden (group A) and Belarus, Estonia, the Netherlands and the United States (group B).

The competition was originally intended to be played in Norway. However, on 7 January 2002, the Bandy Association of Norway met and decided to not host the competition. Both Russia and Sweden showed their interest to host. The decision fell on Russia. By playing the tournament in late March, severe cold was avoided, unlike the 1999 World Championship when the tournament was played in late January and early February.

== Group A ==
- Sweden
- Russia
- Finland
- Kazakhstan
- Norway

== Premier tour ==
- 24 March

Finland – Kazakhstan 4 – 2
Russia – Norway 8 – 1

- 25 March

Sweden – Finland 9 – 4
Kazakhstan – Russia 3 – 12

- 26 March

Norway – Kazakhstan 5 – 6
Russia – Sweden 2 – 6

- 27 March

Finland – Norway 5 – 1
Sweden – Kazakhstan 6 – 1

- 28 March

Sweden – Norway 6 – 2
Russia – Finland 5 – 1

Pos	Team	Pld	W	D	L	GF	GA	GD	Pts
1	Sweden	4	4	0	0	27	9	+18	8
2	Russia	4	3	0	1	27	11	+16	6
3	Finland	4	2	0	2	14	17	−3	4
4	Kazakhstan	4	1	0	3	12	27	−15	2
5	Norway	4	0	0	4	9	25	−16	0

== Final Tour ==
=== Semifinals ===
- 29 March

Semifinals

Russia – Finland 7 – 3
Sweden – Kazakhstan 6 – 1

=== Match for 3rd place ===
- 30 March

Finland – Kazakhstan 1 – 4

=== Final ===
- 30 March

Russia – Sweden 4 – 5

== Group B ==
- Belarus
- United States
- Estonia
- Netherlands

=== Premier tour ===
- 24 March

Estonia – Belarus 4 – 21

- 25 March

USA – Netherlands 18 – 0

- 26 March

Netherlands – Estonia 3 – 7

- 27 March

USA – Belarus 4 – 6

- 28 March

Estonia – USA 0 – 15

- 29 March

Netherlands – Belarus 1 – 9

Pos	Team	Pld	W	D	L	GF	GA	GD	Pts
1	Belarus	3	3	0	0	36	9	+27	6
2	United States	3	2	0	1	37	6	+31	4
3	Estonia	3	1	0	2	11	39	−28	2
4	Netherlands	3	0	0	3	4	34	−30	0

== Play off matches ==
=== Match for 7th Place ===
- February 28

USA – Estonia 19–3

== Match for 5th place ==
- February 28

Norway – Belarus 7–3
