= 2005 Bandy World Championship =

Tournament details
- Host country: Russia
- Dates: 30 January – 6 February
- Teams: 11

Final positions
- Champions: Sweden (8th title)
- Runners-up: Russia
- Third place: Kazakhstan
- Fourth place: Finland

Tournament statistics
- Games played: 32
- Scoring leader(s): Sergey Obukhov, Russia (20 points)

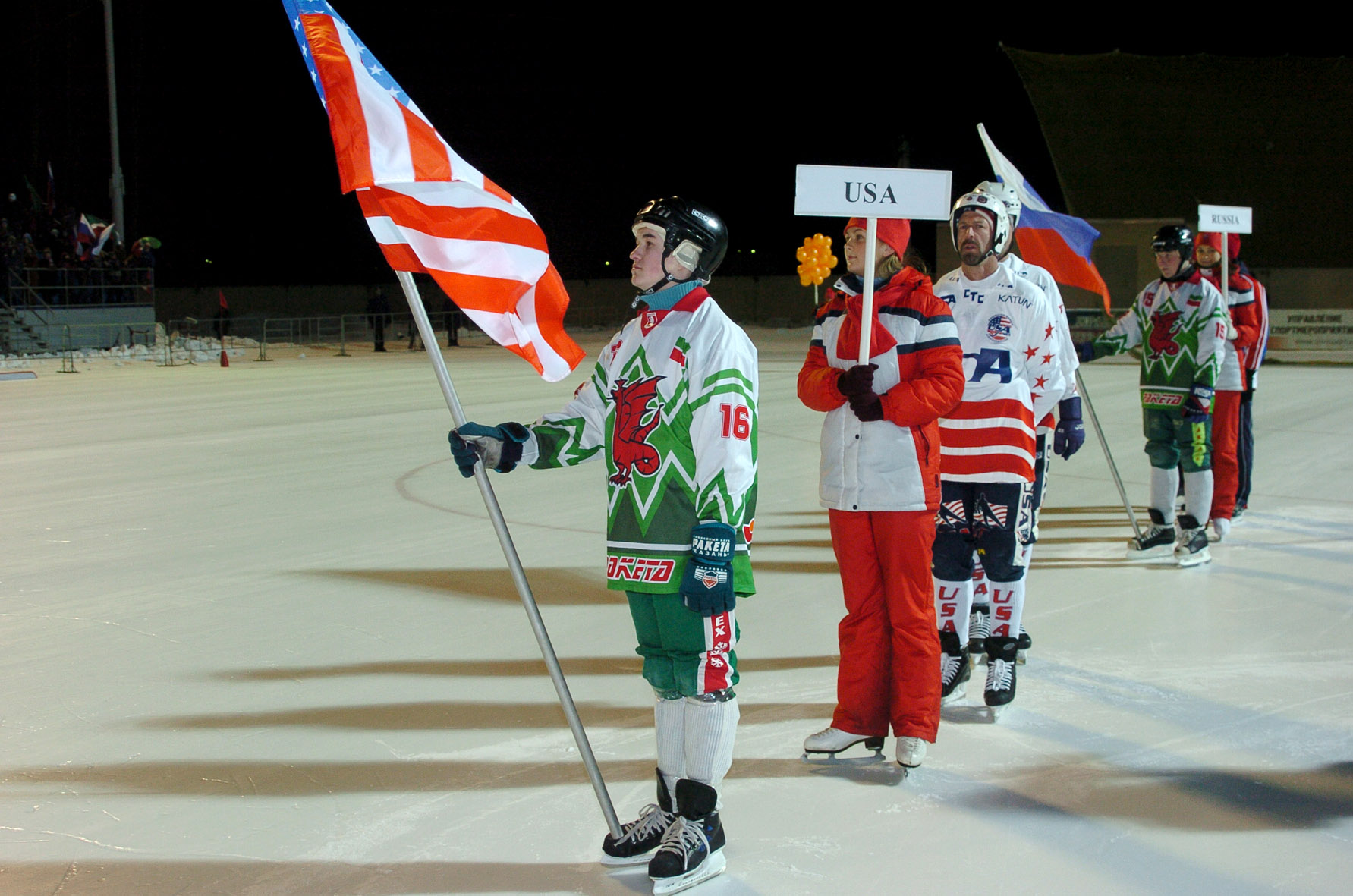
Scene from the opening ceremony

The 2005 Bandy World Championship was played by 11 men's national bandy teams in Russia from 30 January to 6 February 2005. Sweden became world champions.

== Group A ==
- Russia
- Finland
- Sweden
- Kazakhstan
- Norway
- United States

=== Premier tour ===
- 30 January
- 11.00 Finland – Kazakhstan 2–2 (6–4 after penalties)
- 14.00 Sweden – Norway 6–2
- 19.00 Russia – United States 19–1
- 31 January
- 11.00 Kazakhstan – Norway 19–1
- 14.00 United States – Sweden 2–20
- 19.00 Finland – Russia 2–6
- 1 February
- 11.00 Sweden – Kazakhstan 7–5
- 14.00 United States – Finland 0–15
- 19.00 Norway – Russia 0–22
- 2 February
- 11.00 United States – Kazakhstan 1–17
- 14.00 Norway – Finland 3–11
- 19.00 Russia – Sweden 5–3
- 4 February
- 11.00 Norway – United States 7–2
- 14.00 Kazakhstan – Russia 2–14
- 19.00 Sweden – Finland 7–5

Pos	Team	Pld	W	D	L	GF	GA	GD	Pts	Qualification
1	Russia	5	5	0	0	66	8	+58	10	Semifinals
2	Sweden	5	4	0	1	43	19	+24	8	Semifinals
3	Finland	5	2	1	2	35	18	+17	5	Semifinals
4	Kazakhstan	5	2	1	2	35	25	+10	5	Semifinals
5	Norway	5	1	0	4	13	50	−37	2	
6	United States	5	0	0	5	6	78	−72	0	Divisions A/B playoff

=== Final Tour ===
==== Semifinals ====
- 5 February
- 16.00 Semifinal – Russia – Kazakhstan 10–3
- 19.00 Semifinal – Sweden – Finland, 6–2

==== Match for 3rd place ====
- 6 February
- 11.00 Finland – Kazakhstan 3–5

==== Final ====
- 6 February
- 16.00 Russia – Sweden 2–5

== Group B ==
- Belarus
- Canada
- Netherlands
- Estonia
- Hungary

=== Premier tour ===
- 30 January
- 10.00 Hungary – Canada 2–9
- 13.00 Belarus – Netherlands 6–1
- 31 January
- 10.00 Estonia – Belarus 5–18
- 13.00 Netherlands – Canada 1–8
- February 1
- 10.00 Canada – Estonia 18–0
- 13.00 Hungary – Netherlands 4–5
- February 2
- 10.00 Netherlands – Estonia 9–1
- 13.00 Belarus – Hungary 18–1
- February 4
- 10.00 Estonia – Hungary 2–10
- 13.00 Canada – Belarus 4–4 (6–7 after penalties)

Pos	Team	Pld	W	D	L	GF	GA	GD	Pts	Qualification
1	Belarus	4	3	1	0	46	11	+35	7	Divisions A/B playoff
2	Canada	4	3	1	0	39	7	+32	7	Match for 2nd place
3	Netherlands	4	2	0	2	16	19	−3	4	Match for 2nd place
4	Hungary	4	1	0	3	17	34	−17	2	Match for 4th place
5	Estonia	4	0	0	4	8	55	−47	0	Match for 4th place

=== Play-off matches ===
==== Match for 4th place ====
- February 5
- 10.00 Hungary – Estonia 2–3

==== Match for 2nd place ====
- February 5
- 13.00 Canada – Netherlands 12–3

==== A-group qualification match ====
- February 5
- Belarus – United States 6–3
