= List of Swedish bandy championship finals (1950–1999) =

The Swedish bandy championship final is a yearly event concluding the bandy season in Sweden and deciding the Swedish bandy champions.

From 1907 to 1930, the finalists were decided from a cup tournament and from 1931 the finalists have been decided from a play-off tournament of the top-tier of the Swedish bandy league system.

The first final was held in 1907, when IFK Uppsala beat IFK Gävle with 4–1 in Boulognerskogen, Gävle.

In 1912, two winners were declared, because no replay of the tied final could be played due to the weather.

Below is a list of finals from 1950 to 1999.

== 1950 ==
19 February 1950

Västerås SK	2–1	Sandvikens AIK
Widén; Vallo	Report	Ask

Stockholm Olympic Stadium, Stockholm
Attendance: 27,047
Referee: Gustaf Orstadios

Västerås SK
(Sweden) Henry Engström	GK
(Sweden) Tage Sjöstrand
(Sweden) Gösta Andersson
(Sweden) Arne Lundberg
(Sweden) Erik Flodin
(Sweden) Lars Pettersson
(Sweden) Gunnar Jansson
(Sweden) Åke Magnusson
(Sweden) Henry Ohlsson
(Sweden) Pontus Widén	(1)
(Sweden) Ture Vallo	(1)

Sandvikens AIK
(Sweden) Gudmund Jernberg	(1)
(Sweden) Nils Hellström
(Sweden) Axel Johansson
(Sweden) Gunnar Zackrisson
(Sweden) Ernst Lindborg
(Sweden) Rune Pettersson
(Sweden) Rolf Söderberg
(Sweden) Torvald Åkerlöf
(Sweden) Ejnar Ask	(1)
(Sweden) John Andersson
(Sweden) Agard Magnusson

== 1951 ==
25 February 1951

Bollnäs GIF	3–2	Örebro SK
Wickman; Andersson; H. Johansson	Report	Sääw (2)

Stockholm Olympic Stadium, Stockholm
Attendance: 27,869
Referee: Rune Igesten

Bollnäs GIF
(Sweden) Yngve Palmqvist	GK
(Sweden) Georg Fredin
(Sweden) Bengt Jonsson
(Sweden) Karl-Erik Sjöberg
(Sweden) Gösta Nordgren
(Sweden) Åke Mickelsson
(Sweden) Martin Johansson
(Sweden) Nils Wickman	(1)
(Sweden) Per-Olof Andersson	(1)
(Sweden) Ebbe Larsson
(Sweden) Henry Johansson	(1)

Örebro SK
(Sweden) Karl-Ivar Ekberg	GK
(Sweden) Orvar Bergmark
(Sweden) Erik Svensson
(Sweden) Sten Carlsson
(Sweden) Algot Gäwert
(Sweden) Sven Bergström
(Sweden) Ove Eidhagen
(Sweden) Tage Magnusson
(Sweden) Georg Gustafsson
(Sweden) Olle Sääw	(2)
(Sweden) Hilding Hanell

== 1952 ==
17 February 1952

Edsbyns IF	1–0	IF Göta
Nyberg	Report

Stockholm Olympic Stadium, Stockholm
Attendance: 25,965
Referee: Eric W. Johansson

Edsbyns IF
(Sweden) Gudmund Jernberg	GK
(Sweden) Torkel Berglund
(Sweden) Birger Persson
(Sweden) Sven Prim
(Sweden) Herbert Swartswe
(Sweden) Sven-Olof Landar
(Sweden) Ivar Persson
(Sweden) Kurt Nyberg	(1)
(Sweden) Paul Karlsson
(Sweden) Allan Arvidsson
(Sweden) Elis Johansson

IF Göta
(Sweden) Rune Eriksson	GK
(Sweden) Lars Westerdahl
(Sweden) Erik Augustsson-Renneby
(Sweden) Karl-Erik Karlsson
(Sweden) John Lerin
(Sweden) Gunnar Malmborg
(Sweden) Nils Jansson
(Sweden) Tore Olsson
(Sweden) Roy Berglöf
(Sweden) Hugo Hansson
(Sweden) Nils Eriksson

== 1953 ==
22 February 1953

Edsbyns IF	4–4	Nässjö IF
Nyberg (2); I. Persson; Johansson	Report	Wennerholm (2); Bergström; Igesten

Stockholm Olympic Stadium, Stockholm
Attendance: 27,428
Referee: Edvin Granqvist

Edsbyns IF
(Sweden) Gudmund Jernberg	GK
(Sweden) Torkel Berglund
(Sweden) Birger Persson
(Sweden) Sven Prim
(Sweden) Herberg Swartswe
(Sweden) Sven-Olof Landar
(Sweden) Ivar Persson	(1)
(Sweden) Kurt Nyberg	(2)
(Sweden) Paul Karlsson
(Sweden) Allan Arvidsson
(Sweden) Elis Johansson	(1)

Nässjö IF
(Sweden) Olle Bergström	GK
(Sweden) Lars-Göran Wetterholm
(Sweden) Åke Igesten
(Sweden) Gösta Tollin
(Sweden) Roland Claesson
(Sweden) Ingemar Liw
(Sweden) Uno Wennerholm	(2)
(Sweden) Nils Bergström	(1)
(Sweden) Arnold Bergström
(Sweden) Arne Igesten	(1)
(Sweden) Enar Magnusson

1 March 1953
Replay

Edsbyns IF	5–1	Nässjö IF
Nyberg (2); I. Persson; Karlsson; Arvidsson	Report	Magnusson

Stockholm Olympic Stadium, Stockholm
Attendance: 21,053
Referee: Olle Gylén

Edsbyns IF
(Sweden) Gudmund Jernberg	GK
(Sweden) Torkel Berglund
(Sweden) Birger Persson
(Sweden) Sven Prim
(Sweden) Herberg Swartswe
(Sweden) Sven-Olof Landar
(Sweden) Ivar Persson	(1)
(Sweden) Kurt Nyberg	(2)
(Sweden) Paul Karlsson	(1)
(Sweden) Allan Arvidsson	(1)
(Sweden) Elis Johansson

Nässjö IF
(Sweden) Olle Bergström	GK
(Sweden) Lars-Göran Wetterholm
(Sweden) Åke Igesten
(Sweden) Gösta Tollin
(Sweden) Roland Claesson
(Sweden) Ingemar Liw
(Sweden) Uno Wennerholm
(Sweden) Nils Bergström
(Sweden) Arnold Bergström
(Sweden) Arne Igesten
(Sweden) Enar Magnusson	(1)

== 1954 ==
14 February 1954

Västanfors IF	1–1	Örebro SK
	Report Report

Stockholm Olympic Stadium, Stockholm
Attendance: 23,744
1954
Replay

Västanfors IF	2–1	Örebro SK
	Report

Tunavallen, Eskilstuna
Attendance: 17,895

== 1955 ==
1955

Örebro SK	7–1	Edsbyns IF
	Report

Stockholm Olympic Stadium, Stockholm
Attendance: 22,454

== 1956 ==
1956

Bollnäs GIF	3–2	Örebro SK
	Report

Stockholm Olympic Stadium, Stockholm
Attendance: 20,969

== 1957 ==
1957

Örebro SK	2–1	Hammarby IF
	Report

Stockholm Olympic Stadium, Stockholm
Attendance: 25,937

== 1958 ==
1958

Örebro SK	3–1	Edsbyns IF
	Report

Stockholm Olympic Stadium, Stockholm
Attendance: 18,767

== 1959 ==
1959

Skutskärs IF	2–1	Västerås SK
	Report

Stockholm Olympic Stadium, Stockholm
Attendance: 27,420

== 1960 ==
21 February 1960

Västerås SK	3–1	IK Sirius
Broberg; Pokosta; Andersson	Report	Lindström

Stockholm Olympic Stadium, Stockholm
Attendance: 24,179
Referee: Axel Schüberg & Bertil Andersson

Västerås SK
(Sweden) Nils-Olof Jonsson	GK
(Sweden) Henry Ohlsson
(Sweden) Ove Almroth
(Sweden) Bengt Berglind
(Sweden) Bernt Wasberg
(Sweden) Malte Eidhagen
(Sweden) Gunnar Jansson
(Sweden) Erik Berglund
(Sweden) Sven-Erik Broberg	(1)
(Sweden) Mischa Pokosta	(1)
(Sweden) Nils Andersson	(1)
(Sweden) Lennart Ferngren
(Sweden) Leif-Göte Eriksson
(Sweden) Stig Lindberg	GK

IK Sirius
(Sweden) Sigge Parling	GK
(Sweden) Lars Jönsson
(Sweden) Ulf Fredin
(Sweden) Tore Wikner
(Sweden) Sven-Åke Erixon
(Sweden) Göran Andersson
(Sweden) Stenåke Walltin
(Sweden) Gunnar Lindström	(1)
(Sweden) Ove Eidhagen
(Sweden) Rolf Larsson
(Sweden) Jarl Wahlberg
(Sweden) Ove Eklöf
(Sweden) Rolf Lindbom
(Sweden) Bo Åberg	GK

== 1961 ==
12 February 1961

IK Sirius	3–1	Edsbyns IF
Walltin; Eidhagen; Wahlberg	Report	Karlsson

Stockholm Olympic Stadium, Stockholm
Attendance: 19,190
Referee: Folke Johansson & Yngve Johansson

IK Sirius
(Sweden) Sigge Parling	GK
(Sweden) Göran Andersson
(Sweden) Ulf Fredin
(Sweden) Tore Wikner
(Sweden) Lars Jönsson
(Sweden) Rolf Larsson
(Sweden) Stenåke Walltin	(1)
(Sweden) Gunnar Åberg
(Sweden) Ove Eidhagen	(1)
(Sweden) Carl-Erik Akelöf
(Sweden) Jarl Wahlberg	(1)
(Sweden) Rolf Lindbom
(Sweden) Lars Hawé
(Sweden) Bo Ekström	GK

Edsbyns IF
(Sweden) Lennart Stålberg	GK
(Sweden) Harley Wennberg
(Sweden) Bernt Frid
(Sweden) Sven-Olof Landar
(Sweden) Paul Karlsson	(1)
(Sweden) Jörgen Forslund
(Sweden) Jan Åslund
(Sweden) Kurt Nyberg
(Sweden) Rolf Jonsson
(Sweden) Allan Arvidsson
(Sweden) Elis Johansson
(Sweden) Sven-Erik Jonsson
(Sweden) Bo Hedlund
(Sweden) Björn Swartswe
(Sweden) Lennart Häll	GK

== 1962 ==
18 February 1962

Edsbyns IF	3–2	IK Sirius
Swartswe; R. Jonsson; Nyberg	Report	Åberg; Eidhagen

Stockholm Olympic Stadium, Stockholm
Attendance: 14,023
Referee: Bengt Andrén & Åke Erixon

Edsbyns IF
(Sweden) Lennart Stålberg	GK
(Sweden) Harley Wennberg
(Sweden) Bernt Frid
(Sweden) Sven-Olof Landar
(Sweden) Paul Karlsson
(Sweden) Jörgen Forslund
(Sweden) Sven-Erik Jonsson
(Sweden) Björn Swartswe	(1)
(Sweden) Rolf Jonsson	(1)
(Sweden) Kurt Nyberg	(1)
(Sweden) Elis Johansson
(Sweden) Bo Hedlund
(Sweden) Allan Arvidsson
(Sweden) Lennart Häll	GK

IK Sirius
(Sweden) Yngve Palmqvist	GK
(Sweden) Göran Andersson
(Sweden) Ulf Fredin
(Sweden) Tore Wikner
(Sweden) Lars Jönsson
(Sweden) Thord Engstrand
(Sweden) Jarl Wahlberg
(Sweden) Gunnar Åberg	(1)
(Sweden) Ove Eidhagen	(1)
(Sweden) Carl-Eric Askelöf
(Sweden) Rolf Larsson
(Sweden) Martin Johansson	GK

== 1963 ==
3 March 1963

Brobergs IF	3–1	Edsbyns IF
G. Sedvall (2); Sjölin	Report	Arvidsson

Stockholm Olympic Stadium, Stockholm
Attendance: 11,214
Referee: Yngve Berglund & Erik Andersson

Brobergs IF
(Sweden) Bo Rönn	GK
(Sweden) Jan-Eric Flink
(Sweden) Göran Enberg
(Sweden) Gunnar Danielsson
(Sweden) Roland Strandlund
(Sweden) Roger Gilljam
(Sweden) Weine Palm
(Sweden) Curt Sedvall
(Sweden) Leif Wasberg
(Sweden) Göran Sedvall	(2)
(Sweden) Sven-Olov Lööf
(Sweden) Kurt Sedvall
(Sweden) Inge Sjölin	(1)
(Sweden) Åke Halvarsson	GK

Edsbyns IF
(Sweden) Gudmund Jernberg	GK
(Sweden) Harley Wennberg
(Sweden) Bernt Frid
(Sweden) Sven-Olof Landar
(Sweden) Paul Karlsson
(Sweden) Jörgen Forslund
(Sweden) Jan Erlandsson
(Sweden) Kurt Nyberg
(Sweden) Rolf Jonsson
(Sweden) Elis Johansson
(Sweden) Allan Arvidsson	(1)
(Sweden) Björn Swartswe
(Sweden) Bo Hedlund
(Sweden) Lennart Häll	GK

== 1964 ==
1 March 1964

Brobergs IF	1–1	Skutskärs IF
Erlander	Report	Malmskär

Stockholm Olympic Stadium, Stockholm
Attendance: 13,387
Referee: Ambjörn Larsson & Åke Bennermo

Brobergs IF
(Sweden) Bo Rönn	GK
(Sweden) Jan-Eric Flink
(Sweden) Göran Enberg
(Sweden) Gunnar Danielsson
(Sweden) Roland Strandlund
(Sweden) Roger Gilljam
(Sweden) Sven-Olof Lööf
(Sweden) Curt Sedvall
(Sweden) Leif Wasberg
(Sweden) Göran Sedvall
(Sweden) Anders Erlander	(1)
(Sweden) Rolf Almstedt
(Sweden) Inge Sjölin
(Sweden) Hans Englund	GK

Skutskärs IF
(Sweden) Bo Nilsson	GK
(Sweden) Leif Andersson
(Sweden) Sven-Olof Thunman
(Sweden) Rolf Pettersson
(Sweden) Inge Cahlman
(Sweden) Sture Strand
(Sweden) Thure Malmskär	(1)
(Sweden) Per-Olof Wallin
(Sweden) Dan Eriksson
(Sweden) Boive Åkerlind
(Sweden) Roland Lindberg
(Sweden) Leif Wanke
(Sweden) Hans Öberg
(Sweden) Håkan Granat	GK

15 March 1964
Replay

Brobergs IF	4–1	Skutskärs IF
C. Sedvall (2); Lööf; G. Sedvall	Report	Lindberg

Studenternas IP, Uppsala
Attendance: 12,379
Referee: Bo Karlsson & David Pettersson

Brobergs IF
(Sweden) Bo Rönn	GK
(Sweden) Jan-Eric Flink
(Sweden) Göran Enberg
(Sweden) Gunnar Danielsson
(Sweden) Roland Strandlund
(Sweden) Roger Gilljam
(Sweden) Sven-Olof Lööf	(1)
(Sweden) Curt Sedvall	(2)
(Sweden) Leif Wasberg
(Sweden) Göran Sedvall	(1)
(Sweden) Anders Erlander
(Sweden) Rolf Almstedt
(Sweden) Inge Sjölin
(Sweden) Hans Englund	GK

Skutskärs IF
(Sweden) Bo Nilsson	GK
(Sweden) Leif Andersson
(Sweden) Sven-Olof Thunman
(Sweden) Rolf Pettersson
(Sweden) Inge Cahlman
(Sweden) Sture Strand
(Sweden) Thure Malmskär
(Sweden) Per-Olof Wallin
(Sweden) Dan Eriksson
(Sweden) Boive Åkerlind
(Sweden) Roland Lindberg	(1)
(Sweden) Leif Wanke
(Sweden) Hans Öberg
(Sweden) Håkan Granat	GK

== 1965 ==
7 March 1965

Örebro SK	5–2	Brobergs IF
Sääw (2); Nordin; Lennartsson; Andersson	Report	Erlander

Stockholm Olympic Stadium, Stockholm
Attendance: 12,546
Referee: Runo Andersson & Rolf Antonsson

Örebro SK
(Sweden) Gunnar Ring	GK
(Sweden) Bo Carlsson
(Sweden) Bengt Carlsson
(Sweden) Gordon Santesson
(Sweden) Alf Strömberg
(Sweden) Hasse Nordin	(1)
(Sweden) Ragnar Eriksson
(Sweden) Olle Sääw	(2)
(Sweden) Orvar Bergmark
(Sweden) Benny Lennartsson	(1)
(Sweden) Bo Andersson	(1)
(Sweden) Gunnar Gurman
(Sweden) Åke Jansson
(Sweden) Sven Karlsson	GK

Brobergs IF
(Sweden) Bo Rönn	GK
(Sweden) Jan-Eric Flink
(Sweden) Göran Enberg
(Sweden) Gunnar Danielsson
(Sweden) Roland Strandlund
(Sweden) Roger Gilljam
(Sweden) Kjell Englund
(Sweden) Curt Sedvall	(1)
(Sweden) Anders Erlander	(1)
(Sweden) Leif Wasberg
(Sweden) Sven Olov Lööf
(Sweden) Kaj Sandin
(Sweden) Gunnar Sjögren
(Sweden) Hans Englund	GK

== 1966 ==
12 March 1966

IK Sirius	5–0	Brobergs IF
Askelöf (2); Persson (2); Pohjanen; Hedin	Report

Studenternas IP, Uppsala
Attendance: 8,682
Referee: Einar Boström & Gert Hedlund

IK Sirius
(Sweden) Nils-Olov Jonsson	GK
(Sweden) Matz Allan Johansson
(Sweden) Ulf Fredin
(Sweden) Thord Engstrand
(Sweden) Christer Johnsson
(Sweden) Malte Eidhagen
(Sweden) Mathias Pohjanen	(1)
(Sweden) Carl-Eric Askelöf	(2)
(Sweden) Leif Eriksson
(Sweden) Håkan Persson	(2)
(Sweden) Rolf Larsson
(Sweden) Jan Hedin	(1)
(Sweden) Bo Ekström	GK

Brobergs IF
(Sweden) Hans Englund	GK
(Sweden) Jan-Eric Flink
(Sweden) Göran Enberg
(Sweden) Gunnar Danielsson
(Sweden) Roland Strandlund
(Sweden) Roger Gilljam
(Sweden) Sven-Olov Lööv
(Sweden) Curt Sedvall
(Sweden) Kjell Englund
(Sweden) Leif Wasberg
(Sweden) Göran Sedvall
(Sweden) Rolf Almstedt
(Sweden) Bo Rönn	GK

== 1967 ==
12 March 1967

Örebro SK	3–1	IF Göta
Nordin; S. Andersson; B. Andersson	Report	Svärd

Söderstadion, Stockholm
Attendance: 10,952
Referee: Curth Nystrand & Ebbe Olsson

Örebro SK
(Sweden) Gunnar Ring
(Sweden) Bo Carlsson
(Sweden) Bengt Carlsson
(Sweden) Örjan Modin
(Sweden) Alf Strömberg
(Sweden) Hasse Nordin	(1)
(Sweden) Ragnar Eriksson
(Sweden) Olle Sääw
(Sweden) Benny Lennartsson
(Sweden) Sören Andersson	(1)
(Sweden) Bo Andersson	(1)
(Sweden) Bo Johansson
(Sweden) Jan-Ivar Ekberg	GK

IF Göta
(Sweden) Sune Eriksson	GK
(Sweden) Lennart Persson
(Sweden) Per-Åke Kjellberg
(Sweden) Roy Johansson
(Sweden) Leif Sveder
(Sweden) Lars Berg
(Sweden) Rune Larsson
(Sweden) Sune Svärd	(1)
(Sweden) Gunnar Björk
(Sweden) Lennart Kästel
(Sweden) Bo Almqvist
(Sweden) Göran Dahl
(Sweden) Bertie Lindblom	GK

== 1968 ==
10 March 1968

IK Sirius	4–1	Örebro SK
Fredin; Pojanen; Alftberg; Josefsson	Report	S. Andersson

Söderstadion, Stockholm
Attendance: 12,877
Referee: Bo Nilsson & Axel Pettersson

IK Sirius
(Sweden) Nils-Olov Jonsson	GK
(Sweden) Matz Allan Johansson
(Sweden) Ulf Fredin	(1)
(Sweden) Lars Svensson
(Sweden) Christer Johnsson
(Sweden) Thord Engstrand
(Sweden) Mathias Pojanen	(1)
(Sweden) Göran Angesten
(Sweden) Hans Alftberg	(1)
(Sweden) Carl-Eric Askelöf
(Sweden) Jan Hedin
(Sweden) Lennart Josefsson	(1)
(Sweden) Jan Tesséus	GK

Örebro SK
(Sweden) Jan-Ivar Ekberg	GK
(Sweden) Bo Carlsson
(Sweden) Bengt Carlsson
(Sweden) Gordon Santesson
(Sweden) Alf Strömberg
(Sweden) Hasse Nordin
(Sweden) Per-Anders Jonsson
(Sweden) Claes-Göran Jansson
(Sweden) Benny Lennartsson
(Sweden) Sören Andersson	(1)
(Sweden) Bo Andersson
(Sweden) Bo Johansson
(Sweden) Gunnar Ring	GK

== 1969 ==
9 March 1969

Katrineholms SK	5–1	Brobergs IF
Cratz (2); Anders Plahn; Österberg; H. Fransson	Report	G. Sedvall

Söderstadion, Stockholm
Attendance: 13,072
Referee: Sune Modigh & Folke Frankenberg

Katrineholms SK
(Sweden) Tommy Axelsson	GK
(Sweden) Håkan Henriksson
(Sweden) Hans Carpman
(Sweden) Roddy Twedberg
(Sweden) Per-Håkan Persson
(Sweden) Gert Persson
(Sweden) Anders Plahn	(1)
(Sweden) Eddy Fransson
(Sweden) Håkan Olsson
(Sweden) Kjell Österberg	(1)
(Sweden) Thomas Cratz	(2)
(Sweden) Henry Fransson	(1)
(Sweden) Per Johansson	GK

Brobergs IF
(Sweden) Göran Engström	GK
(Sweden) Kjell Englund
(Sweden) Björne Nilsson
(Sweden) Erkki Rinne
(Sweden) Håkan Sundin
(Sweden) Roger Gilljam
(Sweden) Göran Sedvall	(1)
(Sweden) Curt Sedvall
(Sweden) Rolf Käck
(Sweden) Leif Wasberg
(Sweden) Rolf Jakobsson
(Sweden) Roland Strandlund
(Sweden) Kjell Pettersson	GK

== 1970 ==
15 March 1970

Katrineholms SK	6–2	Ljusdals BK
Plahn (2); Österberg (2); E. Fransson; Nilsson	Report	Swartswe

Söderstadion, Stockholm
Attendance: 10,834
Referee: Börje Schilström & Elof Lundén

Katrineholms SK
(Sweden) Tommy Axelsson	GK
(Sweden) Håkan Henriksson
(Sweden) Hans Carpman
(Sweden) Roddy Twedberg
(Sweden) Per-Håkan Persson
(Sweden) Gert Persson
(Sweden) Anders Plahn	(2)
(Sweden) Eddy Fransson	(1)
(Sweden) Håkan Olsson
(Sweden) Peter Nilsson	(1)
(Sweden) Kjell Österberg	(2)
(Sweden) Henry Fransson
(Sweden) Per Johansson	GK

Ljusdals BK
(Sweden) Åke Sundell
(Sweden) Roger Andersson
(Sweden) Anders Sellman
(Sweden) Lage Nordén
(Sweden) Örjan Modin
(Sweden) Åke Fors
(Sweden) Björn Swartswe	(1)
(Sweden) Gunnar Palmér
(Sweden) Torbjörn Ek	(1)
(Sweden) Lars Svender
(Sweden) Kent Clemin
(Sweden) Karl-Erik Engblom
(Sweden) Bengt-Olof Forsell	GK

== 1971 ==
28 February 1971

Falu BS	2–0	Sandvikens AIK
Berglund; Norberg	Report

Söderstadion, Stockholm
Attendance: 6,421
Referee: Stig Nilsson & Arne Axelsson

Falu BS
(Sweden) Göran Rogström	GK
(Sweden) Rolf Asplund
(Sweden) Rolf Edberg
(Sweden) Lennart Åkerlund
(Sweden) Björn-Olof Forsberg
(Sweden) Jan Ericsson
(Sweden) Jan-Olov Berglund	(1)
(Sweden) Bernt Ericsson
(Sweden) Egon Adeström
(Sweden) Sören Norberg	(1)
(Sweden) Håkan Wiklund
(Sweden) Göran Björkman
(Sweden) Bo Lindberg	GK

Sandvikens AIK
(Sweden) Ove Lindblom	GK
(Sweden) Bo Forsberg
(Sweden) Leif Jonsson
(Sweden) Matz Allan Johansson
(Sweden) Curt Bergqvist
(Sweden) Rolf Zetterlund
(Sweden) Bengt Johnsson
(Sweden) Lennart Högman
(Sweden) Stig Sjödin
(Sweden) Lars Olsson
(Sweden) Rolf Dahlqvist
(Sweden) Torbjörn Tholén
(Sweden) Göran Engström	GK

== 1972 ==
19 March 1972

Katrineholms SK	2–0	Ljusdals BK
Plahn; H. Fransson	Report

Söderstadion, Stockholm
Attendance: 14,484
Referee: Bo Nilsson & Axel Pettersson

Katrineholms SK
(Sweden) Tommy Axelsson	GK
(Sweden) Christer Andersson
(Sweden) Hans Carpman
(Sweden) Roddy Twedberg
(Sweden) Tommy Lindén
(Sweden) Karl-Åke Larsson
(Sweden) Anders Plahn	(1)
(Sweden) Eddy Fransson
(Sweden) Håkan Olsson
(Sweden) Kjell Österberg
(Sweden) Peter Nilsson
(Sweden) Henry Fransson	(1)
(Sweden) Per Johansson	GK

Ljusdals BK
(Sweden) Lars-Göran Persson	GK
(Sweden) Pär Langer
(Sweden) Anders Sellman
(Sweden) Lage Nordén
(Sweden) Örjan Modin
(Sweden) Åke Fors
(Sweden) Karl-Erik Engblom
(Sweden) Bo Andersson
(Sweden) Torbjörn Ek
(Sweden) Tord Amré
(Sweden) Kent Clemin
(Sweden) Lars Wik
(Sweden) Åke Sundell	GK

== 1973 ==
18 March 1973

Västerås SK	4–1	Örebro SK
Johansson (2); Johnsson; Hedvall	Report	Jansson

Söderstadion, Stockholm
Attendance: 15,033
Referee: Hugo Broman & Berngt Hernvall

Västerås SK
(Sweden) Dan Fredell	GK
(Sweden) Björn-Olof Forsberg
(Sweden) Leif Körberg
(Sweden) Leif Artursson
(Sweden) Stig Sandberg
(Sweden) Lars Liw
(Sweden) Leif Eriksson
(Sweden) Björn Persson
(Sweden) Håkan Andersson
(Sweden) Rauol Johnsson	(1)
(Sweden) Stig Johansson	(2)
(Sweden) Jan Hedvall	(1)
(Sweden) Jörgen Näslund	GK

Örebro SK
(Sweden) Jan-Ivar Ekberg	GK
(Sweden) Leif Eriksson
(Sweden) Lars Olof Eklund
(Sweden) Ola Ljungberg
(Sweden) Gunnar Fredlund
(Sweden) Urban Olsson
(Sweden) Hasse Nordin
(Sweden) Hans Fors
(Sweden) Johnny Petherson
(Sweden) Claes-Göran Jansson	(1)
(Sweden) Sören Andersson
(Sweden) Bo Andersson
(Sweden) Bo Carlsson

== 1974 ==
17 March 1974

Falu BS	3–0	Katrineholms SK
Norberg (2); Wiklund	Report

Söderstadion, Stockholm
Attendance: 15,432
Referee: Bo Karlsson & Ulf Carlsson

Falu BS
(Sweden) Stefan Nykvist	GK
(Sweden) Rolf Asplund
(Sweden) Björn-Olof Forsberg
(Sweden) Lennart Åkerlund
(Sweden) Göran Björkman
(Sweden) Per-Anders Jonsson
(Sweden) Håkan Wiklund	(1)
(Sweden) Bernt Ericsson
(Sweden) Jan Ericsson
(Sweden) Egon Adeström
(Sweden) Sören Norberg	(2)
(Sweden) Jan-Olof Berglund
(Sweden) Håkan Andersson
(Sweden) Bo Lindberg	GK

Katrineholms SK
(Sweden) Tommy Axelsson	GK
(Sweden) Torkel Sundkvist
(Sweden) Hans Carpman
(Sweden) Per-Arne Johansson
(Sweden) Mats Fagerlind
(Sweden) Karl-Åke Larsson
(Sweden) Anders Plahn
(Sweden) Eddy Fransson
(Sweden) Kjell Österberg
(Sweden) Henry Fransson
(Sweden) Bo Larsson
(Sweden) Gert Petersson
(Sweden) Per Johansson	GK

== 1975 ==
16 March 1975

Ljusdals BK	8–4	Villa BK
Johansson (5); Amré (2); Fors	Report	Sandström (2); Isaksson; Skoglund

Söderstadion, Stockholm
Attendance: 17,671
Referee: Arne Axelsson & Sven-Erik Bergstrand

Ljusdals BK
(Sweden) Lars-Göran Persson	GK
(Sweden) Pär Langer
(Sweden) Anders Sellman
(Sweden) Bengt Eriksson
(Sweden) Örjan Modin
(Sweden) Karl-Gunnar Englund
(Sweden) Stefan Johansson	(5)
(Sweden) Karl-Erik Engblom
(Sweden) Tord Amré	(2)
(Sweden) Torbjörn Ek
(Sweden) Kent Clemin
(Sweden) Hans Fors	(1)
(Sweden) Mats Sundell	GK

Villa BK
(Sweden) Göran Johansson	GK
(Sweden) Bo Tagesson
(Sweden) Håkan Lagesson
(Sweden) Kent Sköld
(Sweden) Egon Sköld
(Sweden) Stefan Tärning
(Sweden) Sören Öberg
(Sweden) Olle Isaksson	(1)
(Sweden) Mats Svensson
(Sweden) Tore Skoglund	(1)
(Sweden) Sten-Olof Sandström	(2)
(Sweden) Carl-Gunnar Fasth
(Sweden) Jan Abrahamsson	GK

== 1976 ==
14 March 1976

Brobergs IF	6–2	Falu BS
Sedvall (2); Flodberg (2); Rinne; Hedqvist	Report	Wiklund; Adeström

Söderstadion, Stockholm
Attendance: 13,233
Referee: Ulf Carlsson & Leif Göte Enternäs

Brobergs IF
(Sweden) Lennart Westman	GK
(Sweden) Kjell Englund
(Sweden) Erkki Rinne	(1)
(Sweden) Stefan Karlsson
(Sweden) Leif Wasberg
(Sweden) Dan Dammbro
(Sweden) Göran Sedvall	(2)
(Sweden) Stig Dammbro
(Sweden) Rauol Johnsson
(Sweden) Göran Flodberg	(2)
(Sweden) Pär Hedqvist	(1)
(Sweden) Kjell Sahlin
(Sweden) Jan Bergström	GK

Falu BS
(Sweden) Stefan Nykvist	GK
(Sweden) Tommy Eriksson
(Sweden) Rolf Edberg
(Sweden) Jan Ericsson
(Sweden) Göran Björkman
(Sweden) Per-Anders Jonsson
(Sweden) Hans Hagdahl
(Sweden) Bengt Kalroth
(Sweden) Håkan Wiklund	(1)
(Sweden) Egon Adeström	(1)
(Sweden) Sören Norberg
(Sweden) Lars Hillgren
(Sweden) Bo Lindberg	GK

== 1977 ==
20 March 1977

Brobergs IF	3–1	Sandvikens AIK
Sedvall; S. Dammbro; Persson	Report	Pyykkö

Söderstadion, Stockholm
Attendance: 12,913
Referee: Bo Lundholm & Aren Gustafsson

Brobergs IF
(Sweden) Lennart Westman	GK
(Sweden) Kjell Englund
(Sweden) Erkki Rinne
(Sweden) Stefan Karlsson
(Sweden) Leif Wasberg
(Sweden) Dan Dammbro
(Sweden) Göran Sedvall	(1)
(Sweden) Stig Dammbro	(1)
(Sweden) Bo Persson	(1)
(Sweden) Göran Flodberg
(Sweden) Pär Hedqvist
(Sweden) Rauol Johnsson
(Sweden) Kjell Sahlin
(Sweden) Jan Bergström	GK

Sandvikens AIK
(Sweden) Hans-Erik Grönvall	GK
(Sweden) Bo Forsberg
(Sweden) Stefan Ström
(Sweden) Ulf Sondell
(Sweden) Jan-Erik Flink
(Sweden) Jussi Laine
(Sweden) Mats Pettersson
(Sweden) Lennart Högman
(Sweden) Ralph Eriksson
(Sweden) Lars Olsson
(Sweden) Paavo Pyykkö	(1)
(Sweden) Christer Cronvall
(Sweden) Lars Halvarsson
(Sweden) Leif Inge Johansson	GK

== 1978 ==
19 March 1978

Edsbyns IF	6–4	Västerås SK
Johansson (2); Callberg (2); Lönngren; Håkansson	Report	Boström (2); Pettersson; Ek

Söderstadion, Stockholm
Attendance: 16,621
Referee: Harry Wiklund & Lars Pettersson

Edsbyns IF
(Sweden) Ove Olsson	GK
(Sweden) Stefan Karlsson
(Sweden) Hans-Aren Jansson
(Sweden) Mats Åke Persson
(Sweden) Joe Lönngren	(1)
(Sweden) Lars Liw
(Sweden) Bengt Håkansson	(1)
(Sweden) Ola Johansson	(2)
(Sweden) Christer Andersson
(Sweden) Anders Söderholm
(Sweden) Jan-Eric Callberg	(2)
(Sweden) Lars Jönsson
(Sweden) Ove Frid
(Sweden) Göran Lindberg	GK

Västerås SK
(Sweden) Dan Söderberg	GK
(Sweden) Hans Svensson
(Sweden) Åke Svensson
(Sweden) Dennis Pettersson	(1)
(Sweden) Jan Hedvall
(Sweden) Karl-Axel Jonsson
(Sweden) Stefan Johansson
(Sweden) Conny Kärrman
(Sweden) Sören Boström	(2)
(Sweden) Torbjörn Ek	(1)
(Sweden) Mats Hassel
(Sweden) Stefan Svensson
(Sweden) Håkan Jansson
(Sweden) Mikael Ovesjö	GK

== 1979 ==
18 March 1979

IF Boltic	7–4	Brobergs IF
Ericsson (2); M. Carlsson; Tömmernes; Ramström; Broström; Per Togner	Report	Bergström (2); Hedqvist; Carlsson

Söderstadion, Stockholm
Attendance: 14,128
Referee: Jan-Anders Bergquist & Lars Byström

IF Boltic
(Sweden) Per Engstrand	GK
(Sweden) Mats Carlsson		(1)
(Sweden) Björn Tömmernes		(1)
(Sweden) Bengt Carlsson
(Sweden) Björn-Olof Forsberg
(Sweden) Lars Ångström
(Sweden) Bernt Ericsson		(2)
(Sweden) Bengt Ramström		(1)
(Sweden) Kjell-Göran Broström		(1)
(Sweden) Per Togner		(1)
(Sweden) Göran Olsson
(Sweden) Gunnar Föhr
(Sweden) Lars Clarin
(Sweden) Bengt Johansson	GK

Brobergs IF
(Sweden) Lennart Westman	GK
(Sweden) Kjell Englund
(Sweden) Stefan Karlsson
(Sweden) Lars Bergström	(2)
(Sweden) Leif Wasberg
(Sweden) Dan Dammbro
(Sweden) Göran Sedvall
(Sweden) Stig Dammbro
(Sweden) Pär Hedqvist	(1)
(Sweden) Göran Flodberg
(Sweden) Kjell-Arne Östlund
(Sweden) Bo Persson
(Sweden) Rolf Carlsson	(1)
(Sweden) Anders Söderholm	GK

== 1980 ==
16 March 1980

IF Boltic	5–3	Sandvikens AIK
Broström (3); P. Olsson; Togner	Report	Westlin; Eriksson; Pyykkö

Söderstadion, Stockholm
Attendance: 14,075
Referee: Folke Frankenberg & Åke Svanlund

IF Boltic
(Sweden) Per Engstrand	GK
(Sweden) Mats Carlsson
(Sweden) Björn Tömmernes
(Sweden) Bengt Carlsson
(Sweden) Lars Clarin
(Sweden) Stefan Karlsson
(Sweden) Gunnar Föhr
(Sweden) Peter Olsson	(1)
(Sweden) Göran Olsson
(Sweden) Kenth Hultqvist
(Sweden) Kjell-Göran Broström	(3)
(Sweden) Bengt Ramström
(Sweden) Per Togner	(1)
(Sweden) Bengt Johansson	GK

Sandvikens AIK
(Sweden) Ola Steen	GK
(Sweden) Ove Jansson
(Sweden) Curth Bergqvist
(Sweden) Lars Halvarsson
(Sweden) Håkan Larsson
(Sweden) Stefan Ström
(Sweden) Stefan Westlin	(1)
(Sweden) Ralph Eriksson	(1)
(Sweden) Torbjörn Hägglund
(Sweden) Lars Olsson
(Sweden) Paavo Pyykkö	(1)
(Sweden) Mats Pettersson
(Sweden) Stefan Åsbrink
(Sweden) Per-Olof Pettersson	GK

== 1981 ==
22 March 1981

IF Boltic	4–3	Selånger SK
O. Johansson (2); M. Carlsson; Broström	Report	Aava (2); Sjödin

Söderstadion, Stockholm
Attendance: 14,233
Referee: Karl-Erik Eriksson & Sture Jansson

IF Boltic
(Sweden) Anders Bridholm	GK
(Sweden) Mats Carlsson	(1)
(Sweden) Björn Tömmernes
(Sweden) Bengt Carlsson
(Sweden) Stefan Karlsson
(Sweden) Lars Clarin
(Sweden) Gunnar Föhr
(Sweden) Magnus Berglund
(Sweden) Kenth Hultqvist
(Sweden) Kjell-Göran Broström	(1)
(Sweden) Ola Johansson	(2)
(Sweden) Bengt Ramström
(Sweden) Per Togner
(Sweden) Bengt Johansson	GK

Selånger SK
(Sweden) Thomas Fransson	GK
(Sweden) Tommy Runesson
(Sweden) Keith Sahlin
(Sweden) Östen Sundin
(Sweden) Anders Uhlin
(Sweden) Greger Örjestål
(Sweden) Jan Lindholm
(Sweden) Bernt Lindh
(Sweden) Sture Sandström
(Sweden) Royne Sjödin	(1)
(Sweden) Leif Lundberg
(Sweden) Ingemar Aava	(2)
(Sweden) Lennart Lummi
(Sweden) Anders Nilsson	GK

== 1982 ==
21 March 1982

IF Boltic	3–2	Edsbyns IF
Ramström (3)	Report	Persson; Johansson

Söderstadion, Stockholm
Attendance: 13,888
Referee: Leif Johansson

IF Boltic
(Sweden) Anders Bridholm	GK
(Sweden) Mats Carlsson
(Sweden) Björn Tömmernes
(Sweden) Bengt Carlsson
(Sweden) Stefan Karlsson
(Sweden) Gunnar Föhr
(Sweden) Magnus Berglund
(Sweden) Peter Olsson
(Sweden) Kenth Hultqvist
(Sweden) Kjell-Göran Broström
(Sweden) Ola Johansson
(Sweden) Bengt Ramström	(3)
(Sweden) Per Togner
(Sweden) Torbjörn Sahlin	GK

Edsbyns IF
(Sweden) Ove Olsson	GK
(Sweden) Lars Jönsson
(Sweden) Hans-Arne Jansson
(Sweden) Mats Åke Persson	(1)
(Sweden) Joe Lönngren
(Sweden) Lars Liw
(Sweden) Håkan Karlsson
(Sweden) Anders Söderholm
(Sweden) Jan-Eric Callberg
(Sweden) Birger Byström
(Sweden) Hans Johansson	(1)
(Sweden) Ove Frid
(Sweden) Mats Hammarström
(Sweden) Anders Söderlund	GK

== 1983 ==
20 March 1983

IF Boltic	5–0 (a.e.t.)	Villa BK
M. Carlsson; Karlsson; Olsson; Kruse; Ramström	Report

Söderstadion, Stockholm
Attendance: 18,110
Referee: Germund Nilsson

IF Boltic
(Sweden) Anders Bridholm	GK
(Sweden) Mats Carlsson	(1)
(Sweden) Björn Tömmernes
(Sweden) Bengt Carlsson
(Sweden) Stefan Karlsson	(1)
(Sweden) Peter Olsson	(1)
(Sweden) Magnus Berglund
(Sweden) Gunnar Föhr
(Sweden) Kenth Hultqvist
(Sweden) Kjell Kruse	(1)
(Sweden) Ola Johansson
(Sweden) Bengt Ramström	(1)
(Sweden) Per Togner
(Sweden) Torbjörn Sahlin	GK

Villa BK
(Sweden) Göran Johansson	GK
(Sweden) Jonas Andersson
(Sweden) Sören Öberg
(Sweden) Bo Tagesson
(Sweden) Stefan Tärning
(Sweden) Claes Malmqvist
(Sweden) Mats Svensson
(Sweden) Anders Karlsson
(Sweden) Christer Kjellqvist
(Sweden) Mats Bergqvist
(Sweden) Anders Abrahamsson
(Sweden) Mikael Arvidsson
(Sweden) Olle Isaksson
(Sweden) Jan Abrahamsson	GK

== 1984 ==
18 March 1984

IF Boltic	2–0	Edsbyns IF
Carlsson; Kruse	Report

Söderstadion, Stockholm
Attendance: 14,937
Referee: Arne Funk

IF Boltic
(Sweden) Anders Bridholm	GK
(Sweden) Mats Carlsson	(1)
(Sweden) Björn Tömmernes
(Sweden) Bengt Carlsson
(Sweden) Lars Clarin
(Sweden) Peter Olsson
(Sweden) Gunnar Föhr
(Sweden) Kjell Kruse	(1)
(Sweden) Ola Johansson
(Sweden) Bengt Ramström
(Sweden) Bengt Andersson
(Sweden) Magnus Berglund
(Sweden) Lars Ångström
(Sweden) Torbjörn Sahlin	GK

Edsbyns IF
(Sweden) Peter Hildingsson	GK
(Sweden) Hans-Arne Jansson
(Sweden) Stefan Karlsson
(Sweden) Birger Byström
(Sweden) Jan-Eric Callberg
(Sweden) Joe Lönngren
(Sweden) Håkan Karlsson
(Sweden) Anders Söderholm
(Sweden) Anders Lennartsson
(Sweden) Mats Hammarström
(Sweden) Hans Johansson
(Sweden) Franco Bergman
(Sweden) Mikael Erlandsson
(Sweden) Tim Hellström	GK

== 1985 ==
17 March 1985

IF Boltic	4–3	IFK Motala
Johansson (2); Grundström; Ramström	Report	Andersson (2); Karlsson

Söderstadion, Stockholm
Attendance: 14,629
Referee: Roger Andersson

IF Boltic
(Sweden) Anders Bridholm	GK
(Sweden) Mats Carlsson
(Sweden) Björn Tömmernes
(Sweden) Bengt Carlsson
(Sweden) Lars Clarin
(Sweden) Lars Ångström
(Sweden) Peter Olsson
(Sweden) Bengt Andersson
(Sweden) Johan Grundström	(1)
(Sweden) Kjell Kruse
(Sweden) Ola Johansson	(2)
(Sweden) Bengt Ramström	(1)
(Sweden) Per Togner
(Sweden) Håkan Larsson	GK

IFK Motala
(Sweden) Per-Olof Pettersson	GK
(Sweden) Ulf Spångberg
(Sweden) Peter Bengtsson
(Sweden) Kent Edlund
(Sweden) Stefan Samuelsson
(Sweden) Robert Johnsson
(Sweden) Urban Andersson	(2)
(Sweden) Kjell Edberg
(Sweden) Stefan Lindén
(Sweden) Frank Nordlund
(Sweden) Tony Westling
(Sweden) Östen Eriksson
(Sweden) Thomas Karlsson	(1)
(Sweden) Roland Spångberg	GK

== 1986 ==
16 March 1986

Vetlanda BK	2–1	IF Boltic
P. Johansson; Ljung	Report	Grundström

Söderstadion, Stockholm
Attendance: 11,380
Referee: Gunnar Thunman

Vetlanda BK
(Sweden) Pontus Sundelius	GK
(Sweden) Gert Johansson
(Sweden) Kent Edlund
(Sweden) Stefan Karlsson
(Sweden) Stefan Helm
(Sweden) Anders Freijd
(Sweden) Timo Serenius
(Sweden) Dag Klingborg
(Sweden) Kenth Hultqvist
(Sweden) Patrick Johansson	(1)
(Sweden) Per Lennartsson
(Sweden) Jonny Ljung	(1)
(Sweden) Lars Johansson
(Sweden) Thomas Fransson	GK

IF Boltic
(Sweden) Anders Bridholm	GK
(Sweden) Björn Tömmernes
(Sweden) Kjell Berglund
(Sweden) Peter Olsson
(Sweden) Niclas Johannesson
(Sweden) Lars Ångström
(Sweden) Johan Grundström	(1)
(Sweden) Örjan Gunnarsson
(Sweden) Stefan Ohlsson
(Sweden) Bengt Andersson
(Sweden) Ola Johansson
(Sweden) Bengt Ramström
(Sweden) Kjell Kruse
(Sweden) Håkan Larsson	GK

== 1987 ==
22 March 1987

IFK Motala	3–2	IF Boltic
Rohlén; Arvidsson; Karlsson	Report	O. Johansson; Kruse

Söderstadion, Stockholm
Attendance: 12,823
Referee: Olle Modin

IFK Motala
(Sweden) Per-Olof Pettersson	GK
(Sweden) Joakim Sjögren	GK
(Sweden) Ulf Spångberg
(Sweden) Peter Bengtsson
(Sweden) Kjell Edberg
(Sweden) Stefan Samuelsson
(Sweden) Robert Johnsson
(Sweden) Urban Andersson
(Sweden) Håkan Rohlén	(1)
(Sweden) Frank Nordlund
(Sweden) Tony Westling
(Sweden) Mikael Arvidsson	(1)
(Sweden) Thomas Karlsson	(1)

IF Boltic
(Sweden) Anders Bridholm	GK
(Sweden) Håkan Larsson	GK
(Sweden) Kjell Berglund
(Sweden) Björn Tömmernes
(Sweden) Lars Ångström
(Sweden) Peter Olsson
(Sweden) Jonas Andersson
(Sweden) Örjan Gunnarsson
(Sweden) Stefan Ohlsson
(Sweden) Niclas Johannesson
(Sweden) Leif Lundberg
(Sweden) Ola Johansson	(1)
(Sweden) Bengt Ramström
(Sweden) Kjell Kruse	(1)

== 1988 ==
20 March 1988

IF Boltic	5–2	Vetlanda BK
Johansson; Ramström; Kruse; Togner; Lundberg	Report	Lennartsson (2)

Söderstadion, Stockholm
Attendance: 10,973
Referee: Gunnar Thunman

IF Boltic
(Sweden) Anders Bridholm	GK
(Sweden) Håkan Larsson	GK
(Sweden) Kjell Berglund
(Sweden) Björn Tömmernes
(Sweden) Niclas Johannesson
(Sweden) Peter Olsson
(Sweden) Lars Ångström
(Sweden) Johan Grundström
(Sweden) Örjan Gunnarsson
(Sweden) Ola Johansson	(1)
(Sweden) Bengt Ramström	(1)
(Sweden) Kjell Kruse	(1)
(Sweden) Per Togner	(1)
(Sweden) Leif Lundberg	(1)

Vetlanda BK
(Sweden) Pontus Sundelius	GK
(Sweden) Peter Larsson	GK
(Sweden) Gert Johansson
(Sweden) Stefan Karlsson
(Sweden) Anders Freijd
(Sweden) Kent Edlund
(Sweden) Stefan Helm
(Sweden) Dag Klingborg
(Sweden) Kenth Hultqvist
(Sweden) Per Lennartsson	(2)
(Sweden) Stefan Johansson
(Sweden) Patrick Johansson
(Sweden) Jonny Ljung
(Sweden) Pierre Sunesson

== 1989 ==
19 March 1989

Västerås SK	7–3	Vetlanda BK
H. Johansson (2); S. Jonsson; P. Karlsson; Erlandsson; O. Johansson; Nilsson	Report	Claesson (2); Lennartsson

Söderstadion, Stockholm
Attendance: 12,748
Referee: Håkan Sjösten

Västerås SK
(Sweden) Anders Carlsson	GK
(Sweden) Peder Lönn	GK
(Sweden) Anders Jakobsson
(Sweden) Johan Olsson
(Sweden) Stefan Jonsson		(1)
(Sweden) Christer Karlsson
(Sweden) Göran Rosendahl
(Sweden) Per Karlsson		(1)
(Sweden) Mikael Erlandsson		(1)
(Sweden) Patrik Kaup
(Sweden) Verner Jonsson
(Sweden) Ola Johansson		(1)
(Sweden) Hans Johansson		(2)
(Sweden) Tommy Nilsson		(1)

Vetlanda BK
(Sweden) Pontus Sundelius	GK
(Sweden) Peter Larsson	GK
(Sweden) Gert Johansson
(Sweden) Kent Edlund
(Sweden) Stefan Karlsson
(Sweden) Anders Freijd
(Sweden) Stefan Helm
(Sweden) Per Lennartsson	(1)
(Sweden) Dag Klingborg
(Sweden) Kenth Hultqvist
(Sweden) Jonas Claesson	(2)
(Sweden) Stefan Johansson
(Sweden) Jonny Ljung
(Sweden) Patrick Johansson

== 1990 ==
18 March 1990

Västerås SK	6–3	Sandvikens AIK
H. Johansson (2); S. Jonsson; O. Johansson; P. Karlsson; B. Jonsson	Report	S. Andersson; Åsbrink; Åkerlind

Rocklunda IP, Västerås
Attendance: 14,608
Referee: Leif Johansson

Västerås SK
(Sweden) Anders Carlsson	GK
(Sweden) Göran Rosendahl
(Sweden) Johan Olsson
(Sweden) Christer Karlsson
(Sweden) Roger Carlsson
(Sweden) Stefan Jonsson	(1)
(Sweden) Patrik Kaup
(Sweden) Mikael Erlandsson
(Sweden) Ola Johansson	(1)
(Sweden) Per Karlsson	(1)
(Sweden) Hans Johansson	(2)
(Sweden) Birger Jonsson	(1)
(Sweden) Tommy Nilsson
(Sweden) Peder Lönn	GK

Sandvikens AIK
(Sweden) Per-Ola Grönberg	GK
(Sweden) Anders Jakobsson
(Sweden) Kjell Ohlsson
(Sweden) Ove Jansson
(Sweden) Ola Grönberg
(Sweden) Tomas Johansson
(Sweden) Stefan Andersson	(1)
(Sweden) Tomas Larsson
(Sweden) Håkan Andersson
(Sweden) Stefan Åsbrink	(1)
(Sweden) Stefan Åkerlind	(1)
(Sweden) Thomas Johansson
(Sweden) Håkan Pettersson
(Sweden) Mattias Wox	GK

== 1991 ==
10 March 1991

Vetlanda BK	4–2	Västerås SK
Lennartsson (4)	Report	H. Johansson; Østensen

Studenternas IP, Uppsala
Attendance: 15,885
Referee: Sven Lind

Vetlanda BK
(Sweden) Pontus Sundelius	GK
(Sweden) Jörgen Ivarsson	GK
(Sweden) Kent Edlund
(Sweden) Anders Freijd
(Sweden) Stefan Helm
(Sweden) Stefan Johansson
(Sweden) Gert Johansson
(Sweden) Stefan Gustavsson
(Sweden) Per-Magnus Mårtensson
(Sweden) Patrick Sandell
(Sweden) Jonas Claesson
(Sweden) Thomas Liw
(Sweden) Jonny Ljung
(Sweden) Per Lennartsson	(4)

Västerås SK
(Sweden) Anders Carlsson	GK
(Sweden) Tobias Krämer	GK
(Sweden) Roger Carlsson
(Sweden) Johan Olsson
(Sweden) Stefan Jonsson
(Sweden) Christer Karlsson
(Sweden) Göran Rosendahl
(Sweden) Birger Jonsson
(Sweden) Mikael Erlandsson
(Sweden) Patrik Kaup
(Sweden) Per Karlsson
(Sweden) Ola Johansson
(Sweden) Hans Johansson	(1)
(Norway) Pål Østensen	(1)

== 1992 ==
15 March 1992

Vetlanda BK	4–3	IF Boltic
Claesson (3); Sandell	Report	Engström; U. Andersson; Fredricson

Studenternas IP, Uppsala
Attendance: 12,528
Referee: Magnus Engström

Vetlanda BK
(Sweden) Pontus Sundelius	GK
(Sweden) Jörgen Ivarsson	GK
(Sweden) Kent Edlund
(Sweden) Anders Freijd
(Sweden) Stefan Helm
(Sweden) Stefan Johansson
(Sweden) Gert Johansson
(Sweden) Stefan Gustavsson
(Sweden) Per-Magnus Mårtensson
(Sweden) Patrick Sandell	(1)
(Sweden) Jonas Claesson	(3)
(Sweden) Thomas Liw
(Sweden) Jonny Ljung
(Sweden) Per Lennartsson

IF Boltic
(Sweden) Mikael Forsell	GK
(Sweden) Per Hällström	GK
(Sweden) Kjell Berglund
(Sweden) Björn Tömmernes
(Sweden) Marcus Bergwall
(Sweden) Niclas Johannesson
(Sweden) Kaj Engström	(1)
(Sweden) Urban Andersson	(1)
(Sweden) Örjan Gunnarsson
(Sweden) Tom Jemtrén
(Sweden) Kjell Kruse
(Sweden) Patrik Södergren
(Sweden) Ola Fredricson	(1)
(Sweden) Bengt Andersson

== 1993 ==
21 March 1993

Västerås SK	5–4	IF Boltic
H. Johansson (2); Karlsson; Westman; Fosshaug	Report	Fredricsson (3); Kruse

Studenternas IP, Uppsala
Attendance: 15,185
Referee: Christer Johansson

Västerås SK
(Sweden) Anders Carlsson	GK
(Sweden) Peder Lönn	GK
(Sweden) Mikael Larsson
(Sweden) Johan Olsson
(Sweden) Stefan Jonsson
(Sweden) Göran Rosendahl
(Sweden) Christer Karlsson	(1)
(Sweden) Jonas Holgersson
(Sweden) Mikael Erlandsson
(Sweden) Andreas Westman	(1)
(Sweden) Ola Johansson
(Sweden) Hans Johansson	(2)
(Sweden) Mathias Larsson
(Sweden) Pelle Fosshaug	(1)

IF Boltic
(Sweden) Mikael Forsell	GK
(Sweden) Mikael Borstner	GK
(Sweden) Kjell Berglund
(Sweden) Björn Tömmernes
(Sweden) Kaj Engström
(Sweden) Fredrik Rinaldo
(Sweden) Marcus Bergwall
(Sweden) Urban Andersson
(Sweden) Örjan Gunnarsson
(Sweden) Tom Jemtrén
(Sweden) Niclas Johannesson
(Sweden) Ola Fredricsson	(3)
(Sweden) Patrik Södergren
(Sweden) Kjell Kruse	(1)

== 1994 ==
20 March 1994

Västerås SK	5–2	Vetlanda BK
Fosshaug (2); Rosendahl; M. Carlsson; Liw	Report	Niskanen; Lennartsson

Studenternas IP, Uppsala
Attendance: 15,412
Referee: Lars-Göran Sjöling

Västerås SK
(Sweden) Anders Carlsson	GK
(Sweden) Fredrik Lindqvist	GK
(Sweden) Stefan Jonsson
(Sweden) Johan Olsson
(Sweden) Mikael Larsson
(Sweden) Göran Rosendahl	(1)
(Sweden) Jonas Holgersson
(Sweden) Pelle Fosshaug	(2)
(Sweden) Andreas Westman
(Sweden) Mikael Erlandsson
(Sweden) Michael Carlsson	(1)
(Sweden) Hans Johansson
(Sweden) Thomas Liw	(1)
(Sweden) Christer Karlsson

Vetlanda BK
(Sweden) Pontus Sundelius	GK
(Sweden) Peder Zachrisson	GK
(Sweden) Kent Edlund
(Sweden) Magnus Jonsson
(Sweden) Gert Johansson
(Sweden) Stefan Johansson
(Sweden) Stefan Helm
(Sweden) Patrick Sandell
(Sweden) Stefan Gustavsson
(Sweden) Jonas Claesson
(Sweden) Stefan Sjöblad
(Finland) Samuli Niskanen	(1)
(Sweden) Per Lennartsson	(1)
(Sweden) Rolf Hedberg

== 1995 ==
19 March 1995

IF Boltic	2–1	Vetlanda BK
Hanssen (2)	Report	Claesson

Studenternas IP, Uppsala
Attendance: 12,088
Referee: Kent Lisell

IF Boltic
(Sweden) Mikael Forsell	GK
(Sweden) Mikael Borstner	GK
(Sweden) Kjell Berglund
(Sweden) Jan Olsson
(Sweden) Kaj Engström
(Sweden) Marcus Bergwall
(Sweden) Tom Jemtrén
(Sweden) Niclas Johanneson
(Sweden) Urban Andersson
(Sweden) Rickard Timmerklev
(Norway) Pål Hanssen	(2)
(Sweden) Patrik Södergren
(Sweden) Tommie Eriksson
(Sweden) Ola Fredricson

Vetlanda BK
(Sweden) Pontus Sundelius	GK
(Sweden) Peder Zachrisson	GK
(Sweden) Kent Edlund
(Sweden) Gert Johansson
(Sweden) Magnus Jonsson
(Sweden) Stefan Helm
(Sweden) Stefan Johansson
(Sweden) Patrick Sandell
(Sweden) Stefan Gustavsson
(Sweden) Rolf Hedberg
(Sweden) Jonas Claesson	(1)
(Sweden) Stefan Sjöblad
(Sweden) Håkan Adolfsson
(Sweden) Per Lennartsson

== 1996 ==
17 March 1996

Västerås SK	7–3	Sandvikens AIK
Westman (2); Johansson (2); Liw; Fosshaug; M. Carlsson	Report	Åström (2); Åkerlind

Studenternas IP, Uppsala
Attendance: 17,211
Referee: Christer Johansson

Västerås SK
(Sweden) Anders Carlsson	GK
(Sweden) Fredrik Lindqvist	GK
(Sweden) Stefan Jonsson
(Sweden) Mikael Larsson
(Sweden) Johan Olsson
(Sweden) Göran Rosendahl
(Sweden) Lars Gustafsson
(Sweden) Ted Andersson
(Sweden) Jonas Holgersson
(Sweden) Andreas Westman	(2)
(Sweden) Thomas Liw	(1)
(Sweden) Hans Johansson	(2)
(Sweden) Pelle Fosshaug	(1)
(Sweden) Michael Carlsson	(1)

Sandvikens AIK
(Sweden) Daniel Kjörling	GK
(Sweden) Anders Thorsell	GK
(Sweden) Anders Jakobsson
(Sweden) Patrik Mattson
(Sweden) Daniel Eriksson
(Sweden) Niklas Spångberg
(Sweden) Anders Roth
(Sweden) Stefan Andersson
(Sweden) Stefan Åkerlind	(1)
(Sweden) Tomas Larsson
(Sweden) Håkan Pettersson
(Sweden) Magnus Muhrén
(Sweden) Hans Åström	(2)
(Sweden) Patrik Södergren

== 1997 ==
23 March 1997

Sandvikens AIK	5–4	Västerås SK
Andersson (3); Åström; Muhrén	Report	H. Johansson (4)

Studenternas IP, Uppsala
Attendance: 17,488
Referee: Tommy Gustafsson

Sandvikens AIK
(Sweden) Daniel Kjöling	GK
(Sweden) Anders Thorsell	GK
(Sweden) Patrik Södergren
(Sweden) Patrik Mattson
(Sweden) Niklas Spångberg
(Sweden) Anders Jakobsson
(Sweden) Anders Roth
(Sweden) Tomas Larsson
(Sweden) Stefan Åkerlind
(Sweden) Stefan Andersson	(3)
(Sweden) Daniel Eriksson
(Sweden) Jonas Gustafsson
(Sweden) Hans Åström	(1)
(Sweden) Magnus Muhrén	(1)

Västerås SK
(Sweden) Anders Carlsson	GK
(Finland) Petri Isonen	GK
(Sweden) Göran Rosendahl
(Sweden) Johan Olsson
(Sweden) Anders Hedlund
(Sweden) Jonas Johansson
(Sweden) Lars Gustafsson
(Sweden) Pelle Fosshaug
(Sweden) Ted Andersson
(Sweden) Stefan Jonsson
(Sweden) Pierre Roos
(Sweden) Hans Johansson	(4)
(Sweden) Michael Carlsson
(Sweden) Thomas Liw

== 1998 ==
22 March 1998

Västerås SK	6–4	Sandvikens AIK
Fredricson (2); M. Carlsson (2); Fosshaug; Andersson; Niskanen	Report	Gustafsson (2); Muhrén; Johansson

Studenternas IP, Uppsala
Attendance: 18,027
Referee: Håkan Sjösten

Västerås SK
(Sweden) Anders Carlsson	GK
(Finland) Petri Isonen	GK
(Sweden) Lars Gustafsson
(Sweden) Göran Boström
(Sweden) Anders Hedlund
(Sweden) Johan Olsson
(Sweden) Stefan Jonsson
(Sweden) Pelle Fosshaug	(1)
(Sweden) Ted Andersson
(Sweden) Ola Fredricson	(2)
(Sweden) Michael Carlsson	(2)
(Finland) Samuli Niskanen	(1)
(Sweden) Pierre Roos
(Sweden) Mattias Larsson

Sandvikens AIK
(Sweden) Daniel Kjörling	GK
(Sweden) Anders Thorsell	GK
(Sweden) Patrik Mattson
(Sweden) Anders Rooth
(Sweden) Niklas Spångberg
(Sweden) Daniel Eriksson
(Sweden) Patrik Södergren
(Sweden) Stefan Andersson
(Sweden) Magnus Muhrén	(1)
(Sweden) Tomas Larsson
(Sweden) Anders Östling
(Sweden) Jonas Gustafsson	(2)
(Sweden) Magnus Johansson	(1)
(Russia) Rinat Shamsutov

== 1999 ==
21 March 1999

Västerås SK	3–2	Falu BS
Andersson (2); Olsson	Report	Spångberg; Obukhov

Studenternas IP, Uppsala
Attendance: 19,122
Referee: Peter Andrén

Västerås SK
(Sweden) Andreas Bergwall	GK
(Sweden) Henrik Steen	GK
(Sweden) Johan Olsson	(1)
(Sweden) Anders Hedlund
(Sweden) Göran Boström
(Sweden) Lars Gustafsson
(Sweden) Mattias Larsson
(Sweden) Ted Andersson	(2)
(Sweden) Pierre Roos
(Sweden) Pelle Fosshaug
(Sweden) Ola Fredricson
(Sweden) Thomas Liw
(Sweden) Michael Carlsson
(Finland) Samuli Niskanen

Falu BS
(Sweden) Mikael Eklund	GK
(Sweden) Michael Hedström	GK
(Sweden) Kjell Ohlsson
(Sweden) Mattias Andersson
(Sweden) Jörgen Momkvist
(Sweden) Anders Johansson
(Sweden) Joakim Folkesson
(Sweden) Kenneth Spångberg	(1)
(Russia) Valeriy Gratchev
(Sweden) Örjan Elfström
(Sweden) Ulf Jonsson
(Russia) Sergey Obukhov	(1)
(Sweden) Patrik Anderbro
(Sweden) Tomas Jansson

== See also ==
- List of Swedish bandy championship finals (1907–1949)
- List of Swedish bandy championship finals (2000–)
