= List of Sweden international bandy players =

The following list of Sweden international bandy players covers all bandy players with 50 or more official caps for the Sweden national bandy team. The players are listed here sorted first by the total number of caps.

== Key ==
	Still active for the national team.
Caps	Appearances
Pos	Positions
GK	Goalkeeper
DF	Defender
MF	Midfielder
FW	Forward

== List of players ==
As of 31 July 2017.

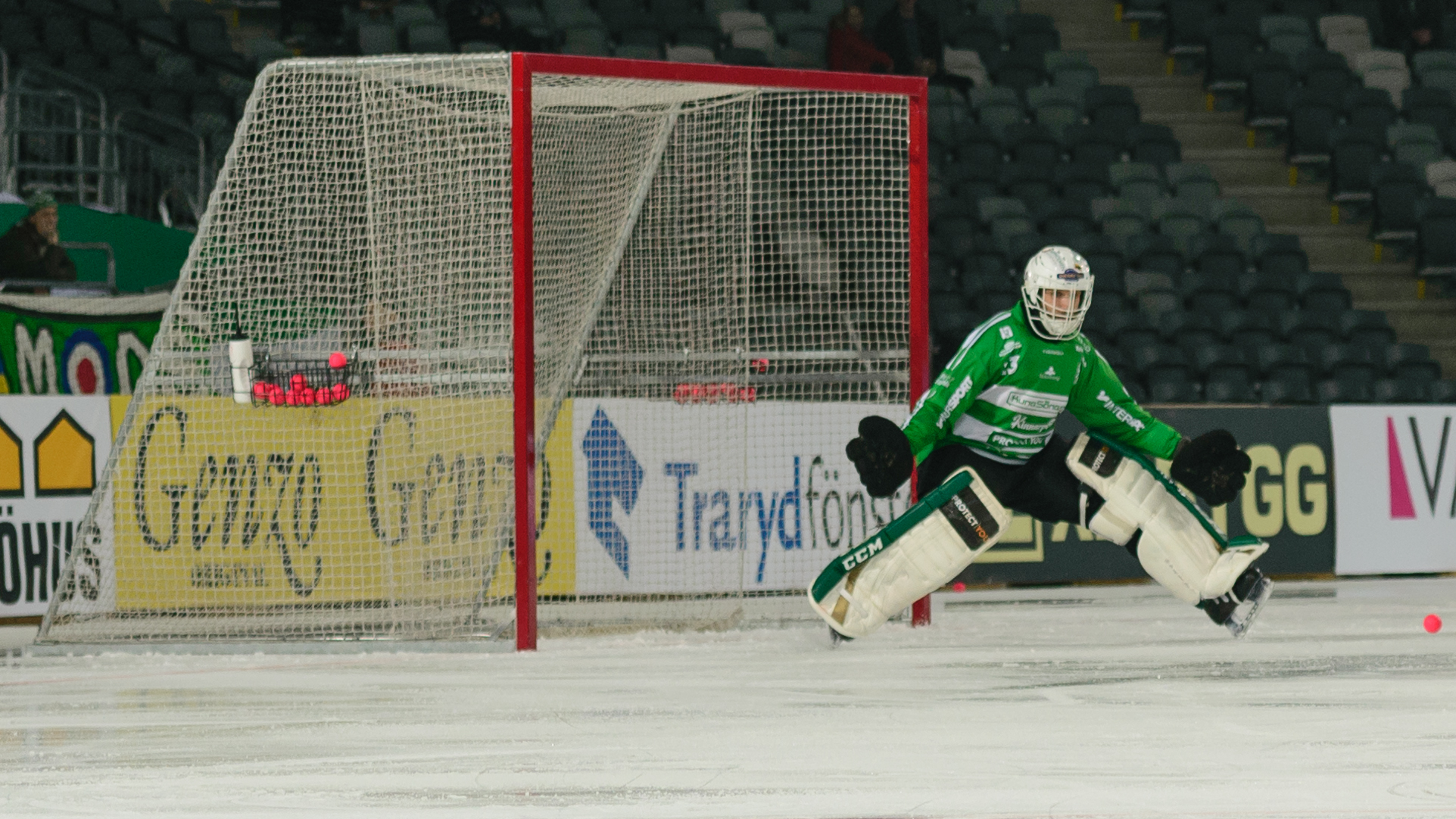
Andreas Bergwall has made the most appearances for the national team, with 195.

Player	Pos	Caps	Goals	First	Last	Club career
Andreas Bergwall	GK	195				IFK Kungälv, Västerås, Vetlanda, Hammarby, Dynamo Kazan, Tillberga
Marcus Bergwall		140				Boltic, Hammarby, BolticGöta, Vetlanda
Andreas Westh		143				Sandviken, Bollnäs
Pelle Fosshaug		129				Falun, IFK Vänersborg, Västerås, Sandviken
Hans Johansson		127				Edsbyn, Västerås
Anders Svensson		118				Edsbyn, Dynamo Kazan
Ola Johansson		117				Edsbyn, Boltic, Västerås
Per Hellmyrs		115				Edsbyn, Raketa, Bollnäs, Dynamo Moscow
Sören Boström		114				Västanfors, Västerås
Stefan Erixon		114				IFK Motala, Hammarby, Zorky
Mikael Forsell		110				Villa Lidköping, Boltic
Bernt Ericsson		109				Falun, Boltic
Stefan Jonsson		107				Ljusdal, Västerås, Hammarby
Bengt Ramström		106				Örebro, Boltic
Göran Rosendahl		102				Västerås, Hammarby
Torbjörn Ek		102				Ljusdal, Västerås, IFK Kungälv
Stefan Karlsson		101				Broberg, Boltic, Vetlanda
Anders Östling		98				Sandviken, Västerås, Dynamo Kazan
Joe Lönngren		96				Edsbyn
Håkan Karlsson		96				Bollnäs, Edsbyn
Patrik Nilsson		96				Sandviken, Hammarby, Dynamo Kazan, Zorky
Daniel Mossberg		94				Sandviken, Zorky, Dynamo Moscow
Hans Andersson		93				Edsbyn, Dynamo Kazan
Daniel Berlin		93				Sandviken, Dynamo Moscow
Mikael Arvidsson		92				Villa Lidköping, IFK Motala
Christer Kjellqvist		89				Villa Lidköping, Sirius
Johan Esplund		89				Elless, Otterbäcken, Villa Lidköping, Dynamo Kazan, Zorky
Olov Englund		87				Hammarby, Kalix
Jonas Holgersson		87				Hammarby
Daniel Andersson		84				Villa Lidköping, Edsbyn, Zorky
Magnus Muhrén		82				Sandviken
Hans Åström		82				Edsbyn, Sandviken, Bollnäs
Jonas Claesson		82				Vetlanda, Hammarby
Patrik Södergren		81				Sandviken
Ola Fredricson		79				Boltic, Västerås
Patrick Sandell		79				Vetlanda, IFK Motala, Hammarby
Håkan Ohlsson		78				Katrineholm, IFK Vänersborg, Värmbol
Kjell Österberg		77				Katrineholm
Tommy Axelsson		74				Katrineholm
Lars-Ove Sjödin		74				Västerås, Örebro
Daniel Välitalo		70				Edsbyn, Dynamo Kazan
Håkan Sundin		70				IFK Stockholm, Edsbyn, Broberg, Sirius
Michael Carlsson		70				Västerås
Jan-Erik Flink		70				Broberg, Bollnäs, Sandviken
Kjell Berglund		69				Boltic
Patrick Johansson		64				Vetlanda, Selånger
Lars Ångström		64				Lesjöfors, Boltic, Ale/Surte
Henrik Hagberg		64				Sandviken
Jonas Edling		64				Edsbyn
Christoffer Edlund		64				Vetlanda, Sandviken
Linus Pettersson		63				IFK Motala, Sandviken, Zorky
Per-Olof Petersson		61				IFK Motala
Anders Bridholm		61				Boltic
Daniel Eriksson		60				Sandviken
Stefan Åkerlind		59				Sandviken
David Karlsson		59				Vetlanda, Hammarby, Villa Lidköping
Per Togner		58				Boltic
Göran Sedwall		57				Broberg, Mjölby
Erik Säfström		57				Örebro, Sandviken, SKA-Neftyanik
Thomas Fransson		55				Hälleforsnäs, Selånger, Vetlanda
Bengt Eriksson		52				Ljusdal, Bollnäs
