= Allsvenskan and Elitserien (bandy) =

Former bandy league competition system in Sweden

Allsvenskan
- Sport: Bandy
- Founded: 1931
- Ceased: 2007
- No. of teams: 16
- Country: Sweden
- Last champion(s): Edsbyns IF

The combination Allsvenskan (Swedish: Allsvenskan i bandy) and Elitserien (Swedish: Elitserien i bandy) was earlier the highest level of bandy in Sweden contested annually between Swedish bandy clubs. The Allsvenskan was split into two regional divisions: the Allsvenskan Norra (north) and the Allsvenskan Södra (south), in which the teams played during the autumn. After the Christmas holiday the Allsvenskan was split into Elitserien (top four teams in each group) and Superallsvenskan (last four teams in each group). The season ended in March with a final on Studenternas IP like the Super Bowl.

Starting with the 2007–08 season, the league structure was remade. Allsvenskan became the name of the second highest level with the national Elitserien as the highest level.

== Season structure ==
Each division contained eight sides. Each team played the other teams in their division twice, one at home the other away. The teams finishing in the top four of each division qualified for the "Elitserien". Teams finishing 5th to 8th in their groups went into the Superallsvenskan.

== Teams ==
The teams for the last season (2006–07) were the following:

=== Allsvenskan Norra ===
- Bollnäs GIF, Bollnäs
- Broberg/Söderhamn Bandy, Söderhamn
- Edsbyns IF, Edsbyn
- Falu BS, Falun
- Ljusdals BK, Ljusdal
- Sandvikens AIK, Sandviken
- IK Sirius, Uppsala
- Tillberga IK, Tillberga

=== Allsvenskan Södra ===
- BS BolticGöta, Karlstad
- Hammarby IF, Stockholm
- IFK Motala, Motala
- Vetlanda BK, Vetlanda
- Villa Lidköping BK, Lidköping
- IFK Vänersborg, Vänersborg
- Västerås SK, Västerås
- Örebro SK, Örebro

== Teams by number of seasons ==
Seasons	Club
74	Västerås SK
67	Sandvikens AIK
62	Edsbyns IF, Örebro SK
56	Nässjö IF
55	Bollnäs GIF, Broberg/Söderhamn Bandy
53	Katrineholms SK
47	IF Karlstad-Göta, IK Sirius
46	Ljusdals BK
45	Falu BS
41	Skutskärs IF
40	Villa Lidköping BK
39	Hammarby IF
32	Västanfors IF
31	BS BolticGöta, Slottsbrons IF, Vetlanda BK
28	IFK Motala
26	IFK Kungälv, Selånger SK
23	IFK Vänersborg
22	AIK, Tranås BoIS
21	Hälleforsnäs IF, Lesjöfors IF
19	Ale/Surte SK
17	Köpings IS, IFK Rättvik
16	Forsbacka IK
15	IK Huge
13	IFK Uppsala
11	IK Heros, Kalix/Nyborg BK, IF Vesta
9	IFK Askersund, Reymersholms IK
8	Djurgårdens IF
7	IFK Stockholm, SK Tirfing, Värmbols GoIF
5	BK Derby
4	Gripen/Trollhättan BK, Skoghalls IF
3	Filipstads IF, IK Göta, Karlsborgs BK, IK Sleipner, Sundbybergs IK, IF Verdandi
2	Eskilstuna BS, IFK Eskilstuna, Färjestads BK, Ludvika FFI, IK Mode, Sandslåns SK, IFK Strängnäs, IK Viljan, Västerås BK, Waggeryds IK
1	Alfta GIF, BK Borgia, Falu BK, Finspångs AIK, BK Forward, Grycksbo IF, Hallstahammars SK, Härnösands AIK, Linköpings AIK, Mälarhöjdens IK, Mjölby AI, IFK Norrköping, Nynäshamns IF, IF Rune, Råsunda IS, Söderköpings IS, Tillberga IK Bandy, Tranås AIF, IFK Växjö, IFK Åmål, Åtvidabergs BK

== Top goalscorers ==
Topscorers in the league excluding play-offs

Season	Player	Team	Goals
1930–31	(Sweden) Gunnar Hyttse	Västerås SK	12
1931–32	(Sweden) Gunnar Hyttse	Västerås SK	12
1932–33	(Sweden) Gunnar Hyttse	Västerås SK	8
1933–34	(Sweden) Ejnar Ask	IFK Uppsala	18
1934–35	(Sweden) Gunnar Hyttse	Västerås SK	14
1935–36	(Sweden) Hjalmar Klarqvist	Slottsbrons IF	11
1936–37	(Sweden) Henry Muhrén	Skutskärs IF	5
1937–38	(Sweden) Harald Törnqvist	Slottsborns IF	9
1940–39	(Sweden) Harald Jonsson	Nässjö IF	6
1939–40	(Sweden) Sixten Jansson	IF Vesta	13
1940–41	(Sweden) Jörgen Wasberg	Örebro SK	14
1941–42	(Sweden) Jörgen Wasberg	Örebro SK	16
1942–43	(Sweden) Ture Siljeholm	IK Huge	13
1943–44	(Sweden) Pontus Widén	Västerås SK	17
1944–45	(Sweden) Harald Törnqvist	Slottsbrons IF	14
1945–46	(Sweden) Stig Johansson	Sandvikens AIK	14
1946–47	(Sweden) Tage Magnusson	Örebro SK	18
1947–48	(Sweden) Tage Magnusson	Örebro SK	12
1948–49	(Sweden) Ejnar Ask	Sandvikens AIK	12
1949–50	(Sweden) Pontus Widén	Västerås SK	14
1950–51	(Sweden) Pontus Widén	Västerås SK	10
1950–51	(Sweden) Tage Magnusson	Örebro SK	10
1951–52	(Sweden) Nils Bergström	Nässjö IF	12
1952–53	(Sweden) Henry Muhrén	Skutskärs IF	10
1952–53	(Sweden) Tore Olsson	IF Göta	10
1953–54	(Sweden) Sven-Erik Broberg	Västanfors IF	12
1954–55	(Sweden) Arnold Bergström	Nässjö IF	16
1954–55	(Sweden) Nils Bergström	Nässjö IF	16
1955–56	(Sweden) Lars Lööw	Västanfors IF	12
1956–57	(Sweden) Sven-Erik Broberg	IF Göta	13
1957–58	(Sweden) Nils Bergström	Nässjö IF	13
1958–59	(Sweden) Sven-Erik Broberg	Västerås SK	18
1959–60	(Sweden) Sven-Erik Broberg	Västerås SK	15
1960–61	(Sweden) Ove Eidhagen	IK Sirius	11
1961–62	(Sweden) Rolf Jonsson	Edsbyns IF	14
1962–63	(Sweden) Åke Jansson	Katrineholms SK	14
1962–63	(Sweden) Göran Sedvall	Brobergs IF	14
1963–64	(Sweden) Claes-Håkan Asklund	Västerås SK	22
1964–65	(Sweden) Bernt Ericsson	Falu BS	25
1965–66	(Sweden) Bernt Ericsson	Falu BS	35
1966–67	(Sweden) Bernt Ericsson	Falu BS	31
1967–68	(Sweden) Leif Wasberg	Brobergs IF	26
1968–69	(Sweden) Lars Lööw	Västanfors IF	24
1969–70	(Sweden) Kent Pettersson	Hälleforsnäs IF	24
1970–71	(Sweden) Henry Fransson	Katrineholms SK	25
1971–72	(Sweden) Lars Olsson	Sandvikens AIK	41
1972–73	(Sweden) Bernt Ericsson	Falu BS	41
1973–74	(Sweden) Bernt Ericsson	Falu BS	33
1974–75	(Sweden) Sten-Olof Sandström	Villa BK	27
1975–76	(Sweden) Lars Olsson	Sandvikens AIK	34
1976–77	(Sweden) Lars Olsson	Sandvikens AIK	38
1977–78	(Sweden) Lars Olsson	Sandvikens AIK	39
1978–79	(Sweden) Pär Hedqvist	Brobergs IF	43
1979–80	(Sweden) Lars Olsson	Sandvikens AIK	43
1980–81	(Sweden) Mikael Arvidsson	Villa BK	37
1981–82	(Sweden) Mikael Arvidsson	Villa BK	40
1982–83	(Sweden) Mikael Arvidsson	Villa BK	57
1983–84	(Sweden) Tord Amré	Ljusdals BK	35
1984–85	(Sweden) Ingemar Aava	Selånger SK	39
1984–85	(Sweden) Pär Hedqvist	Brobergs IF	39
1985–86	(Sweden) Kjell Kruse	IF Boltic	48
1986–87	(Sweden) Patrick Johansson	Vetlanda BK	37
1987–88	(Sweden) Hans Johansson	Västerås SK	38
1988–89	(Sweden) Hans Johansson	Västerås SK	38
1989–90	(Sweden) Kjell Kruse	IF Boltic	35
1990–91	(Sweden) Hans Johansson	Västerås SK	38
1991–92	(Sweden) Jonas Claesson	Vetlanda BK	53
1992–93	(Sweden) Jonas Claesson	Vetlanda BK	39
1993–94	(Sweden) Hans Johansson	Västerås SK	40
1994–95	(Sweden) Jonas Claesson	Vetlanda BK	56
1995–96	(Sweden) Jonas Claesson	Vetlanda BK	58
1996–97	(Sweden) Jonas Claesson	Vetlanda BK	44
1996–97	(Sweden) Hans Åström	Sandvikens AIK	44
1997–98	(Sweden) Jonas Claesson	Hammarby IF	52
1998–99	(Sweden) Jonas Claesson	Hammarby IF	62
1999–2000	(Sweden) Magnus Muhrén	Sandvikens AIK	55
2000–01	(Russia) Sergey Obukhov	Falu BS	63
2001–02	(Russia) Sergey Obukhov	Falu BS	58
2002–03	(Sweden) Patrik Rönnqvist	Edsbyns IF	50
2003–04	(Russia) Sergey Obukhov	Falu BS	47
2004–05	(Sweden) David Karlsson	Hammarby IF	56
2005–06	(Sweden) David Karlsson	Hammarby IF	40
2006–07	(Sweden) Patrik Nilsson	Sandvikens AIK	70

== Past seasons ==
- Allsvenskan 2005/06
- Allsvenskan 2006/07
