= 1993 Bandy World Championship squads =

Below are the squads for the 1993 Bandy World Championship final tournament in Norway.

== Group A ==
=== Sweden ===
Coach: Rolf Käck

No.	Pos.	Player	Date of birth (age)	Caps	Club
	GK	Mikael Forsell			(Sweden) Boltic
	GK	Pontus Sundelius			(Sweden) Vetlanda
		Roger Karlsson			(Sweden) IFK Motala
		Kjell Berglund			(Sweden) Boltic
		Joe Lönngren			(Sweden) Edsbyn
		Stefan Jonsson			(Sweden) Västerås
		Göran Rosendahl			(Sweden) Västerås
		Hans Åström			(Sweden) Edsbyn
		Patrick Sandell			(Sweden) Vetlanda
		Niclas Johannesson			(Sweden) Boltic
		Stefan Åkerlind			(Sweden) Sandviken
		Anders Karlsson			(Sweden) Villa Lidköping
		Jonas Claesson			(Sweden) Vetlanda
		Hans Johansson			(Sweden) Västerås
		Pelle Fosshaug			(Sweden) Västerås
		Ola Fredricsson			(Sweden) Boltic
		Patrick Johansson			(Sweden) Selånger
