= 1997 Bandy World Championship squads =

Below are the squads for the 1997 Bandy World Championship final tournament in Sweden.

== Group A ==
=== Sweden ===
Coach: Stefan Karlsson

No.	Pos.	Player	Date of birth (age)	Caps	Club
	GK	Mikael Forsell			(Sweden) Boltic
	GK	Andreas Bergwall			(Sweden) IFK Kungälv
		Kjell Berglund			(Sweden) Boltic
		Gert Johanson			(Sweden) Vetlanda
		Marcus Bergwall			(Sweden) Boltic
		Göran Rosendahl			(Sweden) Västerås
		Magnus Olsson			(Sweden) Edsbyn
		Patrick Sandell			(Sweden) IFK Motala
		Niklas Spångberg,			(Sweden) Sandviken
		Jonas Claesson			(Sweden) Hammarby
		Jonas Holgersson			(Sweden) Hammarby
		Pelle Fosshaug			(Sweden) Västerås
		Ola Fredricson			(Sweden) Boltic
		Hans Åström			(Sweden) Sandviken
		Stefan Jonsson			(Sweden) Västerås
		Magnus Muhrén			(Sweden) Sandviken
