= 1995 Bandy World Championship squads =

Below are the squads for the 1995 Bandy World Championship final tournament in the United States.

== Group A ==
=== Sweden ===
Coach: Leif Klingborg

No.	Pos.	Player	Date of birth (age)	Caps	Club
	GK	Mikael Forsell			(Sweden) Boltic
	GK	Pontus Sundelius			(Sweden) Vetlanda
		Kjell Berglund			(Sweden) Boltic
		Gert Johansson			(Sweden) Vetlanda
		Christer Karlsson			(Sweden) Västerås
		Stefan Jonsson			(Sweden) Västerås
		Göran Rosendahl			(Sweden) Västerås
		Hans Åström			(Sweden) Sandviken
		Patrick Sandell			(Sweden) Vetlanda
		Stefan Åkerlind			(Sweden) Sandviken
		Magnus Olsson			(Sweden) Edsbyn
		Jonas Claesson			(Sweden) Vetlanda
		Hans Johansson			(Sweden) Västerås
		Pelle Fosshaug			(Sweden) Västerås
		Ola Fredricson			(Sweden) Boltic
		Patrik Södergren			(Sweden) Boltic
