= 2007–08 Elitserien (bandy) =

2007–08 Elitserien season
- League: (Sweden) Elitserien
- Sport: Bandy
- Duration: October 2007 – March 2008
- Number of teams: 14

Regular season
- League Champions: Sandvikens AIK
- Runners-up: Edsbyns IF
- Relegated to Allsvenskan: Tillberga IK, Falu BS

Playoffs
- Finals champions: Edsbyns IF
- Runners-up: Sandvikens AIK

Elitserien seasons
- ← Allsvenskan and Elitserien 2006–2007 2008–2009 →

Elitserien for bandy in 2007–08 was the first season of the "new" Elitserien, replacing the former Allsvenskan and Elitserien.

== League table ==
Pos	Team	Pld	W	D	L	GF	GA	GD	Pts	
1	Sandvikens AIK	26	22	0	4	226	116	+110	44	Advance to Knock-out stage
2	Edsbyns IF	26	19	4	3	212	114	+98	42	Advance to Knock-out stage
3	Västerås SK	26	17	4	5	160	95	+65	38	Advance to Knock-out stage
4	Hammarby IF	26	17	1	8	162	128	+34	35	Advance to Knock-out stage
5	Villa Lidköping BK	26	14	0	12	153	151	+2	28	Advance to Knock-out stage
6	Vetlanda BK	26	11	3	12	118	128	−10	25	Advance to Knock-out stage
7	IFK Motala	26	10	5	11	133	145	−12	25	Advance to Knock-out stage
8	Broberg/Söderhamn	26	10	4	12	129	127	+2	24	Advance to Knock-out stage
9	Bollnäs GIF	26	9	6	11	112	134	−22	24	
10	IFK Vänersborg	26	8	4	14	84	115	−31	20	
11	Gripen Trollhättan BK	26	8	2	16	91	150	−59	18	Qualification to Relegation playoffs
12	IK Sirius	26	7	3	16	89	126	−37	17	Qualification to Relegation playoffs
13	Tillberga IK	26	5	4	17	116	174	−58	14	Relegation to the Allsvenskan
14	Falu BS	26	3	4	19	90	172	−82	10	Relegation to the Allsvenskan

Updated to match(es) played on completed. Source:

=== Knock-out stage ===
A best-of-three playoff were used in the quarter-finals and best-of-five in the semi-finals. The crucial final for the Swedish Championship was played at Studenternas IP in Uppsala on 15 March 2008.

Quarter-finals
Sandvikens AIK	8	11
IFK Motala	6	3
Hammarby IF	4	5	6
Villa Lidköping BK	6	3	5
Västerås SK	3	7
Broberg/Söderhamn Bandy	0	4
Edsbyns IF	3	4
Vetlanda BK	2	3

Semi-finals
Sandvikens AIK	7	2	14	6
Hammarby IF	2	3	2	4
Västerås SK	1	6	2	2	3
Edsbyns IF	0	4	7	3	4

Final
15 March – Uppsala
Sandvikens AIK	6
Edsbyns IF	11

==== Final ====
15 March 2008
15:00 UTC+1

Edsbyns IF	11–6 (a.e.t.)	Sandvikens AIK
Hedqvist (3); Liw (2); Hammarström (2); Edling (2); Olsson; Törnberg	Report	Nilsson (3); Hagberg; Andersson; Mohlén

Attendance: 19,513

== Season statistics ==
=== Top scorers ===
As of end of season.

Rank	Player	Club	Goals
1	(Sweden) Patrik Nilsson	Sandvikens AIK	94
2	(Sweden) Joakim Hedqvist	Edsbyns IF	59
3	(Sweden) Jonas Edling	Edsbyns IF	48
4	(Sweden) Lars Karlsson	Hammarby IF	42
5	(Sweden) Magnus Muhrén	Sandvikens AIK	40
6	(Sweden) Michael Carlsson	Västerås SK	38
7	(Sweden) Jesper Bryngelsson	Villa Lidköping BK	36
8	(Sweden) Mattias Rydberg	Tillberga IK	35
8	(Sweden) Christoffer Edlund	Vetlanda BK	35
10	(Sweden) Daniel Andersson	Villa Lidköping BK	34
