= Arne Argus =

Swedish sports manager

president of the International Bandy Federation
- In office 1967–1971

chairman of Swedish Bandy Association
- In office 1964–1970

Personal details
- Born: 21 December 1924 Bodafors, Sweden
- Died: 8 November 2008 (aged 83)
- Occupation: journalist; author; sports executive

Arne Argus (born 21 December 1924 in Bodafors, Sweden – 8 November 2008) was a Swedish newspaper journalist and sports executive. He started his 50-year newspaper career as a sports journalist in the area of Nässjö and Eksjö and ended it with 14 years as the CEO for newspaper Östgöta Correspondenten in Linköping.

In the years 1964 through 1970 he was the chairman of Swedish Bandy Association, and from 1967 to 1971 the president of the International Bandy Federation. He also served for 20 years on the board of Swedish Sports Confederation and eleven years on the board of Sveriges Television, the Swedish public service broadcasting television company.

Argus has also written books, mainly about bandy, for instance 100 Bandyfinaler (1998), Bandy i 100 år (2002) and Bandy-Jubel (2005). He also produced books for jubilees, like Nässjö IF 50 år (1949), Nässjö IF 100 år (1999), Smålands Idrottsförbund 50 år (1952) and Smålands Idrottsförbund 100 år (2001).

Preceded by Gösta Ellhammar	Chairman of Swedish Bandy Association; 1964–1970	Succeeded by Pontus Widén
Preceded by Allan Ljungqvist (Finland)	President of International Bandy Federation; 1967–1971	Succeeded by Grigory Granaturov (Soviet Union)
