= Adolfsson =

Adolfsson is a surname or an Icelandic patronymic. Notable people with the surname include:

- Håkan Adolfsson (born 1971), Swedish bandy player
- Mattias Adolfsson (born 1965), Swedish graphic artist and illustrator
- Ólafur Adolfsson, Icelandic politician
- Steinar Dagur Adolfsson (born 1970), Icelandic footballer
- Sune Adolfsson (born 1950), Swedish biathlete
