= Sävsjö BK =

Bandy club in Sävsjö, Sweden

- Full name: Sävsjö bandyklubb
- Sport: bandy
- Founded: 1971
- Based in: Sävsjö, Sweden

Sävsjö BK was a bandy club in Sävsjö, Sweden, established in 1971. Jonas Claesson played for the team, debuting in Division 2 as a 13 years old. before switching to Vetlanda BK at age 14.

The women's team has played two seasons in the Swedish top division., 1972/1973 and 1973/1974.
