= Adolphson =

Adolphson is a surname originating in Scandinavia. Notable people with the surname include:

- Edvin Adolphson (1893–1979), Swedish actor and director
- Kristina Adolphson (born 1937), Swedish film actor, daughter of Edvin
- Olle Adolphson (1934–2004), Swedish writer, singer and songwriter, son of Edvin
- Peter H. Adolphson (born 1957), American politician

== See also ==
- Adolphson & Falk, a Swedish synthpop band
- Håkan Adolfsson (born 1971), Swedish bandy player
