= Johanneshovs IP =

Sports ground in Stockholm, Sweden

Coordinates: 59°17′45″N 18°4′55″E

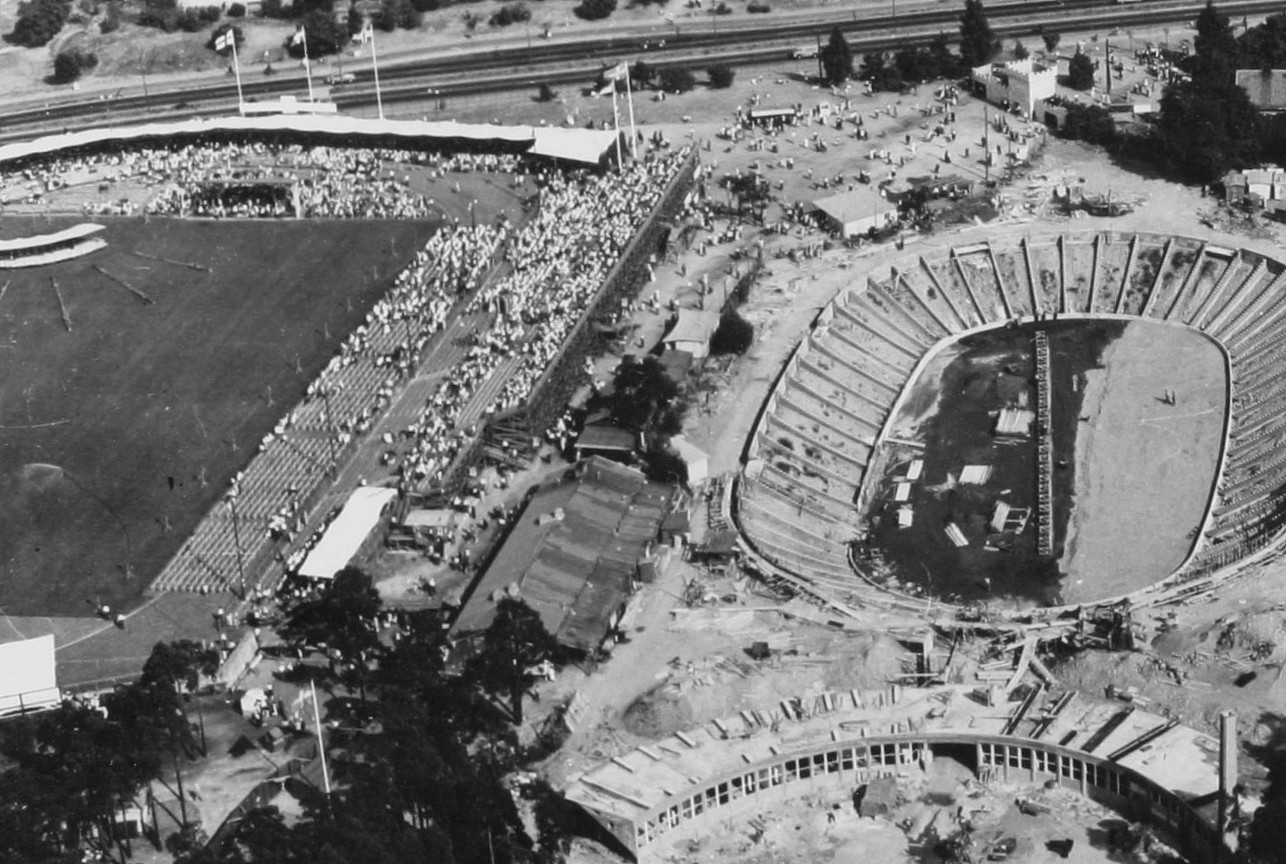
- Johanneshovs IP (on the left) around 1955
- Interactive map of Johanneshovs IP
- Full name: Johanneshovs Idrottsplats
- Location: Johanneshov, Stockholm, Sweden
- Capacity: 12,000

Construction
- Built: 1918–1928
- Opened: 1928
- Expanded: 1944
- Closed: 1964

Johanneshovs IP was a football stadium in Stockholm, Sweden and the former home stadium for the football team Hammarby IF before the construction of Söderstadion. It was founded in 1928 and was demolished in 1967 when Söderstadion was built on the existing site of the stadium.

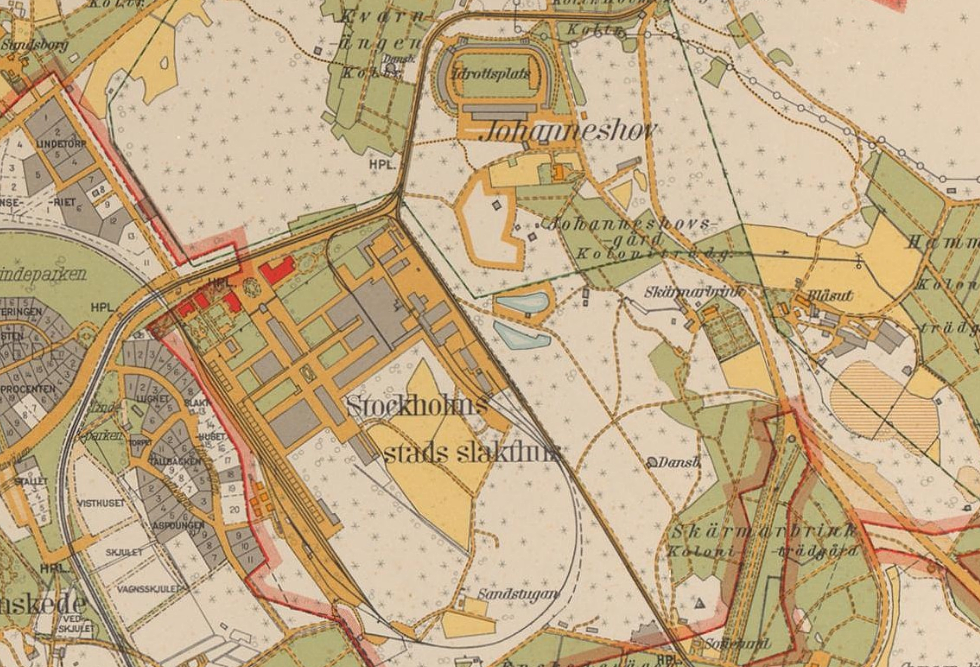
Johanneshovs IP on a map from the 1920s (in the upper part, "Idrottsplats").
