= Ted Andersson =

Swedish bandy player

Personal information
- Born: 20 December 1972 (age 53)
- Playing position: Midfielder

Club information
- Current team: Västerås SK
- Number: 13

Youth career
- Västanfors IF

Senior career*
| Years | Team | Apps^{†} | (Gls)^{†} |
| 1993–1994 | Västanfors IF | | |
| 1994–2012 | Västerås SK | | |
| 1997–1998 | Aros BK | | |

National team
| 1998–2001 | Sweden | | |
- * Senior club appearances and goals counted for the domestic league only. † Appearances (Goals).

Ted Andersson (born 20 December 1972) is a former Swedish bandy player who most recently played for Västerås SK as a midfielder. Ted was a youth product of Västanfors IF and was spotted during his first season by Västerås SK where he has stayed since. Ted has played for the Swedish national bandy team.
