= Rolf Hedberg =

Swedish bandy player (born 1973)

Rolf Hedberg (born February 11, 1973) is a Swedish bandy player who currently plays for Vetlanda BK as a defender.

Rolf has played for Vetlanda BK since 1992 after transferring from Nässjö IF where he spent one season. He has now made over 300 appearances for the club and is their longest serving player along with Håkan Adolfsson who also begun playing for the club in the 1992-93 season.
