= Mattias Rydberg =

Swedish bandy player

Mattias Rydberg (born December 3, 1985) is a Swedish bandy player who currently plays for Västerås SK as a forward. Mattias was a youth product of Västerås SK and made his first team debut in the 2003/04 season. Mattias played for the Sweden U19 squad during the 2003/04 season.

Mattias has played for two clubs, they are:-

Västerås SK (2003-2004)
Västanfors IF (2004-2005)
Västerås SK (2005-)
