= Söderstadion =

Former sports ground in Stockholm, Sweden

Coordinates: 59°17′45.5″N 18°4′55″E

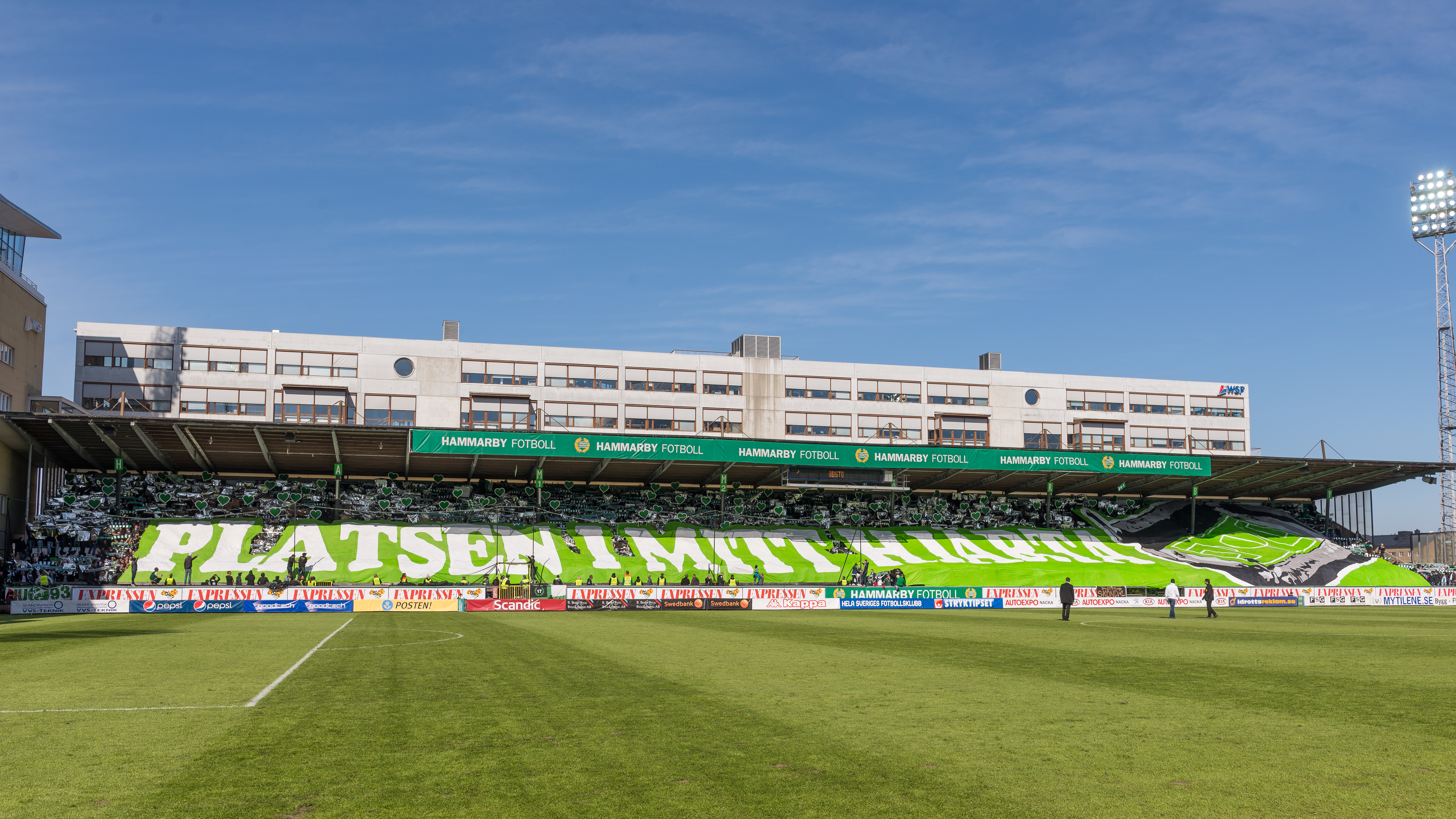
- A Söderstadion tifo in 2013
- Interactive map of Söderstadion
- Full name: Söderstadion
- Capacity: 12,800
- Field size: 105 x 65 m

Construction
- Built: ?–1966
- Opened: 20 November 1966
- Closed: 23 June 2013
- Demolished: 2015

Tenant
- Hammarby IF

Söderstadion (lit. 'the Southern Stadium') was a football and bandy stadium in Stockholm, Sweden. It was opened in 1966 and closed in 2013, being replaced by nearby Tele2 Arena.

Söderstadion had a capacity of 12,800 depending on usage. A record attendance of 22,000 was set on 31 October 1982, when Hammarby IF faced IFK Göteborg.

There had already existed stadiums at the site, the earliest opened in 1918 under the name Johanneshovs Idrottsplats. After the stadium was closed, the site will now be used for new apartment buildings.

Bandy was played at Söderstadion wintertime until 1989 and the Swedish championship final was traditionally played there. The Bandy World Championship 1987 final was played at the arena (2nd half of the video). The last bandy match at the stadium was the Swedish final of 1989.

The home team Hammarby, the 2010 and 2013 Swedish champions, now plays at Zinkensdamm.

The arena has also been used for ice hockey.

== Replacement ==
Before the Stockholm municipal elections of 2006, the centre-right parties of Stockholm promised that a new stadium would be built if the municipal elections were won. On 28 June 2007 plans for a new stadium were officially announced. The last football game at Söderstadion was played on 23 June 2013 when Hammarby IF played against Ängelholms FF in the 13th round of Superettan. The game ended 1–1 with Hammarby securing a late draw when Kennedy Bakircioglu scored the last goal at Söderstadion.

== Communication ==
The stadium was located just next to the Ericsson Globe. It was most easily reached from the Stockholm Metro stations Gullmarsplan or Globen.

== Trivia ==
The stadium is mentioned by its old name in the movie My Life as a Dog (1985), where the main character tells the audience of a motorcycle accident that occurred during a motorcycle show performed there.

== See also ==
- Hammarby IF
- 3Arena

== Notes ==
Preceded by Valle Hovin; Oslo, Norway	Bandy World Championship; Final Venue; 1987	Succeeded by Olympic Stadium; Moscow, Russia
