= Anders Roth =

Finnish footballer (born 1967)

Personal information
- Date of birth: 17 March 1967 (age 59)
- Place of birth: Hanko, Finland
- Height: 1.83 m (6 ft 0 in)
- Position: Midfielder

Senior career*
Years	Team	Apps	(Gls)
1983–1984	Hangö IK		
1985	ABK-48		
1986	Hangö IK	22	(9)
1987–1991	Örgryte IS	70	(11)
1992	Hangö IK	12	(4)
1993–1996	MyPa	78	(7)
1997–1998	FinnPa	20	(0)
1998–2001	Hangö IK	56	(15)

International career
1989–1990	Finland	7	(0)
- * Club domestic league appearances and goals

Anders Roth (born 17 March 1967) is a retired Finnish football midfielder.
