= Andreas Bergwall =

Swedish bandy player

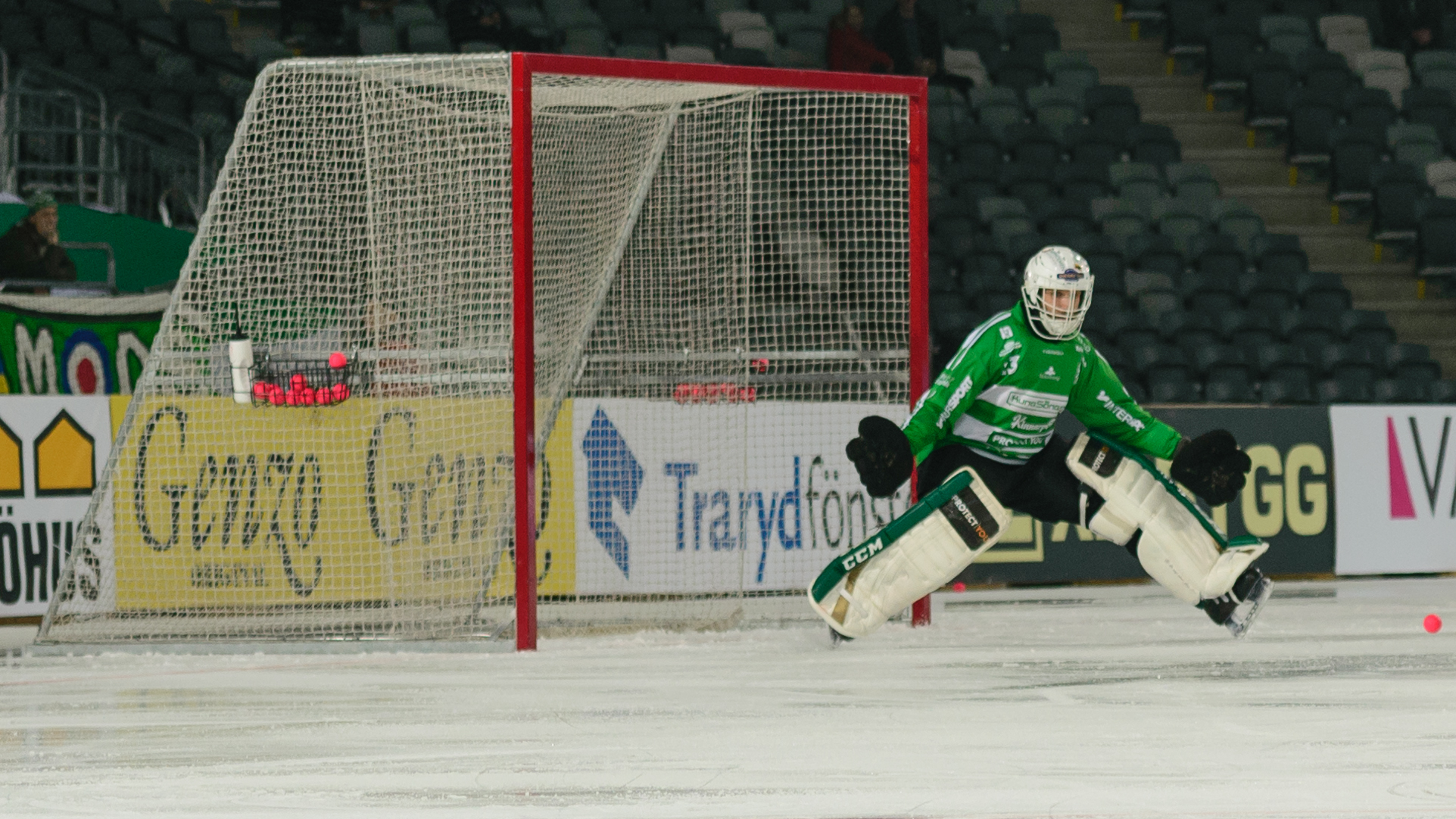
- Anders Bergwall in 2015.

Personal information
- Date of birth: 10 June 1974 (age 51)
- Playing position: Goalkeeper

Club information
- Current team: Västerås SK
- Number: 13

Youth career
- Lesjöfors IF

Senior career*
| Years | Team | Apps^{†} | (Gls)^{†} |
- Lesjöfors IF
| 1996–1998 | IFK Kungälv | | |
| 1998–2004 | Västerås SK | | |
| 2004–2005 | Vetlanda BK | | |
| 2005–2007 | Hammarby IF | | |
| 2007–2010 | Dynamo Kazan (Note: 2007–2008 as Raketa.) | | |
| 2010–2011 | Tillberga IK | | |
| 2011–2012 | Dynamo Kazan | | |
| 2012–2013 | Hammarby IF | | |
| 2013– | Västerås SK | | |

National team
| 1996– | Sweden | 174 | |
Medal record
Men's bandy
Representing Sweden
World Championships
| Gold medal – first place | 1997 Sweden | Team |
| Gold medal – first place | 2003 Arkhangelsk | Team |
| Gold medal – first place | 2005 Kazan | Team |
| Gold medal – first place | 2009 Västerås | Team |
| Gold medal – first place | 2010 Moscow | Team |
| Gold medal – first place | 2012 Almaty | Team |
| Gold medal – first place | 2017 Sandviken | Team |
| Silver medal – second place | 2007 Kemerovo | Team |
| Silver medal – second place | 2014 Irkutsk | Team |
- * Senior club appearances and goals counted for the domestic league only. † Appearances (Goals).

Andreas Bergwall (born 10 June 1974) is a Swedish bandy player who plays in Västerås SK as a goalkeeper. Bergwall is the younger brother of former bandy player Marcus Bergwall. Bergwall has played for Sweden's national team and has played in several Bandy World Championship tournaments.

Bergwall has made 174 appearances for Sweden.

== Honours ==
=== Country ===
Sweden

- Bandy World Championship: 1997, 2003, 2005, 2009, 2010, 2012, 2017
