= Torbjörn Ek =

Swedish bandy and football player (1949–2010)

Personal information
- National team: Sweden
- Born: 25 June 1949; Ljusdal, Sweden
- Died: 18 August 2010 (aged 61); Ljusdal, Sweden

Sport
- Country: Sweden
- Sport: Bandy, association football

Torbjörn Ek (25 June 1949 – 18 August 2010) was a Swedish bandy and football player and manager. He was considered one of the country's top bandy players during the 1970s and early 1980s.

Ek was capped 102 times for the Swedish national bandy team, scoring 89 goals, and was a member of silver-medal winning teams at the Bandy World Cup on 6 occasions. He was a member of the team which won the junior bandy world cup in 1967. In 1975 Ek's team Ljusdals BK won the Swedish bandy league. He managed the Swedish national bandy team for 1 match, in 1993.

Ek also had an elite football career, playing in 62 Allsvenskan matches, for AIK (1971–1973) and GIF Sundsvall (1975), winning a silver medal as a member of the AIK team which finished as runner-up in the 1972 season.
