= Håkan Adolfsson =

Swedish bandy player

Personal information
- Born: 10 September 1971 (age 54)
- Playing position: Forward

Senior career*
Years	Team	Apps^{†}	(Gls)^{†}
1992–1999	Vetlanda BK		
1999–2003	Tranås BoIS		
2003–2009	Vetlanda BK		
- * Senior club appearances and goals counted for the domestic league only. † Appearances (Goals).

Håkan Adolfsson (born 10 September 1971) is a Swedish former bandy player who most recently Vetlanda BK as a forward.

Håkan has only played for Vetlanda BK where he began playing professionally in 1992. He has now made over 200 appearances for the club and is its longest serving player along with Rolf Hedberg who also began with the club in the 1992–93 season.
