= BS BolticGöta =

- City: Karlstad, Sweden
- League: Allsvenskan
- Founded: 11 May 2000; 25 years ago
- Home arena: Tingvalla Isstadion

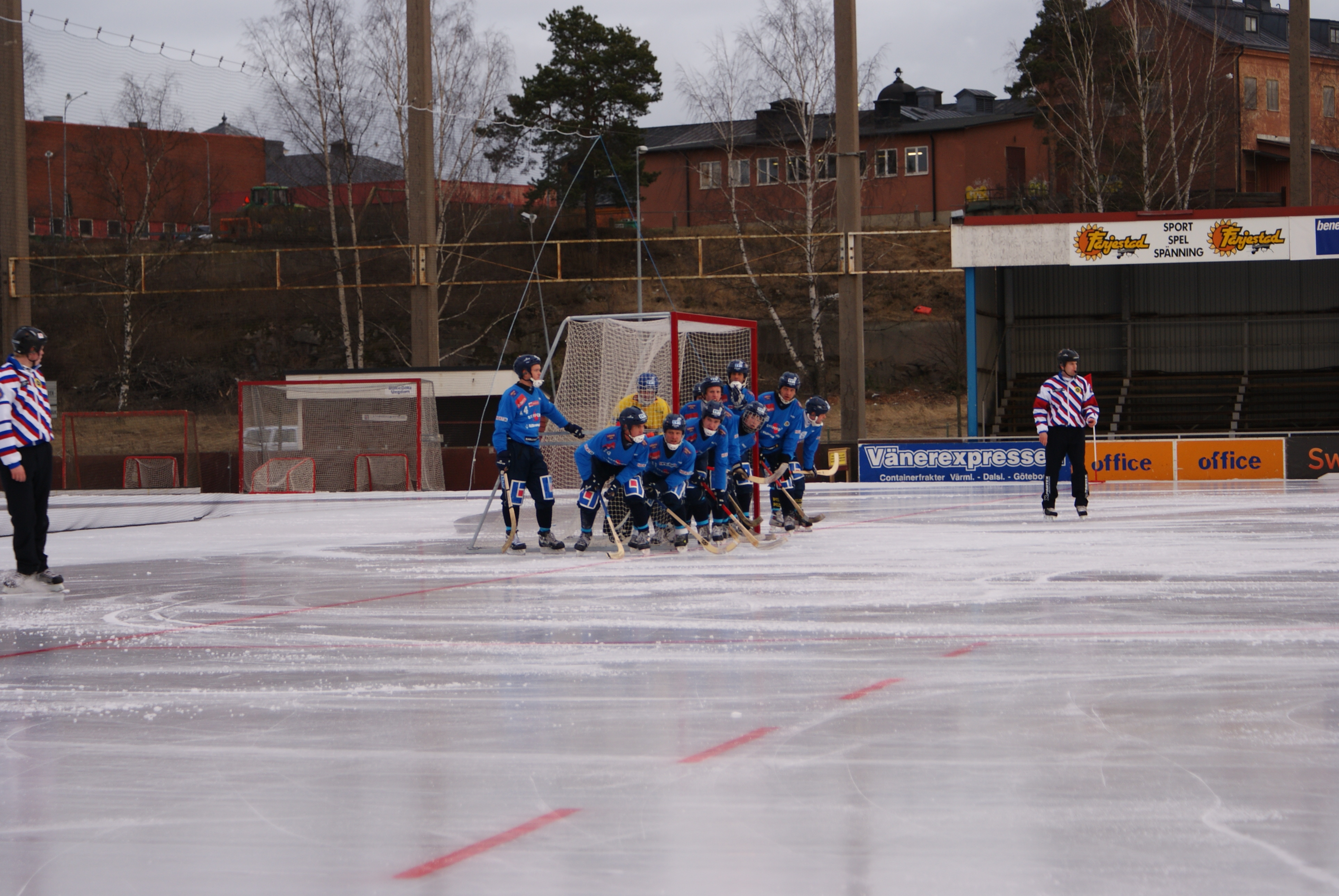
BolticGöta preparing to defend against a corner stroke.

BS BolticGöta, or for short "BG", was a bandy club in Karlstad, Sweden.

The two major bandy clubs in Karlstad, IF Boltic and IF Göta, was merged in the year 2000 and founded Föreningen Bandysällskapet BolticGöta Karlstad, in a shorter form called BS BolticGöta.

The club was relegated from the Swedish top division during the 2006–2007 season.

Since the winter 2008-09, the first team played IF Boltic again, even if the formal name stayed the same.

In 2014, the general meeting of Boltic decided to take back the club's old name IF Boltic. BS BolticGöta was thus history.
