= Jonas Claesson =

Swedish bandy player

Personal information
- Full name: Jonas Alf Magnus Claesson
- Born: 1 December 1970 (age 55) Sävsjö, Sweden
- Playing position: Forward

Youth career
- Sävsjö BK

Senior career*
Years	Team	Apps^{†}	(Gls)^{†}
1986–1996	Vetlanda BK	237	(411)
1996–2002	Hammarby IF	178	(362)

National team
1991–1999	Sweden	82	(144)

Teams managed
- 2008–2010: Vetlanda BK
- 2010–2011: Kuzbass
- 2013–2015: Sweden
- 2015–2016: Vetlanda BK
- 2022–: Hammarby IF
Medal record
Men's bandy
Representing Sweden
World Championships
Gold medal – first place	1993 Hamar	Team
Gold medal – first place	1995 Roseville	Team
Gold medal – first place	1997 Västerås	Team
Silver medal – second place	1991 Helsinki	Team
Bronze medal – third place	1999 Arkhangelsk	Team
- * Senior club appearances and goals counted for the domestic league only. † Appearances (Goals).

Jonas Claesson (born 1 December 1970) is a former Swedish bandy player and coach. One of the most renowned Swedish players, he played as a forward for Vetlanda BK and Hammarby IF at club level. He won three World Championships with Sweden and is a member of the Swedish Bandy Hall of Fame.

== Club career ==
=== Vetlanda BK ===
Born and raised in Sävsjö, Claesson started to play bandy with local club Sävsjö BK as a youngster before joining Vetlanda BK. On 14 January 1987, at age 17, Claesson made his debut in the top tier Allsvenskan for the club, scoring a brace in a 13–4 win against Örebro SK.

He reached his first national final with the club in 1989, but lost 7–3 to Västerås SK. In 1991, Claesson won the Swedish Championship with Vetlanda BK, in a 4–2 win against Västerås SK. It was followed up by a consecutive title in 1992, defeating IF Boltic 4–3 in the final, in a season where Claesson became the top scorer in Allsvenskan for the first time in his career. Claesson was awarded the prize as Swedish Bandy Player of the Year in both 1991 and 1992, Vetlanda BK's gold winning seasons.

Claesson followed up his success by being the top scorer in Allsvenskan in 1993, 1995 and 1996. Remaining among the top Swedish bandy clubs, Vetlanda BK reached the national final in both 1994 and 1995, but lost to Västerås SK and IF Boltic. He left in 1996 and reclaimed the award as Swedish Bandy Player of the Year in his final season with Vetlanda BK. In total, Claesson scored 411 goals in 237 regular season and playoff games for the club.

=== Hammarby IF ===
In 1996, Claesson joined Hammarby IF, that had been promoted to Allsvenskan two years earlier.

He remained as the league's top scorer in 1997, 1998 and 1999, helping establishing the club as a serious contender for the Swedish Championship. Claesson reached the national final with Hammarby IF in both 2000 and 2001, but lost to Sandvikens AIK and Västerås SK.

Claesson was voted as Swedish Bandy Player of the Year in both 1999 and 2000, meaning that he is the only player that has been awarded the prize five times in his career, together with Bernt Ericsson from Falu BS who was active in the 1970s.

In 2002, at age 31, Claesson retired from bandy due to a back injury. He scored a total of 362 goals for Hammarby IF in 178 matches, bringing his total scoring tally in Allsvenskan to 773 goals in 441 games. The record was not broken until 2016, when David Karlsson surpassed Claesson as the all-time top scorer in the Swedish first division.

After his playing career had ended, Claesson was inducted into the Swedish Bandy Hall of Fame.

== International career ==
He played his first World Championship for Sweden in 1991, where his country lost 3–4 to the Soviet Union in the final, with Claesson being the top scorer of the tournament.

Claesson won his first gold medal in the 1993 World Championship, beating Russia 8–0 in the final. The success was followed up in 1995, through a 6–4 win against the same opponent, and in 1997, through a 10–5 win. Claesson remained as the top scorer in all three gold winning tournaments.

He played his final World Championship in 1999, where Sweden finished in third place, winning the bronze medal. In total, Claesson won 82 caps for his country and scored 144 goals.

Claesson is a recipient of the Swedish Bandy Association's honorary award Stora Grabbars Märke.

== Coaching career ==
After his playing career ended, Claesson worked as a pundit for Radiosporten, the sport section of Sveriges Radio.

In 2008, Claesson was appointed as the head coach of Vetlanda BK in Elitserien, where he stayed for two seasons. When his contract expired in 2010, he joined Russian club Kuzbass on a one-year deal, becoming only the second Swedish coach ever to work in the country.

Claesson became the new head coach of the Swedish national team in 2013, replacing Franco Bergman. He led his country to two finals in the 2014 and 2015 World Championship's, but lost to Russia in both tournaments.

In 2015, Claesson returned to his former club Vetlanda BK, but left the club at the end of 2016 due to poor results.

On 25 April 2022, Claesson became the new head coach of his former club Hammarby IF, signing a two-year deal.

== Honours ==
=== Club ===
Vetlanda BK

- Swedish Championship: 1991, 1992
- World Cup: 1988, 1993

Hammarby IF

- World Cup: 1999, 2001

=== International ===
Sweden

- World Championship: 1993, 1995, 1997

=== Individual ===
- Swedish Bandy Player of the Year: 1991, 1992, 1996, 1999, 2000
- Allsvenskan top scorer: 1992, 1993, 1995, 1996, 1997, 1998, 1999
- World Championship top scorer: 1991, 1993, 1995, 1997
