= Swedish Bandy Association =

Bandy governing body in Sweden

- Svenska bandyförbundet
- Logo of the federation
- Predecessor: Swedish Football Association
- Formation: 5 April 1925
- Type: Governing body
- Purpose: Governing body for the sport of bandy in Sweden
- Location: Stockholm, Sweden
- Region served: Sweden
- Members: Federation of International Bandy (1955)
- President: Gisela Stockhaus
- Website: svenskbandy.se

The Swedish Bandy Association (Swedish: Svenska Bandyförbundet) is the governing body of the winter team sport of bandy in Sweden. It organizes the bandy leagues, Elitserien and Allsvenskan for men and Damallsvenskan for women, and the men's and women's national teams. It was established in Stockholm on 5 April 1925, and is based in Stockholm, after moving from Katrineholm. It is a founding member of FIB, Federation of International Bandy.

Bandy was introduced in Sweden in 1895 by all-round athlete Clarence von Rosen. He picked the game up during a visit to bandy's home country Great Britain. He started the first bandy club in Sweden, Stockholm Hockeyklubb. First in 1905 bandy was organized within Swedish Ballgame Association and a year later within Swedish Football Association. At a meeting April 5, 1925, the Swedish Bandy Association was formed, representing 49 clubs.

Since 1931, the Swedish Bandy Association regularly arranges national leagues in Sweden. Swedish bandy champions is a title held by the winners of the final. The final is played in March.

The Swedish Bandy Association consisted of 23 district associations until 2013, when these were replaced by 6 larger districts for a more efficient administration. The six districts are Mellansverige (Central Sweden), Nord (North), Stockholm, Småland, Sydväst (South West), and Västergötland.

Swedish Bandy Association was one of the founding members of the Federation of International Bandy in 1955.

On 11 June 2022, Gisela Stockhaus was appointed the first female chairperson of the Swedish Bandy Association.

== Chairpersons ==
Chairpersons of the Swedish Bandy Association
Elected	Resigned	Name
1925	1950	Sune Almkvist
1950	1961	Gunnar Galin
1961	1964	Gösta Ellhammar
1964	1970	Arne Argus
1970	1983	Pontus Widén
1983	1988	Sten Lindström
1988	1997	Staffan Söderlund
1997	1999	Owe Svensson
1999	2006	Seppo Vaihela
2006	2014	Håkan Ramsin
2014	2019	Stig Bertilsson
2019	2022	Per-Anders Gustafsson
2022		Gisela Stockhaus

== See also ==
- List of bandy players awarded Stora Grabbars och Tjejers Märke
