= Lesjöfors IF =

Swedish sports club

- Full name: Lesjöfors idrottsförening
- Nicknames: Bandybaronerna
- Sport: association football bandy field hockey (earlier); Nordic skiing (earlier)
- Founded: 1924
- Based in: Lesjöfors, Sweden
- Stadium: Stålvallen

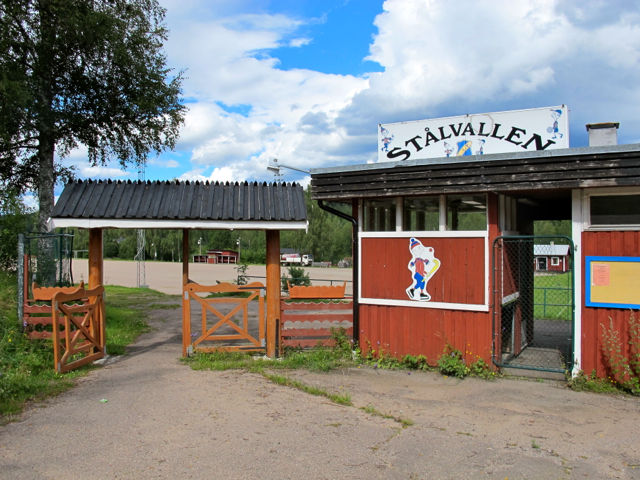
Lesjöfors IF's home ground Stålvallen.

Lesjöfors IF is a sports club in Lesjöfors, Sweden. The club was established in 1924 as a soccer and Nordic skiing club before adopting bandy by the late 1920s. and played 21 seasons in the Swedish men's bandy top division.
