= Patrick Johansson (bandy) =

Swedish bandy coach and former player (born 1963)

Personal information
- Date of birth: 24 September 1963 (age 61)
- Playing position: Forward

Club information
- Current team: Vetlanda (manager)

Senior career*
Years	Team	Apps^{†}	(Gls)^{†}
1979–1990	Vetlanda		
1986-1993	Selånger		
1994–1995	Nässjö		
1995–1997	Vetlanda		
1997–1998	Målilla		
1998–1999	Vetlanda		

National team
- Sweden
Medal record
Men's bandy
Representing Sweden
World Championships
Gold medal – first place	1987 Sweden	Team
Gold medal – first place	1993 Norway	Team
- * Senior club appearances and goals counted for the domestic league only. † Appearances (Goals).

Patrick Johansson (born 24 September 1963) is a Swedish bandy coach and former player. Johansson played most of his career for Vetlanda BK

Johansson was part of the 1987 and 1993 Bandy World Championship winning squads.

== Career ==
=== Club career ===
Johansson has represented Vetlanda, Selånger, Nässjö, Målilla

=== International career ===
Johansson was part of Swedish World Champions teams of 1987 and 1993

== Honours ==
=== Country ===
Sweden

- Bandy World Championship: 1987, 1993
