= Pontus Widén =

Swedish bandy player

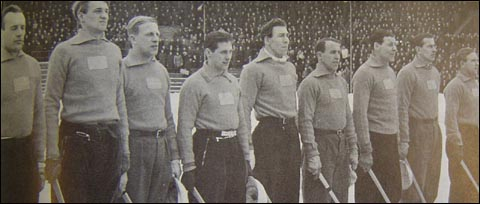
- Pontus Widén (second from the left) in the Team Sweden in February 1947

Sport
- Sport: bandy
- Team: Swedish national bandy team

Pontus Widén (10 November 1920 – 10 May 1983) was a Swedish bandy player and sports executive. He was chairman of Västerås SK 1955–1959, of Västmanlands Bandyförbund 1957–1967, of Swedish Bandy Association 1970–1983, and president for the International Bandy Federation 1978–1983.

Preceded by Grigory Granaturov	President of International Bandy Federation; 1978–1983	Succeeded by Grigory Granaturov
