= Michael Carlsson =

Swedish bandy player and manager

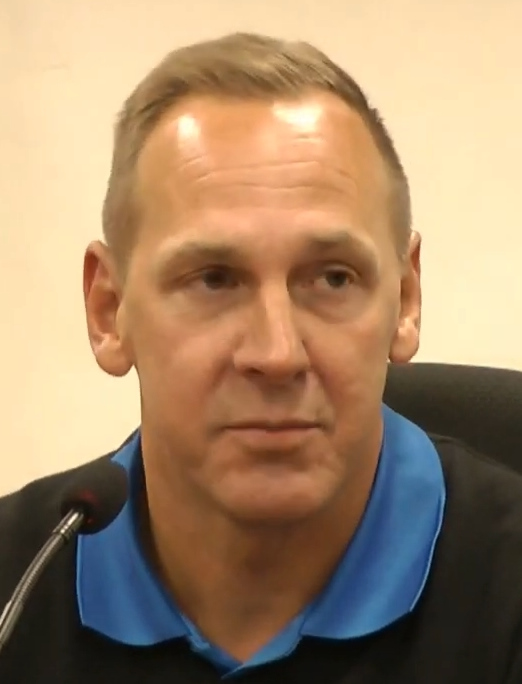
- Carlsson in 2019

Personal information
- Born: 31 May 1972 (age 53)
- Height: 1.89 m (6 ft 2 in)
- Playing position: Forward

Club information
- Current team: Västerås SK (manager)

Youth career
- Västerås SK

Senior career*
Years	Team	Apps^{†}	(Gls)^{†}
1991–2003	Västerås SK		
2003–2004	Vodnik		
2004–2011	Västerås SK		
2012–2013	Köpings IS		

National team
1998–2005	Sweden		

Teams managed
- 2014–: Västerås SK
Medal record
Men's bandy
Representing Sweden
World Championships
Gold medal – first place	2003 Arkhangelsk	Team
- * Senior club appearances and goals counted for the domestic league only. † Appearances (Goals).

Michael Carlsson (born 31 May 1972) is a Swedish bandy manager and former player (forward) and who currently manages Västerås SK. Carlsson was a youth product of Västerås SK and was spotted where he has stayed for his career apart from one year when he played in Russia for Vodnik. Carlsson has played for the Swedish national bandy team. In April 2019, he was appointed coach for the Swedish men's national team.

== Career ==
=== Club career ===
Carlsson has represented Västerås SK, Vodnik, Köpings IS.

=== International career ===
Carlsson was part of Swedish World Champions teams of 2003

== Honours ==
=== Country ===
Sweden

- Bandy World Championship: 2003
