= Västanfors IF =

Swedish sports club

- City: Fagersta, Sweden
- League: Allsvenskan
- Founded: 1916; 109 years ago
- Home arena: Västanfors IP
- Website: www.laget.se/VIFBANDY_

Västanfors IF, nicknamed Västanfläkt ("the Western Wind"), is a sports club in Fagersta, Sweden, mainly concentrated on playing bandy, and soccer, earlier even floorball. The team colours are red and white. The club was founded in 1916.

The club had played in the second level bandy league in Sweden, Allsvenskan since the start of the present Allsvenskan in 2007 but was relegated to Division 1 in 2012.

The club has played 32 seasons in the Swedish top division. and won the Swedish national championship in 1954.

The club also played floorball during the 1980s. The women's team won the Swedish national championship in 1983 and 1985, and won a silver medal in 1984.

== Honours ==
=== Domestic ===
- Swedish Champions:
  - Winners (1): 1954
