= Hans Johansson (bandy) =

Swedish bandy player (born 1962)

Personal information
- Born: 23 April 1962 (age 64)
- Playing position: Forward

Youth career
- Edsbyn

Senior career*
Years	Team	Apps^{†}	(Gls)^{†}
1978–1984	Edsbyn		
1984–1997	Västerås		
1997–1998	Yenisey		

National team
- Sweden
Medal record
Men's bandy
Representing Sweden
World Championships
Gold medal – first place	1983 Finland	Team
Gold medal – first place	1987 Sweden	Team
Gold medal – first place	1993 Norway	Team
Gold medal – first place	1995 Minnesota	Team
- * Senior club appearances and goals counted for the domestic league only. † Appearances (Goals).

Hans Elis "Hasse" Johansson (born 23 April 1962) is a former bandy player from Sweden and current coach of the Chinese national team.

== Career ==
=== Club career ===
Starting with youth bandy in Edsbyns IF, Johansson made his senior debut for the team in 1978 and played six seasons until he joined Västerås SK in 1984. Johansson won the Swedish Championship four times with Västerås in 1989, 1990, 1993 and 1996. In total, he scored 13 goals in the final games, a club record for Västerås.

On 30 November 1988, Johansson scored club-best eight goals for Västerås in a game ending 14–2 against Västanfors . On 20 November 1996, Johansson scored the then-fastest goal in Swedish bandy, when he scored for Västerås against Edsbyn after eight seconds (this goal is now the second fastest in Swedish elite bandy). Johansson has scored club-record 13 goals in the finals.

In 1997, Johansson joined Yenisey. With his spell in Yenisey, Johansson became the first Swedish player to play professionally in Russia.

=== International career ===
Johansson was part of Swedish World Champions teams of 1983, 1987, 1993 and 1995

== Honours ==
=== Country ===
Sweden

- Bandy World Championship: 1983, 1987, 1993, 1995
