= Hans Åström =

Swedish bandy player

Personal information
- Born: 28 November 1968 (age 57)
- Playing position: Forward

Youth career
- Bollnäs GIF

Senior career*
Years	Team	Apps^{†}	(Gls)^{†}
1988–1989	Bollnäs GIF		
1989–1993	Edsbyns IF		
1993–1997	Sandvikens AIK		
1997–2006	Bollnäs GIF		
2006–2007	Edsbyns IF		

National team
1992–1999	Sweden		
Medal record
Men's bandy
Representing Sweden
World Championships
Gold medal – first place	1993 Norway	Team
Gold medal – first place	1995 Minnesota	Team
Gold medal – first place	1997 Sweden	Team
- * Senior club appearances and goals counted for the domestic league only. † Appearances (Goals).

Hans "Måsen" Åström (born 28 November 1968) is a retired Swedish bandy player who played as a forward. Åström was brought up by Bollnäs GIF but only played in the first team for one season in his original spell although he did return later in his career. Hans has represented the Swedish national bandy team.

He was named Bandy Leader of the Year in 2011. In 2019, he was a coach for the Great Britain national bandy team at that year's world championship. He was inducted into the Swedish Bandy Hall of Fame in 2020.

== Family ==
He is a cousin of Prince Daniel, Duke of Västergötland. He is a godfather of Prince Oscar, second child of Daniel and Princess Victoria of Sweden.
