= IF Boltic =

- City: Karlstad, Sweden
- Founded: 1 November 1946
- Home arena: Tingvalla isstadion

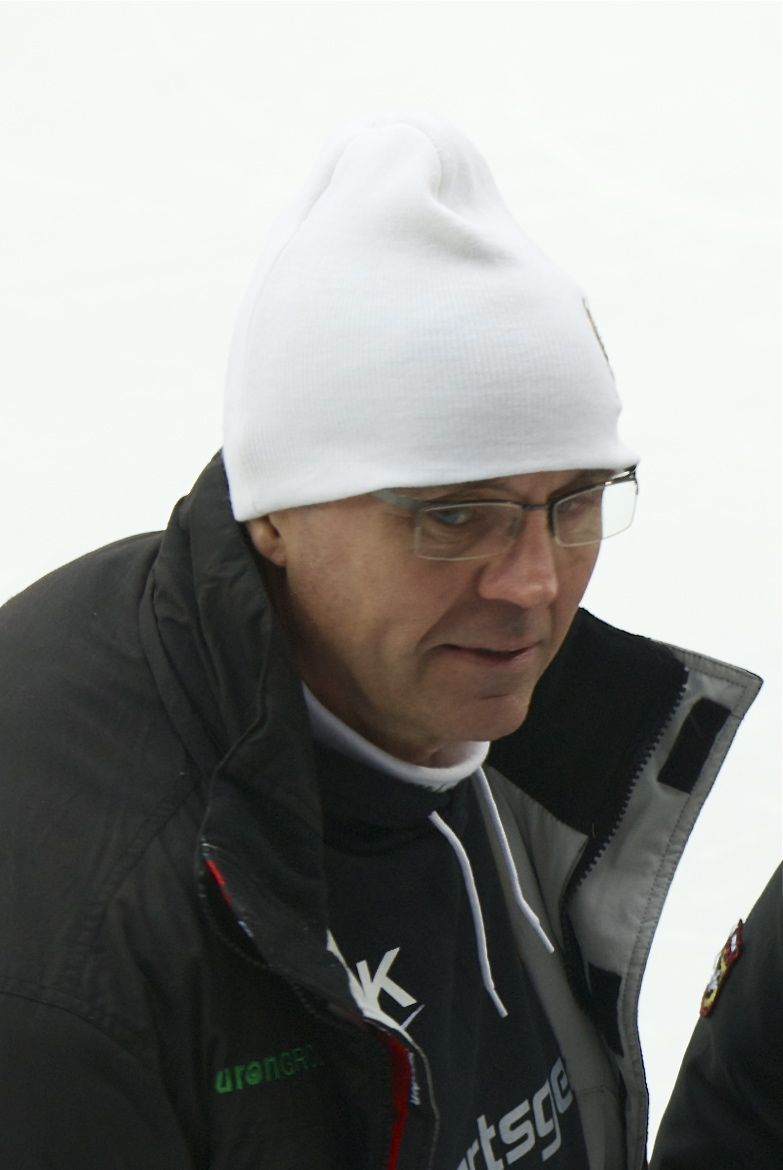
Stefan Karlsson has become Swedish champion for Boltic

IF Boltic is a Swedish sports club from the town Karlstad. The club was founded in the district of Herrhagen in Karlstad on 1 November 1946.

The name Boltic was created due to the interest for British football, by adding the beginning of Bolton to the end of Celtic. Together, this makes Boltic. Originally, the club did not only play bandy, but had also sections for handball and association football.

IF Boltic was for a number of years the most successful bandy team in Sweden and also one of the best in the world. IF Boltic was until 2021 the only club which had managed to become Swedish champion for both men and women the same year.

IF Boltic was merged with IF Göta and formed the new club BS BolticGöta on 11 May 2000. However, the first team again played as IF Boltic from the winter of 2008–09. The club's general meeting then decided on 26 June 2014 to take back the club's old name IF Boltic. BS BolticGöta was thus history.

== Men's team ==
In the early and mid-1980s IF Boltic dominated Swedish bandy and became Swedish champions eight times from 1979 to 1988, all years except for 1986 and 1987 when they lost the finals against Vetlanda BK and IFK Motala respectively. Another national championship was won in 1995. The team also won the World Cup and the European Cup a number of times.

=== Honours ===
==== Domestic ====
- Swedish Champions:
  - Winners (9): 1979, 1980, 1981, 1982, 1983, 1984, 1985, 1988, 1995
  - Runners-up (4): 1986, 1987, 1992, 1993

==== International ====
- World Cup:
  - Winners (6): 1980, 1981, 1985, 1986, 1995, 1996
  - Runners-up (1): 1982
- European Cup:
  - Winners (6): 1979, 1981, 1982, 1984, 1985, 1995
  - Runners-up (4): 1980, 1983

== Women's team ==
IF Boltic were also successful in women's bandy where they were dominant in the 1980s and reached the final of the women's Swedish masters in nine successive seasons, winning six of them.

=== Honours ===
- Swedish Champions:
  - Winners (6): 1982, 1984, 1985, 1986, 1987, 1989
  - Runners-up (3): 1983, 1988, 1990

== See also ==
- Category:IF Boltic players
