= Vetlanda BK =

- City: Vetlanda, Sweden
- League: Elitserien
- Founded: 6 December 1944; 81 years ago
- Home arena: Hydro Arena
- Head coach: Sergej In-Fa-Lin
- Website: vetlandabk.se
| Home colours | Away colours |

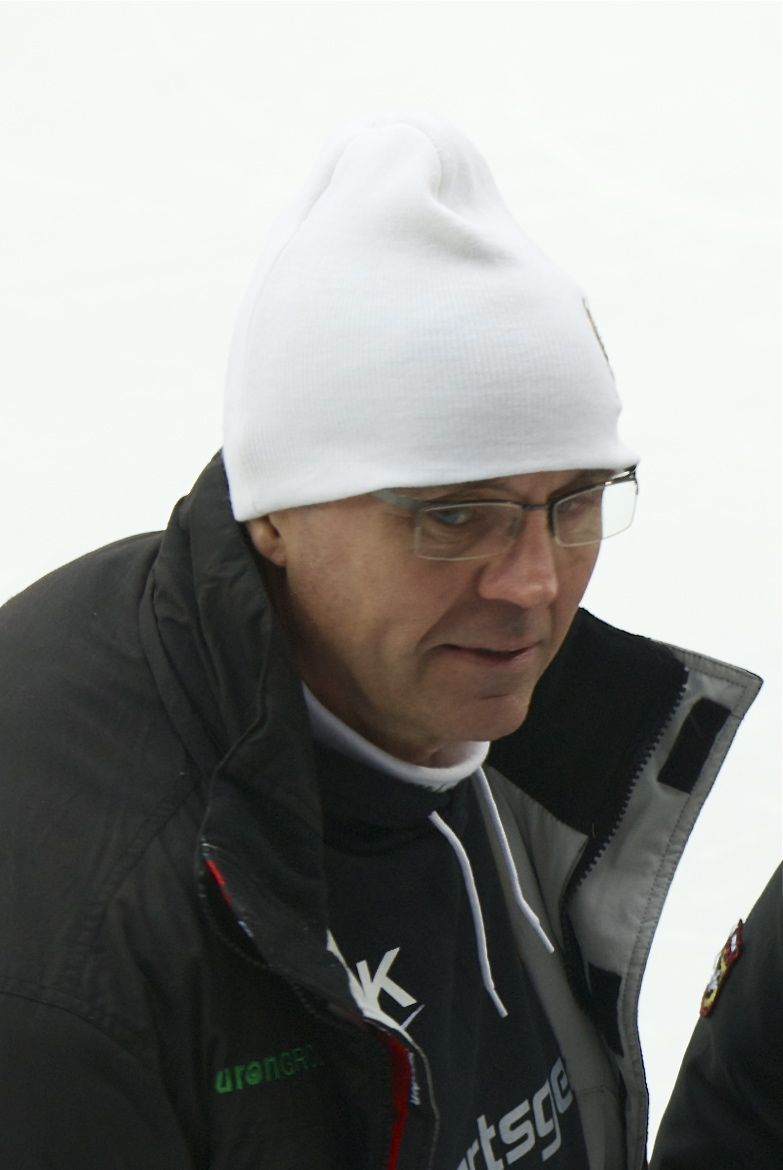
Stefan Karlsson became Swedish champion for Vetlanda in 1986

Vetlanda BK is a bandy club in Vetlanda, Sweden.

Vetlanda BK was established in December 1944. While the exact date seems to be unknown, 6 December is usually credited. On 1 January 1945 the club played its first game, 4–4 on away soil against Flugeby.

The home arena is called Hydro Arena. The team colour is yellow. Vetlanda BK has won the Swedish bandy championship three times, 1986, 1991 and 1992 and European Cup once, 1991

== Squad ==
As of 12 March 2015

Note: Flags indicate national team as defined under FIB eligibility rules. Players may hold more than one non-FIB nationality.

| No. | Pos. | Nation | Player |
|---|---|---|---|
| 1 | GK | (Sweden) SWE | Jonas Persson |
| 3 | DF | (Sweden) SWE | Pontus Sjölund |
| 4 | MF | (Sweden) SWE | Hampus Karlberg |
| 5 | MF | (Sweden) SWE | Pontus Blomberg |
| 7 | MF | (Sweden) SWE | Daniel Johansson |
| 8 | FW | (Sweden) SWE | Joakim Andersson |
| 9 | DF | (Sweden) SWE | Philip Lennartsson |
| 13 | DF | (Sweden) SWE | Viktor Törner |
| 16 | MF | (Sweden) SWE | Erik Ivarsson |
| 17 | MF | (Sweden) SWE | Filip Bringe |
| 21 | MF | (Russia) RUS | Anatoly Suzdalev |

| No. | Pos. | Nation | Player |
|---|---|---|---|
| 22 | FW | (Sweden) SWE | Christian Mickelsson |
| 23 | MF | (Sweden) SWE | Johan Löfstedt |
| 24 | FW | (Sweden) SWE | Pontus Vilén |
| 25 | DF | (Sweden) SWE | Sebastian Ytterell |
| 30 | GK | (Sweden) SWE | Oscar Löfqvist |
| 39 | MF | (Sweden) SWE | Martin Landström |
| 42 | DF | (Sweden) SWE | Jesper Hvornum |
| 43 | MF | (Sweden) SWE | Robin Folkesson |
| 51 | MF | (Finland) FIN | Tomi Hauska |
| 54 | GK | (Sweden) SWE | Philip Svensk |
| 69 | FW | (Sweden) SWE | Andreas Lysell |

== Honours ==
=== Domestic ===
- Swedish Champions:
  - Winners (3): 1986, 1991, 1992
  - Runners-up (4): 1988, 1989, 1994, 1995

=== International ===
- European Cup:
  - Winners (1): 1991
