= 2014–15 Russian Bandy Super League =

- League: Russian Bandy Super League
- Sport: Bandy
- Duration: 8 November 2014 – 21 March 2015
- Teams: 13

Regular season
- League winner: Yenisey
- Top scorer: Christoffer Edlund (62 goals)

Final
- Champions: Yenisey
- Runners-up: Dynamo Moscow

Russian Bandy Super League seasons
- 2013–14 2015–16

The 2014–2015 season of the Russian Bandy Super League was played from 8 November 2014 until 21 March 2015, when the Russian champions were named after a play-off.

== Teams ==
Locations of teams in the 2014–15 Russian Bandy Super League

Team	Location	Stadium	Capacity
Baykal-Energiya	Irkutsk	Rekord Stadium	5,300
Dynamo Moscow	Moscow	Ice Palace Krylatskoye	8,000
Dynamo Kazan	Kazan	Raketa Stadium	7,500
Kuzbass	Kemerovo	Khimik Stadium	32,000
Rodina	Kirov	Rodina Stadium	7,500
Sibselmash	Novosibirsk	Sibselmash Stadium	8,000
SKA-Neftyanik	Khabarovsk	Arena Yerofey	10,000
Start	Nizhny Novgorod	Start Stadium	6,200
Uralsky Trubnik	Pervouralsk	Uralskiy Trubnik Stadium	6,000
Vodnik	Arkhangelsk	Trud Stadium	10,000
Volga	Ulyanovsk	Volga-Sport-Arena	5,000
Yenisey	Krasnoyarsk	Yenisey Stadium	10,000
Zorky	Krasnogorsk	Zorky Stadium	8,000

== League table ==
Pos	Team	Pld	W	D	L	GF	GA	GD	Pts	
1	Yenisey	24	18	1	5	175	81	+94	55	Advance to Knock-out stage
2	Dynamo Moscow	24	17	1	6	154	80	+74	52	Advance to Knock-out stage
3	Baykal-Energiya	24	16	4	4	132	83	+49	52	Advance to Knock-out stage
4	SKA-Neftyanik	24	14	6	4	114	79	+35	48	Advance to Knock-out stage
5	Zorky	24	16	0	8	150	116	+34	48	Advance to Knock-out stage
6	Rodina	24	13	4	7	104	88	+16	43	Advance to Knock-out stage
7	Vodnik	24	9	5	10	101	101	0	32	Advance to Knock-out stage
8	Kuzbass	24	9	4	11	107	135	−28	31	Advance to Knock-out stage
9	Uralsky Trubnik	24	8	3	13	77	121	−44	27	
10	Start	24	6	4	14	86	102	−16	22	
11	Sibselmash	24	6	4	14	87	124	−37	22	
12	Dynamo Kazan	24	3	2	19	72	160	−88	11	
13	Volga	24	1	2	21	73	162	−89	5	

Updated to match(es) played on completed. Source:

=== Knock-out stage ===
Quarter-finals
Yenisey	5	15	11
Kuzbass	6	2	2
SKA-Neftyanik	1	8	4
Zorky	5	4	1
Dynamo Moscow	7	6
Vodnik	4	1
Baykal-Energiya	6	5	5
Rodina	9	2	3

Semi-finals
Yenisey	5	9	2
SKA-Neftyanik	3	2	0
Dynamo Moscow	6	5	5
Baykal-Energiya	3	1	1

Final
21 March – Khabarovsk
Yenisey	5
Dynamo Moscow	2
