= 2013–14 Russian Bandy Super League =

- League: Russian Bandy Super League
- Sport: Bandy
- Duration: 8 November 2013 – 30 March 2014
- Number of teams: 13

Regular season
- League winners: Dynamo Moscow
- Top scorer: Alexey Dorovskikh (60 goals)

Final
- Champions: Yenisey
- Runners-up: Dynamo Moscow

Russian Bandy Super League seasons
- ← 2012–13 2014–15 →

The 2013–2014 season of the Russian Bandy Super League was played from November 2013 until March 2014, when the Russian champions were named after a play-off.

== Teams ==
Locations of teams in the 2013–14 Russian Bandy Super League

Team	Location	Stadium	Capacity
Dynamo Moscow	Moscow	Ice Palace Krylatskoye	8,000
Dynamo Kazan	Kazan	Raketa Stadium	7,500
Yenisey	Krasnoyarsk	Yenisey Stadium	10,000
Zorky	Krasnogorsk	Zorky Stadium	8,000
Kuzbass	Kemerovo	Khimik Stadium	32,000
Sibselmash	Novosibirsk	Sibselmash Stadium	8,000
Baykal-Energiya	Irkutsk	Rekord Stadium	5,300
SKA-Neftyanik	Khabarovsk	Arena Yerofey	10,000
Vodnik	Arkhangelsk	Trud Stadium	10,000
Volga	Ulyanovsk	Trud Stadium	8,300
Start	Nizhny Novgorod	Start Stadium	6,200
Uralsky Trubnik	Pervouralsk	Uralskiy Trubnik Stadium	6,000
Rodina	Kirov	Rodina Stadium	7,500

== League table ==
Pos	Team	Pld	W	D	L	GF	GA	GD	Pts	
1	Dynamo Moscow	24	19	2	3	151	73	+78	59	Advance to Quarter-finals
2	Yenisey	24	17	3	4	128	69	+59	54	Advance to Quarter-finals
3	Baykal-Energiya	24	15	5	4	117	83	+34	50	Advance to Quarter-finals
4	Zorky	24	12	3	9	138	104	+34	39	Advance to Round of 16
5	Vodnik	24	11	2	11	103	116	−13	35	Advance to Round of 16
6	Dynamo Kazan	24	11	2	11	116	110	+6	35	Advance to Round of 16
7	SKA-Neftyanik	24	10	5	9	101	107	−6	35	Advance to Round of 16
8	Rodina	24	9	4	11	89	108	−19	31	Advance to Round of 16
9	Sibselmash	24	9	2	13	71	89	−18	29	Advance to Round of 16
10	Kuzbass	24	7	4	13	98	136	−38	25	Advance to Round of 16
11	Volga	24	7	3	14	92	124	−32	24	Advance to Round of 16
12	Uralsky Trubnik	24	6	2	16	92	118	−26	20	Advance to Round of 16
13	Start	24	3	3	18	68	127	−59	12	Advance to Round of 16

Updated to match(es) played on completed. Source:

=== Knock-out stage ===
Round of 16
Rodina	4	2
Sibselmash	6	3
Zorky	5	9
Start	3	4
Vodnik	4	3	6
Uralsky Trubnik	7	2	5
SKA-Neftyanik	2	5	6
Kuzbass	11	3	3
Dynamo Kazan	7	6
Volga	3	1

Quarter-finals
Dynamo Moscow	2	18
Sibselmash	1	3
Zorky	3	10	7
Vodnik	6	2	2
Yenisey	3	9	4
SKA-Neftyanik	4	0	2
Baykal-Energiya	0	1
Dynamo Kazan	4	5

Semi-finals
Dynamo Moscow	9	4	9
Zorky	3	1	2
Yenisey	10	4	5	3
Dynamo Kazan	3	5	1	2

Final
30 March – Moscow
Dynamo Moscow	5
Yenisey	6

== Matches ==
Home \ Away	BE	DK	DM	KUZ	ROD	SIB	SKAN	STA	UT	VOD	VOL	YEN	ZOR
Baykal-Energiya	—	8–1	3–3	4–3	9–2	6–3	4–6	5–2	6–2	6–3	5–4	5–4	4–4
Dynamo Kazan	4–6	—	3–8	8–6	6–6	5–3	6–2	9–2	3–4	7–0	5–7	7–9	5–3
Dynamo Moscow	6–6	8–6	—	10–4	9–4	7–2	10–2	8–1	6–2	4–5	15–0	5–7	5–1
Kuzbass	4–7	2–8	4–5	—	4–3	2–1	3–3	6–4	4–4	6–7	4–5	5–4	4–12
Rodina	2–1	3–4	1–8	4–3	—	6–5	4–1	3–5	4–3	4–8	6–3	2–2	5–5
Sibselmash	3–6	3–3	1–2	4–4	4–3	—	3–1	2–1	6–4	7–1	2–1	2–6	2–1
SKA-Neftyanik	3–3	7–2	4–8	7–4	6–4	5–3	—	4–1	8–5	7–7	4–4	4–5	5–4
Start	5–6	1–3	3–4	3–6	2–2	4–5	3–3	—	3–4	3–4	6–4	5–5	3–9
Uralsky Trubnik	3–8	4–7	3–4	5–6	5–6	2–1	7–5	4–5	—	4–1	3–4	3–3	5–6
Vodnik	4–4	7–4	3–4	2–6	3–4	2–4	6–2	9–1	5–4	—	7–4	7–6	6–5
Volga	4–6	2–5	3–8	4–4	3–8	4–1	5–1	9–1	4–5	3–0	—	3–7	4–10
Yenisey	5–0	4–1	4–1	11–0	w/o (Note: Rodina did not show up due to delayed flights. Yenisey won on walk/over and was awarded 3 points.)	6–1	3–4	4–1	6–3	9–2	5–2	—	5–3
Zorky	4–1	5–4	1–3	11–4	9–3	9–4	3–7	9–3	7–4	8–4	6–6	3–8	—

Updated to match(es) played on completed. Source:
