= 2012–13 Russian Bandy Super League =

- League: Super League
- Sport: bandy
- Duration: 8 November 2013 – 24 March 2014
- Number of teams: 14

Regular season
- League winners: Zorky
- Top scorer: Patrik Nilsson (57 goals)
- Relegated to Supreme League: Sayan-Khakassia

Final
- Champions: Dynamo Moscow
- Runners-up: Zorky

Russian Bandy Super League seasons
- ← 2011–12 2013–14 →

The 2012–2013 season of the Russian Bandy Super League was played from November 2013 until March 2014, when the Russian champions were named after a play-off.

== Teams ==
Locations of teams in the 2012–13 Russian Bandy Super League

Team	Location	Stadium	Capacity
Dynamo Moscow	Moscow	Ice Palace Krylatskoye	8,000
Dynamo Kazan	Kazan	Raketa Stadium	7,500
Yenisey	Krasnoyarsk	Yenisey Stadium	10,000
Zorky	Krasnogorsk	Zorky Stadium	8,000
Kuzbass	Kemerovo	Khimik Stadium	32,000
Sibselmash	Novosibirsk	Sibselmash Stadium	8,000
Baykal-Energiya	Irkutsk	Trud Stadium	17,800
SKA-Neftyanik	Khabarovsk	Neftyanik Stadium	5,000
Vodnik	Arkhangelsk	Trud Stadium	10,000
Volga	Ulyanovsk	Trud Stadium	8,300
Start	Nizhny Novgorod	Start Stadium	6,200
Uralsky Trubnik	Pervouralsk	Uralskiy Trubnik Stadium	6,000
Rodina	Kirov	Rodina Stadium	7,500
Sayany-Khakassia	Abakan	Sayany Stadium	21,000

== League table ==
Pos	Team	Pld	W	D	L	GF	GA	GD	Pts	
1	Zorky	26	21	1	4	159	91	+68	64	Advance to Quarter-finals
2	Dynamo Moscow	26	21	1	4	186	113	+73	64	Advance to Quarter-finals
3	Yenisey	26	18	5	3	144	76	+68	59	Advance to Quarter-finals
4	Dynamo Kazan	26	16	3	7	134	118	+16	51	Advance to Quarter-finals
5	Rodina	26	14	2	10	108	105	+3	44	Advance to Round of 16
6	Sibselmash	26	12	3	11	93	100	−7	39	Advance to Round of 16
7	Baykal-Energiya	26	10	7	9	112	97	+15	37	Advance to Round of 16
8	SKA-Neftyanik	26	10	3	13	101	105	−4	33	Advance to Round of 16
9	Start	26	9	2	15	101	138	−37	29	Advance to Round of 16
10	Kuzbass	26	8	1	17	111	117	−6	25	Advance to Round of 16
11	Vodnik	26	7	3	16	106	136	−30	24	Advance to Round of 16
12	Volga	26	7	2	17	90	142	−52	23	Advance to Round of 16
13	Sayany-Khakassia	26	6	2	18	81	126	−45	20	
14	Uralsky Trubnik	26	4	3	19	85	147	−62	15	

Updated to match(es) played on completed. Source:

=== Knock-out stage ===
Round of 16
SKA-Neftyanik	3	8
Start	6	4
Rodina	6	6
Volga	0	2
Baykal-Energiya	5	6
Kuzbass	6	2
Sibselmash	2	8
Vodnik	2	1

Quarter-finals
Zorky	6	6
SKA-Neftyanik	3	4
Dynamo Kazan	3	6
Rodina	3	3
Dynamo Moscow	8	7
Baykal-Energiya	2	2
Yenisey	3	4
Sibselmash	3	1

Semi-finals
Zorky	6	5	6
Dynamo Kazan	5	8	5
Dynamo Moscow	2	8
Yenisey	1	4

Final
24 March – Kirov
Zorky	2
Dynamo Moscow	3

== Matches ==
Home \ Away	BE	DK	DM	KUZ	ROD	SIB	SK	SKAN	STA	UT	VOD	VOL	YEN	ZOR
Baykal-Energiya	—	4–7	4–5	5–3	1–3	2–3	3–1	6–1	7–2	4–1	3–3	6–1	2–2	5–6
Dynamo Kazan	3–6	—	4–11	3–2	4–3	3–2	6–3	9–3	10–3	6–3	4–4	6–2	5–3	6–7
Dynamo Moscow	5–5	8–2	—	11–7	8–5	12–3	8–5	7–5	16–4	12–5	11–5	9–6	6–7	7–6
Kuzbass	8–5	7–8	3–4	—	2–4	3–7	0–1	5–7	4–2	11–2	6–4	8–3	3–3	2–5
Rodina	3–3	6–3	2–3	7–3	—	3–2	4–2	6–4	8–6	3–2	5–3	7–4	5–10	4–3
Sibselmash	3–3	6–2	2–5	6–3	2–2	—	5–3	1–0	5–1	4–2	5–6	5–1	2–4	2–5
Sayany-Khakassia	2–8	4–5	3–6	4–1	5–0	4–5	—	6–6	6–4	3–3	8–4	5–3	2–9	2–4
SKA-Neftyanik	6–6	1–3	2–5	5–2	9–5	1–4	2–0	—	1–2	5–1	6–3	6–1	3–5	3–8
Start	4–3	5–5	3–4	5–3	6–5	5–3	4–3	3–5	—	11–5	3–1	4–5	4–4	4–3
Uralsky Trubnik	5–6	6–9	1–7	1–5	3–4	5–5	3–1	3–1	3–4	—	3–5	6–4	3–7	2–9
Vodnik	3–3	3–4	2–4	1–7	1–6	8–2	9–2	3–4	6–4	3–8	—	10–3	1–6	7–4
Volga	4–6	3–7	6–4	5–6	7–3	3–5	4–3	3–1	4–2	3–3	7–4	—	0–3	6–6
Yenisey	8–5	5–5	10–4	4–3	3–1	7–1	6–1	3–3	6–4	5–2	13–3	7–0	—	2–4
Zorky	5–1	8–5	6–4	5–4	6–4	7–3	14–2	5–2	4–2	10–4	5–4	10–2	4–2	—

Updated to match(es) played on completed. Source:
