= 2011–12 Russian Bandy Super League =

- League: Russian Bandy Super League
- Sport: Bandy
- Duration: 10 November 2011 – 25 March 2012
- Teams: 14

Regular season
- League winner: Yenisey
- Top scorer: Sergey Lomanov (68 goals)

Final
- Champions: Dynamo Moscow
- Runners-up: Dynamo Kazan

Russian Bandy Super League seasons
- 2010–11 2012–13

The 2011–12 Russian Bandy Super League was the 20th season of the present highest Russian men's bandy top division, Russian Bandy Super League. The regular season began on 10 November 2011, and the final was played in Arkhangelsk on 25 March 2012.

== Teams ==
Locations of teams in the 2014–15 Russian Bandy Super League

Team	Location	Stadium	Capacity
Baykal-Energiya	Irkutsk	Rekord Stadium	5,300
Dynamo Moscow	Moscow	Ice Palace Krylatskoye	8,000
Dynamo Kazan	Kazan	Raketa Stadium	7,500
Kuzbass	Kemerovo	Khimik Stadium	32,000
Murmansk	Murmansk	Stroitel Stadium	5,000
Rodina	Kirov	Rodina Stadium	7,500
Sibselmash	Novosibirsk	Sibselmash Stadium	8,000
SKA-Neftyanik	Khabarovsk	Arena Yerofey	10,000
Start	Nizhny Novgorod	Start Stadium	6,200
Uralsky Trubnik	Pervouralsk	Uralskiy Trubnik Stadium	6,000
Vodnik	Arkhangelsk	Trud Stadium	10,000
Volga	Ulyanovsk	Volga-Sport-Arena	5,000
Yenisey	Krasnoyarsk	Yenisey Stadium	10,000
Zorky	Krasnogorsk	Zorky Stadium	8,000
