= 2015–16 Russian Bandy Super League =

- League: Russian Bandy Super League
- Sport: Bandy
- Duration: 8 November 2015 – 26 March 2016
- Teams: 13

Regular season
- Top scorer: Yevgeny Ivanushkin (62 goals)

Final
- Champions: Yenisey
- Runners-up: Baykal-Energiya

Russian Bandy Super League seasons

The 2015–16 Russian Bandy Super League is the 24rd season of the present highest Russian men's bandy top division, Russian Bandy Super League. The regular season began on 8 November 2015, and the final was played on 26 March 2016, when Yenisey beat Baykal-Energiya, thus becoming champions for the third season in a row.

== Teams ==
Locations of teams in the 2015–16 Russian Bandy Super League

Team	Location	Stadium	Capacity
Baykal-Energiya	Irkutsk	Rekord Stadium	5,300
Dynamo Moscow	Moscow	Ice Palace Krylatskoye	8,000
Dynamo Kazan	Kazan	Raketa Stadium	7,500
Kuzbass	Kemerovo	Khimik Stadium	32,000
Rodina	Kirov	Rodina Stadium	7,500
Sibselmash	Novosibirsk	Sibselmash Stadium	8,000
SKA-Neftyanik	Khabarovsk	Arena Yerofey	10,000
Start	Nizhny Novgorod	Start Stadium	6,200
Uralsky Trubnik	Pervouralsk	Uralsky Trubnik Stadium	6,000
Vodnik	Arkhangelsk	Trud Stadium	10,000
Volga	Ulyanovsk	Volga-Sport-Arena	5,000
Yenisey	Krasnoyarsk	Yenisey Stadium	10,000
Zorky	Krasnogorsk	Zorky Stadium	8,000

== League table ==
Pos	Team	Pld	W	D	L	GF	GA	GD	Pts	
1	Yenisey	24	22	0	2	220	54	+166	66	Advance to Knock-out stage
2	Baykal-Energiya	24	20	1	3	129	72	+57	61	Advance to Knock-out stage
3	SKA-Neftyanik	24	19	2	3	197	84	+113	59	Advance to Knock-out stage
4	Dynamo Moscow	24	17	2	5	166	101	+65	53	Advance to Knock-out stage
5	Vodnik	24	10	3	11	113	113	0	33	Advance to Knock-out stage
6	Kuzbass	24	10	3	11	129	143	−14	33	Advance to Knock-out stage
7	Start	24	9	5	10	84	123	−39	32	Advance to Knock-out stage
8	Rodina	24	8	5	11	88	115	−27	29	Advance to Knock-out stage
9	Volga	24	8	1	15	105	141	−36	25	
10	Sibselmash	24	6	3	15	99	181	−82	21	
11	Zorky	24	6	2	16	75	124	−49	20	
12	Uralsky Trubnik	24	5	3	16	74	126	−52	18	
13	Dynamo Kazan	24	0	2	22	64	166	−102	2	

Updated to match(es) played on completed. Source:

=== Knock-out stage ===
Quarter-finals
Rodina	1	4
Yenisey	11	6
Vodnik	7	6
Dynamo Moscow	8	9
Kuzbass	1	3
SKA-Neftyanik	2	7
Start	1	4
Baykal-Energiya	7	10

Semi-finals
Yenisey	8	9	5
Dynamo Moscow	3	4	4
SKA-Neftyanik	2	4	5	5	1
Baykal-Energiya	5	6	4	3	4

Final
Yenisey	5
Baykal-Energiya	1
