= 2016–17 Russian Bandy Super League =

2016–17 Russian Bandy Super League XXVth Russian Bandy Championship
- League: Russian Bandy Super League
- Sport: Bandy
- Duration: 7 November 2016 – 26 March 2017
- Number of teams: 12

Regular season
- Top scorer: Artem Bondarenko (76 goals)

Final
- Champions: SKA-Neftyanik
- Runners-up: Baykal-Energiya

Russian Bandy Super League seasons
- ← 2015–16 2017–18 →

The 2016–17 Russian Bandy Super League is the 25th season of the present highest Russian men's bandy top division, Russian Bandy Super League. The regular season began on 7 November 2016, and the final was played on 26 March 2016, when SKA-Neftyanik became Russian champion for the first time.

In their last match of the regular season, Vodnik Arkhangelsk played against Baykal-Energiya. The loss apparently would make Vodnik facing a weaker team in the playoffs, therefore the team started to score own goals. Baykal-Energiya joined, apparently for fun. Vodnik won 11-9, with all goals scored in the match being own goals. The two teams are facing sanctions from the Russian Bandy Federation.

== Teams ==
Locations of teams in the 2016–17 Russian Bandy Super League
Red: Group West; Blue: Group East.

Team	Location	Stadium	Capacity
Baykal-Energiya	Irkutsk	Rekord Stadium	5,300
Dynamo Moscow	Moscow	Ice Palace Krylatskoye	8,000
Dynamo Kazan	Kazan	Raketa Stadium	7,500
Kuzbass	Kemerovo	Khimik Stadium	32,000
Rodina	Kirov	Rodina Stadium	7,500
Sibselmash	Novosibirsk	Sibselmash Stadium	8,000
SKA-Neftyanik	Khabarovsk	Arena Yerofey	10,000
Start	Nizhny Novgorod	Start Stadium	6,200
Uralsky Trubnik	Pervouralsk	Uralsky Trubnik Stadium	6,000
Vodnik	Arkhangelsk	Trud Stadium	10,000
Volga	Ulyanovsk	Volga-Sport-Arena	5,000
Yenisey	Krasnoyarsk	Yenisey Stadium	10,000

== Regular season ==
=== First round ===
==== Group West ====
Pos	Team	Pld	W	D	L	GF	GA	GD	Pts	Qualification
1	Volga	20	15	3	2	113	68	+45	48	Group I
2	Vodnik	20	15	2	3	83	52	+31	47	Group I
3	Dynamo Moscow	20	8	1	11	74	102	−28	25	Group I
4	Dynamo Kazan	20	6	5	9	68	71	−3	23	Group I
5	Rodina	20	4	4	12	50	73	−23	16	Group II
6	Start	20	3	3	14	56	78	−22	12	Group II

Source: Russian Bandy Federation

==== Group East ====
Pos	Team	Pld	W	D	L	GF	GA	GD	Pts	Qualification
1	SKA-Neftyanik	20	18	1	1	170	70	+100	55	Group I
2	Yenisey	20	13	0	7	103	71	+32	39	Group I
3	Baykal-Energiya	20	10	1	9	96	108	−12	31	Group I
4	Uralsky Trubnik	20	7	2	11	76	95	−19	23	Group I
5	Kuzbass	20	5	3	12	100	127	−27	18	Group II
6	Sibselmash	20	3	1	16	78	152	−74	10	Group II

Source: Russian Bandy Federation

=== Second round ===
==== Group I ====
Pos	Team	Pld	W	D	L	GF	GA	GD	Pts	Qualification
1	SKA-Neftyanik	8	8	0	0	88	31	+57	24	Quarter-finals
2	Baykal-Energiya	8	8	0	0	51	26	+25	24	Quarter-finals
3	Uralsky Trubnik	8	7	0	1	37	19	+18	21	Quarter-finals
4	Yenisey	8	6	1	1	52	21	+31	19	Quarter-finals
5	Volga	8	1	1	6	31	59	−28	4	Quarter-finals
6	Vodnik	8	1	0	7	22	41	−19	3	Quarter-finals
7	Dynamo Kazan	8	0	0	8	19	54	−35	0	Qualification play-off
8	Dynamo Moscow	8	0	0	8	25	74	−49	0	Qualification play-off

Source: Russian Bandy Federation

==== Group II ====
Pos	Team	Pld	W	D	L	GF	GA	GD	Pts	Qualification
1	Sibselmash	6	4	1	1	36	21	+15	13	Qualification play-off
2	Kuzbass	6	4	1	1	42	33	+9	13	Qualification play-off
3	Start	6	2	0	4	26	31	−5	6	
4	Rodina	6	0	2	4	16	35	−19	2	

Source: Russian Bandy Federation

== Knock-out stage ==
Qualification play-off 1, 4 March 2017
Sibselmash	9	6
Dynamo Moscow	3	7
Kuzbass	4	4
Dynamo Kazan	2	4

Quarterfinals; 9–15 March 2017
SKA-Neftyanik	15	10	10
Sibselmash	5	6	5
Yenisey	9	7	7
Volga	4	3	2
Uralsky Trubnik	3	2	3	3
Vodnik	2	7	4	5
Baykal-Energiya	8	9	6
Kuzbass	2	4	2

Semifinals; 23–24 March 2017
SKA-Neftyanik	2
Yenisey	1
Vodnik	1
Baykal-Energiya	4

Final; 26 March 2017
SKA-Neftyanik	6
Baykal-Energiya	2
Third place 25 March 2017
Yenisey	11
Vodnik	2
