= Russian Bandy Supreme League =

- Current season, competition or edition: 2026/27 Russian Bandy Supreme League
- Sport: Bandy
- Country: Russia; Kazakhstan
- Most recent champion: Baykal-Energiya
- Promotion to: Russian Bandy Super League
- Website: http://www.rusbandy.ru/season/

The Russian Bandy Supreme League or the Vysshaya Liga (Russian: Всероссийские соревнования Высшая лига) is the second tier of Russian bandy, below Russian Bandy Super League. It comprises 20 teams.

The teams play around 24 games in a season and move to a Group A and Group B play-off section. From there the quarter-finals, semi-finals and finals are all single elimination games. The seasons generally run from December to the finals in March.

The league is mainly a development league as can be seen by the number of affiliated clubs, named Rodina-2 for example, although a few independent clubs are present.

== Current teams ==
The teams playing in the Russian Vysshaya Liga for the 2026–27 season are below: So far, not all teams have been put into their respectable subgroups, as the league starts in December.

Subgroup №	Group №	Team	City	Stadium
I	undefined	Dynamo-2	Moscow	Ice Palace Krylatskoye
I	undefined	Stroitel	Syktyvkar	Respublikansky Stadion
I	undefined	Zorky	Krasnogorsk	Zorky Stadium
I	undefined	Vodnik-2	Arkhangelsk	Trud Stadium
I	undefined	Start	Nizhny Novgorod	Start Stadium
I	undefined	Monchegorsk	Monchegorsk	MAU DO SSH
I	undefined	Murman	Murmansk	Stroitel Stadium
unknown	undefined	Kuzbass-2	Kemerovo	Kuzbass Ice Palace
unknown	undefined	SKA-Neftyanik-2	Khabarovsk	Arena Yerofey
unknown	undefined	Yenisey-2	Krasnoyarsk	Arena Yenisey
unknown	undefined	Vostok	Arsenyev	Vostok Stadium
unknown	undefined	Sibselmash-2	Novosibirsk	Sibselmash Stadium
unknown	undefined	Sayany-2	Abakan	Sayany Stadium
unknown	undefined	Akademia Uralsky Trubnik	Pervouralsk	Uralsky Trubnik Stadium
unknown	undefined	Mayak	Krasnoturyinsk	Mayak Stadium
unknown	undefined	Znamya-Udmurtiya	Votkinsk	Znamya Stadium
unknown	undefined	Kirovets	Ufa	Dynamo Stadium
unknown	undefined	Nikelshchik	Verkhny Ufaley	Nikelshchik Stadium
unknown	undefined	Volga-M	Ulyanovsk	Volga-Sport-Arena
unknown	undefined	Ak Bars-Raketa-2	Kazan	Raketa Stadium
