= Vostok Arsenyev =

Vostok
- City: Arsenyev, Russia
- League: Russian Bandy Supreme League
- Division: Group 3
- Founded: 1953; 72 years ago
- Home arena: Vostok Stadium
- Website: vostok-ars.jimdo.com

Vostok (Russian: Восток) is a bandy club in Arsenyev, Russia. The club was founded in 1953, has earlier been playing in the Russian Bandy Super League, the top-tier of Russian bandy, and now plays in Russian Bandy Supreme League. The home games are played at Stadium Vostok. The club colours are red and blue.
