= Russian Supreme League =

Russian Supreme League may refer to

- Russian Bandy Supreme League
- Supreme Hockey League
