= Kuzbass Kemerovo =

Kuzbass Kemerovo may refer to the following teams based or formerly based in Kemerovo, Russia:

- FC Kuzbass Kemerovo, an association football club
- Kuzbass Kemerovo Bandy Club, a bandy club
- VC Kuzbass Kemerovo, a volleyball club
- Kuzbass Kemerovo (speedway), a speedway club
