= European Cup (bandy) =

International club team bandy tournament

- Status: Dormant
- Genre: Sports event
- Date: Winter
- Frequency: Annually
- Inaugurated: 1974
- Participants: Bandy club teams
- Organiser: FIB

The European Cup was an annual bandy club competition between teams from Europe. The first edition of the tournament was held in 1974. The most recent competition was in 2009, but it has not been formally discontinued.

Clubs qualified for the cup by becoming champions in their own national championship. This meant that only four teams took part, the national championship teams from Finland, Norway, the Soviet Union – eventually replaced by Russia – and Sweden. The tournament was dominated by teams from the Soviet Union/Russia, and Sweden. Teams from those countries won every tournament.

== Editions ==
Season	Winners	Runners-up
1974	(Soviet Union) SKA-Sverdlovsk	(Sweden) Falu BS
1975	(Soviet Union) Dynamo Moscow	(Sweden) Ljusdals BK
1976	(Soviet Union) Dynamo Moscow	(Sweden) Brobergs IF
1977	(Soviet Union) Dynamo Alma-Ata	(Finland) Oulun Luistinseura
1978	(Soviet Union) Dynamo Moscow	(Sweden) Edsbyns IF
1979	(Sweden) IF Boltic	(Soviet Union) Zorky
1980	(Soviet Union) Yenisey	(Sweden) IF Boltic
1981	(Sweden) IF Boltic	(Soviet Union) Yenisey
1982	(Sweden) IF Boltic	(Soviet Union) Yenisey
1983	(Soviet Union) Yenisey	(Sweden) IF Boltic
1984	(Sweden) IF Boltic	(Soviet Union) Yenisey
1985	(Sweden) IF Boltic	(Soviet Union) Yenisey
1986	(Soviet Union) Yenisey	(Sweden) Vetlanda BK
1987	(Soviet Union) Yenisey	(Sweden) IFK Motala
1988	(Soviet Union) Yenisey	(Finland) HIFK
1989	(Soviet Union) Yenisey	(Sweden) Västerås SK
1990	(Sweden) Västerås SK	(Finland) Oulun Luistinseura
1991	(Sweden) Vetlanda BK	(Soviet Union) Yenisey
1992	(Russia) Zorky	(Finland) Botnia-69
1993	(Sweden) Västerås SK	(Finland) Warkauden Pallo -35
1994	(Sweden) Västerås SK	(Russia) SKA-Zenit
1995	(Sweden) IF Boltic	(Russia) Sibselmash
1996	(Sweden) Västerås SK	(Russia) Vodnik
1997	(Sweden) Sandvikens AIK	(Russia) Vodnik
1998	(Sweden) Västerås SK	(Russia) Vodnik
1999	not played	
2000	(Sweden) Sandvikens AIK	(Russia) Vodnik
2001	(Russia) Yenisey	(Sweden) Västerås SK
2002	(Russia) Vodnik	(Sweden) Sandvikens AIK
2003	(Russia) Vodnik	(Sweden) Sandvikens AIK
2004	(Russia) Vodnik	(Sweden) Edsbyns IF
2005	(Sweden) Edsbyns IF	(Russia) Vodnik
2006	(Russia) Dynamo Moscow	(Sweden) Edsbyns IF
2007	(Sweden) Edsbyns IF	(Russia) Dynamo Moscow
2008	(Russia) Dynamo Moscow	(Sweden) Edsbyns IF
2009	(Russia) Dynamo Moscow	(Sweden) Västerås SK

== See also ==
- Bandy World Cup
- FIB Champions Cup
