= Znamya-Udmurtiya =

- City: Votkinsk, Russia
- League: Russian Bandy Supreme League
- Division: Group 2
- Founded: 1931; 95 years ago
- Home arena: Znamya Stadium
- Website: vk.com/znamyaudm

Znamya-Udmurtiya (Russian: Знамя-Удмуртия) is a bandy club in Votkinsk, Russia. The club was founded in 1931 and has earlier played in the Super League, the top-tier of Russian bandy. It is now playing in the second tier Supreme League. The home games are played at Stadium Znamya in Votkinsk. The club colours are white and red, likely inspired by the coat of arms of Udmurtia.

Team picture:

Jersey depiction:
