= Start Stadium =

Start Stadium may refer to:

- Start Stadium (Saransk), stadium in Saransk, Republic of Mordovia, Russia
- Start Stadium (Nizhny Novgorod), stadium in Nizhny Novgorod, Russia
