= Yenisey-2 =

Yenisey-2 may mean

- Yenisey-2, an imaging system used on the Luna 3 space craft
- Yenisey-2, the second team of Yenisey Krasnoyarsk bandy club
