= Nikelshchik =

- City: Verkhny Ufaley, Russia
- League: Russian Bandy Supreme League
- Division: Group 2
- Home arena: Nikelshchik Stadium

Nikelshchik (Russian: Никельщик) is a bandy club in Verkhny Ufaley, Russia. The club is playing in the Russian Bandy Supreme League, the second tier of Russian bandy. The home games are played at Stadium Nikelshchik in Verkhny Ufaley. The club colours are blue and white.

Their spectator numbers stand out. Whereas it's unusual in their division to reach 1 000, they usually have a couple of thousand, for example 2 750 against Dynamo Mayak or 3 500 against SKA-Sverdlovsk. Although located in Chelyabinsk Oblast, the club belongs to the bandy federation of Sverdlovsk Oblast.

The club was founded in 1935.
