= Spartak Moscow (bandy) =

- City: Moscow, Russia
- Founded: 1910
- Folded: 1961

Spartak Moscow (Russian: Спартак Москва) was a Russian bandy club, which was founded in 1910 and changed names a number of times before it got its final name as part of the sport society Spartak. The bandy club was discontinued in 1961. For other departments of this club in Moscow, see Spartak Moscow.

During its active years, Spartak Moscow managed to win the bronze medal in the Soviet bandy championship in 1950, and 1951, and was finalist in the Soviet Cup in 1948. The club also won the Moscow district championship in 1927, 1928, 1942, 1947, 1960 and was the runner-up in 1929.

== Sources ==
- Based on the Russian Wikipedia article, which in turn refers to Соснин В.И., Щеглов М.И., Юрин В.Л. Хоккей с мячом: Энциклопедия. — М: Новые технологии, 2009. — 808 с. — ISBN 978-5-86541-025-6.
