= Dynamo Samara =

- City: Samara, Russia
- Founded: 1942; 84 years ago
- Home arena: Lokomotiv Stadium

Dynamo Samara (Russian: Динамо Самара) is a Russian professional bandy club in Samara, which previously has been playing in the top division Russian Bandy Super League. Until 2012 its name was TsSK VVS. The club was founded in 1942 and the club colours are white and blue.
