= Spartak Moscow =

Spartak Moscow may refer to the following teams based or formerly based in Moscow, Russia:

- FC Spartak Moscow, an association football club
- HC Spartak Moscow, a professional ice hockey team
- Spartak GM Moscow, a semi-professional rugby club
- WBC Spartak Noginsk, a women's basketball team previously known as WBC Spartak Moscow
- Spartak Moscow (bandy club), a bandy club, active 1910–1961
- FC Spartak Moscow (women)

== See also ==
- Spartak (sports society)
