= CSKA Moscow (bandy) =

- City: Moscow, Soviet Union
- Founded: 1936
- Folded: 1962

CSKA (which could be translated as “Central house of Red Army”) Moscow was a Russian bandy club which was a department of CSKA Moscow. It won the Soviet national championship in 1954, 1955 and 1957. The bandy department was established in 1936 and disbanded in 1962.

== Honours ==
=== Domestic ===
- Soviet Champions:
  - Winners (3): 1954, 1955, 1957
  - Runners-up (4): 1956, 1958, 1960, 1962
- Soviet Cup:
  - Winners (3): 1939, 1945, 1946.
