= List of Russian bandy champions =

Russian bandy champion (Russian: Чемпион России по хоккею с мячом) is a title held by the winners of the final of the highest Russian bandy league played each year, currently the Bandy Super League.

The championship is for men's teams. There is also a women's bandy championship.

The Russian championship is seen as a direct continuation of the Soviet Union championship. Many Russian bandy clubs were formed during the Soviet years. Therefore, this list also include the Soviet Union champions until the dissolution of the Soviet Union in 1991.

== History ==
The first national bandy championship in the then Soviet Union was held in 1936 but wasn't resumed for the next 14 years. Starting in 1950, the Soviet Union Bandy Championship became annual and continued to exist up until the 1990-91 season, when mid-season, the Soviet Union was dissolved, so the 1991 champion was instead named Champion of the Commonwealth of Independent States. For the following season, 1991–92, the Russian Bandy League was formed and the champion has since become Russian Champion. The league is ended with a play-off for the Russian Bandy Championship. Starting with the 2011-12 season, the league was rearranged and renamed the Russian Bandy Super League.

Until the 2008-09 season, a bronze game was held, but since then, the third place is shared by the two semi-final losing teams.

== List of winners ==
=== Soviet Union Champions ===
Season	Gold medalists	Silver medalists	Bronze medalists
1936	Dynamo Moscow	Yagoda TK Bolshev	Dynamo Leningrad

Season	Gold medalists	Silver medalists	Bronze medalists
1950	SKA Sverdlovsk	Dynamo Moscow	Spartak Moscow
1951	Dynamo Moscow	SKA Sverdlovsk	Spartak Moscow
1952	Dynamo Moscow	Lenin IVF Leningrad	SKA Sverdlovsk
1953	SKA Sverdlovsk	ODO Riga	Traktor Krasnoyarsk
1954	CDSA Moscow	Dynamo Moscow	Burevestnik Moscow
1955	CDSA Moscow	SKA Sverdlovsk	ODO Khabarovsk
1955–56	SKA Sverdlovsk	CDSA Moscow	Dynamo Moscow
1956–57	CSK MO Moscow	SKA Sverdlovsk	Burevestnik Moscow
1957–58	OSK Sverdlovsk	CSK MO Moscow	Burevestnik Moscow
1958–59	SKVO Sverdlovsk	Dynamo Moscow	CSK MO Moscow
1959–60	SKA Sverdlovsk	CSKA Moscow	Dynamo Moscow
1960–61	Dynamo Moscow	SKA Sverdlovsk	CSK MO Moscow
1961–62	SKA Sverdlovsk	CSK MO Moscow	Dynamo Moscow
1962–63	Dynamo Moscow	SKA Sverdlovsk	Vympel Kaliningrad
1963–64	Dynamo Moscow	SKA Khabarovsk	SKA Sverdlovsk
1964–65	Dynamo Moscow	SKA Sverdlovsk	SKA Khabarovsk
1965–66	SKA Sverdlovsk	Dynamo Moscow	Dynamo Alma-Ata
1966–67	Dynamo Moscow	SKA Sverdlovsk	Dynamo Alma-Ata
1967–68	SKA Sverdlovsk	Dynamo Moscow	SKA Khabarovsk
1968–69	Dynamo Moscow	SKA Sverdlovsk	SKA Khabarovsk
1969–70	Dynamo Moscow	SKA Khabarovsk	SKA Sverdlovsk
1970–71	SKA Sverdlovsk	Dynamo Moscow	Dynamo Alma-Ata
1971–72	Dynamo Moscow	Volga Ulyanovsk	SKA Khabarovsk
1972–73	Dynamo Moscow	Dynamo Alma-Ata	Kuzbass Kemerovo
1973–74	SKA Sverdlovsk	Dynamo Moscow	Dynamo Alma-Ata
1974–75	Dynamo Moscow	Dynamo Alma-Ata	SKA Sverdlovsk
1975–76	Dynamo Moscow	Dynamo Alma-Ata	Volga Ulyanovsk
1976–77	Dynamo Alma-Ata	Dynamo Moscow	Volga Ulyanovsk
1977–78	Dynamo Moscow	Dynamo Alma-Ata	Yenisey Krasnoyarsk
1978–79	Zorky Krasnogorsk	Dynamo Alma-Ata	SKA Khabarovsk
1979–80	Yenisey Krasnoyarsk	Start Gorky	Zorky Krasnogorsk
1980–81	Yenisey Krasnoyarsk	Dynamo Alma-Ata	SKA Khabarovsk
1981–82	Yenisey Krasnoyarsk	SKA Khabarovsk	Zorky Krasnogorsk
1982–83	Yenisey Krasnoyarsk	Zorky Krasnogorsk	Dynamo Alma-Ata
1983–84	Yenisey Krasnoyarsk	Dynamo Moscow	SKA Khabarovsk
1984–85	Yenisey Krasnoyarsk	Zorky Krasnogorsk	SKA Khabarovsk
1985–86	Yenisey Krasnoyarsk	SKA Khabarovsk	Dynamo Moscow
1986–87	Yenisey Krasnoyarsk	Dynamo Moscow	Zorky Krasnogorsk
1987–88	Yenisey Krasnoyarsk	Dynamo Moscow	SKA Khabarovsk
1988–89	Yenisey Krasnoyarsk	SKA Khabarovsk	Zorky Krasnogorsk
1989–90	Dynamo Alma-Ata	Yenisey Krasnoyarsk	SKA Sverdlovsk
1990–91	Yenisey Krasnoyarsk	Zorky Krasnogorsk	Dynamo Moscow

=== Commonwealth of Independent States Champions ===
Season	Gold medalists	Silver medalists	Bronze medalists
1991–92	Zorky Krasnogorsk	SKA-Zenit Yekaterinburg	Dynamo Alma-Ata

=== Russian Champions ===
Year	Gold medalists	Silver medalists	Bronze medalists
1994	Zorky Krasnogorsk	Stroitel Syktyvkar	Vodnik Arkhangelsk
1994	SKA-Zenit Yekaterinburg	Sibselmash Novosibirsk	Sayany Abakan
1995	Sibselmash Novosibirsk	Start Nizhny Novgorod	Sibskana Irkutsk
1996	Vodnik Arkhangelsk	Sibselmash Novosibirsk	Start Nizhny Novgorod
1997	Vodnik Arkhangelsk	Sibselmash Novosibirsk	Volga Ulyanovsk
1998	Vodnik Arkhangelsk	Sibskana Irkutsk	Start Nizhny Novgorod
1999	Vodnik Arkhangelsk	Yenisey Krasnoyarsk	Sibskana Irkutsk
2000	Vodnik Arkhangelsk	Yenisey Krasnoyarsk	Start Nizhny Novgorod
2001	Yenisey Krasnoyarsk	Vodnik Arkhangelsk	Kuzbass Kemerovo
2002	Vodnik Arkhangelsk	Start Nizhny Novgorod	Kuzbass Kemerovo
2003	Vodnik Arkhangelsk	Yenisey Krasnoyarsk	Kuzbass Kemerovo
2004	Vodnik Arkhangelsk	Kuzbass Kemerovo	Zorky Krasnogorsk
2005	Vodnik Arkhangelsk	Kuzbass Kemerovo	SKA-Neftyanik Khabarovsk
2006	Dynamo Moscow	Kuzbass Kemerovo	Rodina Kirov
2007	Dynamo Moscow	Zorky Krasnogorsk	Kuzbass Kemerovo
2008	Dynamo Moscow	Zorky Krasnogorsk	Kuzbass Kemerovo
2009	Dynamo Moscow	Kuzbass Kemerovo	Dynamo Kazan
2010	Dynamo Moscow	Zorky Krasnogorsk	Kuzbass Kemerovo; Yenisey Krasnoyarsk
2011	Dynamo Kazan	Dynamo Moscow	Zorky Krasnogorsk
2012	Dynamo Moscow	Dynamo Kazan	Yenisey Krasnoyarsk; Zorky Krasnogorsk
2013	Dynamo Moscow	Zorky Krasnogorsk	Dynamo Kazan; Yenisey Krasnoyarsk
2014	Yenisey Krasnoyarsk	Dynamo Moscow	Dynamo Kazan; Zorky Krasnogorsk
2015	Yenisey Krasnoyarsk	Dynamo Moscow	Baykal-Energiya Irkutsk; SKA-Neftyanik Khabarovsk
2016	Yenisey Krasnoyarsk	Baykal-Energiya Irkutsk	Dynamo Moscow; SKA-Neftyanik Khabarovsk
2017	SKA-Neftyanik Khabarovsk	Baykal-Energiya Irkutsk	Yenisey Krasnoyarsk
2018	SKA-Neftyanik Khabarovsk	Yenisey Krasnoyarsk	Baykal-Energiya Irkutsk
2019	SKA-Neftyanik Khabarovsk	Dynamo Moscow	Uralsky Trubnik

== Titles ==
=== Number of titles per club ===
Titles	Club	Years
24	Dynamo Moscow	1936, 1951, 1952, 1961, 1963, 1964, 1965, 1967, 1969, 1970, 1972, 1973, 1975, 1976, 1978, 2006, 2007, 2008, 2009, 2010, 2012, 2013, 2020, 2022
16	Yenisey Krasnoyarsk	1980, 1981, 1982, 1983, 1984, 1985, 1986, 1987, 1988, 1989, 1991, 2001, 2014, 2015, 2016, 2021
12	SKA-Sverdlovsk	1950, 1953, 1956, 1958, 1959, 1960, 1962, 1966, 1968, 1971, 1974, 1994
9	Vodnik Arkhangelsk	1996, 1997, 1998, 1999, 2000, 2002, 2003, 2004, 2005
4	SKA-Neftyanik	2017, 2018, 2019, 2020
3	CDSA/CSK MO Moscow	1954, 1955, 1957
2	Dynamo Alma-Ata	1977, 1990
2	Zorky Krasnogorsk	1979, 1992
1	Sibselmash Novosibirsk	1995
1	Dynamo Kazan	2011
