= Vympel Korolyov =

Vympel
- City: Korolyov, Russia
- Founded: 1934; 92 years ago
- Home arena: Vympel Stadium

KhK Vympel (Russian: ХК «Вымпел» Королёв) is a Russian bandy club based in Korolyov, Moscow Oblast, founded in 1934. The club colours are white, red and blue. In 1963 it won the bronze in the Soviet national championship. Their stadium, called Stadium Vympel, was expecting artificial ice, However, the project was abandoned. Although an indoor ice hockey-sized arena entered the plans instead, the official reason given was financial problems.
