= Bandy World Cup =

International bandy tournament in Sweden

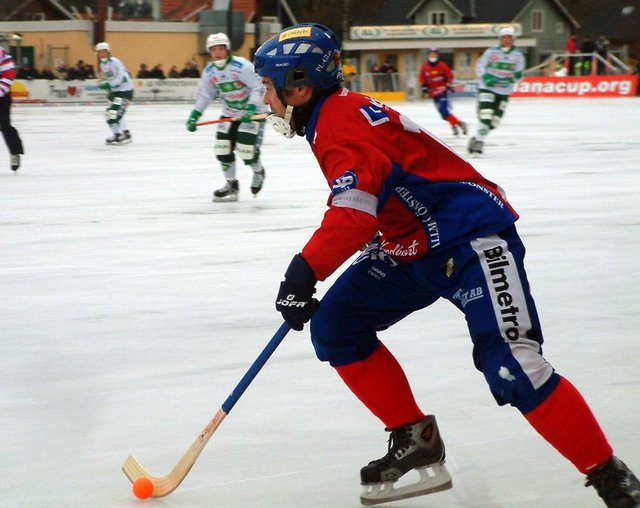
- Magnus Olsson playing for Edsbyns IF in 2005.
- Status: active
- Genre: sporting event
- Date: mid-October
- Frequency: annual
- Locations: Ljusdal, Sweden (1974–2008); Sandviken, Sweden (2009–)
- Country: Sweden
- Inaugurated: 1974

The Bandy World Cup is an international bandy competition played in Sweden at the beginning of the bandy season every year, in autumn. The participating teams qualify based on their results in the previous bandy season.

The World Cup is not played by national teams but is for bandy clubs from around the world, and should therefore not be confused with the Bandy World Championship. It is usually considered to be "the world championship for clubs". The tournament has been dominated by the Swedish and Russian teams.

== History ==
The Bandy World Cup was held every year in Ljusdal in Sweden from 1974 to 2008, at the start of the bandy season in autumn. From 2009 it has been played indoors in Sandviken because Ljusdal was waiting for an indoor arena. The outdoor ices were too unpredictable because of the weather this time of the year, so for the 2009 cup the Federation of International Bandy demanded the cup should be played indoors. It was first decided to move the cup temporarily to Sandviken for two years, but when Ljusdal still had no indoor arena, a contract was made between FIB and Sandviken to host the cup in Sandviken up to and including 2013. It was agreed that if there was an indoor arena in Ljusdal in 2014, Ljusdal may apply to host the cup again.

The tournament was first held in 1974 and has been called the World Cup since 1980. The full name of the cup has changed over the years, partly because of different sponsors. The first two years it was called DAF-cupen, then Dex-cupen 1976–1979 and Dex World Cup 1980–1983. 1984–1985 it was simply called World Cup Ljusdal. 1986 SJ became sponsors, so it was SJ World Cup 1986–1998. Then Ljusdal World Cup until 2001 and since 2002 it has been known as the Bandy World Cup, in 2005 additionally as Polar Bandy World Cup, since 2006 as ExTe World Cup Bandy.

There is also a Bandy World Cup Women for women's teams.

== World Cup winners and runners-up ==
Year:	Winners: (With country and hometown)	Runners-up: (With country and hometown)	Result:
1974	Sandvikens AIK (Sweden) Sandviken	Brobergs IF (Sweden) Söderhamn	4–2 (additional time and Penalty shootout)
1975	Brobergs IF (Sweden) Söderhamn	Sandvikens AIK (Sweden) Sandviken	3–2
1976	Oulun Luistinseura (Finland) Oulu	Västerås SK (Sweden) Västerås	3–2
1977	Brobergs IF (Sweden) Söderhamn	IK Sirius (Sweden) Uppsala	6–1
1978	Brobergs IF (Sweden) Söderhamn	Ljusdals BK (Sweden) Ljusdal	4–1
1979	Edsbyns IF (Sweden) Edsbyn	Örebro SK (Sweden) Örebro	5–4
1980	IF Boltic (Sweden) Karlstad	Edsbyns IF (Sweden) Edsbyn	5–4
1981	IF Boltic (Sweden) Karlstad	Broberg/Söderhamn Bandy (Sweden) Söderhamn	6–0
1982	Yenisey (Soviet Union) Krasnoyarsk	IF Boltic (Sweden) Karlstad	2–1 (sudden death)
1983	Brobergs IF (Sweden) Söderhamn	Yenisey (Soviet Union) Krasnoyarsk	4–0
1984	Yenisey (Soviet Union) Krasnoyarsk	Ljusdals BK (Sweden) Ljusdal	5–4
1985	IF Boltic (Sweden) Karlstad	Yenisey (Soviet Union) Krasnoyarsk	2–1
1986	IF Boltic (Sweden) Karlstad	Vetlanda BK (Sweden) Vetlanda	2–1
1987	Västerås SK (Sweden) Västerås	Dynamo Moscow (Soviet Union) Moscow	3–0
1988	Vetlanda BK (Sweden) Vetlanda	Selånger SK (Sweden) Sundsvall	3–1
1989	Västerås SK (Sweden) Västerås	Sandvikens AIK (Sweden) Sandviken	3–0
1990	Zorky (Soviet Union) Krasnogorsk	Vetlanda BK (Sweden) Vetlanda	5–2
1991	Edsbyns IF (Sweden) Edsbyn	Sandvikens AIK (Sweden) Sandviken	6–3
1992	IK Sirius (Sweden) Uppsala	Sandvikens AIK (Sweden) Sandviken	7–0
1993	Vetlanda BK (Sweden) Vetlanda	Ljusdals BK (Sweden) Ljusdal	4–2
1994	Västerås SK (Sweden) Västerås	Sandvikens AIK (Sweden) Sandviken	5–2
1995	IF Boltic (Sweden) Karlstad	Västerås SK (Sweden) Västerås	2–1 (sudden death)
1996	IF Boltic (Sweden) Karlstad	Falu BS (Sweden) Falun	6–3
1997	Västerås SK (Sweden) Västerås	Ljusdals BK (Sweden) Ljusdal	4–1
1998	Falu BS (Sweden) Falun	Västerås SK (Sweden) Västerås	2–1
1999	Hammarby IF (Sweden) Stockholm	Ljusdals BK (Sweden) Ljusdal	7–0
2000	Västerås SK (Sweden) Västerås	Yenisey (Russia) Krasnoyarsk	2–1
2001	Hammarby IF (Sweden) Stockholm	Sandvikens AIK (Sweden) Sandviken	2–1
2002	Sandvikens AIK (Sweden) Sandviken	Vodnik (Russia) Arkhangelsk	3–2
2003	Vodnik (Russia) Arkhangelsk	Sandvikens AIK (Sweden) Sandviken	4–3
2004	Vodnik (Russia) Arkhangelsk	Sandvikens AIK (Sweden) Sandviken	8–5
2005	Bollnäs GIF (Sweden) Bollnäs	Edsbyns IF (Sweden) Edsbyn	3–2 (sudden death)
2006	Dynamo Moscow (Russia) Moscow	Zorky (Russia) Krasnogorsk	7–6 (sudden death)
2007	Dynamo Moscow (Russia) Moscow	Edsbyns IF (Sweden) Edsbyn	5–0
2008	Edsbyns IF (Sweden) Edsbyn	Bollnäs GIF (Sweden) Bollnäs	3–2
2009	Hammarby IF (Sweden) Stockholm	Zorky (Russia) Krasnogorsk	6–2
2010	Dynamo Kazan (Russia) Kazan	Hammarby IF (Sweden) Stockholm	3–1
2011	Yenisey (Russia) Krasnoyarsk	Sandvikens AIK (Sweden) Sandviken	4–3
2012	Zorky (Russia) Krasnogorsk	Yenisey (Russia) Krasnoyarsk	3–0
2013	Dynamo Moscow (Russia) Moscow	Dynamo Kazan (Russia) Kazan	3–0
2014	Västerås SK (Sweden) Västerås	IFK Vänersborg (Sweden) Vänersborg	4–1
2015	Yenisey (Russia) Krasnoyarsk	Sandvikens AIK (Sweden) Sandviken	5–0
2016	Västerås SK (Sweden) Västerås	Villa Lidköping BK (Sweden) Lidköping	4–1
2017	Sandvikens AIK (Sweden) Sandviken	Yenisey (Russia) Krasnoyarsk	4–3
2018	Villa Lidköping BK (Sweden) Lidköping	Sandvikens AIK (Sweden) Sandviken	4–1
2019	Bollnäs GIF (Sweden) Bollnäs	SKA-Neftyanik (Russia) Khabarovsk	5–2
2020	Cancelled due to the COVID-19 pandemic
2021	Cancelled due to the COVID-19 pandemic
