= Dynamo Alma-Ata (bandy) =

- City: Almaty, Kazakhstan
- Founded: 1932
- Folded: 1995

Dynamo Alma-Ata (Russian: Динамо Алма-Ата) was the bandy department of the sports club Dynamo Alma-Ata in Alma-Ata (now Almaty) in Kazakhstan at the time of the Soviet Union. The club was established in 1932 and disbanded in 1995, just some years after Kazakhstan became independent.

In 1977 and in 1990, the club became Soviet national champions in bandy. The club also won the silver in 1973, 1975, 1976, 1978, 1979, 1981 and the bronze in 1966, 1967, 1971, 1974, and 1983.

In 1978, the club won the European Cup, beating Edsbyns IF in the final.

== Honours ==
=== International ===
- European Cup:
  - Winners (1): 1978
