= CSKA Moscow =

Sports club based in Moscow, Russia

- Full name: Central Army Sports Club Moscow; Russian: Центральный спортивный клуб Армии
- Founded: 1923; 103 years ago
- Based in: Moscow, Russia
- Colors
- President: Colonel Artyom Gromov (nachalnik)
- Website: cska.ru

CSKA Moscow (Russian: ЦСКА Москва) is a Russian multi-sports club based in Moscow. It is a federal autonomous institution of the Ministry of Defence (Russian: Федеральное автономное учреждение Министерства обороны Российской Федерации «Центральный спортивный клуб Армии»). CSKA Moscow is part of the wider Ministry of Defence sports committee that includes military clubs in other cities of the Russian Federation. While not on the official list of the Russian Olympic Committee members, CSKA Moscow fielded many athletes in world-class competitions, including the Olympics.

The club was created in 1923 as part of the Vsevobuch, based on the OLLS, the Skiing Society, which was founded in 1901. Later, during the Soviet era, it was the central part of the Armed Forces sports society, which in turn was associated with the Soviet Army; because of this, it was popularly referred to in the West as "Red Army" or "the Red Army team". The historical CSKA sports club (a.k.a. "Big CSKA") is still a department of the Russian Defense Ministry.

Following the 2023 publication of the International Olympic Committee's criteria for the reinstatement of Russian athletes (they were suspended in February 2022 due to the Russian invasion of Ukraine), athletes affiliated with CSKA Moscow were officially prohibited from attending the Olympic Games until at least 2026.

== Composition ==
The "Big CSKA" had several teams in many sports, but those which are still operating are all now private clubs:

| Sport | Teams |
|---|---|
| Football | PFC CSKA Moscow formed in 1911. |
| Football | WFC CSKA Moscow formed in 2016. |
| Ice hockey | HC CSKA Moscow formed in 1946. |
| Basketball | PBC CSKA Moscow formed in 1923. |
| Basketball | WBC CSKA Moscow formed in 1923, disbanded in 2009. |
| Volleyball | VC CSKA Moscow formed in 1946, disbanded in 2009. |
| Volleyball | WVC CSKA Moscow formed in 1936, disbanded in 2008. |
| Water Polo | CSK VMF Moscow formed in 1924. |
| Futsal | MFK CSKA Moscow formed in 1996. |
| Handball | HBC CSKA Moscow formed in 1973, disbanded in 2001, re-launched in 2020. |
| Handball | HBC CSKA Moscow (women) formed in 2019. |
| Rugby | RC CSKA Moscow formed in 2014. |
| Rugby | WRC CSKA Moscow formed in 2014. |
| Bandy | CSKA Moscow formed in 1923, disbanded in 1962. |
| Beach soccer | BSC CSKA Moscow formed in 2010. |
| Sport wrestling | CSKA Wrestling Club formed in 1997. |
| eSports | PFO CSKA Moscow formed in 2024. |

The CSKA has also been home to many figure skaters, including Adelina Sotnikova, Ekaterina Gordeeva and Sergei Grinkov. Elena Mukhina, the 1978 World Champion artistic gymnast, Aliya Mustafina and Yevgeniya Kanayeva, Olympic gold medalists in gymnastics, Sofya Velikaya, a sabre fencer, Olympic champions Elena Vesnina, and Viktor An.

== Brief overview ==
The club was created by decree of the Vsevobuch chief K. Mekhonoshin No. 160/R of 14 April 1923. It was prescribed to establish the "Vsevobuch experimental and exhibition military sports ground" (abbreviated as OPPV). Also, the mentioned decree transferred under direct administration of the Vsevobuch Central Directorate the ground and a ski station of the Ski sports enthusiasts society (OLLS). The ground and the ski station both were located at the Sokolniki Park in Moscow. As a means of soldiers' physical training, practice, organizational activities, sports programs, and methods of Vsevobuch, the military sports ground was created for practical research for various sports, gymnastics, active games, and in the matter of physical training of the Red Army, pre-conscription youth, and the military-aged population.

On April 29, 1923, the OPPV teams officially appeared in competitions. That day, the OPPV football team, which was formed based on the OLLS football team, played its first game in the Moscow city championship. In February 1928, the club was included in the newly established Frunze Central House of Red Army (CDKA) as a department of physical culture and sports. In October 1953 all sports centers of CDKA and Air Force of the Moscow Military District were included in the Central Sports Club of Ministry of Defense (CSK MO), which in April 1960 it was renamed into its more common title - the Central Sports Club of the Armed Forces (CSKA), which the Moscow branch belonged as the flagship and most elite of all the clubs within the Soviet Armed Forces.

The club is active in more than 40 sports, and produced 463 Olympic champions for the Soviet Union and Russia, 11,000 champions in local Soviet and Russian championships, and 2629 golden medalists in European and world championships.

The first Olympian who represented CSKA at the Summer Olympics and was awarded the gold medal in 1952 is a disc thrower Nina Ponomaryova (Romashkova), while in winter sports, a speed skater Yevgeny Grishin was the first one who was awarded the gold medal at the 1956 Winter Olympics. Following the death of Ponomaryova in 2016, CSKA announced that it would commemorate its track and field sports school in her name.

In 1973 the CSKA sports society was awarded the Order of Lenin.

== Chiefs and presidents ==
| Period | Chef / President |
|---|---|
| 1923–1924 | (Russian Soviet Federative Socialist Republic) Rebrik D. M. |
| 1924–1938 | (Soviet Union) Vernikovsky B. A. |
| 1939–1940 | (Soviet Union) Sretensky E. S. |
| 1943–1947 | (Soviet Union) Vasiljev D. M. |
| 1948–1949 | (Soviet Union) Andreev V. A. |
| 1950–1952 | (Soviet Union) Halkiopov P. V. |
| 1952–1953 | (Soviet Union) Somov M. M. |
| 1953–1956 | (Soviet Union) Sysoev V. D. |
| 1956–1961 | (Soviet Union) Novgorodov |
| 1962–1969 | (Soviet Union) Schitov N. P. |
| 1969–1970 | (Soviet Union) Chanyshev A. H. |
| 1970–1976 | (Soviet Union) Tabunov I. D. |
| 1976–1982 | (Soviet Union) Pokusaev I. K. |
| 1983–1987 | (Soviet Union) Bludov Y. M. |
| 1987–1989 | (Soviet Union) Zaharov V. A. |
| 1989–1992 | (Soviet Union) Akentjev A. V. |
| 1992–1994 | (Russia) Lagovsky S.M. |
| 1994–1998 | (Russia) Baranovsky A. |
| 1998–2002 | (Russia) Mamiashvili M. |
| 2002 | (Russia) Nino N. |
| 2002–2006 | (Russia) Smorodskaya O. |
| 2006–2009 | (Russia) Kuschenko S. |
| 2009 | (Russia) Pak A. |
| 2009–2012 | (Russia) Shlyachtin D. |
| | (Russia) Ovsyannikov Y. |
| | (Russia) Lukashov V. |
| 2014–2017 | (Russia) Baryshev M. |
| 2017–present | (Russia) Gromov A. |
