= SKA-Sverdlovsk =

Russian professional bandy club

- City: Yekaterinburg, Russia
- League: Russian Bandy Supreme League
- Division: Group 2
- Founded: 1935; 90 years ago
- Home arena: Uralsky Trubnik Stadium
Home colours	Away colours

SKA-Sverdlovsk (Russian: СКА-Свердло́вск) is a professional bandy club from Yekaterinburg, Russia, established in 1935 as part of the Sports Club of the Army (SKA). SKA-Sverdlovsk has historically been a very successful club having won the European Cup in 1974 and the national championship several times.

Team picture:

== Honours ==
=== Domestic ===
- Russian Champions:
  - Winners (12): 1950, 1953, 1956, 1958, 1959, 1960, 1962, 1966, 1968, 1971, 1974, 1994

=== International ===
- European Cup:
  - Winners (1): 1974

== Notable players ==
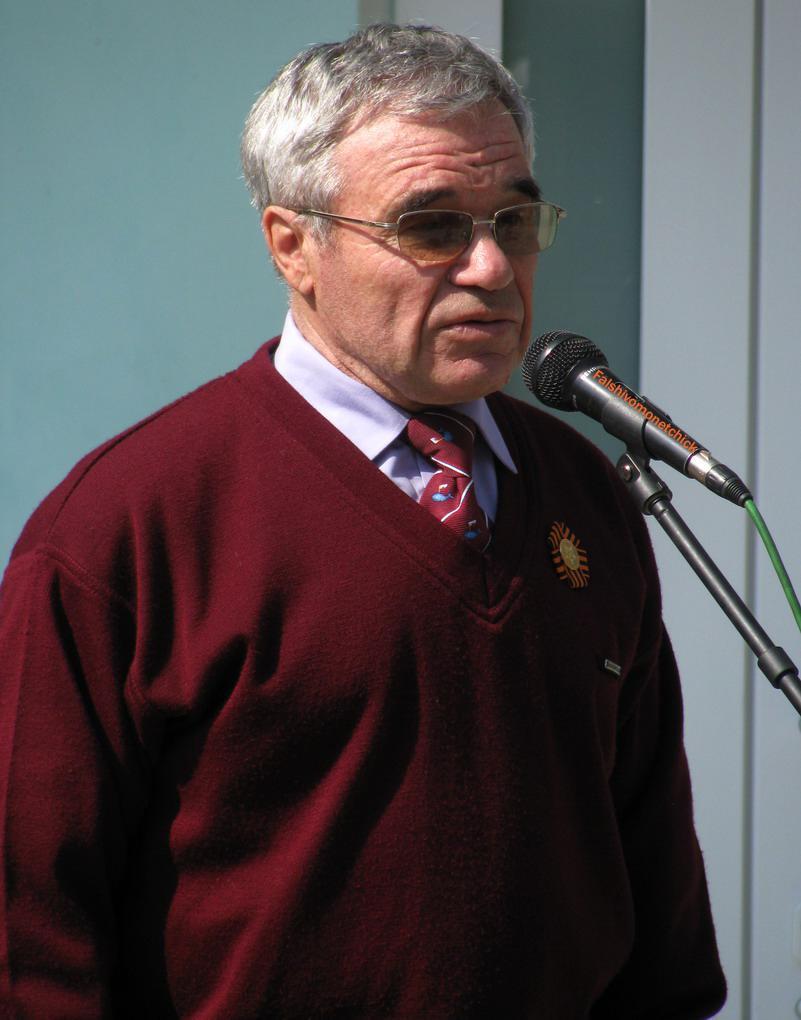
Nikolay Durakov

- Nikolay Durakov — Seven-time world champion bandy.
