= Russian Cup (bandy) =

Russian bandy competition

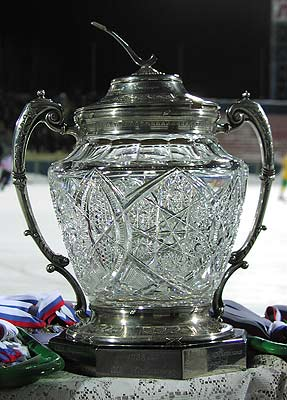
The Russian Cup trophy.

The Russian Cup (Russian: Кубок России) is a cup competition for Russian bandy teams, held almost every year since 1937. The cup is now administered by the Russian Bandy Federation. The cup is contested by the current teams of the Russian Bandy Super League and is generally held between August & September.

The participating clubs are split into two divisions, east and west, and play every other team in that division in the round robin. The top four teams from each division move on to the knockout stage.

The most recent champion is SKA-Neftyanik, who defeated Dynamo Moscow 7:5 at home at the Arena Yerofey. SKA's Alan Djusoyev was named man of the match in the finale, and Tuomas Määttä got named player of the tournament.

== Champions ==
- 1937 - Dynamo Moscow
- 1938 - Dynamo Moscow
- 1939 - CSKA Moscow
- 1940 - Dynamo Moscow
- 1941 - Dynamo Moscow
- 1945 - CSKA Moscow
- 1946 - CSKA Moscow
- 1947 - Dynamo Moscow
- 1948 - Dynamo Moscow
- 1949 - Dynamo Moscow
- 1950 - Dynamo Moscow
- 1951 - Dynamo Moscow
- 1952 - Dynamo Moscow
- 1953 - Dynamo Moscow
- 1954 - Dynamo Moscow
- 1983 - Start
- 1984 - Yenisei Krasnoyarsk
- 1985 - Zorky
- 1986 - Zorky
- 1987 - Dynamo Moscow
- 1988 - SKA Neftianik
- 1989 - Zorky
- 1990 - Zorky
- 1991 - Zorky
- 1992 - Vodnik
- 1993 - Zorky
- 1994 - Vodnik
- 1995 - Vodnik
- 1996 - Vodnik
- 1997 - Yenisei Krasnoyarsk
- 1998 - Yenisei Krasnoyarsk
- 1999 - Yenisei Krasnoyarsk
- 2000 - Vodnik
- 2001 - Kuzbass
- 2002 - SKA Neftianik
- 2003 - Kuzbass
- 2004 - SKA Neftianik
- 2005 - Vodnik/Dynamo Moscow
- 2006 - Dynamo Moscow
- 2007 - Kuzbass
- 2008 - Dynamo Moscow
- 2009 - Dynamo Kazan
- 2010 - Dynamo Moscow
- 2011 - Dynamo Moscow
- 2012 - Dynamo Moscow
- 2013 - Dynamo Kazan
- 2014 - SKA Neftianik
- 2015 - Baykal Energiya
- 2016 - SKA Neftianik
- 2017 - SKA Neftianik
- 2018 - SKA Neftianik
- 2019 - Dynamo Moscow
- 2020 - Dynamo Moscow
- 2021 - Dynamo Moscow
- 2022 - SKA Neftianik
- 2023 - Kuzbass
- 2024 - Kuzbass
- 2025 - Dynamo Moscow
- 2026 - SKA Neftyanik

Club	Russian/Soviet Cups	Most Recent
Dynamo Moscow	21	2025
SKA Neftianik	9	2026
Vodnik Archangelsk	6	2000
Zorky Krasnogorsk	6	1993
Kuzbass Kemerovo	5	2024
CSKA Moscow	3	1946
Dynamo Kazan	2	2013
Baykal Energiya	1	2015
Start Nizhy Novgorod	1	1983
