= Master of Sports of Russia =

Title in the Russian Federation

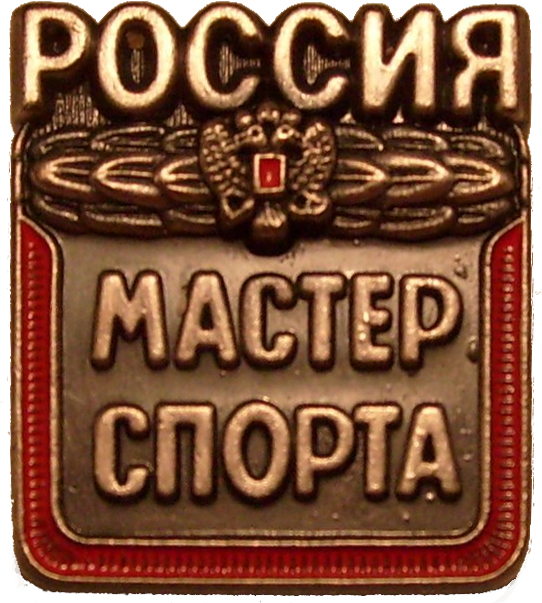
Badge of Master of Sports of Russia

Master of Sports of Russia (MS) (Russian: Мастер спорта России (МС)) is an official sports title in the Russian Federation, according to the Unified Sports Classification System of Russia. It is a direct successor to the similar Soviet classification system. The higher‑level title is Master of Sport of Russia, International Class, while the lower rank is Candidate Master of Sports of Russia (Кандидат в мастера спорта России).

To be awarded the MS title, an athlete must participate in competitions judged by at least three judges of All‑Russian and international category, and must either achieve the required scores or place among a specified set of competitors. The Ministry of Sports of Russia awards the title to outstanding athletes by a special order.
