= Vodnik Arkhangelsk =

Vodnik
- City: Arkhangelsk, Russia
- League: Russian Bandy Super League
- Founded: 1925; 101 years ago
- Home arena: Trud Stadium
Home colours	Away colours

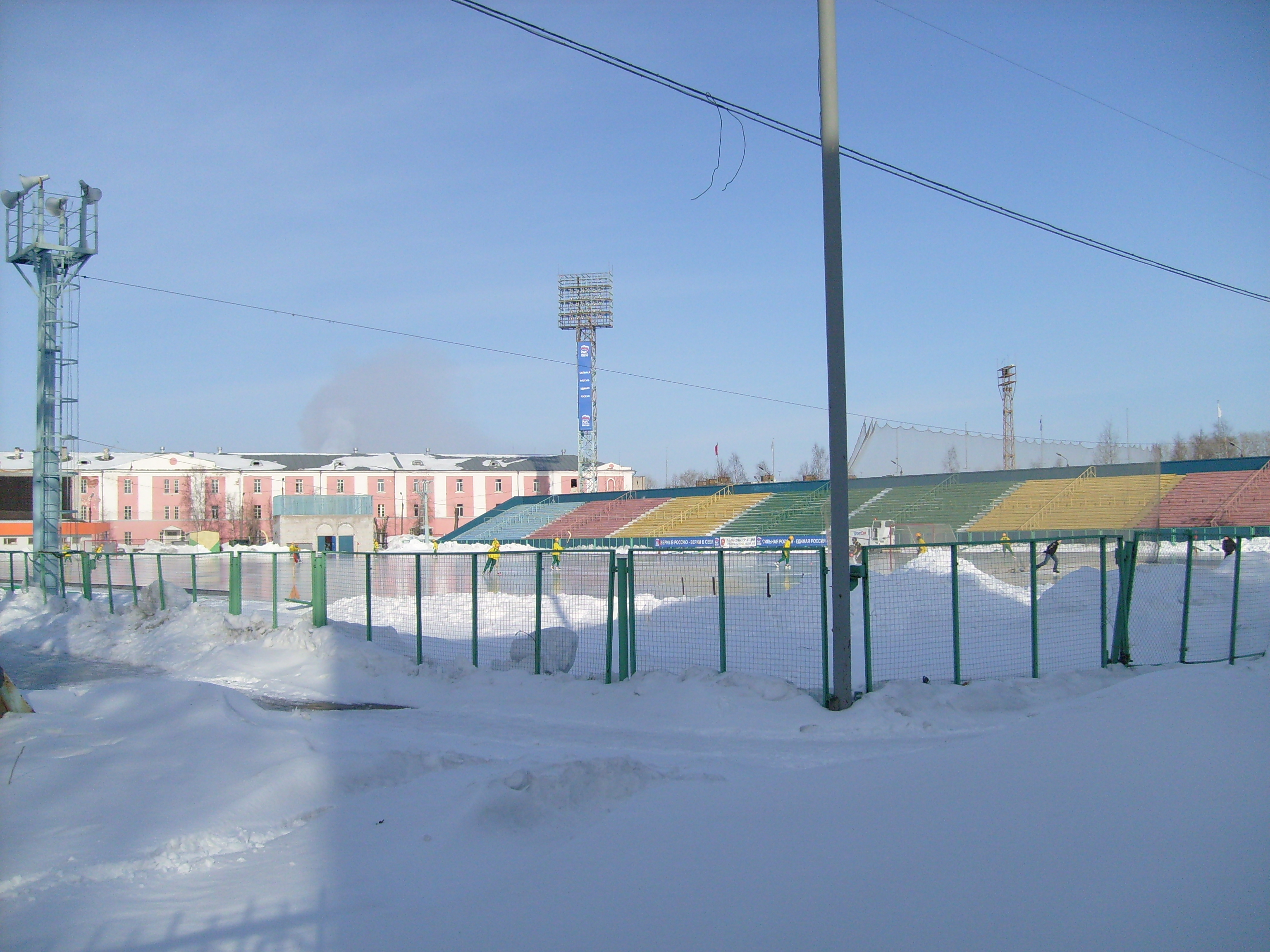
Vodnik plays at Trud

Vodnik (Russian: Водник) is a bandy club from Arkhangelsk in Russia. Vodnik was founded in 1925. During the existence of the Soviet Union the club was a part of the Voluntary Sports Societies of the USSR Vodnik.

== History ==
Vodnik became Russian champions in 1996 to begin a run of nine national championships in ten seasons, missing out only in the 2000–01 season when Yenisey scored the winning goal against them in the last minute. In the 2002 Bandy World Cup, Vodnik were the runners-up after the Swedish club Sandvikens AIK, but won the tournament in 2003 and 2004. The team also won the European Cup in 2002, 2003 and 2004. Since their golden age, Vodnik have made many finals, both league and cup, but have constantly come up just short. For the 2005–06 season, almost all players left for Dynamo Moscow. In the last game of the regular 2016–17 Russian Bandy Super League season, Vodnik played against Baykal-Energiya. The loss would make Vodnik face a weaker team in the playoffs, therefore they started scoring own goals. Baykal-Energiya joined and Vodnik won 11–9. The Russian Bandy Federation banned coach Igor Gapanovich of Vodnik Arkhangelsk and coach Evgeny Erakhtin of Baykal-Energiya each for 30 months. Clubs were fined by 300,000 rubles.

Vodnik lost the 2019 Russian Cup final to Dynamo Moscow 4–2. In the 2019–20 season, the final and 3rd place games, were cancelled. The next seasons semi-finals Vodnik lost to Dynamo. Dynamo and Vodnik met in the final of the Russian Cup, with the Moscovites winning 7–5. In 2022, Vodnik finished the regular season in 2nd, behind Dynamo. They defeated Kazan and Kuzbass to make it to the final against Moscow, but fell 5–2. Finishing 2023 in 3rd place, Vodnik advanced to the semi-finals, but were defeated by Kuzbass 2–1. They finished the playoffs in 3rd after besting Dynamo 6–4. Vodnik made the final in 2024, losing in a tight, high scoring game 7–6 to familiar foe Kuzbass. The two met in the final of the Russian Cup, with Vodnik again being defeated 5–2. For a second year in a row, Kuzbass and Vodnik faced each other in the final, with Kuzbass blowing out their opponent 10–2.

== Honours ==
=== Domestic ===
- Russian Champions:
  - Winners (9): 1996, 1997, 1998, 1999, 2000, 2002, 2003, 2004, 2005

==== Cup ====
- Russian Bandy Cup:
  - Winners (6): 1992, 1994, 1995, 1996, 2000, 2005

=== International ===
- World Cup:
  - Winners (2): 2003, 2004
  - Runners-up (1): 2002
- European Cup:
  - Winners (3): 2002, 2003, 2004
- Champions Cup:
  - Winners (1): 2004

== Vodnik-2 ==
Vodnik's second team Vodnik-2 plays in the Russian Bandy Supreme League, the second tier of Russian bandy.
