= Russian Bandy Super League =

Winter sport league

Russian Super League
- Current season, competition or edition: Super League 2026–27
- Sport: Bandy
- Founded: 1992; 34 years ago
- Organizing body: Russian Ministry of Sport
- No. of teams: 12
- Country: Russia
- Most recent champion: Dynamo Moscow (10) (2025–26)
- Most titles: Dynamo Moscow (10 titles)
- Relegation to: Supreme League
- Domestic cups: Russian Cup (& Super Cup)
- Website: rusbandy.ru

The Russian Bandy Super League (Russian: Чемпионат России по хоккею с мячом — Суперлига, romanized: Chempionat Rossii po khokkeyu s myachom — Superliga) is a men's professional bandy league in Russia, the top division of Russian bandy. 12 teams competed in the 2025–26 season.

There is no definite rule which teams will be relegated or promoted. Besides results on the ice, financial resources and infrastructure also play a part in the decisions. For example, the 2016–17 Russian Bandy Super League contained twelve teams. The 2017–18 season was to have fourteen. Stroitel won the Supreme League final tournament in 2017 and got promoted, while Zorky finished third in its group and did not even qualify for the final tournament. Still Zorky also got promoted. The Russian Bandy Federation banned coach Igor Gapanovich of Vodnik Arkhangelsk and coach Evgeny Erakhtin of Baykal-Energiya each for 30 months in March 2017, and fined each club 300,000 rubles (£4,100/$5,100/€4,800) for the teams scoring an aggregate of 20 goals in their own nets rather than their opponent's to ensure they played against a convenient team in upcoming play-offs.

The Russian Bandy League was established in 1992 and has been reorganized as the Bandy Super League since the 2011–12 season. The regular league is followed by a play-off, where the final decides which team will become the Russian bandy champion. The most recent champions are Dynamo Moscow, who beat SKA Neftyanik 8-6 to win their 10th Super League title.

== Season structure ==
The Russian Cup is played between the months of August and September and is split into East & Western conferences consisting of 7 teams each. The top 4 teams from each conference go through to the Play-offs, which are all single elimination through the quarter-finals, semi-finals and final.

The Super Cup is hosted before the regular season begins, typically in October.

The regular season comprises twelve teams. The first eight teams qualify for the second round, which is played as the best of 3 rounds with quarter-finals and semi-finals and a single elimination final. The final is played on neutral ice. The final winner becomes Russian Champion.

The regular season consists of 22 games and runs from November to February, with the finals taking place in March.

== Current teams ==
The teams playing in the Russian Super League for the 2026–27 season are the following:

| Team | Location | Stadium | Capacity |
|---|---|---|---|
| Dynamo Moscow | Moscow | Ice Palace Krylatskoye | 8,000 |
| Ak Bars-Raketa | Kazan | Raketa Stadium | 7,500 |
| Kuzbass | Kemerovo | Khimik Stadium | 17,000 |
| Rodina | Kirov | Rodina Stadium | 7,500 |
| Baikalskiye Sokoly | Irkutsk | Ice Palace Baikal | 7,000 |
| Sibselmash | Novosibirsk | Sibselmash Stadium | 8,000 |
| SKA-Neftyanik | Khabarovsk | Arena Yerofey | 10,000 |
| Sayany-Khakassia | Abakan | Sayany Stadium | 21,000 |
| Uralsky Trubnik | Pervouralsk | Uralskiy Trubnik Stadium | 6,000 |
| Vodnik | Arkhangelsk | Trud Stadium | 10,000 |
| Volga | Ulyanovsk | Volga-Sport-Arena | 5,000 |
| Yenisey | Krasnoyarsk | Yenisey Stadium | 5,000 |

== Champions by season ==
- 1992 – Zorky (Krasnogorsk)
- 1993 – Zorky (Krasnogorsk)
- 1994 – SKA-Sverdlovsk (Yekaterinburg)
- 1995 – Sibselmash (Novosibirsk)
- 1996 – Vodnik (Arkhangelsk)
- 1997 – Vodnik (Arkhangelsk)
- 1998 – Vodnik (Arkhangelsk)
- 1999 – Vodnik (Arkhangelsk)
- 2000 – Vodnik (Arkhangelsk)
- 2001 – Yenisey (Krasnoyarsk)
- 2002 – Vodnik (Arkhangelsk)
- 2003 – Vodnik (Arkhangelsk)
- 2004 – Vodnik (Arkhangelsk)
- 2005 – Vodnik (Arkhangelsk)
- 2006 – Dynamo (Moscow)
- 2007 – Dynamo (Moscow)
- 2008 – Dynamo (Moscow)
- 2009 – Dynamo (Moscow)
- 2010 – Dynamo (Moscow)
- 2011 – Dynamo-Kazan
- 2012 – Dynamo (Moscow)
- 2013 – Dynamo (Moscow)
- 2014 – Yenisey (Krasnoyarsk)
- 2015 – Yenisey (Krasnoyarsk)
- 2016 – Yenisey (Krasnoyarsk)
- 2017 – SKA-Neftyanik (Khabarovsk)
- 2018 – SKA-Neftyanik (Khabarovsk)
- 2019 – SKA-Neftyanik (Khabarovsk)
- 2020 – Dynamo (Moscow) / SKA-Neftyanik (Khabarovsk)
- 2021 – Yenisey (Krasnoyarsk)
- 2022 – Dynamo (Moscow)
- 2023 – SKA-Neftyanik (Khabarovsk)
- 2024 – Kuzbass (Kemerovo)
- 2025 – Kuzbass (Kemerovo)
- 2026 - Dynamo (Moscow)
