= SKA-Neftyanik =

- Nickname: Armeitsy (The Army Men) Kabany (The Boars)
- City: Khabarovsk, Russia
- League: Russian Bandy Super League
- Founded: 1947; 79 years ago
- Home arena: Arena Yerofey (capacity: 10 000)
- Head coach: Alexey Vladimirovich Zherebkov
- Website: https://skabandy.ru/
Home colours	Away colours

Championships
- League champions: 5

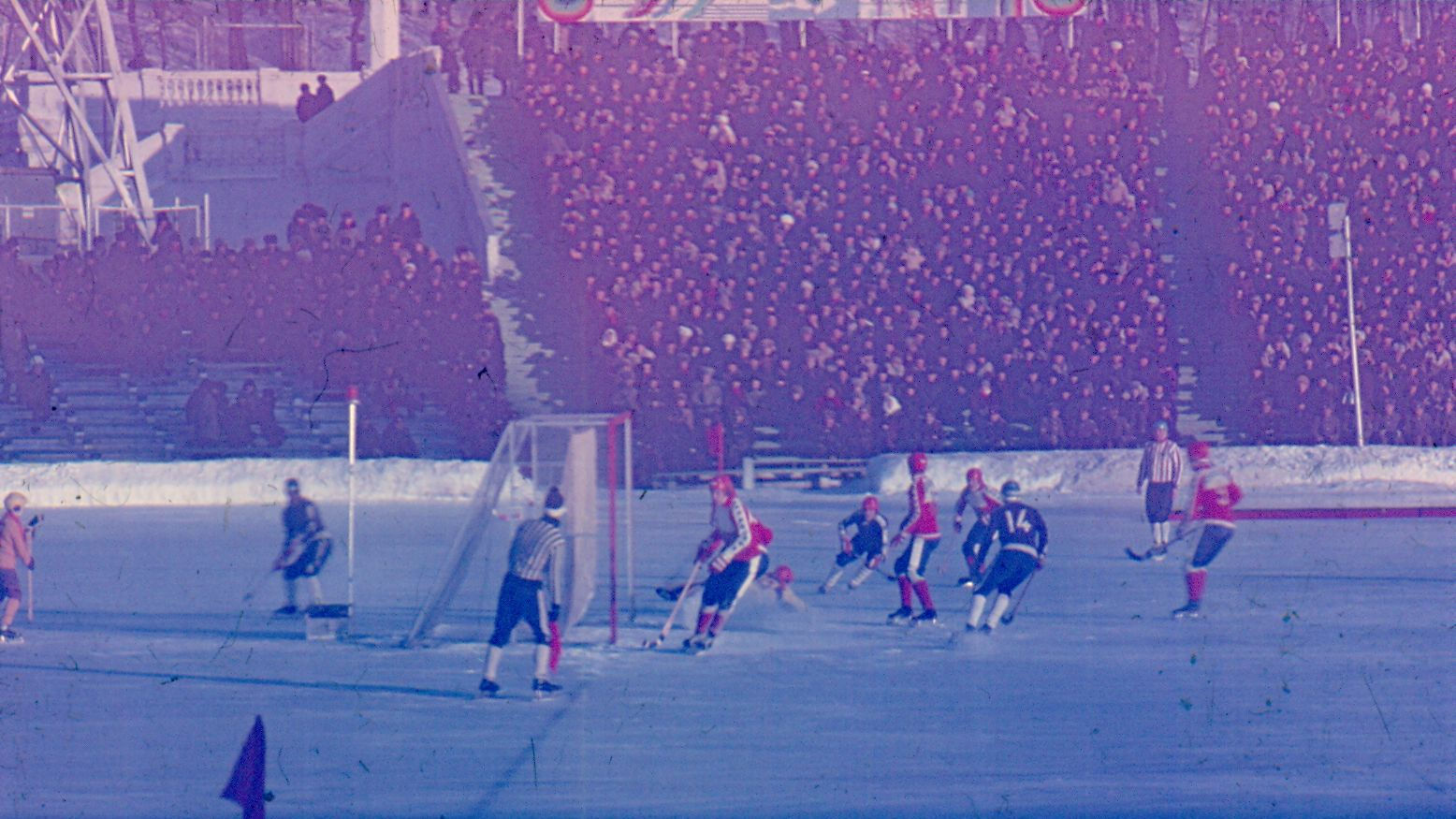
SKA Neftyanik in a home game against Yenisey in 1982

SKA Neftyanik (red) in a home game against Kuzbass (white) in the Russian Bandy Cup in 2026. The captain, Alan Djusoyev, is dribbling through the Kuzbass defence.

SKA-Neftyanik (Russian: СКА-Нефтяник) is a professional bandy club from Khabarovsk, Russia, established in 1947. It plays in the Russian Bandy Super League, the top division of Russian bandy. The club colours are yellow, red and black.

== History ==
The team was founded in 1947 and was known under the abbreviations ODO (Okruzhnoy Dom Ofitserov), SKVO (Sportivnyi Klub Voennogo Okruga) and eventually SKA (Sportivnyi Klub Armii). In 1999, after Neftyanik had qualified for the highest division, the two clubs merged to become SKA-Neftyanik. SKA played in the elite division of Soviet bandy ever since 1954.

Since the 2013–14 season the team plays at the indoor arena, Arena Yerofey. In the 2016–17 season the club became Russian champion for the first time. The club colours are red, yellow and black.

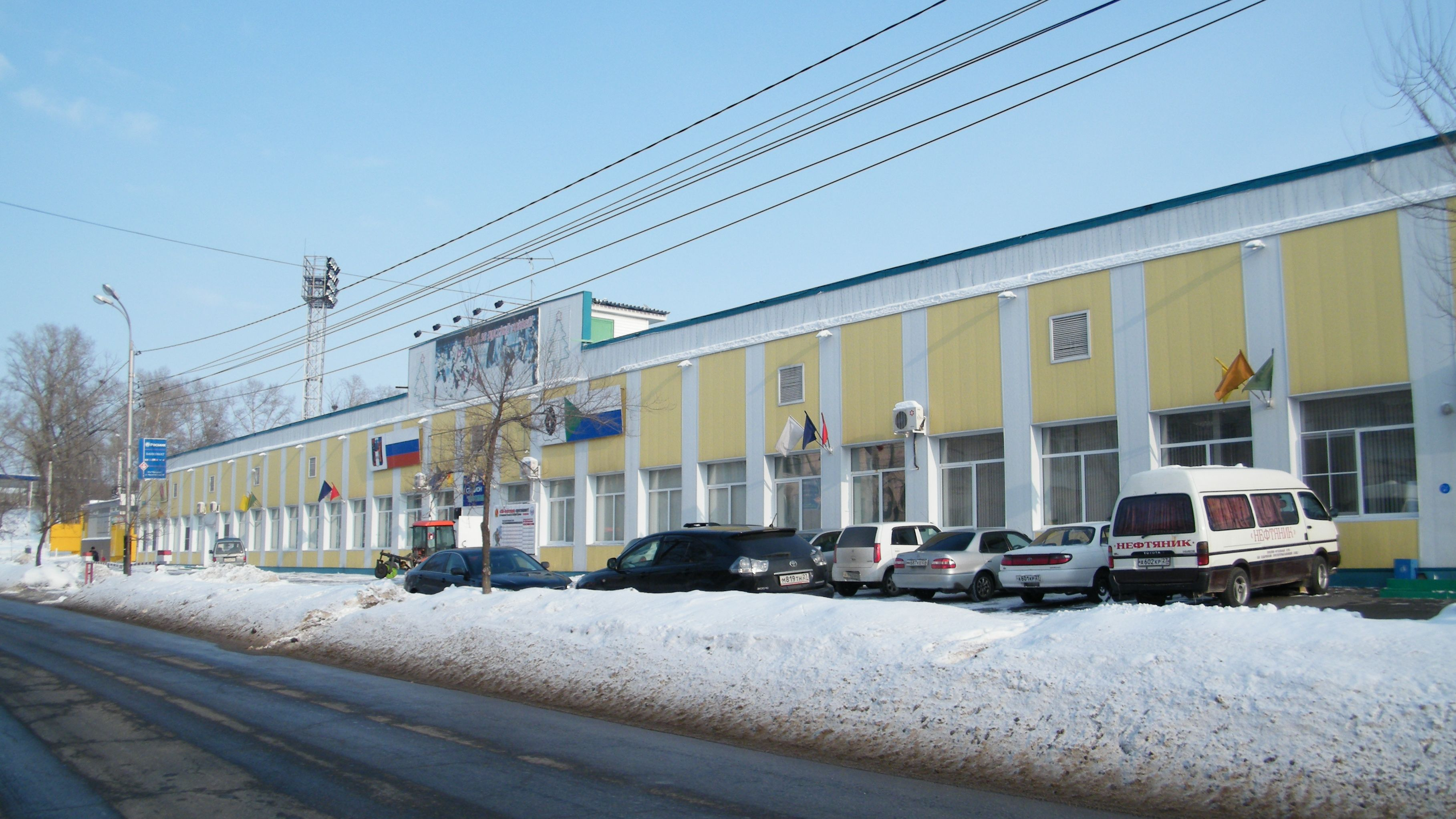
The "Neftyanik" Stadium, former home of SKA-Neftyanik.

== Latest season ==
In the 2025-26 season, SKA-Neftyanik performed well, only losing 2 games total and finishing 1st in the leaderboard. Despite this, they lost the champion title to Dynamo Moscow in a heated at-home finale game that finished 6:8. SKA-Neftyanik had 2 of the 4th best performing players, them being Vladimir Kalanchin (2nd) and Tuomas Määttä (4th). Their main goalkeeper, Grigory Lapin was on the field for 26 matches, spending an average of 84 minutes per game on the field. Despite managing to keep most of the team intact for the 2026-27 season, they had to end a contract with an important player, Alexander Yegorychev.

== Current season ==
In the 2026-27 season, SKA-Neftyanik started off strong by winning the Russian Cup. They sailed through the group stages quite easily, and defeated Dynamo Moscow 7:5 in a home finale. They also signed a forward from Dynamo Moscow, Yegor Akhmanayev, who did well in the cup. SKA-Neftyanik have also made a surprise move by signing Evgeny Dergayev, who was known for his loyalty to Vodnik. This transfer move was very controversial, as Dergayev has been playing continuously playing for Vodnik since 2006, and has been their star player and captain since the early 2010s, also being the second top scorer in Russian Bandy Super League history against SKA-Neftyanik, scoring 60 goals against them. Transfer rumors speculate that SKA-Neftyanik have offered Dergayev twice his salary at Vodnik, and due to Dergayev having issues with the higher-ups at Vodnik and also aging, he decided to leave.

In a later press conference, Dergayev said that he was accepted into the team well and admitted that he didn't want to leave Vodnik and Arkhangelsk in general. He told that he "wouldn't be bothered" if he finished his career at Vodnik without a championship title, but he considered SKA a "team with greater goals and ambitions" than Vodnik. It was later confirmed that SKA did offer him twice his salary.

== Honours ==
=== Domestic ===
- Russian Champions:
  - Winners (5): 2016–17, 2017–18, 2018–19, 2019–20, 2022-23
  - Runners-up (6): 1963–64, 1969–70, 1981–82, 1985–86, 1988–89, 2025-26

==== Cup ====
- Russian Cup:
  - Winners (9): 1988, 2002, 2004, 2014, 2016, 2017, 2018, 2022, 2026
  - Runners-up (3): 1954, 2003, 2015
- Russian Bandy Super Cup:
  - Winners (5): 2015, 2017 (January), 2019, 2020, 2021 (January)

=== International ===
- Champions Cup:
  - Runners-up (1): 2005

== Squad ==
As of 2026–27:

№	Name	Position	Nationality	Age
40	Lev Shishkin	GK	RUS	28
87	Grigory Lapin	GK	RUS	39
6	Valery Ivkin	DEF	RUS	29
54	Nikolay Konkov	DEF	RUS	29
66	Tommi Määttä	DEF	FIN	30
10	Kirill Butenko	MID	RUS	24
15	Alan Djusoyev (C)	MID	RUS	34
17	Yuriy Kudryavtsev	MID	RUS	20
19	Evgeny Dergayev	MID	RUS	38
21	Yuriy Shardakov	MID	RUS	36
23	Anton Kolpovsky	MID	RUS	23
71	Maxim Vasilenko	MID	RUS	34
72	Aleksandr Antipov	MID	RUS	37
77	Dmitry Anikin	MID	RUS	26
97	Semyon Chupin	MID	RUS	28
99	Tuomas Määttä	MID	FIN	30
7	Timur Starikov	ATT	RUS	19
11	Vladimir Kalanchin	ATT	RUS	29
22	Yegor Akhmanayev	ATT	RUS	25

Average age: 29 y/o

== SKA-Neftyanik-2 ==
SKA-Neftyanik's second team SKA-Neftyanik-2 plays in the Russian Bandy Supreme League, the second tier of Russian bandy. In the 2025-2026 season they finished 3rd in the Russian Bandy Supreme League 3rd Subgroup behind Baykal-Energiya and Kuzbass-2, then finished 2nd in the Subgroup B of the Finale 1st Stage behind Akademia Uralsky Trubnik, and finally reached 4th place by winning the matches for 4-6th places in the Finale 2nd Stage against Kuzbass-2 and Stroitel.

== See also ==
- Category:SKA-Neftyanik players
