= Start Nizhny Novgorod =

- City: Nizhny Novgorod, Russia
- League: Russian Bandy Supreme League
- Founded: 1932; 94 years ago
- Home arena: Start Stadium (capacity: 6200)
- Head coach: Alexey Dyakov
- Website: www.starthc.ru
| Home colours | Away colours |

Start (Russian: Старт) is a professional bandy club from Nizhny Novgorod, Russia, established in 1932. It plays in the Russian Bandy Supreme League, the second tier of Russian bandy.

Start was founded in 1932 as a team called Novoye Sormovo. The name was changed to Zenit in 1936, Trud in 1959 and ultimately Start Gorky in 1960. When the city of Gorky changed its names to Nizhny Novgorod in 1990, the club changed names accordingly. It played in the elite division of the Soviet bandy championship in 1967–1969, the 1973–74 season and permanently since the 1975–76 season. In 2026, for the first time in 50 years, due to financial difficulties and the stadium being in poor condition, Start was relegated to the Russian Bandy Supreme League.

== History ==
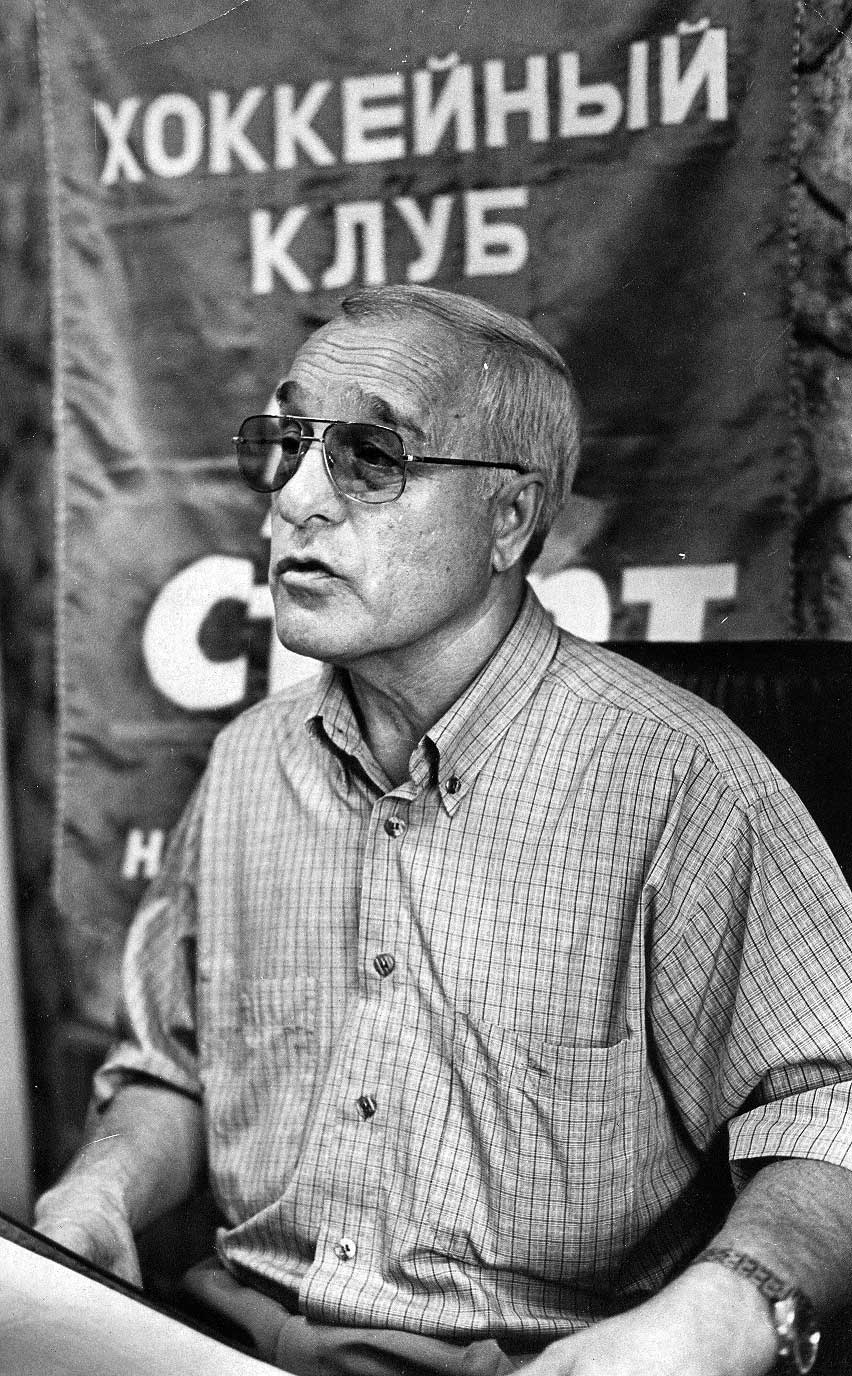
Yuriy Fokin, a former coach

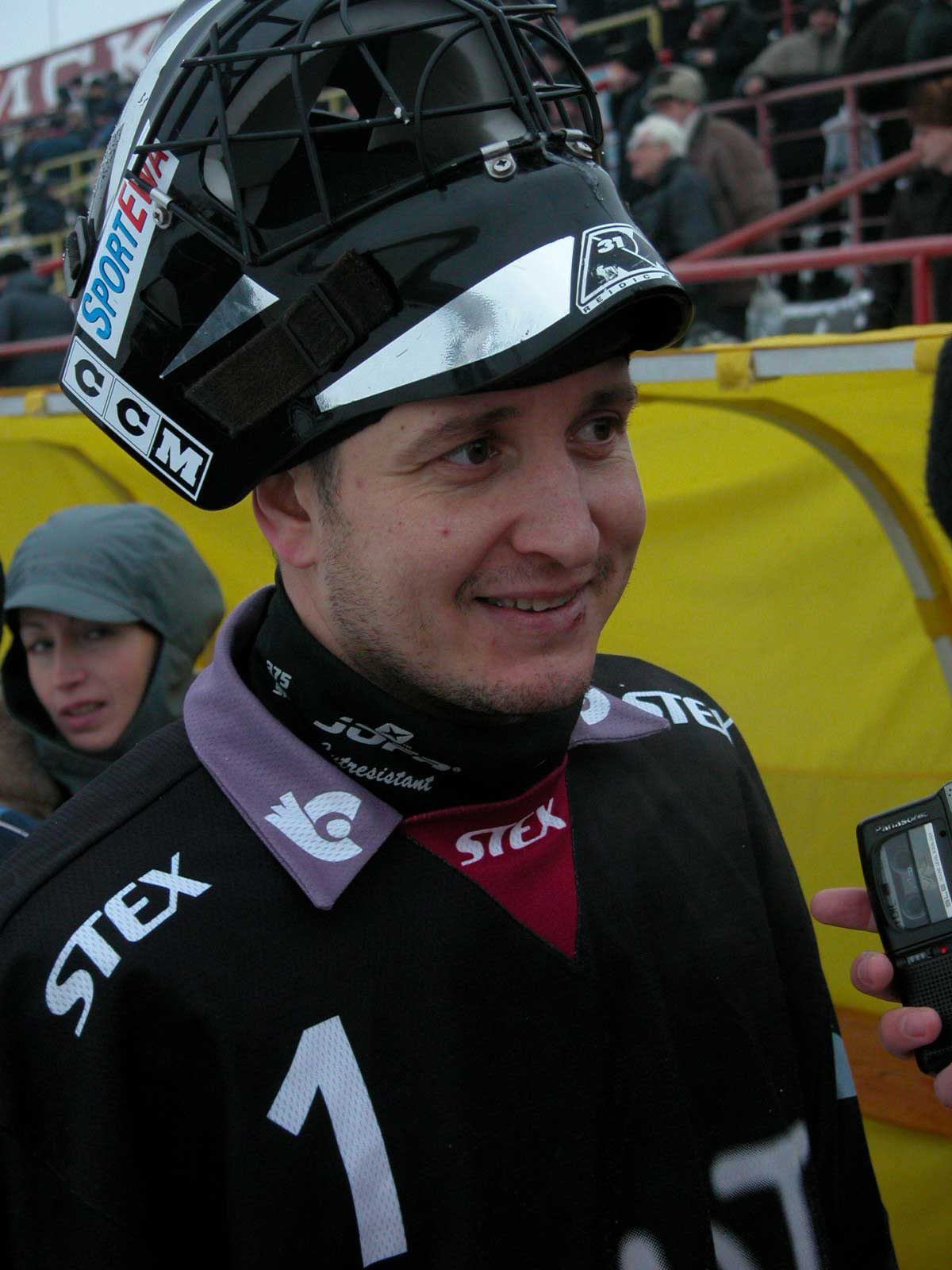
Vyacheslav Ryabov

The club was founded in 1932 and is the oldest sports club in Nizhny Novgorod. The current name is from the 1960/61 season. In the period from 1951 to 1964, as well as in the 1970/71 season, he played in the zonal and final tournaments of the RSFSR championships. Since the 1964/65 season, he has been a regular participant in the USSR Championships (with the exception of the 1970/71 season). In the second group of class "A" of the USSR championship – 1964–1967, 1969/70, 1971–1973. In the first league of the championship of the USSR – 1974/75. In the years 1967–1969 and in the 1973/74 season, he appeared in the first group of class "A". In the 1967/68 season, he played in the top league of the USSR Championship. In the 1975/76 season, he returned to the elite division, where he is still playing.

In the summer of 1965 there was a change of coach in the team. Georgy Sergeyevich Shtyrov went to work at the Lokomotiv Junior Sports School for football. "Start" was headed by his player, Yuriy Yefimovich Fokin, who a year before had arrived in Gorky from Alma-Ata. The arrival of the new coach, who had the experience of playing in the class of the strongest, as well as special education and enormous organizational skills, gave a new impetus to the development of the team. All the highest achievements of the team in the Russian (Soviet) bandy elite are directly connected with the name of the Honored Coach of the USSR and Russia Yuriy Fokin. It was under his leadership that "Start" won silver medals three times (in 1980, 1995 and 2002), three times (in 1996, 1998 and 2000) bronze medals and once the USSR Cup (in 1983). During Soviet times, Yuriy Fokin worked as the second coach in the national team of the country, and in the 2004 season – as the head coach of the Russian national team.

Since the 1960/61 season, the team has found its current name – "Start". From the 2007/08 season for seven seasons, Start was headed by his former player, Alexey Dyakov.

Since the 2014/15 season, the coaching staff has changed in the team. Eduard Saxonov, who previously worked with Start-2, became the head coach. His teammates of the 1990s – the beginning of the 2000s Vyacheslav Ryabov and Yury Loginov helped him. Chairman of the Board – Yury Yerofeyev. And from the middle of the 2015/16 season, Igor Chilikin was the head coach of Start. In that season, the team took the highest place in its "newest" history – the 7th.

In the middle of the 2016/17 season, there was a change of head coach again – they became MSMK and world championship silver medalist Andrey Begunov. Since the 2017/18 season, Vyacheslav Ryabov has been working as the sports director of the club, and since the summer of 2016 he has been the president of FHSMNO.

In the middle of the 2017/18 season, the head coach of Start was again taken over by Aleksey Grigoryevich Dyakov, who returned from Dynamo Moscow, and Eduard Saxonov became his assistant.

In 2018/19 season, they beat the reigning champion of Sweden – Edsbyns and also defeated Yenisey in the quarter-finals – 0:4 Nizhny Novgorod "Start" for the first time in its history reached the World Cup semifinal.

On the 2nd of March, 2026, Start was awarded a defeat in a game against Kuzbass because their stadium was deemed unfit for matches. Following many similar complications, Start were relegated to the Supreme League and are playing there since the 2026-27 season.

== Honours ==
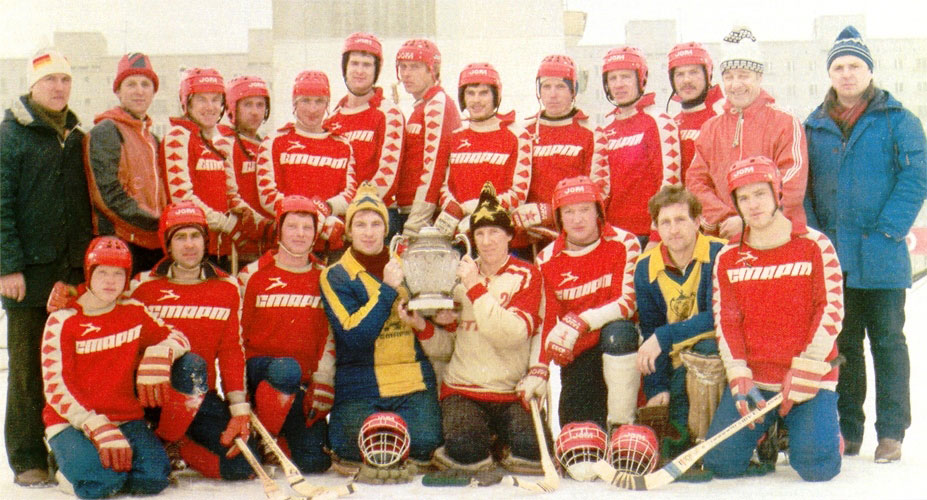
"Start" with the USSR Cup in 1983.

World Cup

- Third place in the World Cup 2018/19

Russian/USSR Cup

- Winner USSR Cup 1982/83
- Finalist USSR Cup 1985/86
- Finalist Russian Cup 1997/98

Russian/USSR Super League

- Silver medalist Russian Super League 1994/95, 2001/02
- Silver medalist USSR Super League 1979/80
- Bronze medalist Russian Super League 1995/96, 1997/98, 1999/2000

Championship of the RSFSR

- Champion of the RSFSR 1963/64
- Silver medalist RSFSR 1962/63
- Bronze medalist RSFSR 1960/61

== Line-up ==
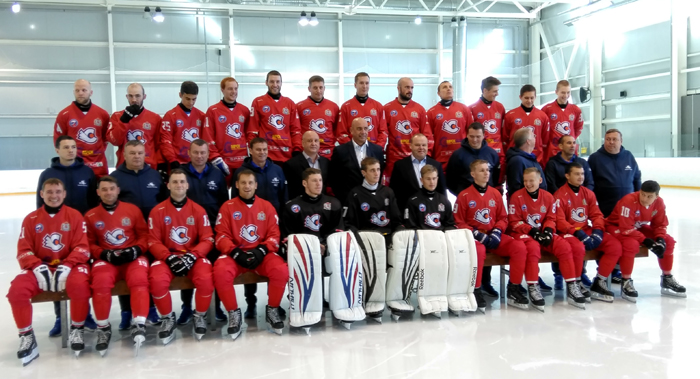
Start's squad in the 2018-19 season.

As of 2018-2019

| # | Position | Last name, first name | Rank | Citizenship | Date of birth |
|---|---|---|---|---|---|
| 1 | goalkeeper | Maxim Bolotov | kms | Russia | 14.01.1995 |
| 97 | goalkeeper | Yuri Ivanchikov | kms | Russia | 22.08.1997 |
| 98 | goalkeeper | Dmitry Shkilev | kms | Russia | 22.09.1998 |
| 2 | DF | Denis Maximenko | msmk | Russia, Kazakhstan | 15.10.1983 |
| 13 | DF | Vadim Vasilyev | ms | Russia | 11.08.1993 |
| 15 | DF | Anatoly Golubkov | zms | Russia, Kazakhstan | 01.12.1988 |
| 28 | DF | Maxim Logoshin | kms | Russia | 01.09.1999 |
| 77 | DF | Andrey Osipenkov | kms | Russia | 17.05.1994 |
| 10 | LM/RM | Sergey Katugin | ms | Russia | 13.08.1987 |
| 17 | LM/RM | Yegor Dashkov | ms | Russia | 23.10.1997 |
| 19 | LM/RM | Dmitry Savelyev | zms | Russia | 22.02.1979 |
| 23 | LM/RM | Alexey Bushuev | msmk | Russia | 11.04.1985 |
| 25 | LM/RM | Nikita Kochetov | kms | Russia | 22.02.2000 |
| 35 | LM/RM | Roman Ledyankin | kms | Russia | 25.10.2000 |
| 51 | LM/RM | Maxim Gavrilenko | ms | Russia, Kazakhstan | 20.08.1981 |
| 86 | LM/RM | Vitaly Usov | kms | Russia | 10.10.1996 |
| 12 | CM | Denis Kotkov | ms | Russia | 22.07.1984 |
| 14 | CM | Evgeny Korev | ms | Russia | 05.07.1986 |
| 18 | CM | Alexey Kiselev | kms | Russia | 29.08.1988 |
| 70 | CM | Evgeny Neronov | kms | Russia | 05.03.1998 |
| 4 | FW | Patrick Johansson | — | Sweden | 19.09.1988 |
| 9 | FW | Stanislav Ismagilov | ms | Russia | 25.01.1985 |
| 71 | FW | Alexander Stepanov | ms | Russia | 17.08.1998 |

== Club infrastructure ==
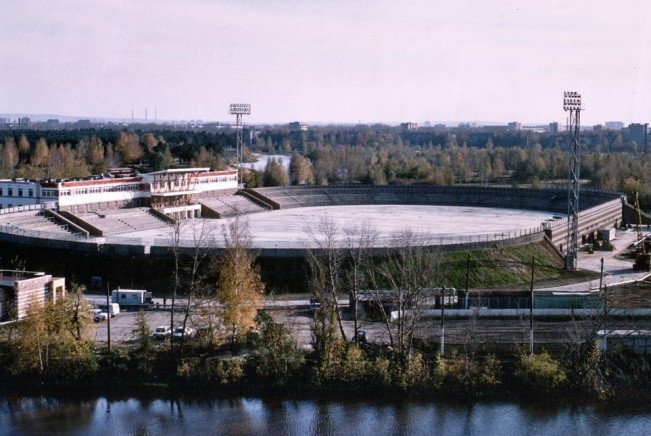
The Trud Stadium

- The Trud Stadium is located in the Sormovsky District of Nizhny Novgorod. The stadium was built in 2003 and seats 20.079 people. It has not held a single bandy game since 2009.
- The Start Stadium is located in the Moskovsky District of Nizhny Novgorod. It was built in 1980 and is the current home of Start.
- The pre-season preparation of the Start team players is carried out in the Nizhny Novgorod sports complex “Yunost'”, and they also use the sports complex “Krasnaya Gorka” and the Sports Center “Borsky” in the city of Bor.

== Start-2 ==
Start's second team Start-2 plays in the Russian Bandy Supreme League, the second tier of Russian bandy.
