= Dynamo Moscow (bandy) =

Ice hockey team in Moscow

- City: Moscow, Russia
- League: Russian Bandy Super League
- Founded: 1923; 103 years ago
- Home arena: Ice Palace Krylatskoye
- Head coach: Ilias Igorevich Khandayev
Home colours	Away colours

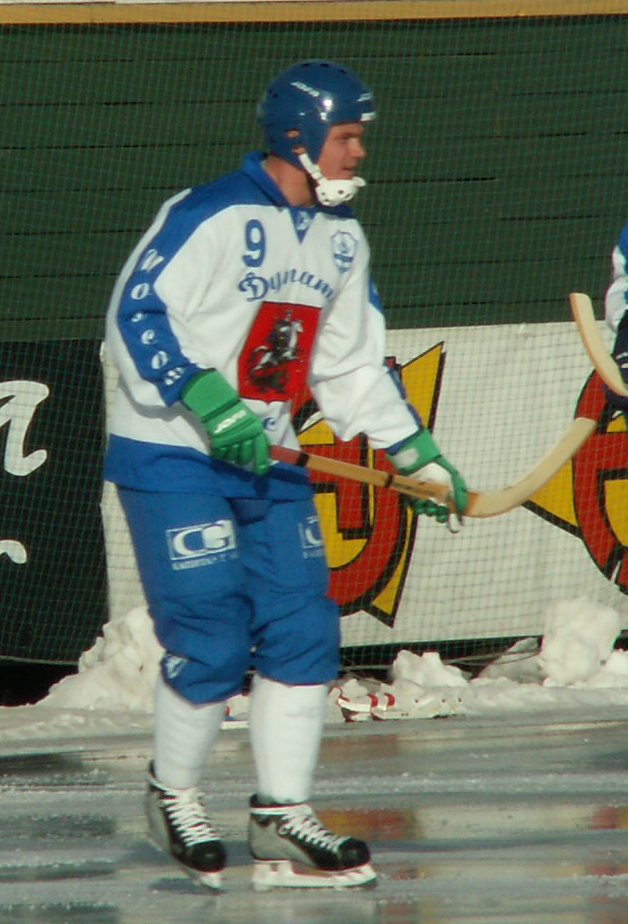
Alexandr Tyukavin of Dynamo Moscow

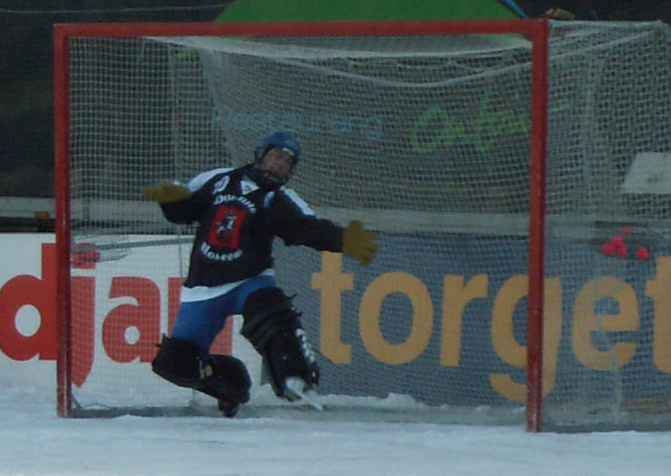
The goalkeeper Kirill Khvalko

Dynamo Moscow (Russian: "Динамо" Москва) is a Russian Bandy club from Moscow which was founded in 1923.

The bandy team plays in the new Ice Palace Krylatskoye in the outskirts of Moscow. Krylatskoye has hosted both Bandy World Championships and World Speed Skating Championships.

Dynamo Moscow won the World Cup for the first time in 2006, defeating Zorky in the final. The 2006 domestic title was followed by another four consecutive Russian championship titles, until 2017, when they missed the championship play-off, only coming in at eighth place in the regular season league. Dynamo reached the finale of the Russian Bandy Cup in 2026, but lost to SKA-Neftyanik.

== Honours ==
=== Domestic ===
- Russian Champions:
  - Winners (22): 1936, 1951, 1952, 1961, 1963, 1964, 1965, 1967, 1969, 1970, 1972, 1973, 1975, 1976, 1978, 2006, 2007, 2008, 2009, 2010, 2012, 2013, 2020, 2022, 2025
  - Runners-up (15): 1950, 1954, 1959, 1966, 1968, 1971, 1974, 1977, 1984, 1987, 1988, 2011, 2014, 2015, 2019, 2021
- Russian Cup:
  - Winners (20): 1937, 1938, 1940, 1941, 1947, 1948, 1949, 1950, 1951, 1952, 1953, 1954, 1987, 2005, 2006, 2008, 2010 (played in 2011), 2011, 2012, 2019, 2020, 2021
  - Runners-up (5): 1988, 1989, 1991, 2018, 2026

=== International ===
- World Cup:
  - Winners (3): 2006, 2007, 2013
  - Runners-up (1): 1987
- European Cup:
  - Winners (6): 1975, 1976, 1978, 2006, 2008, 2009
  - Runners-up (1): 2007
- Edsbyn Champions Cup:
  - Winners (4): 2006, 2008, 2013, 2015
  - Runners-up (2): 2010, 2014
