= Zorky Krasnogorsk =

Bandy club based in Krasnogorsk, Russia

Zorky
- City: Krasnogorsk, Russia
- League: Russian Bandy Super League
- Founded: 1954; 72 years ago
- Home arena: Zorky Stadium
- Head coach: Nikolay Kulagin
- Website: www.zorky.ru
Home colours	Away colours

Zorky (Russian: Зоркий) is a bandy club based in Krasnogorsk, Moscow Oblast, Russia. Its team currently plays in the Russian Bandy Supreme League, the 2nd tier of the Russian bandy championship.

== History ==
The club was founded in 1954. Zorky have had some recent successes and reached the finals of the Bandy World Cup, Russian Cup and Champions Cup in the 2006–07 season only to lose to Dynamo Moscow in all three matches. In 2009 they reached the World Cup final again, this time losing to Hammarby. In 2012, they won the World Cup. The team was the best team of the regular season of the Russian Bandy Super League 2012–13 but lost the final against Dynamo Moscow for the national championship.

For the 2016–17 season, the team almost got bankrupt and was relegated to the Russian Bandy Supreme League. For the 2017–18 season, it returned to the Super League.

The club also has a women's team. This won the national championship for women in 2012 and in 2015.

Zorky's home shirts are yellow.

== Honours ==
=== Domestic ===
- Russian Champions (men):
  - Winners (3): 1979, 1992, 1993

==== Cup ====
- Russian Bandy Cup:
  - Winners (6): 1985, 1986, 1989, 1990, 1991, 1993

=== International ===
- World Cup:
  - Winners (2): 1990, 2012
  - Runners-up (2): 2006, 2009
- European Cup:
  - Winners (1): 1992
- Champions Cup:
  - Winners (3): 2010, 2011, 2012
  - Runners-up (3): 2006, 2007, 2009

== Zorky-2 ==
Zorky's second team Zorky-2 plays in the Russian Bandy Supreme League, the second tier of Russian bandy.

== See also ==
- Category:Zorky Krasnogorsk players
