= Krasnogorsk, Moscow Oblast =

City in Russia

Krasnogorsk Красногорск
- City
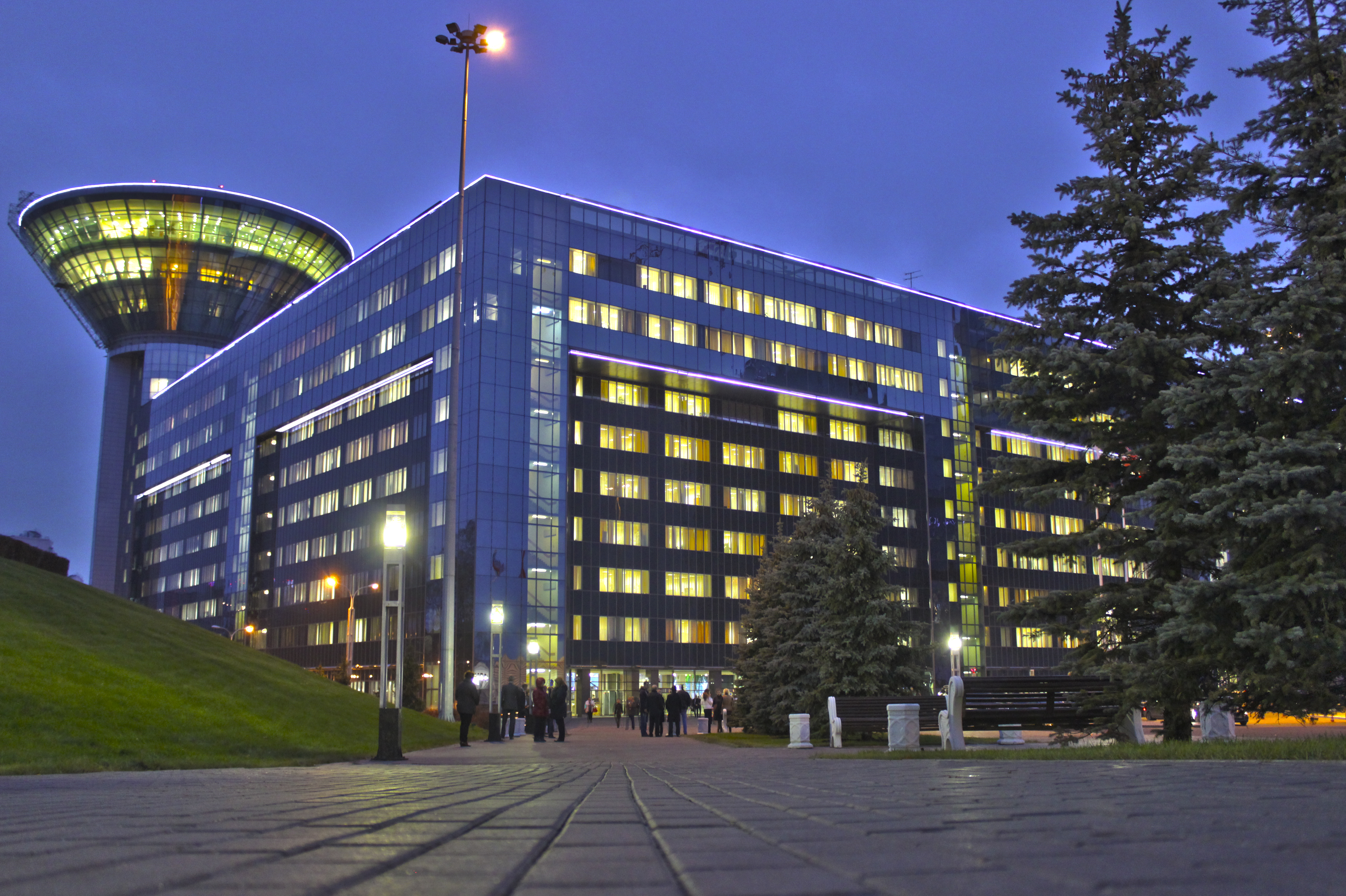
- Moscow Oblast Government building

- Flag Coat of arms
- Interactive map of Krasnogorsk
- Location of Krasnogorsk Krasnogorsk (European Russia) Krasnogorsk (Europe)
- Coordinates: 55°49′18″N 37°20′19″E
- Country: Russia
- Federal subject: Moscow Oblast
- Administrative district: Krasnogorsky District
- CitySelsoviet: Krasnogorsk
- Founded: 1932
- City status since: 1940
- Elevation: 150 m (490 ft)

Population (2010 Census)
  - Total: 116,896
  - Estimate (2025): 196,987 (+68.5%)
  - Rank: 139th in 2010

Administrative status
  - Capital of: Krasnogorsky District, City of Krasnogorsk

Municipal status
  - Municipal district: Krasnogorsky Municipal District
  - Urban settlement: Krasnogorsk Urban Settlement
  - Capital of: Krasnogorsky Municipal District, Krasnogorsk Urban Settlement
- Time zone: UTC+3 (MSK)
- Postal codes: 143401–143409, 143416, 143448, 143449, 994001
- OKTMO ID: 46744000001
- Website: krasnogorsk-adm.ru

Krasnogorsk (Russian: Красногорск, IPA: [krəsnɐˈgorsk]) is a city and the administrative center of Krasnogorsky District in Moscow Oblast, Russia, located on the Moskva River, adjacent to the northwestern boundary of Moscow. It has a population of 187,634 (2021 census);

== History ==
An urban-type settlement was established here in 1932, to which town status was granted in 1940.

In the 1940s, the Antifascist Central School, in which many foreign Communists studied and lectured, was located at Krasnogorsk. After the Battle of Stalingrad in 1943, Krasnogrsk became the birthplace of The National Committee for a Free Germany (NKFD), an organization of German exiles living in the Soviet Union. Many members of this organization would play a role in the establishment of the German Democratic Republic and its military.

After the war, the German V2 rocket scientists whom the Soviet Army had captured were taken here with their families for sharashka work.

=== 2024 terror attack ===
On 22 March 2024, four terrorists opened fire and detonated explosives in a coordinated attack at the Crocus City Hall music venue in Krasnogorsk, killing 151 people and injuring 609 more. The Islamic State – Khorasan Province (IS-KP or ISIS–K), a South-Central Asia-based regional affiliate of the Islamic State, claimed responsibility.

== Administrative and municipal status ==
Within the framework of administrative divisions, Krasnogorsk serves as the administrative center of Krasnogorsky District. As an administrative division, it is, together with two rural localities, incorporated within Krasnogorsky District as the Town of Krasnogorsk. As a municipal division, the Town of Krasnogorsk is incorporated within Krasnogorsky Municipal District as Krasnogorsk Urban Settlement.

Historical population
Year	Pop.	±%
1939	18,385	—
1959	35,183	+91.4%
1970	62,690	+78.2%
1979	77,370	+23.4%
1989	90,477	+16.9%
2002	92,545	+2.3%
2010	116,896	+26.3%
2021	187,634	+60.5%
Source: Census data

== Economy ==
The city is known for the Krasnogorsky Zavod company, which produced the Zorki, Zenit, and Krasnogorsk cameras there until the early 1990s. The coat of arms acknowledges this by featuring a prism and light rays.

Krasnogorsk is one of the few oblast cities that is connected to Moscow via Moscow Metro. It is served by Metro station Myakinino (named after a nearby village).

Crocus Expo, Russia's largest exhibition center, opened in 2002 provided entertainment and congregation until the March 22, 2024 terrorist attack at Crocus City Hall killed 151, and injured 609 concertgoers, heavily damaged by terrorists using incendiary explosives.

== Education and culture ==
Education is represented by 18 government and four private schools.

In Krasnogorsk there is The Moscow Region Palace of Culture, the Scarlet Sails Concert Hall with an organ function (the Krasnogorsk Philharmonic Society operates on the basis of the hall). Krasnogorsk has the only museum of German anti-fascists in the country.

== Sports ==
The city is home to Zorky Krasnogorsk bandy team, who are former national champions for men (three titles, one each for Soviet Union, Commonwealth of Independent States (the only season that title was played for) and Russia). After getting in financial problems, the team did not play in the 2016–17 Russian Bandy Super League, but has returned to the highest division for the 2017–18 season. The club has also become national champions for women. Their home arena, Zorky Stadium, has a capacity of 8,000. From December 7th to the 9th, 2017, it has hosted a four nations tournament.

== Notable people ==
Krasnogorsk is the birthplace of Russian former hockey player Vladimir Petrov.

American-born MMA fighter Jeff Monson was elected to the local council in 2018. He said "I was invited by United Russia party to run but I am independent. Unfortunately I learned there are no communists in Communist party in Russia."

== Twin towns – sister cities ==
Krasnogorsk is twinned with:

- Antibes, France
- Goirle, Netherlands
- Höchstadt an der Aisch, Germany
- Karelichy, Belarus
- Slivnitsa, Bulgaria
- Tukums, Latvia
- Wągrowiec, Poland
