= Start Stadium (Nizhny Novgorod) =

Coordinates: 56.3394°N 43.8743°E

- Interactive map of Start Stadium
- Location: Nizhny Novgorod, Russia
- Capacity: 6,200

Construction
- Opened: 1980

Tenant
- Start

Start Stadium is a sports venue in Nizhny Novgorod. It is the home of Start.
