= Pervouralsk =

City in Sverdlovsk Oblast, Russia

Pervouralsk Первоуральск
- City

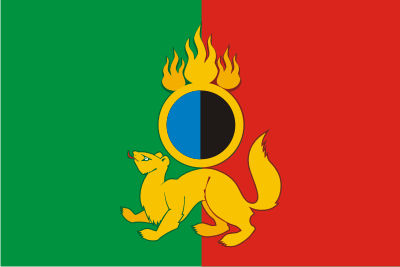
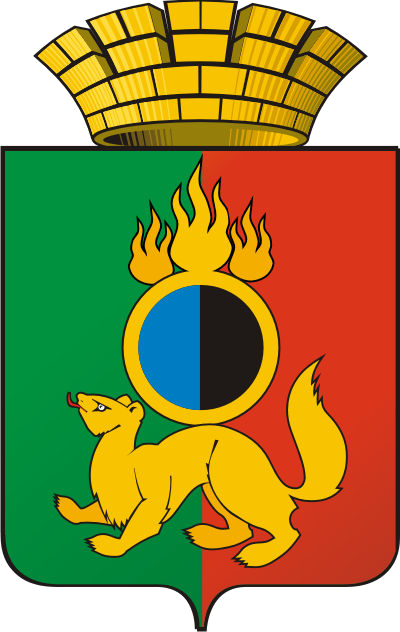
- Flag Coat of arms
- Interactive map of Pervouralsk
- Location of Pervouralsk Pervouralsk (Sverdlovsk Oblast)
- Coordinates: 56°55′N 59°56′E
- Country: Russia
- Federal subject: Sverdlovsk Oblast
- Founded: 1732
- City status since: 1933

Government
  - Head: Nikolay Kozlov
- Elevation: 358 m (1,175 ft)

Population (2010 Census)
  - Total: 124,528
  - Estimate (2025): 110,999 (−10.9%)
  - Rank: 130th in 2010

Administrative status
  - Subordinated to: City of Pervouralsk
  - Capital of: City of Pervouralsk

Municipal status
  - Urban okrug: Pervouralsk Urban Okrug
  - Capital of: Pervouralsk Urban Okrug
- Time zone: UTC+5 (MSK+2)
- Postal codes: 623100–623105, 623107–623113, 623116, 623118, 623119, 623159
- Dialing code: +7 3439
- OKTMO ID: 65753000001
- Website: www.prvadm.ru

Pervouralsk (Russian: Первоура́льск, lit. the first in the Urals) is a city in Sverdlovsk Oblast, Russia, located on the Chusovaya River (Kama's tributary). Its many plants, factories, and other manufacturing enterprises make the city one of the largest industrial centers of the Urals. It is one of the easternmost cities in Europe.

It was previously known as Vasilyevsko-Shaytansky (until 1920).

== Geography ==
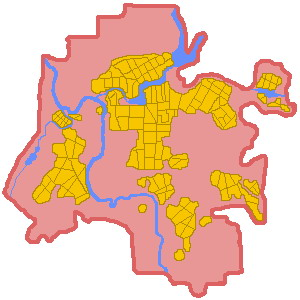
Map of Pervouralsk

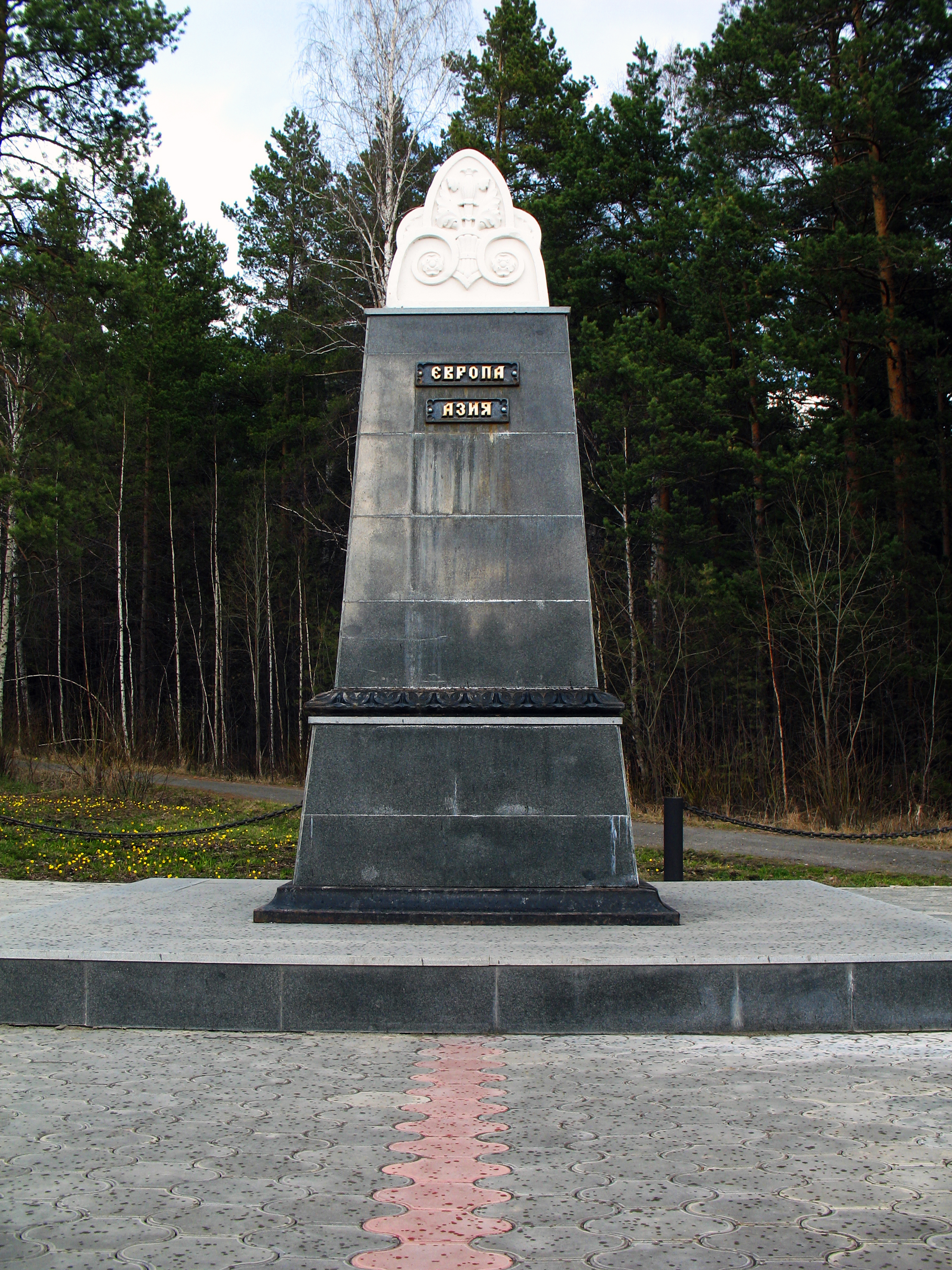
Monument that symbolizes the border between Europe and Asia in Р242 road

A monument that symbolizes the border between the continents of Europe and Asia is located two kilometers from the city.coordinate:56°52′04.00″N 60°02′41.70″E

== History ==
History of Pervouralsk began in 1730, when Vasily Demidov began the building of the iron-making factory. It produced pipes for more than 200 years. On December 1, 1732, the factory started operating; this date is now considered the official date of the city's foundation. The village around the factory was named Vasilyevsko-Shaytansky. In 1920, the village was renamed Pervouralsk. After building Pervouralsky Novotrubny Works in 1933, the village was granted town status.

== Administrative and municipal status ==
Within the framework of the administrative divisions, it is, together with twenty-nine rural localities, incorporated as the City of Pervouralsk'—an administrative unit with the status equal to that of the districts. As a municipal division, the City of Pervouralsk is incorporated as Pervouralsk Urban Okrug.

== Coat of arms ==
The coat of arms of the city was adopted in 2002. The sable is taken from a label of Demidov's steel factory. The ring actually represents a section of a pipe. Pipes are basic production of Pervouralsk.

== Economy ==
Pervouralsk is the second fastest-developing city in Sverdlovsk Oblast after Yekaterinburg (2005 Ural Information Bureau). The annual growth rate of industrial output remains steadily at 25-30%; the retail turnover increases 20% a year (2005 Ural Information Bureau). This positively affects the unemployment rate, which stays at low 1.16% (2005 Ural Information Bureau), and leads to the number of vacancies to exceed the number of unemployed people.

Average monthly salary is about $300, which is a little bit lower than the average in the region, which is $350 (Local Information Centre).

The city attracts attention of large businesses—only within last years there happens merges and acquisitions with Pervourask enterprises, such as Wimm-Bill-Dann, a well known dairy company, acquiring a dairy plant in Pervouralsk and Chelyabinsk Pipe Group, the second largest in the country, acquiring Pervouralsk Novotrubny Works.

=== Pervouralsky Novotrubny Works ===
Established in 1934 on the boundary between Europe and Asia in the heart of the Ural Mountains, it has inherited the traditions and high industrial standards of Ural craftsmen, whose products have been renowned throughout Europe since 17th century.

Pervouralsky Novotrubny Works produces more than 25,000 types and sizes of pipes and specially shaped tubes from 200 carbon, alloyed and stainless steel grades according to 34 Russian and 25 foreign standards and 400 specifications.

Certification by the American Petroleum Institute and the German TUV for meeting DIN standard requirements, as well as a number of other requirements, attests to the quality of pipes produced by Pervouralsky Novotrubny Works. L It was acquired by Chelyabinsk Pipe Group in 2005.

=== JSC Pervouralsk Plant of the Tubular Building Constructions (PZTSK) ===
Major plant foe=r metal constructing, wall and roofing panels in the Russian Federation since 1975. Also offers construction decisions and installation of buildings. PZTSK's quality management system is in accordance with the requirements of DIN EN ISO 9001:2000.

=== Pervouralsk Plant of Complete Metallic Construction ===
The plant is a major enterprise in Russia for the field of designing, producing and assembling of building and light metallic construction of complete delivery. At the present moment the plant produces 1,300 tons of metallic constructions, 35,000 m^{2} of wall roof panels and 7,000 m^{2} of windows per month.

=== Pervouralsk City Dairy Plant LLC ===
The plant was put into operation in 1970; its designed capacity is 120 tons per day. Currently the plant processes up to 20 tons of milk per day and specializes in the production of natural dairy and curds products, as well as drinking yogurts under the "Snegirevo" brand. The plant employs 165 people. It was acquired by Wimm-Bill-Dann Foods OJDS in 2006.

=== JSC Pervouralsk Silica Plant (JSC Dinur) ===
One of the biggest refractory plant, manufacturing shaped and monolithic refractories. The company is the only producer of silica bricks in Russia, JSC Dinur has 3,000 employees.

The plant has its own deposit of crystalline quartzite (Karaulnaya mountain), suitable for production of high quality silica bricks, milled quartzite.

JSC Dinur exports silica bricks for coke ovens to Algeria, Egypt, the Czech Republic, Poland etc. The company fully provides the Russian market with its products.

== Education ==
Pervouralsk metallurgical college was founded in 1945. There are branches of the Ural State Technical University and Russian State Vocational Pedagogical University.

Pervouralsk metallurgical college

== Sports ==
Uralsky Trubnik Bandy Club plays in Russian Bandy Super League. It is one of the few clubs with many foreign players. Their home arena has a capacity of 6000. After the indoor stadium Volga-Sport-Arena in Ulyanovsk was finished, it is the only Russian Bandy Super League venue without artificial ice. However, a decision to build an indoor bandy stadium has been taken.

There are Water Sports Palace and Ice Sports Palace, ski resorts at Pilnaya and Teplaya mountains.

== Cultural life ==
Drama theatre 'Variant' was founded back in 1982 by amateur actors. The Innovative cultural center was founded in 2016 and where museum exhibitions and concerts take place.

== Notable people ==
- Gennady Burbulis (b. 1945), politician
- Nikolai Chigirinsky (b. 1983), serial killer
- Andrei Dobrokhodov (b. 1984), skater
- Igor Dyatlov, who died in the Dyatlov Pass incident in 1959.
- Wolf Gorelik (b. 1933), conductor
- Alexandra Kapustina (b. 1984), hockey player
- Alyona Khomich (b. 1981), hockey player
- Alexander Korovin (b. 1994), skater
- Lev Kovpak (b. 1978), politician
- Yulia Leskina (b. 1991), hockey player
- Vitaly Malkin (b. 1952), businessperson
- Igor Malkov (b. 1965), speed skater
- Sergei Rylov (b.1975), skater
- Yekaterina Smolentseva (b. 1981), hockey player
- Sergey Stvolov (b. 1964), military officer
- Ivan Teplykh (b. 1985), sprinter
- Svetlana Terentieva (b. 1983), hockey player
- Yuri Tsaler (b. 1973), musician
- Mark Urvanov (b. 1996), boxer
- Artem Znachkov (b. 1979), skater
