= Ak Bars-Raketa =

- City: Kazan, Russia
- League: Russian Bandy Super League
- Founded: 1958; 68 years ago
- Home arena: Raketa Stadium
- Website: https://www.akbars-raketa.ru/
Home colours	Away colours

Ak Bars-Raketa (Russian: Ак Барс-Ракета,Tatar: Ак Барс-Ракета) formerly known as Raketa (Russian: Ракета) (1958–2008), Dynamo Kazan (Russian: Динамо Казань) (2008-2020) and Ak Bars-Dynamo Kazan (Russian: Ак Барс-Динамо Казань) (2020-2026) is a professional bandy club from Kazan, Russia, established in 1958 and playing in the Russian Bandy League since 1996. The club plays at Raketa Stadium, an outdoor arena with artificial ice of 5,000 spectators' capacity in the outskirts of Kazan. The club renamed to Ak Bars-Dynamo in 2020. The club cut ties with the Dynamo Sports Club in 2026 and renamed itself to Ak Bars-Raketa, and are named that ever since.

In the 2010–11 season the club won the Bandy League for the first time, and thus became Russian bandy champions.

== Honours ==
=== Domestic ===
- Russian Champions:
  - Winners (1): 2011

==== Cup ====
- Russian Bandy Cup:
  - Winners (2): 2009, 2013

=== International ===
- World Cup:
  - Winners (1): 2010
  - Runners-up (1): 2013
- Champions Cup:
  - Winners (1): 2009

== Dynamo Kazan-2 ==
Dynamo Kazan's second team Dynamo Kazan-2 plays in the Russian Bandy Supreme League, the second tier of Russian bandy.
