= Ice Palace Krylatskoye =

Indoor ice rink in Moscow, Russia

Coordinates: 55.7667°N 37.4351°E

Krylatskoye Ice Palace
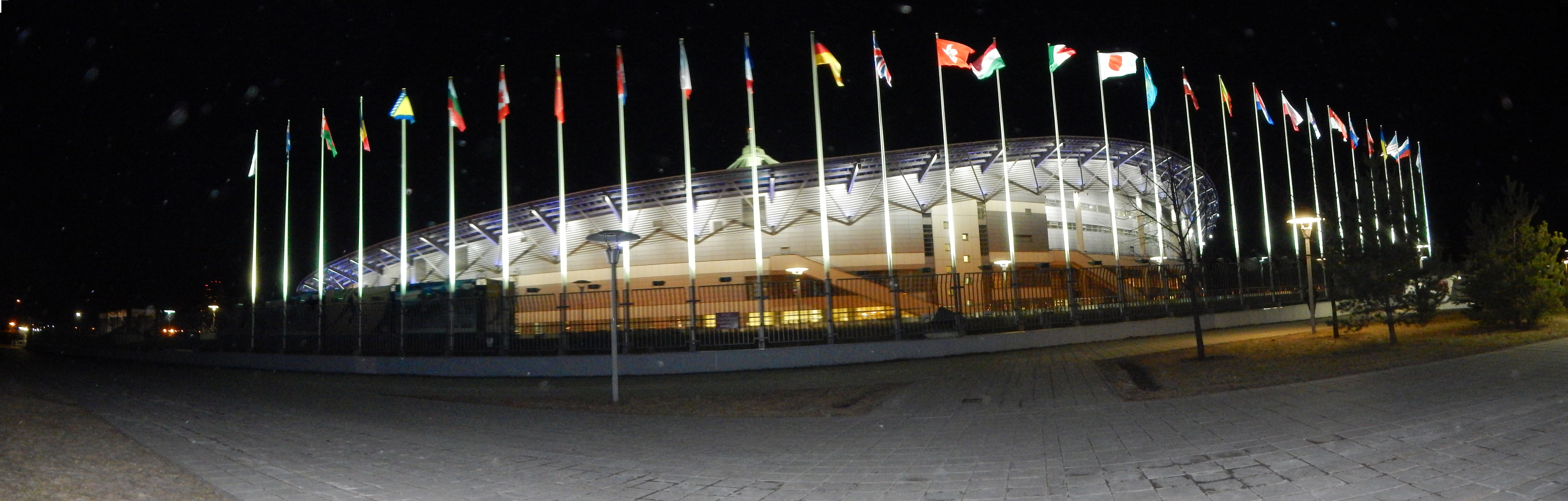
- Interactive map of Krylatskoye Ice Palace
- Location: Krylatskoye District, Moscow, Russia
- Capacity: 8,000

Construction
- Opened: 2004

Tenant
- Dynamo Moscow

Krylatskoye Ice Palace (Russian: Ледовый дворец «Крылатское») is an indoor ice arena for speed skating and bandy located in Krylatskoye District, Moscow, Russia. It is the home of Dynamo Moscow bandy club.

Events and tenants
| Preceded by ABB Arena Syd; Västerås | Bandy World Championship; Final Venue; 2010 | Succeeded by Trudovye Rezervy Stadium; Kazan |
| Preceded by Vikingskipet; Hamar | World Allround Speed Skating Championships; Final Venue; 2005 | Succeeded by Olympic Oval; Calgary |
| Preceded by Olympic Stadium | Fed Cup; Final venue 2004 | Succeeded by Court Philippe Chatrier |
