= Yenisey Krasnoyarsk (bandy) =

Yenisey
- City: Krasnoyarsk, Russia
- League: Russian Bandy Super League
- Founded: 1934; 92 years ago
- Home arena: Yenisey Stadium
- Head coach: Alexey Scheglov
- Website: Official website
Home colours	Away colours

Yenisey (Russian: Енисе́й) is a bandy club from Krasnoyarsk, Russia. It participates in the Russian Bandy Super League, the highest tier of Russian bandy. Yenisey has historically been a successful club, having won the national championship sixteen times, the last in 2021, and the Bandy World Cup in 1982, 1984, 2011 and 2015 and been runners-up in 1983, 1985 and 2000.

After the 2011/12 season, Sergey Lomanov Jr. was named the best player of the national championship.

In 2017, former mayor of Krasnoyarsk, Pyotr Pimashkov, became the new club president.

During the period when Yenisey Stadium was being rebuilt to become an indoor arena, Lokomotiv Stadium was the temporary home arena. In December 2018 the new indoor arena was opened.

== Squad ==
As of 9 December 2021

Note: Flags indicate national team as defined under FIB eligibility rules. Players may hold more than one non-FIB nationality.

No.	Pos.	Nation	Player
13	DF	(Russia) RUS	Vadim Vasilyev
6	MF	(Russia) RUS	Egor Schetinin
7	FW	(Russia) RUS	Sergey Lomanov
8	FW	(Russia) RUS	Ivan Shevtsov
17	MF	(Russia) RUS	Egor Dashkov
19	FW	(Russia) RUS	Marat Sharipov
21	GK	(Russia) RUS	Artyom Dranichnikov
22	DF	(Russia) RUS	Yakov Kolenko
24	MF	(Russia) RUS	Timofei Beznosov
25	FW	(Russia) RUS	Dmitry Barbakov
27	GK	(Russia) RUS	Mikhail Shilyaev

No.	Pos.	Nation	Player
31	GK	(Russia) RUS	Alexey Leskov
33	MF	(Russia) RUS	Denis Kriushenkov
34	FW	(Russia) RUS	Danil Belokrenitsky
44	MF	(Russia) RUS	Roman Shokhov
54	DF	(Russia) RUS	Nikolay Konkov
91	DF	(Russia) RUS	Artyom Akhmetzyanov
92	MF	(Russia) RUS	Dmitry Makarov
95	FW	(Russia) RUS	Igor Seryodkin
96	GK	(Russia) RUS	Dionisy Shutov
97	FW	(Russia) RUS	Semyon Chupin
99	MF	(Russia) RUS	Ilya Lopatin

== Honours ==
=== Domestic ===
- Soviet/Russian Champions:
  - Winners (16): 1980, 1981, 1982, 1983, 1984, 1985, 1986, 1987, 1988, 1989, 1991, 2001, 2014, 2015, 2016, 2021
  - Runners-up (5): 1990, 1999, 2000, 2003, 2018
- Soviet/Russian Cup:
  - Winners (4): 1984, 1997, 1998, 1999
  - Runners-up (9): 1985, 1990, 1992, 2004, 2008, 2009, 2014, 2016, 2017

=== International ===
- World Cup:
  - Winners (4): 1982, 1984, 2011, 2015
  - Runners-up (5): 1983, 1985, 2000, 2012, 2017
- European Cup:
  - Winners (7): 1980, 1983, 1986, 1987, 1988, 1989, 2001
  - Runners-up (5): 1981, 1982, 1984, 1985, 1991

== Yenisey-2 ==
Yenisey's second team Yenisey-2 plays in the Russian Bandy Supreme League, the second tier of Russian bandy.
