= Kuzbass Kemerovo (bandy) =

Kuzbass
- City: Kemerovo, Russia
- League: Russian Bandy Super League
- Founded: 1948; 78 years ago
- Home arena: Khimik Stadium
- President: Yuriy Deryabin
- Head coach: Maximov Ivan Ivanovich
- Captain: Yanis Befus
- Website: https://bandykuzbass.ru/
| Home colours | Away colours |

KhK Kuzbass (Russian: ХК Кузбасс) is a professional bandy club from Kemerovo, Russia, established in 1948. It plays in the Russian Bandy Super League, the top division of Russian bandy. The home games are played at Khimik Stadium in Kemerovo. While during the 2016–17 season, the indoor arena was their base, 2017–18 it will be Khimik again. The club colours are dark orange, white and black and the club logo also includes the arms of Kemerovo.

It was founded in 1948 as Shakhtyor and played in the top division from 1955. The club changed its name to Kuzbass in 1972.

== Honours ==
=== Domestic ===
- Russian Champions:
  - Runners-up (4): 2004, 2005, 2006, 2009
  - Winners (2): 2023, 2024

==== Cup ====
- Russian Bandy Cup:
  - Winners (5): 2001, 2003, 2007, 2023, 2024

== See also ==
- Category:Kuzbass Kemerovo players
