= 2026–27 Russian Bandy Super League =

2026-27 Russian Bandy Super League
- League: Russian Bandy Super League
- Sport: Bandy
- Defending champions: Dynamo (2025/26)
- Duration: November 7, 2026 - February 6, 2027
- Games: 132
- Teams: 12

Seasons
- ← 2025/26 2027/28 →

The 2026/27 Russian Bandy Super League is the 35th season of the present highest Russian men's bandy top division, Russian Bandy Super League.

The season started on November 7, 2026 with games between SKA-Neftyanik vs Rodina, Baikalskiye Sokoly vs SKA-Uralsky Trubnik, and Yenisey vs Sayany, and ends on February 6, 2027 after the final determines the league winner.

The season started with the Kuzbass Cup, a pre-season trophy. Five teams (SKA-Neftyanik, SKA-Uralsky Trubnik, Yenisey, Kuzbass and Kuzbass-2) participated in shortened bandy games (halves were 35 minutes instead of 45) with eachother and Kuzbass won it, defeating SKA-Neftyanik 4:3.

The Russian Cup started on 14 September and ended on 11 October 2026. It was played in a group stage format, where Dynamo and SKA-Neftyanik qualified to the finale, where SKA-Neftyanik won 7:5.

The Russian Super Cup was played on October 22 between Dynamo and SKA-Neftyanik, the previous league champions and the Russian Cup winners respectfully. SKA-Neftyanik defeated Dynamo 9:3, completing the double.

The 2026-27 season's first transfer window (August - November 7, 2026) was tense, as many opportunities were open. Baikalskiye Sokoly were promoted back to the Super League, and most of their squad rejoined them, along with younger players. SKA-Neftyanik and Uralsky Trubnik made decent signings after doing decently in the season, while Dynamo, Kuzbass and Yenisey were rebuilding their squads after a subpar season. Sayany, Volga and Sibselmash had lots of players leave them with none joining. The recently-relegated Start suffered the most, as 10 players left the club, not wanting to play in the 2nd division. Rodina was pretty inactive in the transfer market, and Ak Bars-Raketa did not make any moves due to the club breaking ties with the Dynamo Sports Club, having their club renamed from Ak Bars-Dynamo Kazan to Ak Bars-Raketa after the previous season.

== Teams ==
As of 22 November 2026:

2026/27 Russian Bandy Super League
№	Team	Location	Stadium	Wins	Draws	Losses	Points
1	Rodina	Kirov	Rodina Stadium	2	0	3	4
2	Dynamo	Moscow	Ice Palace Krylatskoye	3	0	2	6
3	Yenisey	Krasnoyarsk	Arena Yenisey	3	1	1	7
4	SKA-Neftyanik	Khabarovsk	Arena Yerofey	5	0	0	10
5	Sibselmash	Novosibirsk	Sibselmash Stadium	0	0	5	0
6	Volga	Ulyanovsk	Volga-Sport-Arena	2	0	3	4
7	SKA-Uralsky Trubnik	Pervouralsk (represents Sverdlovsk Oblast)	Khrompik Stadium	1	0	4	2
8	Vodnik	Arkhangelsk	Trud Stadium	3	0	2	6
9	Sayany	Abakan	Sayany Stadium	0	1	4	1
10	Kuzbass	Kemerovo	Khimik Stadium	5	0	0	10
11	Baikalskiye Sokoly	Irkutsk	Ice Palace Baikal	5	0	0	10
12	Ak Bars-Raketa	Kazan	Raketa Stadium	0	0	5	0
