= 2007 Bandy World Championship =

Tournament details
- Host country: Russia
- City: Kemerovo
- Venues: 2
- Dates: 28 January – 4 February
- Teams: 12

Final positions
- Champions: Russia
- Runners-up: Sweden
- Third place: Finland
- Fourth place: Kazakhstan

The 2007 Bandy World Championship was held in Kemerovo, Russia from 27 January to 4 February. Men's national teams from 12 countries participated in the 2007 tournament: Belarus, Finland, Kazakhstan, Norway, Russia, Sweden (group A) and Estonia, Hungary, Latvia, Mongolia, the Netherlands and the United States (group B). Canada was initially also supposed to take part in the tournament, but withdrew so Latvia took its place. Belarus retained their place in group A by beating the United States in a playoff at the end of the previous tournament held in 2006. Russia won the World Cup for the fourth time in its history. Belarus retained their place in Group A after defeating Group B champions the United States.

== Participating teams ==
=== Division A ===
- Belarus
- Finland
- Kazakhstan
- Norway
- Russia
- Sweden

=== Division B ===
- Estonia
- Hungary
- Latvia
- Mongolia
- Netherlands
- United States

== Division A ==
=== Preliminary round ===
| Pos | Team | Pld | W | D | L | GF | GA | GD | Pts | Group stage result |
|---|---|---|---|---|---|---|---|---|---|---|
| 1 | Russia (H) | 5 | 4 | 1 | 0 | 70 | 14 | +56 | 9 | Advance to Knockout stage |
| 2 | Finland | 5 | 4 | 0 | 1 | 34 | 20 | +14 | 8 | Advance to Knockout stage |
| 3 | Sweden | 5 | 3 | 1 | 1 | 56 | 21 | +35 | 7 | Advance to Knockout stage |
| 4 | Kazakhstan | 5 | 2 | 0 | 3 | 33 | 37 | −4 | 4 | Advance to Knockout stage |
| 5 | Norway | 5 | 1 | 0 | 4 | 23 | 55 | −32 | 2 | |
| 6 | Belarus | 5 | 0 | 0 | 5 | 11 | 80 | −69 | 0 | Qualification to Relegation playoffs |

Updated to match(es) played on completed. Source:
(H) Hosts
28 January 2007

| Finland | 14–1 | Belarus |

Khimik Stadium, Kemerovo
28 January 2007

| Kazakhstan | 1–8 | Sweden |

Khimik Stadium, Kemerovo
28 January 2007

| Russia | 18–2 | Norway |

Khimik Stadium, Kemerovo
29 January 2007

| Sweden | 21–5 | Belarus |

Khimik Stadium, Kemerovo
29 January 2007

| Norway | 4–11 | Kazakhstan |

Khimik Stadium, Kemerovo
29 January 2007

| Finland | 5–9 | Russia |

Khimik Stadium, Kemerovo
30 January 2007

| Belarus | 1–8 | Norway |

Khimik Stadium, Kemerovo
30 January 2007

| Kazakhstan | 3–17 | Russia |

Khimik Stadium, Kemerovo
30 January 2007

| Sweden | 4–5 | Finland |

Khimik Stadium, Kemerovo
31 January 2007

| Belarus | 3–14 | Kazakhstan |

Khimik Stadium, Kemerovo
31 January 2007

| Norway | 2–5 | Finland |

Khimik Stadium, Kemerovo
31 January 2007

| Sweden | 3–3 | Russia |

Khimik Stadium, Kemerovo
2 February 2007

| Sweden | 20–7 | Norway |

Khimik Stadium, Kemerovo
2 February 2007

| Finland | 5–4 | Kazakhstan |

Khimik Stadium, Kemerovo
2 February 2007

| Russia | 23–1 | Belarus |

Khimik Stadium, Kemerovo

=== Knockout stage ===
Semi-finals
3 February – Kemerovo
Russia | 16
Kazakhstan | 3
3 February – Kemerovo
Finland | 2(2)
Sweden | 2(3)

Final
4 February – Kemerovo
Russia | 3
Sweden | 1
Third place
4 February – Kemerovo
Kazakhstan | 4(4)
Finland | 4(5)

==== Semi-finals ====
3 February 2007

| Russia | 16–3 | Kazakhstan |

Khimik Stadium, Kemerovo
3 February 2007

| Finland | 2–3 (sd) | Sweden |

Khimik Stadium, Kemerovo

==== Third place play-off ====
4 February 2007

| Kazakhstan | 4–5 (sd) | Finland |

Khimik Stadium, Kemerovo

==== Final ====
4 February 2007

| Russia | 3–1 | Sweden |

Khimik Stadium, Kemerovo

=== Statistics ===
==== Goalscorers ====
19 goals

- (Russia) Sergey Obukhov

16 goals

- (Sweden) David Karlsson

14 goals

- (Sweden) Daniel Andersson

13 goals

- (Russia) Yevgeny Ivanushkin
- (Finland) Sami Laakkonen
- (Russia) Pavel Ryazantsev

12 goals

- (Kazakhstan) Vyacheslav Bronnikov

11 goals

- (Russia) Sergey Lomanov, Jr.

9 goals

- (Russia) Denis Kriushenkov

7 goals

- (Kazakhstan) Sergey Tarasov

6 goals

- (Sweden) Marcus Bergwall
- (Sweden) Jonas Edling
- (Russia) Ivan Maksimov

5 goals

- (Finland) Ville Aaltonen
- (Sweden) Johan Andersson
- (Belarus) Sergey Chernetsky
- (Norway) Kjetil Johansen
- (Norway) Christer Lystad
- (Kazakhstan) Andrey Morikov
- (Russia) Mikhail Sveshnikov

4 goals

- (Finland) Mikko Aarni
- (Russia) Maksim Chermnykh
- (Kazakhstan) Denis In-Fa-Lin
- (Finland) Rasmus Lindqvist
- (Norway) Thomas Moen
- (Finland) Mika Mutikainen

3 goals

- (Sweden) Stefan Erixon
- (Norway) Påhl Hanssen
- (Finland) Samuli Niskanen
- (Belarus) Evgenij Sviridov
- (Belarus) Anton Zybarev

2 goals

- (Norway) Marius Austad
- (Sweden) Olov Englund
- (Sweden) Per Hellmyrs
- (Kazakhstan) Rauan Isaliev
- (Sweden) Daniel Mossberg
- (Sweden) Magnus Muhrén
- (Kazakhstan) Vladislav Novozhilov
- (Finland) Pekka Rintala
- (Russia) Dmitry Savelyev (bandy player)
- (Russia) Dmitry Starikov
- (Belarus) Yury Stepochkin
- (Russia) Aleksandr Tyukavin
- (Russia) Yury Vikulin
- (Kazakhstan) Dmitrij Zavidovskij
- (Finland) Igor Zolotarev

1 goal

- (Sweden) Hans Andersson
- (Norway) Kjetil Bergh
- (Belarus) Vadim Bogdanovich
- (Belarus) Artem Botvenkov
- (Kazakhstan) Mikhail Dobrynin
- (Kazakhstan) Aleksandr Dryagin
- (Finland) Antti Ekman
- (Norway) Stian Holmen-Jensen
- (Finland) Kimmo Huotelin
- (Finland) Petteri Lampinen
- (Norway) Jan Magnus Olaisen
- (Finland) Tommi Österberg
- (Sweden) Anders Östling
- (Russia) Yury Pogrebnoy
- (Belarus) Roman Poloskin
- (Kazakhstan) Denis Slautin
- (Belarus) Mikhail Tarasenko
- (Norway) Christian Waaler
- (Kazakhstan) Alexei Zagarskikh
- (Kazakhstan) Alexej Zolotarev

== Division B ==
All Division B games 2x30 minute halves apart from A6-B1 playoff which is of regular 2x45 minute halves

=== Preliminary round ===
| Pos | Team | Pld | W | D | L | GF | GA | GD | Pts |
|---|---|---|---|---|---|---|---|---|---|
| 1 | United States | 5 | 5 | 0 | 0 | 51 | 5 | +46 | 10 |
| 2 | Latvia | 5 | 4 | 0 | 1 | 26 | 8 | +18 | 8 |
| 3 | Hungary | 5 | 2 | 1 | 2 | 11 | 25 | −14 | 5 |
| 4 | Netherlands | 5 | 1 | 1 | 3 | 10 | 23 | −13 | 3 |
| 5 | Mongolia | 5 | 0 | 2 | 3 | 4 | 22 | −18 | 2 |
| 6 | Estonia | 5 | 1 | 0 | 4 | 11 | 30 | −19 | 2 |

- 28 January

Netherlands – USA 0–11
Latvia – Mongolia 5–0
Estonia – Hungary 2–4
Netherlands – Mongolia 2–2

- 29 January

Hungary – Latvia 0–7
USA – Mongolia 8–0
Netherlands – Estonia 5–1
USA – Hungary 12–2

- 30 January

Estonia – Mongolia 5–0
USA – Latvia 6–1
Netherlands – Hungary 2–3
Estonia – Latvia 1–7

- 31 January

USA – Estonia 14–2
Netherlands – Latvia 1–6
Hungary – Mongolia 2–2

=== Final round ===
- 1 February and 2 February

Estonia – Mongolia 1–4, 2–2
Netherlands – Hungary 3–1, 4–3
Latvia – USA 0–5, 6–2

=== Division A play-off ===
Belarus – USA 9–1

== See also ==
- Bandy World Championship
