= 2025–26 Russian Bandy Super League =

2025/26 Russian Bandy Super League
- League: Russian Bandy Super League
- Sport: Bandy
- Defending champions: Kuzbass (2024/25)
- Duration: November 12, 2025 - March 21, 2026
- Games: 132
- Teams: 12
- Season champions: Dynamo
- Finals venue: Yerofey Arena

Seasons
- ← 2024/25 2026/27 →

The 2025/26 Russian Bandy Super League was the 34th season of the current highest tier Russian men's bandy top division, the Russian Bandy Super League.

The season started on November 12, 2025 with 4 games, and finished on March 21, 2026 with the final between SKA-Neftyanik and Dynamo, where Dynamo won 6:8.

Dynamo completed the treble that season, winning the Russian Cup 9:3 against Uralsky Trubnik and winning the Super Cup 4:3 against Kuzbass, the defending champions.

== Teams ==
№	Team	Location	Wins	Draws	Losses	Points
1	SKA-Neftyanik	Khabarovsk	21	0	1	63
2	Dynamo	Moscow	16	3	3	51
3	Kuzbass	Kemerovo	16	2	4	50
4	Vodnik	Arkhangelsk	14	5	3	47
5	SKA-Uralsky Trubnik	Pervouralsk	13	0	9	39
6	Start	Nizhny Novgorod	11	2	9	35
7	Yenisey	Krasnoyarsk	10	0	12	30
8	Rodina	Kirov	8	0	14	24
9	Volga	Ulyanovsk	7	3	12	24
10	Sibselmash	Novosibirsk	3	3	16	12
11	Ak Bars-Dynamo Kazan	Kazan	2	1	19	7
12	Sayany	Abakan	1	1	20	4
