= Sergey Lomanov =

Sergey Lomanov may refer to:

- Sergey Lomanov, Sr. (born 1957), Russian bandy player
- Sergey Lomanov, Jr. (born 1980), Russian bandy player
