= Rodina Stadium =

Rodina Stadium may refer to:

- Rodina Stadium (Khimki), home of FC Khimki football club in Moscow Oblast, Russia
- Rodina Stadium (Kirov), home of Rodina Kirov bandy club in Kirov Oblast, Russia
