= Anwar Hared =

Canadian bandy player (born 1996)

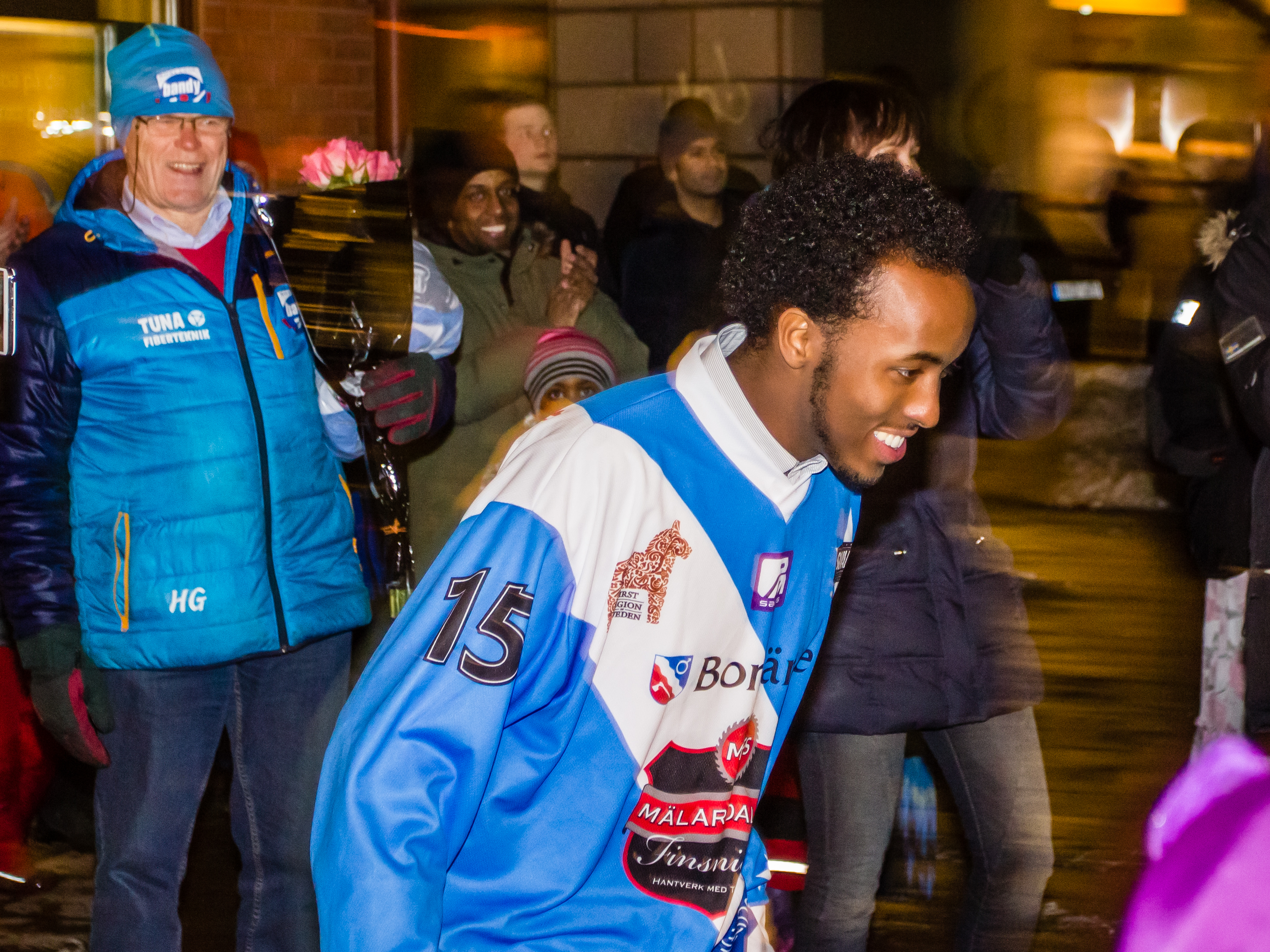
- Anwar Hared at celebration reception in Borlänge, Sweden after World Championships 2014
- Born: November 17, 1996 (age 29)

Anwar Hared (born November 17, 1996) is a Somali-Canadian ice hockey and bandy player. He played in the 2014 Bandy World Championship and scored the first ever goal for the Somalia team, scoring two in total goals.

Hared was also included in the Somalia team which competed at the 2015 Bandy World Championship in Khabarovsk. Somalia lost the first game, to the Netherlands, 0–18. However, being interviewed after the game, he mentioned that he was disappointed with the result, but the game itself was pleasant. He scored a goal in the game against China, becoming the only Somali player to score in two World Championships.

Hared immigrated with his family to Canada and lived there for more than 15 years. He learned about Somalia national bandy team while browsing the internet, and after getting specific training for bandy on roller skates for three months, and on skates for a further two months, he joined the team. He lives in Newmarket and played ice hockey.
