= Sayany =

Sayany may refer to

- Sayan Mountains
- the former name of Sayany-Khakassia, a bandy club in Russia
- 4189 Sayany, a minor planet
