= Maksim Ishkeldin =

Russian bandy player (1990–2021)

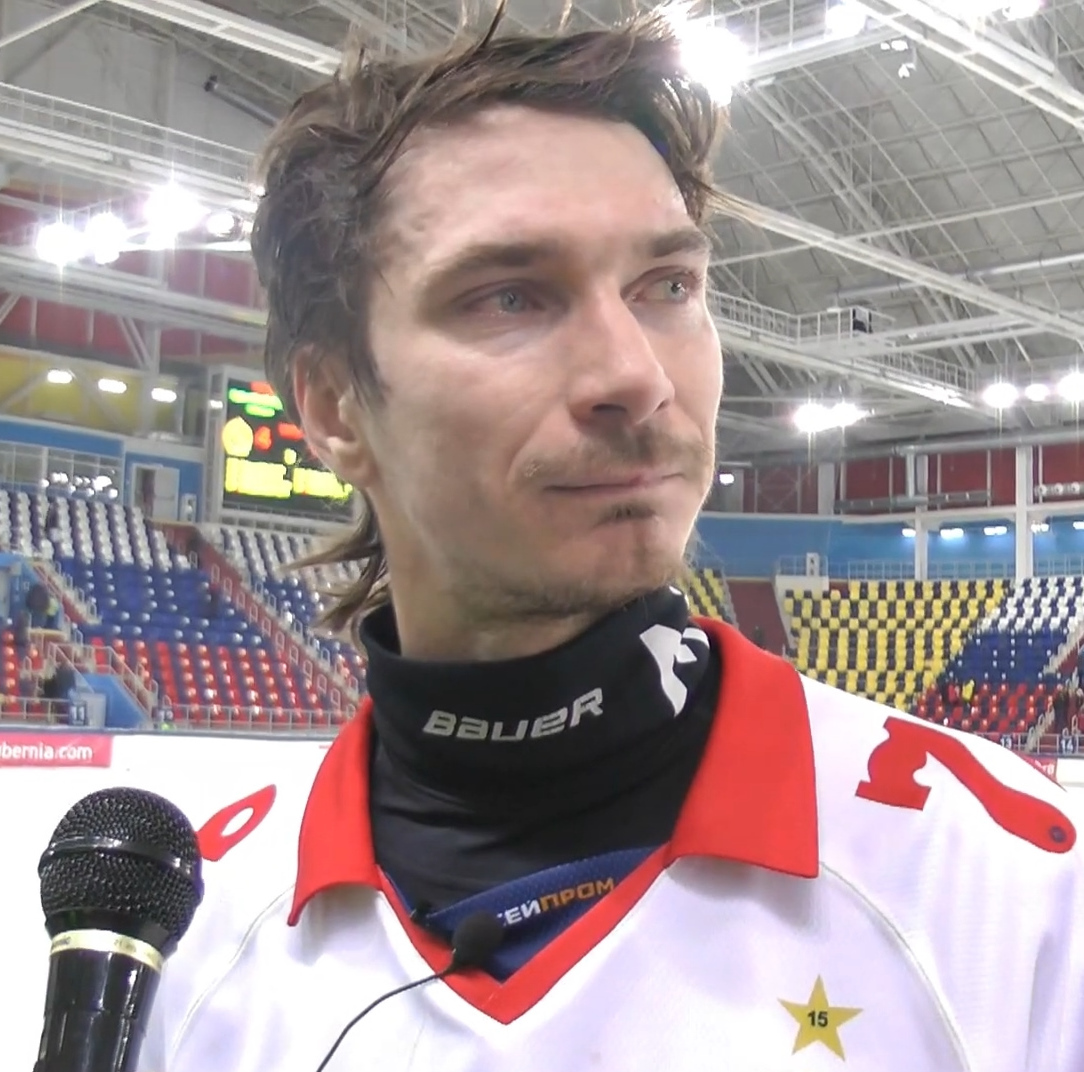
- Ishkeldin in February 2021

Personal information
- Full name: Maksim Vitalyevich Ishkeldin
- Date of birth: 22 June 1990
- Place of birth: Novosibirsk, Russian SFSR, Soviet Union
- Date of death: 5 June 2021 (aged 30)
- Place of death: Novosibirsk, Russia

Senior career*
Years	Team	Apps^{†}	(Gls)^{†}
2006–2010	Sibselmash		
2010–2015	Zorky		
2015–2020	SKA-Neftyanik		
2020–2021	Yenisey Krasnoyarsk Bandy Club		
Medal record
Men's bandy
Representing Russia
World Championships
Gold medal – first place	2013 Sweden/Norway	Team
Gold medal – first place	2014 Irkutsk	Team
Gold medal – first place	2015 Khabarovsk	Team
Gold medal – first place	2016 Ulyanovsk	Team
Gold medal – first place	2018 Khabarovsk	Team
Gold medal – first place	2019 Vänersborg	Team
Silver medal – second place	2012 Almaty	Team
Silver medal – second place	2017 Sandviken	Team
- * Senior club appearances and goals counted for the domestic league only. † Appearances (Goals).

Maksim Vitalyevich Ishkeldin (Russian: Максим Витальевич Ишкельдин; 22 June 1990 – 5 June 2021) was a Russian professional bandy player. He played for the Yenisey Krasnoyarsk Bandy Club from 2020, and previously for the Novosibirsk Sibselmash (2006–2010) and the Krasnogorsk Zorky (2010–2015) and the SKA-Neftyanik (2015–2020) and was part of the Russia national bandy team in world championship competitions. After the 2017–18 season he was elected the best player in the Russian Super League, as well as after the 2018–19 season.

On 23 April 2020, Yenisey Krasnoyarsk Bandy Club presented Ishkeldin as their newest player.

== Death ==
Ishkeldin died of a blood clot in his sleep on 5 June 2021.
