= Stroitel Stadium =

Stroitel Stadium may refer to

- Stroitel Stadium (Dimitrovgrad), Russia
- Stroitel Stadium (Murmansk), Russia
- Stroitel Stadium (Ufa), Russia
- Stroitel Stadium (Salavat), Russia
- Anatoly Stepanov Stadium in (Tolyatti), Russia (formerly the Stroitel Stadium)
- Stroitel Stadium (Soligorsk), Belarus
