= Cheremshan Dimitrovgrad =

Cheremshan
- City: Dimitrovgrad, Russia
- Founded: 1966; 59 years ago
- Home arena: Stroitel Stadium

Cheremshan (Russian: Черемшан) is a bandy club in Dimitrovgrad, Russia. It has been playing in the Supreme League. The home ice of the club was Stadium Stroitel in Dimitrovgrad, where artificial ice was planned in time for the 2016 Bandy World Championship., but did not happen.
