= Trud Stadium (Ulyanovsk) =

Sports venue in Ulyanovsk, Russia

Coordinates: 54.3181°N 48.3943°E

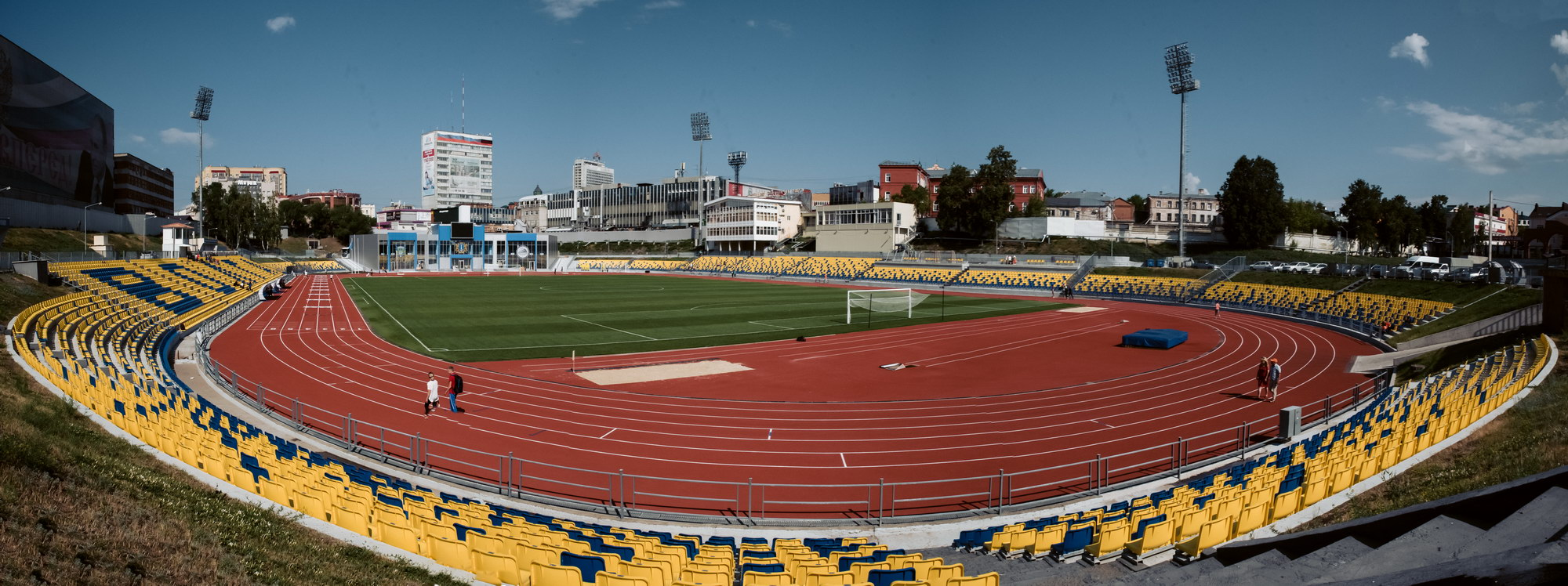
Trud in the football season

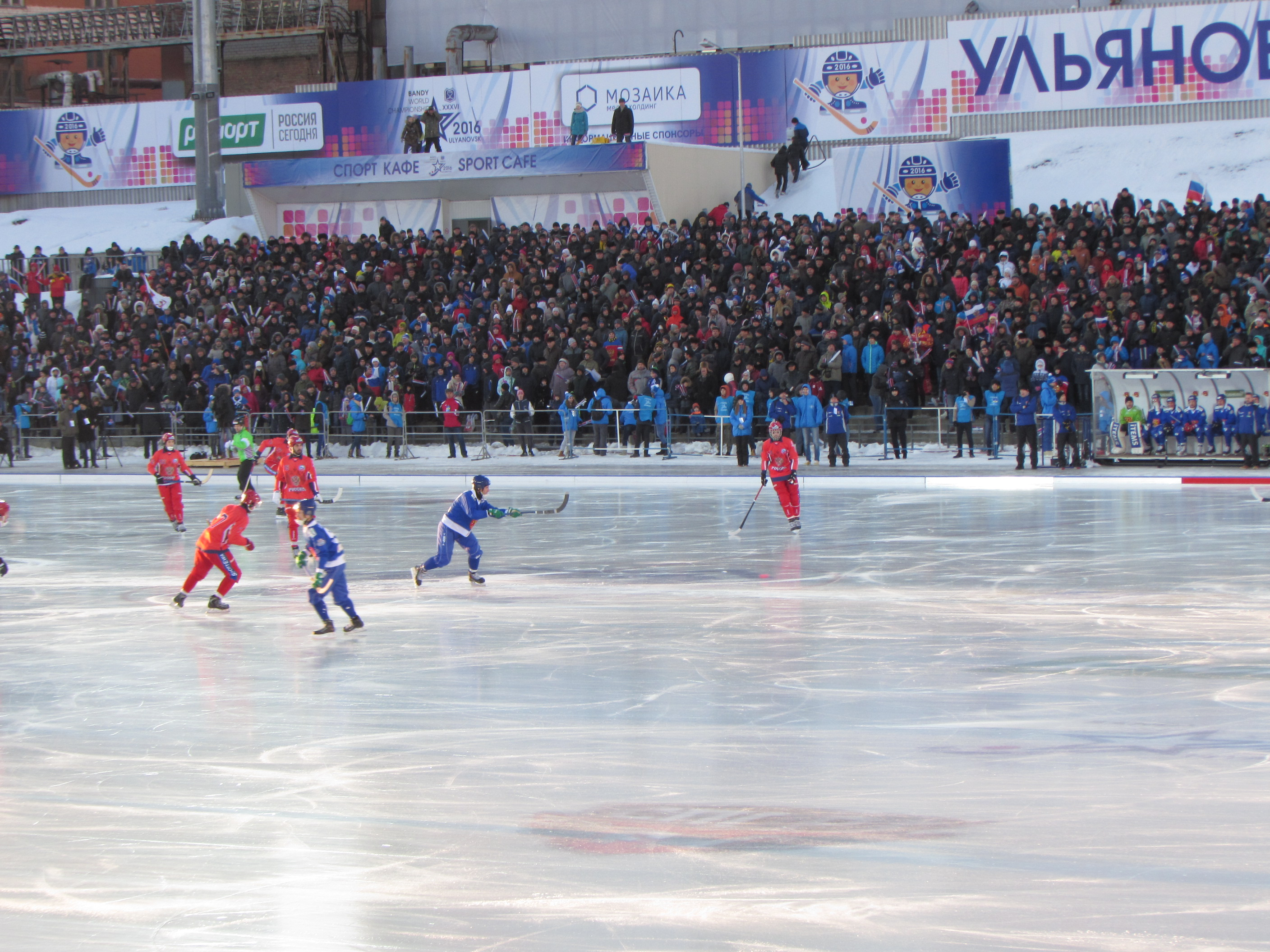
The Bandy World Championship 2016 final

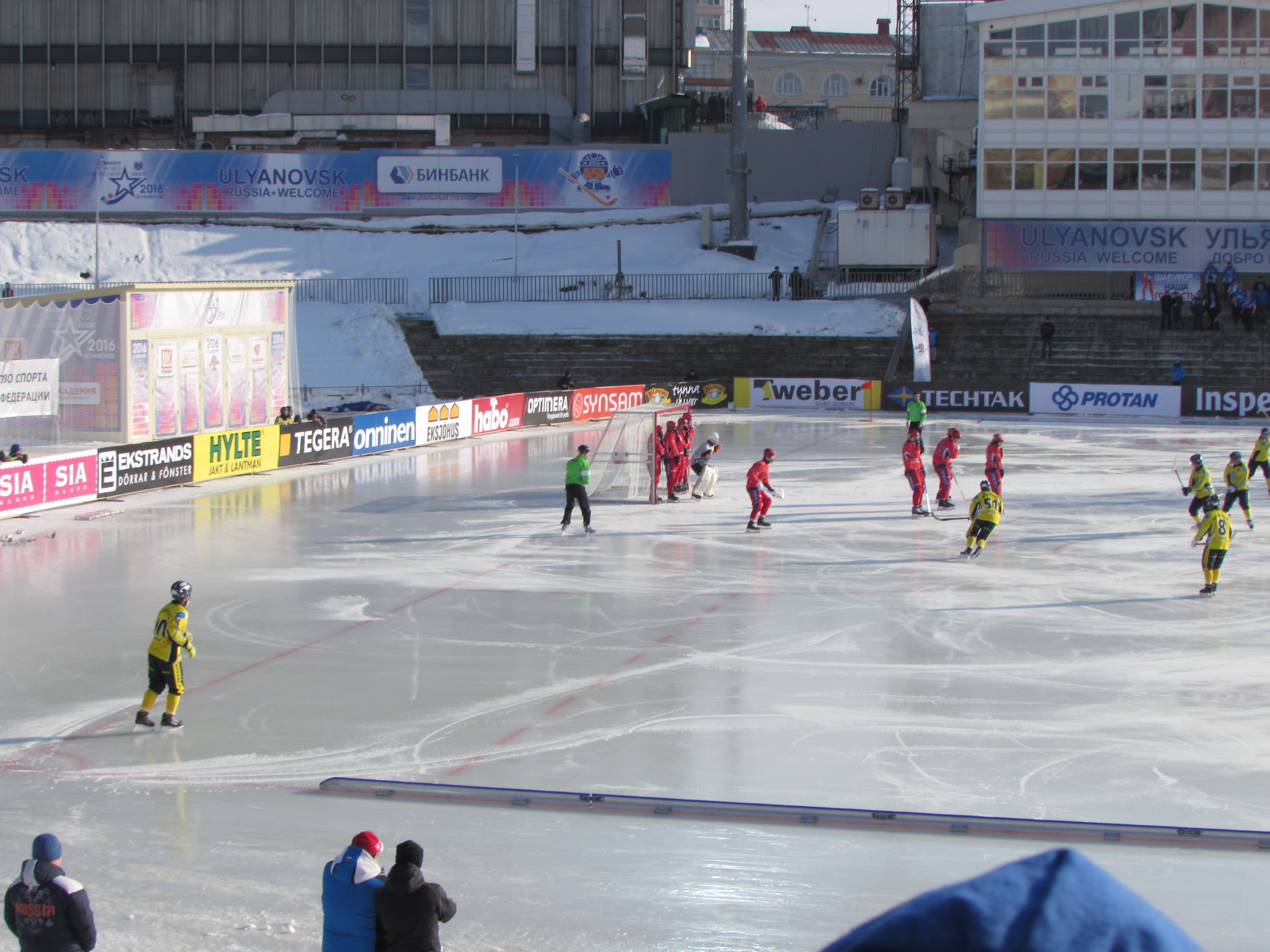
Kazakhstan-Russia, semifinal at the World Championship 2016

Trud Stadium is a bandy arena in Ulyanovsk, Russia. It is the home arena of bandy club Volga-SDYuSShOR, which is playing in the second-tier Russian Bandy Supreme League. With a higher spectator capacity than the more modern Volga-Sport-Arena in the same city, the semi-final Russia participated in and the final of the 2016 Bandy World Championship were played at Trud.

Trud holds 15,000 seated spectators. The total area of the stadium is 40,711 m^{2} with an ice of 8,600 m^{2} or 100x65 m playing field.

During the summer, the arena is used by an association football team FC Volga Ulyanovsk.

Events and tenants
| Preceded by Arena Yerofey; Khabarovsk | Bandy World Championship; Final Venue; 2016 | Succeeded by Göransson Arena; Sandviken |
