= Somali National Bandy Association =

Somali National Bandy Association is the governing body for the winter team sports of bandy and rink bandy for Somalia. The organization was founded in 2013 and is formally a part of the Somali Olympic Committee. The same year, the Somalia national bandy team became the first squad from Africa to join the Federation of International Bandy. The team consists of Somali nationals, mostly living in Sweden. It played in the 2014 Bandy World Championship.

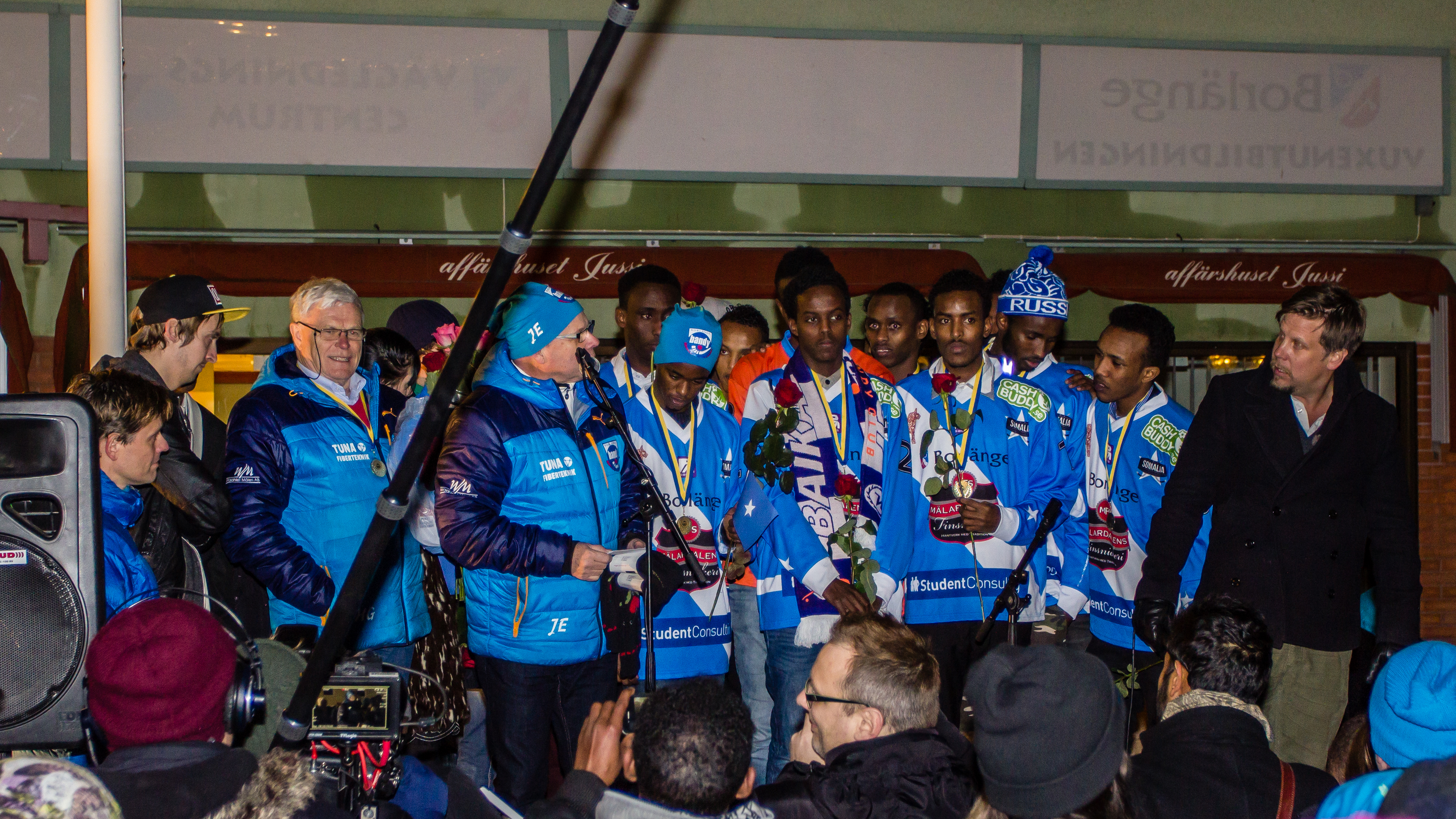
Somalia national bandy team in Borlänge, 2014
