= Volga-SDYuSShOR =

- City: Ulyanovsk, Russia
- Home arena: Trud Stadium

Volga-SDYuSShOR (Russian: Волга-СДЮСШОР) is a bandy club in Ulyanovsk, Russia, belonging to sports school Specialized Children and Youth Sports Schools of the Olympic Reserve, SDYuSShOR (Russian: СДЮСШОР) and under the patronage of professional bandy club Volga Ulyanovsk.

The club is playing in the Russian Bandy Supreme League, the second tier of Russian bandy. The home games are played at Trud Stadium in Ulyanovsk. The club logo is mostly blue and white.
