= Pyotr Zakharov =

Russian professional bandy player (born 1979)

Personal information
- Full name: Pyotr Vadimovich Zakharov
- Date of birth: 27 July 1979 (age 45)

Senior career*
Years	Team	Apps^{†}	(Gls)^{†}
- Volga Ulyanovsk
Medal record
Men's bandy
Representing Russia
World Championships
Gold medal – first place	2014 Irkutsk	Team
Gold medal – first place	2016 Ulyanovsk	Team
- * Senior club appearances and goals counted for the domestic league only. † Appearances (Goals).

Pyotr Vadimovich Zakharov (Russian: Пётр Вадимович Захаров; born 27 July 1979) is a Russian professional bandy player. He has been playing for the Volga Ulyanovsk since 2015 and has been part of the Russia national bandy team in many world championship competitions.
