= Khimik Stadium (Kemerovo) =

Stadium in Kemerovo used by the local hockey team "Kuzbass"

- Interactive map of Khimik Stadium
- Location: Kemerovo, Russia
- Coordinates: 55°21′18″N 86°04′13″E
- Capacity: 17,000 (since 2018)

Construction
- Opened: 1978

Tenant
- Kuzbass

Khimik Stadion is a multi-use stadium in Kemerovo, Russia. It is currently used mostly for football and bandy matches. The stadium had a capacity of 32,000 people, since 2018 it has been 17,000. It is the home ground for bandy club Kuzbass.

Events and tenants
Preceded by Zinkensdamms IP; Stockholm	Bandy World Championship; Final Venue; 2007	Succeeded by Olympic Stadium; Moscow
