= Commonwealth of Independent States national bandy team =

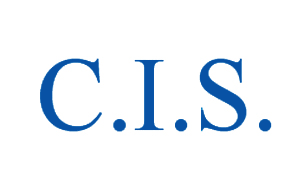
The 1991–1996 provisional flag of the CIS, which was used at events when CIS national sports team played in the early 1990s.

The Commonwealth of Independent States national bandy team was the new name for the Soviet Union national bandy team after the dissolution of the Soviet Union in December 1991.

The team only existed in January and February 1992, playing games which the Soviet Union previously had been booked for. Its last appearance was at the Russian Government Cup 1992 on 28 January – 2 February 1992, where it was also playing against the new Russia national bandy team. Since then, the Commonwealth of Independent States does not have a unified bandy team, as many of the member states of the commonwealth have set up their own national teams.

There was also an equally short-lived youth team for the Commonwealth, taking part in the 1992 Bandy World Championship Y-23.
