= Yevgeny Ivanushkin =

Russian bandy player

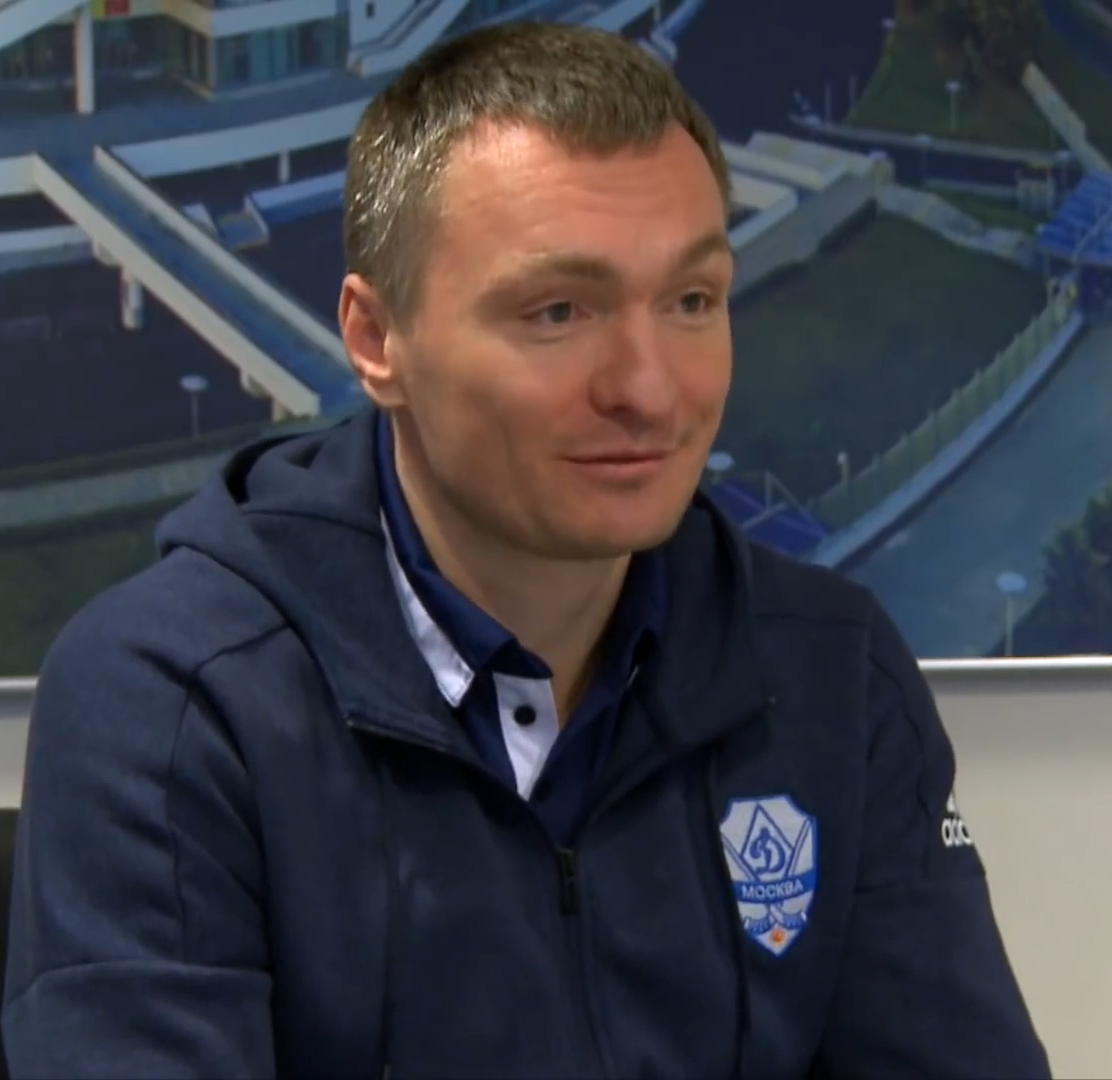
- Ivanushkin in 2019

Personal information
- Full name: Yevgeny Aleksandrovich Ivanushkin
- Date of birth: 26 July 1979 (age 45)
- Place of birth: Krasnoturinsk, Soviet Union
- Playing position: Forward

Club information
- Current team: Dynamo Moscow

Senior career*
Years	Team	Apps^{†}	(Gls)^{†}
1995–2001	Dynamo Mayak		
2001–2004	Sibskana		
2004–2005	Vodnik		
2005–	Dynamo Moscow		
Medal record
Men's bandy
Representing Russia
World Championships
Gold medal – first place	2013 Sweden/Norway	Team
Gold medal – first place	2014 Irkutsk	Team
Gold medal – first place	2016 Ulyanovsk	Team
Silver medal – second place	2017 Sandviken	Team
- * Senior club appearances and goals counted for the domestic league only. † Appearances (Goals).

Yevgeny Aleksandrovich Ivanushkin (Russian: Евгений Александрович Иванушкин; born 26 July 1979 in Krasnoturinsk) is a Russian bandy player who currently plays for Dynamo Moscow and has been part of the Russia national bandy team in many world championship competitions. In 2017 he became the second player, after Sergey Lomanov Jr., to score 1 000 goals in Russian Bandy Super League.

== Career ==
Ivanushkin has played with Mayak, Sibskana-Energiya/Baykal-Energiya, Vodnik Arkhangelsk and Dynamo Moscow.
