= Rossiya Tournament 1986 =

Rossiya Tournament 1986 in bandy was played in Irkutsk in the period 11-16 January 1986, and was won by the Soviet Union. Beside the usual national teams there was also a temporary team representing the Russian Soviet Federative Socialist Republic, the biggest state of the Soviet Union; the regular Russia national team was set up six years later, after the dissolution of the Soviet Union.

The tournament was decided by round-robin results like a group stage.

== Results ==
Team	Pld	W	D	L	GF	GA	GD	Pts
Soviet Union	4	3	0	1	22	6	+16	6
Sweden	4	3	0	1	8	3	+5	6
Finland	4	3	0	1	2	5	−3	6
(Russian Soviet Federative Socialist Republic) Russian SFSR	4	1	0	3	12	14	−2	2
Norway	4	0	0	4	8	29	−21	0

== Sources ==
- Norges herrlandskamper i bandy
- Sverige-Sovjet i bandy
- Rossijaturneringen (in Russian)
