= Trud Stadium (Irkutsk) =

Sports venue in Irkutsk, Russia

Coordinates: 52°16′34″N 104°16′56″E

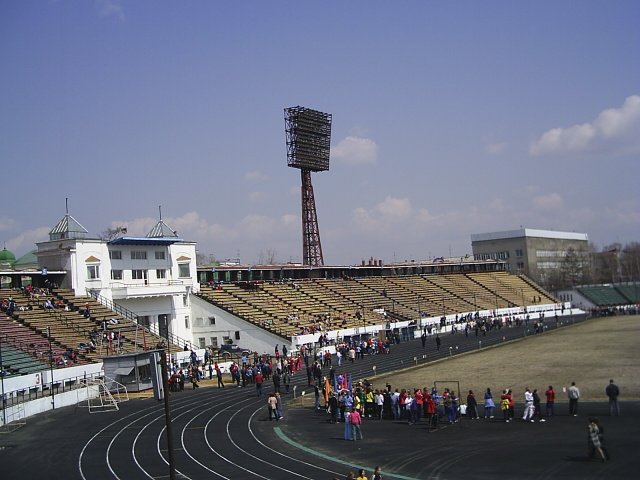
- Interactive map of Trud Stadium
- Location: Lenin Street 48, Irkutsk, Russia
- Capacity: 16,500

Construction
- Opened: 1957

Tenants
- FC Zvezda Irkutsk; FC Zenit Irkutsk; FC Irkutsk

Trud Stadium (Russian: Стадион Труд) is a multi-use stadium in Irkutsk, Russia. It is currently used mostly for football and bandy matches. It was the main venue of the 2014 Bandy World Championship. The stadium holds 16,500 people.

== History ==
"Vanguard" is built on the site burned down the stadium and was originally inherited his title. Construction started in 1951, and completed in 1957. Since the late 1950s, the former stadium "Avangard" was named as "Work".

Events and tenants
Preceded by Arena Vänersborg; Vänersborg	Bandy World Championship; Final Venue; 2014	Succeeded by Arena Yerofey; Khabarovsk
