= 2016 Bandy World Championship =

XXXVIth Bandy World Championship

Tournament details
- Host country: Russia
- Venues: 3 (in 2 host cities)
- Dates: 1–7 February (Division A); 10–14 February (Division B)
- Teams: 8 in Division A and 10 in Division B

Final positions
- Champions: Russia (10th title)
- Runners-up: Finland
- Third place: Sweden
- Fourth place: Kazakhstan

Tournament statistics
- Games played: 22 (Division A); 33 (Division B)
- Scoring leader(s): Division A (Sweden) Christoffer Edlund (Belarus) Andrey Kabanov (14 goals); Division B (Ukraine) Dmitry Koval (20 goals)

Awards
- MVP: (Russia) Sergey Lomanov

Kolobok, the 2016 World Championship mascot.

Bandy World Championship 2016, the XXXVI Bandy World Championship, was held with Ulyanovsk Oblast, Russia, as host region. Most of the games were played at the Volga-Sport-Arena in Ulyanovsk. Because of its higher spectator capacity, the group stage matches between Russia and Sweden and between Russia and Kazakhstan were played at Trud Stadium, which also hosted one semi-final and the final. Some games were played in nearby Dimitrovgrad at Stadium Stroitel.

The Division A tournament was played from 1 February until 7 February 2016, while the Division B tournament took place afterwards, on 10–14 February.

Czech Republic made its debut, while Canada and Ukraine were set to return, thus reaching an all-time high of nineteen participating teams. Canada missed the championships due to domestic competitions, so a total of eighteen countries participated, which is still more than ever before.

The tournament was part of Russian President Vladimir Putin's schedule for 2016, he sent a greeting letter before the tournament and one of congratulation after the victory of the Russian team.

== Participating teams ==
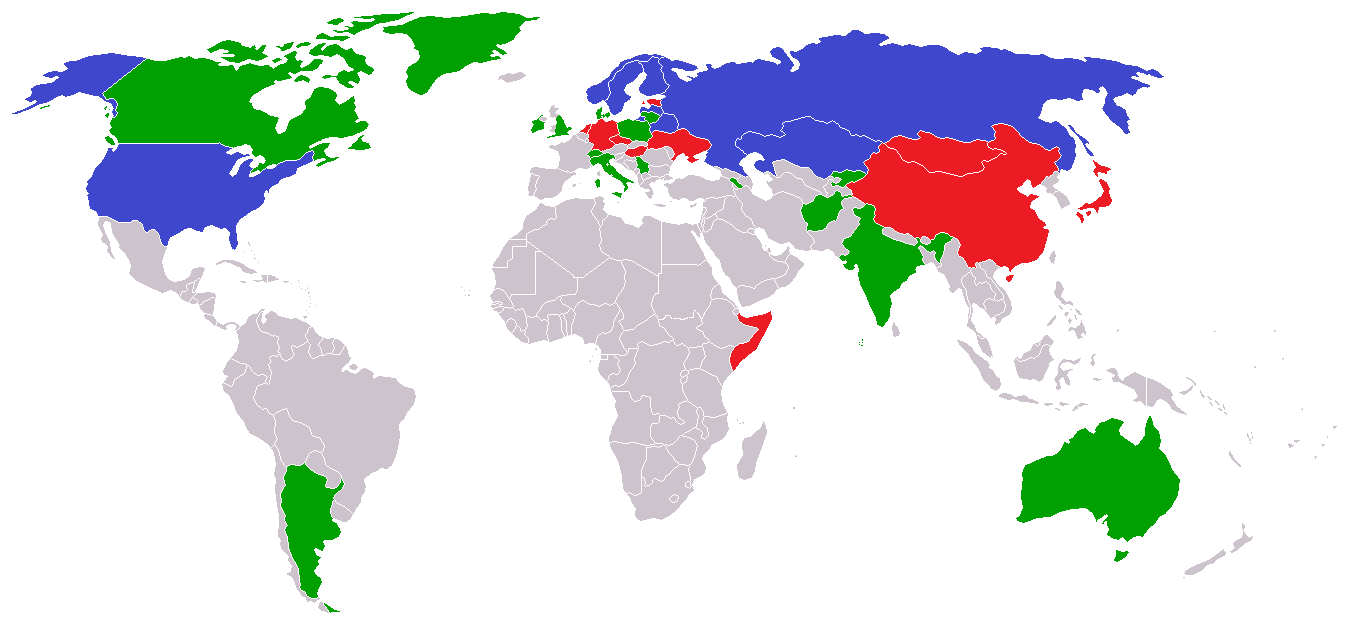
Participating countries in the 2016 Bandy World Championship. Blue: Division A Red: Division B Green: members of the Federation of International Bandy not participating in this year's World Championship

=== Division A ===
- Belarus
- Finland
- Kazakhstan
- Latvia
- Norway
- Russia
- Sweden
- United States

=== Division B ===
- China
- Czech Republic
- Estonia
- Germany
- Hungary
- Japan
- Mongolia
- Netherlands
- Somalia
- Ukraine

== Venues ==
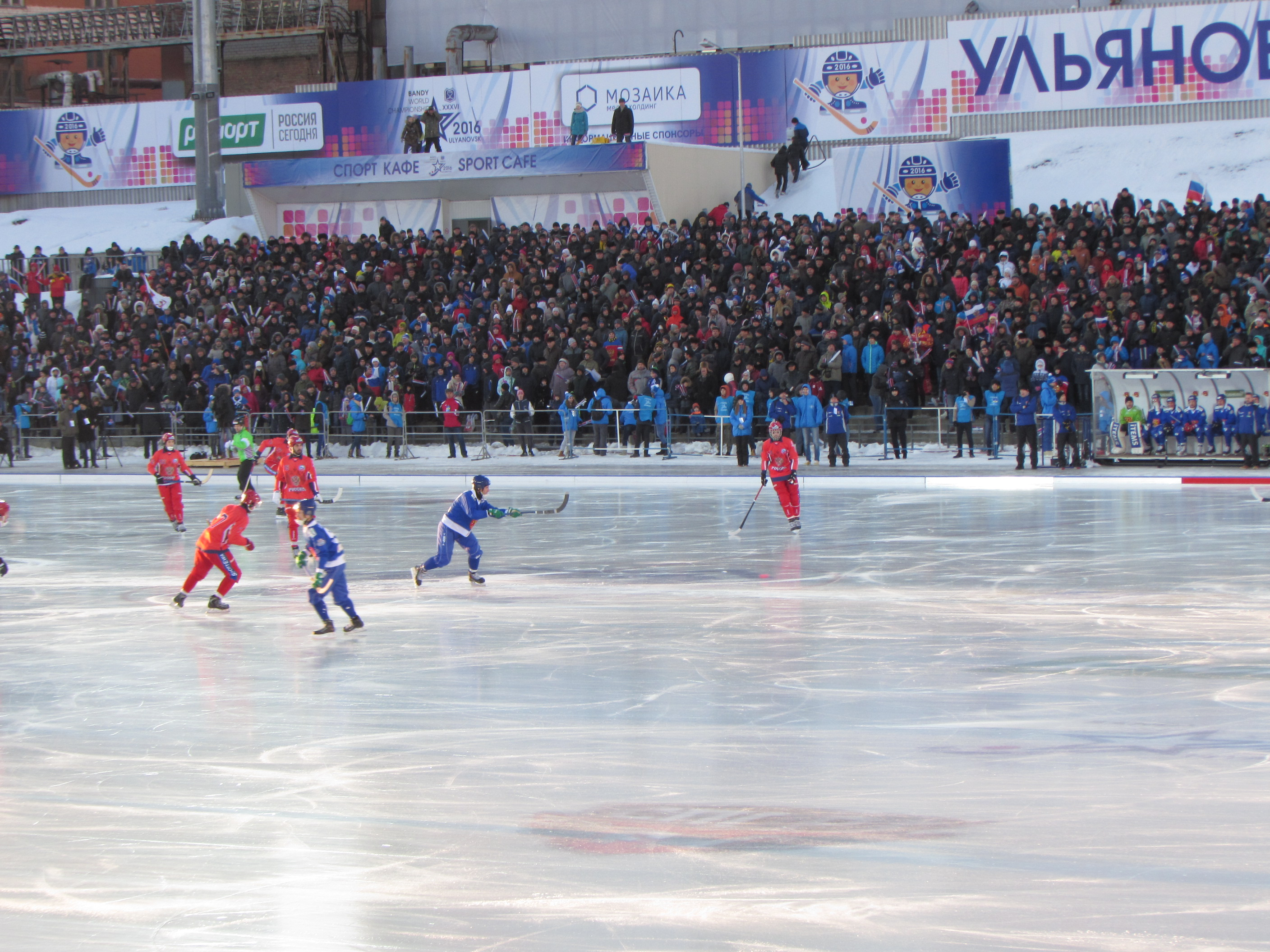
Russia and Finland in the final

Ulyanovsk	Ulyanovsk	Dimitrovgrad
Trud Stadium	Volga-Sport-Arena	Stroitel Stadium
Capacity: 15,000	Capacity: 5,000	
		no image available

Because of the weather conditions and the want to keep the ice at Trud good for the semifinals and the final, the Tuesday 2 February game (game 8) between Russia and Finland and the Wednesday 3 February game (game 12) between Russia and Sweden were moved from the outdoor Trud stadium to the indoor Volga-Sport-Arena.

== Division A ==
After drawn games in the group stage, a penalty shootout is held to determine final placings in the event of teams finishing on equal points

=== Preliminary round ===
==== Group A ====
Pos	Team	Pld	W	D	L	GF	GA	GD	Pts
1	Sweden	3	3	0	0	26	8	+18	6
2	Russia (H)	3	2	0	1	22	9	+13	4
3	Kazakhstan	3	1	0	2	10	24	−14	2
4	Finland	3	0	0	3	7	24	−17	0

(H) Hosts

All times are local (UTC+3).

Game 3
Mon. 1 February 2016
16:00

Sweden	9–1	Finland
J. Andersson 10', 90'; S. Jansson 16', 57'; C. Edlund 24', 89'; A. Westh 47'; E. Säfström 70'; O. Englund 85'	Report	32' M. Rytkönen

Volga-Sport-Arena, Ulyanovsk
Attendance: 2,300
Referee: Nikita Yuklyaevskikh (RUS)
Game 4
Mon. 1 February 2016
19:00

Kazakhstan	1–9	Russia
S. Pochkunov 60'	Report	6', 28', 47' E. Ivanushkin; 17' P. Zakharov; 18' Y. Vikulin; 43', 59' S. Lomanov; 78' I. Larionov; 86' M. Ishkeldin

Trud, Ulyanovsk
Attendance: 6,200
Referee: Petri Kuusela (FIN)
Game 7
Tue. 2 February 2016
16:00

Sweden	11–4	Kazakhstan
P. Hellmyrs 8', 41'; M. Johansson 10'; J. Andersson 13'; J. Löfstedt 28'; C. Edlund 30', 36', 43'; E. Pettersson 45' (p); S. Jansson 58'; D. Berlin 80'	Report	33' L. Bedarev; 65' S. Pochkunov; 68' S. Gorchakov; 76' M. Gavrilenko

Volga-Sport-Arena, Ulyanovsk
Attendance: 893
Referee: Petri Kuusela (FIN)
Game 8
Tue. 2 February 2016
19:00

Russia	10–2	Finland
A. Mirgazov 3', 30', 55'; A. Dzhusoev 15'; Y. Shardakov 27'; M. Ishkeldin 68'; E. Ivanushkin 71', 79'; S. Lomanov 86' (p), 87'	Report	32', 80' J. Liukkonen

~~Trud~~ Volga-Sport-Arena, Ulyanovsk
Attendance: 3,718
Referee: Roland Fager (SWE)
Game 11
Wed. 3 February 2016
16:00

Kazakhstan	5–4	Finland
R. Isaliyev 19'; A. Golubkov 43' (p), 66' (p), 82'; D. Zavidovski 77'	Report	49' J. Rintala; 65' M. Lukkarila; 89' J. Liukkonen; 91' S. Laakkonen

Volga-Sport-Arena, Ulyanovsk
Attendance: 937
Referee: Nikita Yuklyaevskikh (RUS)
Game 12
Wed. 3 February 2016
19:00

Russia	3–6	Sweden
M. Ishkeldin 48'; E. Dergaev 49'; E. Ivanushkin 53'	Report	15', 24', 27' C. Edlund; 18', 28' E. Pettersson; 66' D. Mossberg

~~Trud~~ Volga-Sport-Arena, Ulyanovsk
Attendance: 4,350
Referee: Mats Olof Gustafsson (FIN)

==== Group B ====
Pos	Team	Pld	W	D	L	GF	GA	GD	Pts
1	Belarus	3	3	0	0	32	13	+19	6
2	Norway	3	2	0	1	30	9	+21	4
3	United States	3	1	0	2	17	14	+3	2
4	Latvia	3	0	0	3	5	47	−42	0

Game 1
Mon. 1 February 2016
10:00

United States	11–1	Latvia
A. Skalbeck 16'; K. Brown 16', 21'; D. Richardson 31', 61', 77'; J. Blucher 40'; M. Lickteig 43'; R. Haney 66'; M. Carman 83', 85'	Report	87' (p) J. Kadnajs

Volga-Sport-Arena, Ulyanovsk
Attendance: 1,700
Referee: Roland Fager (SWE)
Game 2
Mon. 1 February 2016
13:00

Belarus	7–5	Norway
S. Yusupov 6'; A. Kabanov 20', 34', 58', 70' (p); K. Savchenko 48'; R. Nikitenko 81'	Report	4' F. Randsborg; 37' M. Austad; 69' N. Jensen; 77' F. Hagberg; 87' C. Waaler

Volga-Sport-Arena, Ulyanovsk
Attendance: 1,700
Referee: Mats-Olof Gustafsson (FIN)
Game 5
Tue. 2 February 2016
10:00

Latvia	2–18	Belarus
L. Ziemiņš 35'; A. Befus 87'	Report	5', 20', 27', 36', 40', 57' (p), 62', 79' A. Kabanov; 8' M. Koshelev; 22', 26', 53', 61', 67', 76' R. Nikitenko; 44', 60' S. Chernetskiy; 70' S. Yusupov

Volga-Sport-Arena, Ulyanovsk
Attendance: 850
Referee: Mats-Olof Gustafsson (FIN)
Game 6
Tue. 2 February 2016
13:00

Norway	7–0	United States
M. Austad 9'; F. Hagberg 20'; N. Jensen 27'; F. Randsborg 36'; P. Loyning 67'; S. Kristoffersen 87'; M. Hogevold 89'	Report

Volga-Sport-Arena, Ulyanovsk
Attendance: 822
Referee: Nikita Yuklyaevskikh (RUS)
Game 9
Wed. 3 February 2016
10:00

Latvia	2–18	Norway
D.D. Orlovs 50'; L. Ziemiņš 88'	Report	2' E. Johnsen; 8' F. Randsborg; 17' P. Loyning; 29' F. Hagberg; 32', 43' P. Moen; 41', 63', 67', 82', 86' N. Jensen; 48', 89' S. Kristiffersen; 49' M. Hogevold; 65', 78', 85' M. Austad; 70' own goal

Volga-Sport-Arena, Ulyanovsk
Game 10
Wed. 3 February 2016
13:00

Belarus	7–6	United States
S. Yusupov 2', 63'; R. Nikitenko 6', 54'; V. Bratchenko 35'; A. Kabanov 65' (p), 72'	Report	16' P. Knutson; 18' D. Richardson; 26', 66', 82' (p) M. Lickteig; 75' M. Carman

Volga-Sport-Arena, Ulyanovsk

=== Knockout stage ===
Quarter-finals
4 February – Ulyanovsk
Sweden	28
Latvia	3
4 February – Ulyanovsk
Finland	17
Belarus	3
4 February – Dimitrovgrad
Russia	12
United States	2
4 February – Ulyanovsk
Kazakhstan	11
Norway	3

Semi-finals
6 February – Ulyanovsk
Sweden	2
Finland	3
6 February – Ulyanovsk
Russia	16
Kazakhstan	6

Final
7 February – Ulyanovsk
Finland	1
Russia	6
Third place
7 February – Ulyanovsk
Sweden	4
Kazakhstan	0

==== Quarter-finals ====
Game 13
Thu. 4 February 2016
10:00

Kazakhstan	11–3	Norway
V. Bronnikov 12', 21', 80' (p), 86' (p); R. Galyautdinov 31', 76'; R. Isaliyev 48', 58', 68'; M. Gavrilenko 50'; S. Pochkunov 55'	Report	19' (p), 45' (p) N. Jensen; 78' F. Randsborg

Volga-Sport-Arena, Ulyanovsk
Attendance: 193
Referee: Petri Kuusela (FIN)
Game 14
Thu. 4 February 2016
13:00

Finland	17–3	Belarus
V. Aaltonen 3'; M. Kumpuoja 4', 88'; T. Mustonen 7', 18', 52'; J. Liukkonen 8', 20', 54'; M. Lukkarila 11', 90'; S. Laakkonen 44', 85'; S. Helavuori 56'; E. Peuhkuri 66', 74'; J. Rintala 70'	Report	6' S. Chernetskiy; 63', 71' S. Yusupov

Volga-Sport-Arena, Ulyanovsk
Attendance: 971
Referee: Roland Fager (SWE)
Game 15
Thu. 4 February 2016
16:00

Sweden	28–3	Latvia
D. Mossberg 2'; E. Pettersson 4', 38', 49', 62', 84'; A. Westh 5'; D. Berlin 9'; C. Edlund 18', 21', 47', 59', 66'; J. Andersson 26', 29', 31', 47', 60', 67', 69', 79'; D. Pizzoni Elfving 34'; S. Jansson 40', 63', 86'; L. Pettersson 68'; E. Säfström 76'; O. Englund 82'	Report	36' A. Purviņš; 55', 57' L. Ziemiņš

Volga-Sport-Arena, Ulyanovsk
Attendance: 683
Referee: Nikita Yuklyaevskikh (RUS)
Game 16
Thu. 4 February 2016
19:00

Russia	12–2	United States
I. Larionov 8', 89'; P. Zakharov 16'; D. Saveliev 17'; A. Mirgazov 26', 36'; N. Ivanov 29'; Y. Befus 36'; E. Dergaev 42', 87'; M. Prokofiev 66', 75'	Report	68' M. Lickteig; 79' K. Brown

Stroitel Stadium, Dimitrovgrad
Attendance: 4,623
Referee: Mats Olof Gustafsson (FIN)

==== Semi-finals ====
Game 17
Sat. 6 February 2016
13:00

Russia	16–6	Kazakhstan
M. Ishkeldin 1'; Y. Shardakov 8', 22', 63'; S. Lomanov 21', 55', 74'; E. Ivanushkin 23'; Y. Befus 26', 57'; I. Larionov 36', 65'; Y. Vilkunin 47'; A. Dzhusoev 68', 90'; P. Zakharov 87'	Report	12', 67', 78' S. Pochkunov; 24' P. Dubovik; 52' R. Isaliyev; 85' D. Zavidovsky

Trud, Ulyanovsk
Attendance: 4,217
Referee: Roland Fager (SWE)
Game 18
Sat. 6 February 2016
17:00

Sweden	2–3	Finland
J. Löfstedt 38'; C. Edlund 68'	Report	4' T. Määttä; 17' S. Laakkonen; 58' (p) P. Hiltunen

~~Trud~~ Volga-Sport-Arena, Ulyanovsk
Attendance: 1,293
Referee: Nikita Yuklyaevskikh (RUS)

==== Third place game ====
Game 21
Sun. 7 February 2016
12:00

Sweden	4–0	Kazakhstan
E. Pettersson 4', 52'; S. Jansson 59'; D. Mossberg 83'	Report

Trud, Ulyanovsk
Attendance: 2,642
Referee: Petri Kuusela (FIN)

==== Final ====
Game 22
Sun. 7 February 2016
16:00

Finland	1–6	Russia
T. Määttä 75'	Report; Youtube	4', 22', 42' (p) S. Lomanov; 6' E. Ivanushkin; 32' A. Mirgazov; 89' P. Bulatov

Trud, Ulyanovsk
Attendance: 11,700
Referee: Roland Fager (SWE)

=== Consolation tournament ===
==== 7th place game ====
Game 19
Sat. 6 February 2016

United States	15–0	Latvia
D. Richardson 04'; M. Carman 11', 12', 83'; D. Martinson 31'; M. Lickteig 36'; A. Skalbeck 38', 47'; G. Olson 42'; K. Brown 44', 50', 67', 80'; M. Sandberg 70'; S. Arundel 90'	Report

Volga-Sport-Arena, Ulyanovsk
Referee: Petri Kuusela (FIN)

==== 5th place game ====
Game 20
Sat. 6 February 2016

Belarus	3–8	Norway
R. Nikitenko 20'; V. Bratchenko 27'; M. Pashnel 89'	Report	02' P. Loyning; 14' C. Waaler; 16' N. Jensen; 58' F. Randsborg; 62' own goal 63' P. Moen; 87' F. Hagberg; 90' M. Hogevold

Volga-Sport-Arena, Ulyanovsk

=== Final standings ===
1st place, gold medalist(s)	Russia
2nd place, silver medalist(s)	Finland
3rd place, bronze medalist(s)	Sweden
4	Kazakhstan
5	Norway
6	Belarus
7	United States
8	Latvia

=== Champions ===
The Russian squad winning the 2016 World Championship was set together of the following players.

#	Pos.	Age	Name	Club
1	GK	31	Roman Chernykh	(Russia) Yenisey Krasnoyarsk
30	GK	29	Denis Rysev	(Russia) Bajkal Energija
24	DF	30	Yuri Vikulin	(Russia) Yenisey Krasnoyarsk
29	DF	33	Pyotr Zakharov	(Russia) Volga Ulyanovsk
32	DF	32	Pavel Bulatov	(Russia) SKA-Neftyanik Khabarovsk
55	DF	26	Mikhail Prokopyev	(Russia) Yenisey Krasnoyarsk
8	MF	25	Maxim Ishkeldin	(Russia) SKA-Neftyanik Khabarovsk
12	MF	25	Yuri Shardakov	(Russia) SKA-Neftyanik Khabarovsk
15	DF	23	Alan Dzhusoyev	(Russia) Yenisey Krasnoyarsk
17	MF	36	Dmitry Savelyev	(Russia) Dynamo Moscow
18	MF	37	Sergei Shaburov	(Russia) Dynamo Moscow
20	MF	24	Janis Befus	(Russia) Dynamo Moscow
21	MF	31	Igor Larionov	(Russia) Volga Ulyanovsk
23	MF	27	Evgeny Dergaev	(Russia) Vodnik Arkhangelsk
7	FW	35	Sergei Lomanov Jr	(Russia) Yenisey Krasnoyarsk
10	FW	23	Almaz Mirgazov	(Russia) Yenisey Krasnoyarsk
44	FW	19	Nikita Ivanov	(Russia) Dynamo Moscow
88	FW	36	Yevgeny Ivanushkin	(Russia) Dynamo Moscow

== Division B ==
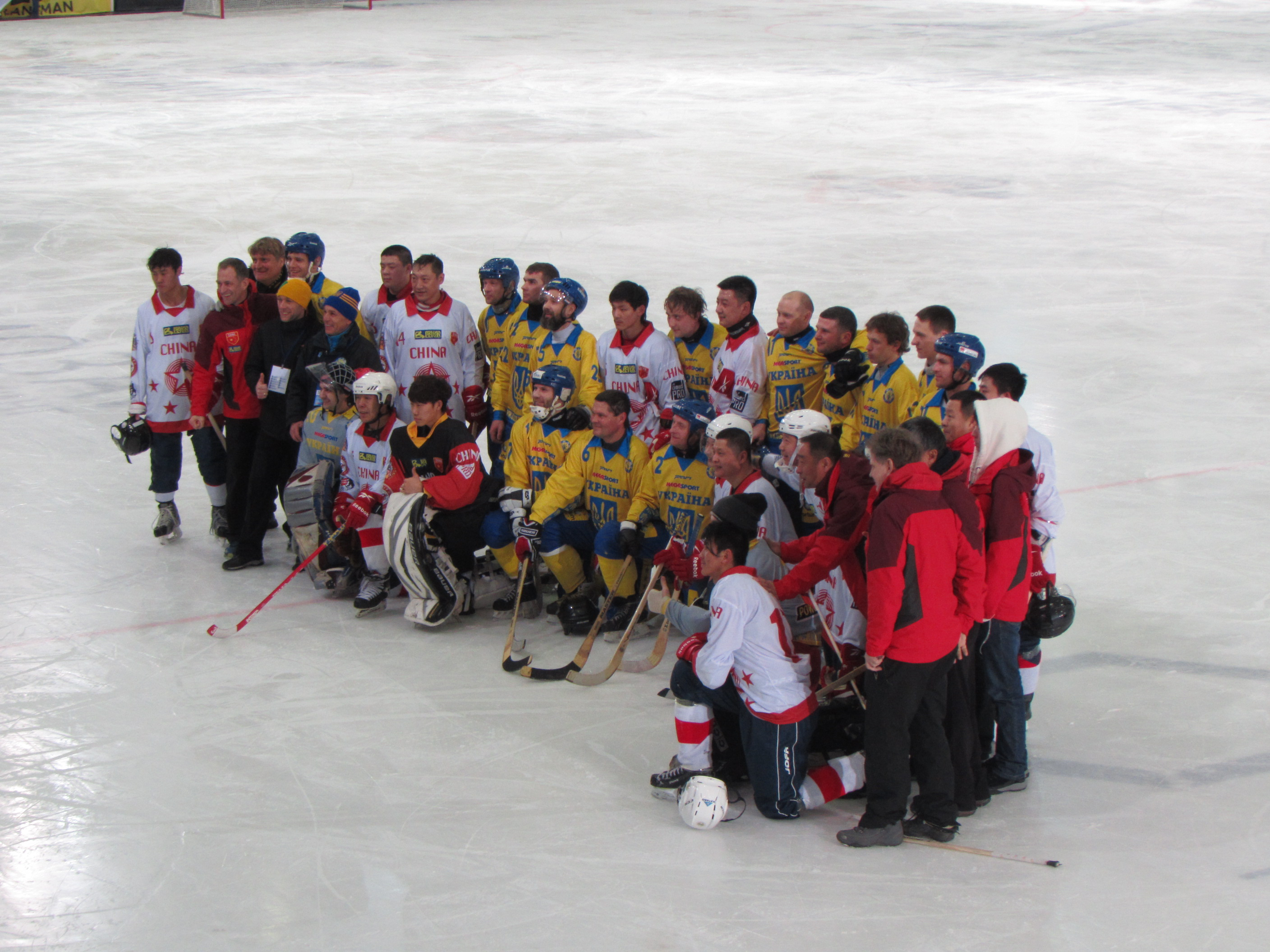
China made its second WCS appearance, while for Ukraine it was the third time

=== Preliminary round ===
==== Group A ====
Pos	Team	Pld	W	D	L	GF	GA	GD	Pts	Qualification
1	Germany	3	3	0	0	17	7	+10	6	Quarterfinals
2	Hungary	3	2	0	1	15	10	+5	4	Quarterfinals
3	Netherlands	3	1	0	2	10	14	−4	2	Quarterfinals
–	Estonia	3	0	0	3	2	13	−11	0	Disqualified

10 February 2016
11:30

Estonia	6–2 (awd 0–5)	Netherlands

Volga-Sport-Arena, Ulyanovsk
10 February 2016
14:00

Germany	6–4	Hungary

Volga-Sport-Arena, Ulyanovsk
11 February 2016
14:00

Estonia	2–3	Hungary

Volga-Sport-Arena, Ulyanovsk
11 February 2016
18:00

Netherlands	3–6	Germany

Stroitel, Dimitrovgrad
12 February 2016
11:30

Netherlands	2–8	Hungary

Volga-Sport-Arena, Ulyanovsk
12 February 2016
14:00

Germany	7–7 (awd 5–0)	Estonia

Volga-Sport-Arena, Ulyanovsk

Note: Estonia fielded an ineligible player in 2 of their matches. Matches were awarded as 5-0 wins to their opponents, and Estonia were disqualified from the competition.

==== Group B ====
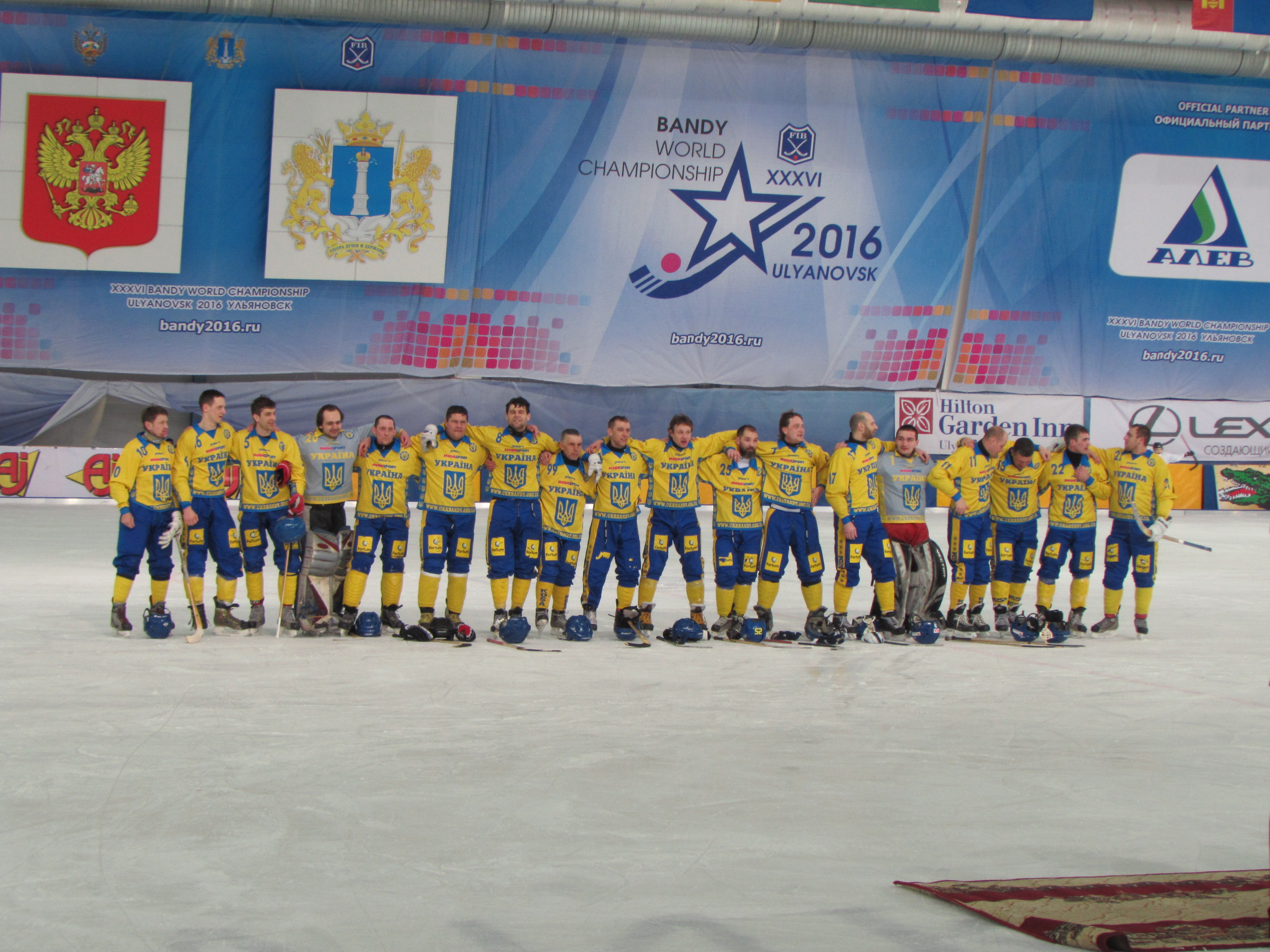
Ukraine national team

Matches in Group B are 60 minutes in duration rather than the standard 90 minutes.

Pos	Team	Pld	W	D	L	GF	GA	GD	Pts	Qualification
1	Ukraine	5	4	0	1	32	12	+20	8	Quarterfinals
2	Japan	5	4	0	1	23	11	+12	8	Quarterfinals
3	Mongolia	5	4	0	1	25	8	+17	8	Quarterfinals
4	Czech Republic	5	2	0	3	37	22	+15	4	Quarterfinals
5	China	5	1	0	4	14	29	−15	2	Quarterfinals
6	Somalia	5	0	0	5	4	53	−49	0	7–9th place group

10 February 2016
07:30

Mongolia	0–4	Japan

Volga-Sport-Arena, Ulyanovsk
10 February 2016
09:30

Somalia	0–17	Czech Republic

Volga-Sport-Arena, Ulyanovsk
10 February 2016
16:30

Ukraine	6–1	Japan

Volga-Sport-Arena, Ulyanovsk
10 February 2016
18:30

Mongolia	7–1	China

Volga-Sport-Arena, Ulyanovsk
10 February 2016
21:00

Czech Republic	7–9	Ukraine

Volga-Sport-Arena, Ulyanovsk
11 February 2016
07:30

China	1–8	Czech Republic

Volga-Sport-Arena, Ulyanovsk
11 February 2016
09:30

Somalia	0–8	Ukraine

Volga-Sport-Arena, Ulyanovsk
11 February 2016
16:30

Czech Republic	4–5	Japan

Volga-Sport-Arena, Ulyanovsk
11 February 2016
18:30

China	2–8	Ukraine

Volga-Sport-Arena, Ulyanovsk
11 February 2016
21:00

Mongolia	9–1	Somalia

Volga-Sport-Arena, Ulyanovsk
12 February 2016
07:30

Japan	10–0	Somalia

Volga-Sport-Arena, Ulyanovsk
12 February 2016
09:30

Czech Republic	1–7	Mongolia

Volga-Sport-Arena, Ulyanovsk
12 February 2016
16:30

China	1–3	Japan

Volga-Sport-Arena, Ulyanovsk
12 February 2016
18:30

Mongolia	2–1	Ukraine

Volga-Sport-Arena, Ulyanovsk
12 February 2016
21:00

China	9–3	Somalia

Volga-Sport-Arena, Ulyanovsk

=== Knockout stage ===
Quarter-finals
13 February – Ulyanovsk
Germany	10
China	5
13 February – Ulyanovsk
Ukraine	2(2)
Japan	2(1)
13 February – Ulyanovsk
Hungary	7
Czech Republic	3
13 February – Ulyanovsk
Netherlands	0
Mongolia	4

Semi-finals
13 February – Ulyanovsk
Germany	5(3)^
Ukraine	5(2)
13 February – Ulyanovsk
Hungary	5
Mongolia	4

Final
14 February – Ulyanovsk
Germany	5
Hungary	4
Third place
14 February – Ulyanovsk
Ukraine	6^
Mongolia	5

^ = Extra time played

==== Quarter-finals ====
The matches were 60 minutes rather than standard 90 minutes.

13 February 2016
07:00

Germany	10–5	China

Volga-Sport-Arena, Ulyanovsk
13 February 2016
09:00

Hungary	7–3	Czech Republic

Volga-Sport-Arena, Ulyanovsk
13 February 2016
11:00

Netherlands	0–4	Mongolia

Volga-Sport-Arena, Ulyanovsk
13 February 2016
13:00

Ukraine	2–2 (2–1 pens)	Japan

Volga-Sport-Arena, Ulyanovsk

==== 7–9th place group ====
The matches were 60 minutes rather than standard 90 minutes.

Pos	Team	Pld	W	D	L	GF	GA	GD	Pts
1	Czech Republic	2	2	0	0	22	2	+20	4
2	China	2	1	0	1	16	7	+9	2
3	Somalia	2	0	0	2	1	30	−29	0

13 February 2016
17:00

Czech Republic	16–0	Somalia

Volga-Sport-Arena, Ulyanovsk
14 February 2016
08:00

China	14–1	Somalia

Volga-Sport-Arena, Ulyanovsk
14 February 2016
13:00

Czech Republic	6–2	China

Volga-Sport-Arena, Ulyanovsk

==== Semi-finals ====
The matches were 60 minutes rather than standard 90 minutes.

13 February 2016
20:00

Hungary	5–4	Mongolia

Volga-Sport-Arena, Ulyanovsk
13 February 2016
22:00

Germany	5–5 (3–2 pens) (a.e.t.)	Ukraine

Volga-Sport-Arena, Ulyanovsk

==== 5th place game ====
The match was 60 minutes rather than standard 90 minutes.

14 February 2016
10:30

Japan	3–2	Netherlands

Volga-Sport-Arena, Ulyanovsk

==== Third place game ====
14 February 2016
15:30

Ukraine	6–5 (a.e.t.)	Mongolia

Volga-Sport-Arena, Ulyanovsk

==== Final ====
14 February 2016
18:00

Germany	5–4	Hungary

Volga-Sport-Arena, Ulyanovsk

=== Final standings ===
1.	Germany
2.	Hungary
3.	Ukraine
4.	Mongolia
5.	Japan
6.	Netherlands
7.	Czech Republic
8.	China
9.	Somalia
DQ.	Estonia

== Broadcasting ==
- Finland: Yle
- Sweden: Kanal 5, Eurosport 2
- International: https://web.archive.org/web/20160205193815/http://bandy2016.ru/en/photos-and-videos/broadcasts

== Surrounding events ==
Ulyanovsk Oblast Governor Sergey Ivanovich Morozov has taken a special interest in promoting the cultural events surrounding the 2016 Bandy World Championship, since it takes place in Ulyanovsk. Many streets, enterprises and organizations were decorated with the symbols of the bandy championship.

On January 23 the bright event "Stars of Sport" were held for inhabitants and visitors of the city, as a prelude to the opening ceremony of the world championship. It was held at the shopping center “Aquamall” in downtown Ulyanovsk and featured sports stars like Ilia Averbukh and Maxim Marinin.

The formal opening ceremony was held on January 31, 2016.
