= Afghanistan national bandy team =

Men's national bandy team

Afghanistan national bandy team has been set up by bandy playing Afghan expatriates in Karlstad, Sweden, taking up a sport which is very popular in Sweden.

The team is not sanctioned by the sports governing bodies in Afghanistan, even if the Federation of International Bandy has accepted Afghanistan as a member, so it is not allowed to take part in the World Championship. However, it has played friendlies against the Somalia national bandy team (which is also based in Sweden) in 2016 and 2017.
