= Russian Government Cup 1992 =

Russian Government Cup 1992 was a bandy competition played in Krasnojarsk during the period 28 January-2 February 1992. Sweden won the tournament.

This was the first time the Russia national bandy team played, and the last time the Commonwealth of Independent States national bandy team played.

The tournament began with a group stage and then had a knock-out stage to decide the final winner, with the teams losing in the semi-finals playing a third place consolation game. There was also a game for fifth place between the two teams coming in last in the group stage.

== Results of the group stage ==
Team	Pld	W	D	L	GF	GA	GD	Pts
CIS	5	5	0	0	30	6	+24	10
Finland	5	3	0	2	25	16	+9	6
Russia	5	3	0	2	21	16	+5	6
Sweden	5	3	0	2	18	17	+1	6
Khakassia	5	1	0	4	8	21	−13	2
Norway	5	0	0	5	4	30	−26	0

== Knock-out stage ==
=== Semifinals ===
Russia - Finland 5-3
CIS - Sweden 5-6

=== Match for fifth place ===
Khakassia - Norway 4-2

=== Match for third place ===
CIS - Finland 9-0

=== Final ===
Sweden - Russia 7-3

== Sources ==
- Norway's men's internationals in bandy
- Sweden-Sovjet in bandy
- Rossijaturneringen
