= Aleksandr Dryagin =

Kazakhstani bandy player (born 1972)

Personal information
- Full name: Aleksandr Nikolayevich Dryagin
- Born: 24 May 1972 (age 53) Polevskoy, Soviet Union
- Playing position: Midfielder

Senior career*
Years	Team	Apps^{†}	(Gls)^{†}
1990–1995	SKA-Sverdlovsk		
1995–1998	Ale/Surte BK		
1998–2005	Vetlanda BK		
2002–2003	→ Helenelunds IK (loan)		
2005–2006	Zorky		
2006–2008	Sandvikens AIK		
2008–2009	Uralsky Trubnik		
2009–2010	Sandvikens AIK		
2010–2012	Skutskärs IF		

National team
1994–1995	Russia		
2002–2011	Kazakhstan		
- * Senior club appearances and goals counted for the domestic league only. † Appearances (Goals).

Aleksandr Nikolayevich Dryagin (Russian: Александр Николаевич Дрягин; born 24 May 1972) is a former bandy player who most recently played for Skutskärs IF as a midfielder. Alexander was brought up by Seversky Trubnik. Alexander played for the Russian national bandy team in the 1994–95 season but later played for the Kazakhstan national bandy team, for which he made his debut in the 2002–03 season.
