= Volga Ulyanovsk (bandy) =

Volga
- City: Ulyanovsk, Russia
- League: Russian Bandy Super League
- Founded: 1934; 91 years ago
- Home arena: Volga-Sport-Arena
- Head coach: Dmitry Malanin
Home colours	Away colours

Volga Ulyanovsk (Russian: Волга) is a bandy club from Ulyanovsk, Russia. Volga currently plays in the Russian Bandy Super League, the highest division of Russian bandy.

The team was founded in 1934 and has played in the top division of Soviet and Russian bandy championships since 1959. In 2014, they got the indoor Volga-Sport-Arena. This arena hosted all but two games at the 2016 World Championship.

== See also ==
- Category:Volga Ulyanovsk players
