= Sergey Ivanovich Lomanov =

Russian bandy manager and former player (born 1957)

Sergey Lomanov
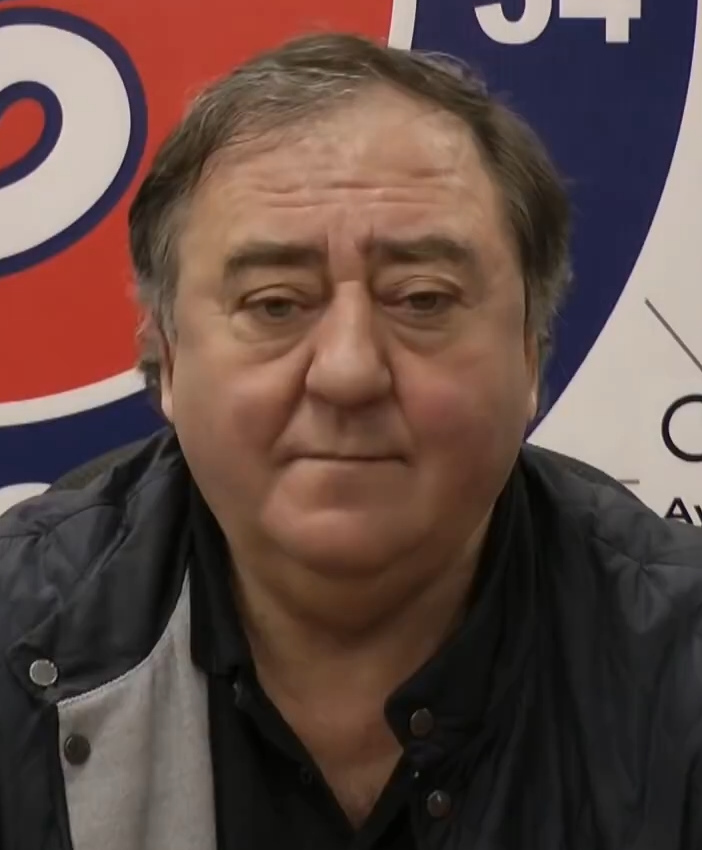
- Lomanov in 2020

Personal information
- Full name: Sergey Ivanovich Lomanov
- Date of birth: 22 May 1957 (age 67)
- Place of birth: Krasnoyarsk, Russia
- Playing position: Forward

Youth career
- Yenisey

Senior career*
Years	Team	Apps^{†}	(Gls)^{†}
1973–1989	Yenisey		
1989–1995	IK Sirius		
1995–1996	Yenisey		

National team
1976–1991	Soviet Union		

Teams managed
- 2006–2007: Dynamo Moscow
- 2008–2009: Yenisey
- * Senior club appearances and goals counted for the domestic league only. † Appearances (Goals).

Sergey Ivanovich Lomanov (Russian: Сергей Иванович Ломанов; born 22 May 1957 in Krasnoyarsk) is a Russian bandy manager and former player (forward). He made 183 goals for the Soviet Union national bandy team. He played his club bandy for Yenisey Krasnoyarsk and IK Sirius.

He is the father of Sergey Sergeyevich Lomanov.
