= Lepse Plant =

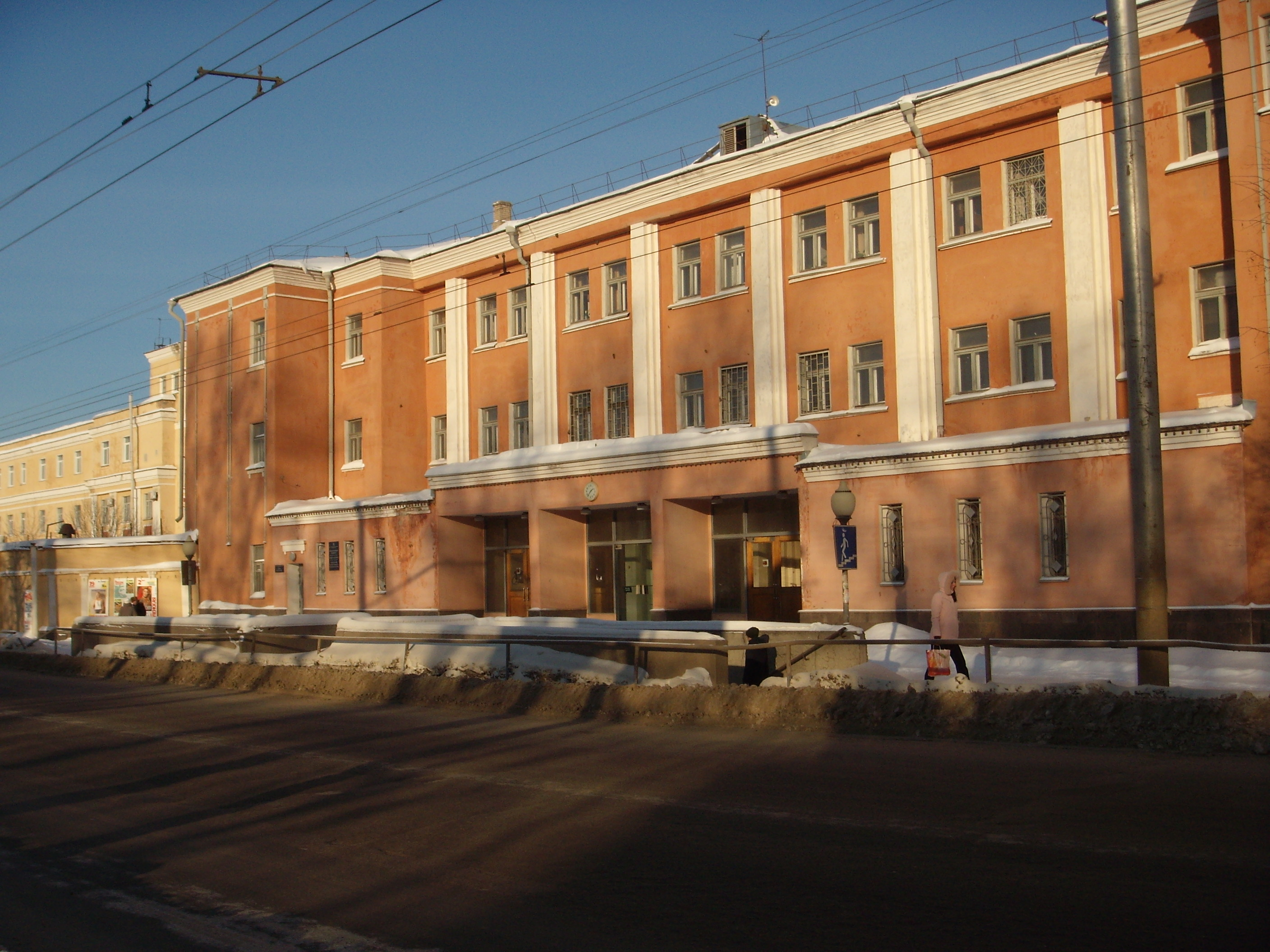
Lepse factory gate number 2

Lepse Electric Machine-Building Plant (Russian: Электромашиностроительный завод «Лепсе») is a company based in Kirov, Russia and established in 1941. It is part of Uralvagonzavod.

The Lepse Electric Machine-Building Plant produces a wide range of electrical components for aircraft, as well as consumer goods.
