= Sibselmash Stadium =

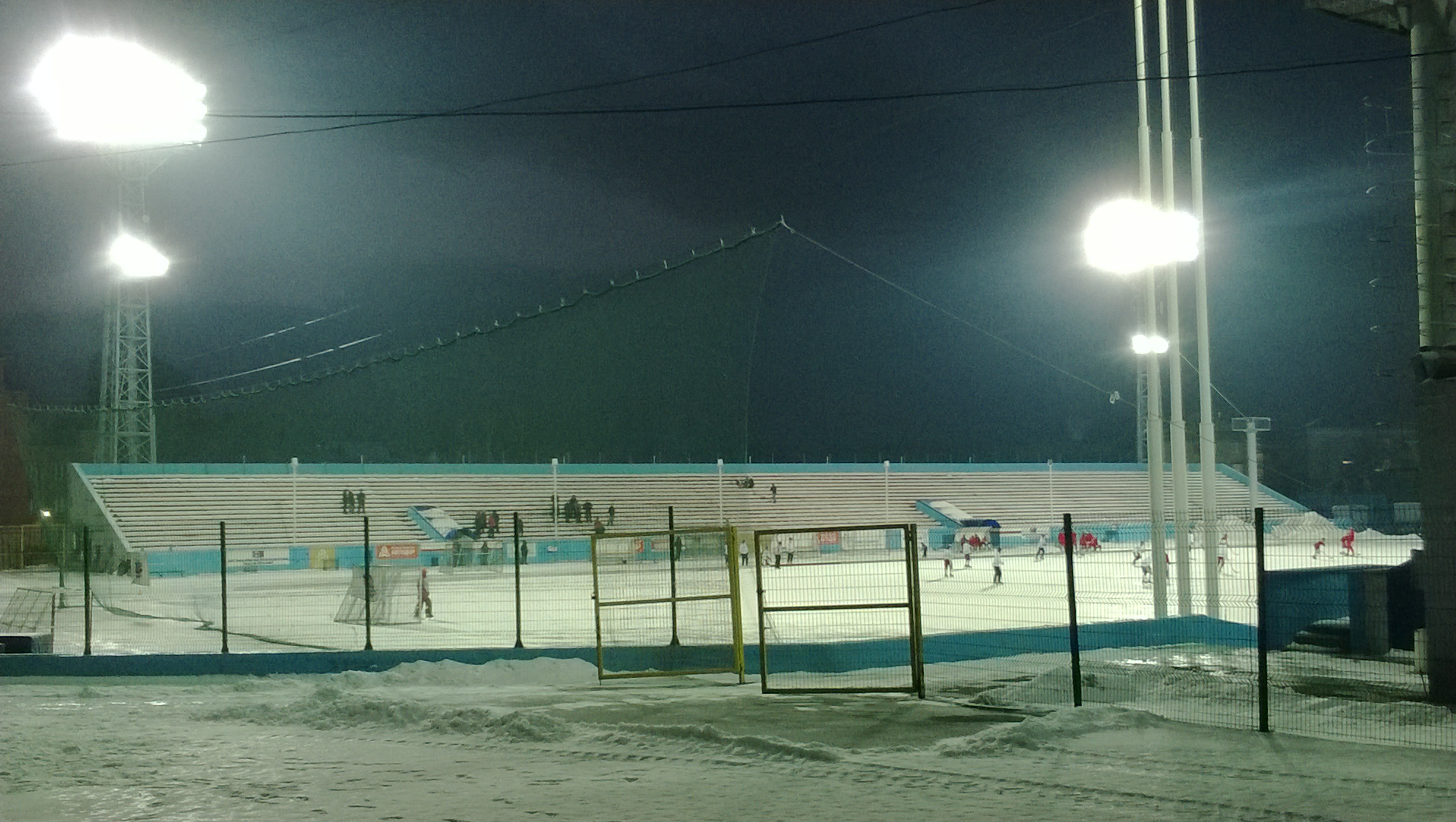
- Interactive map of Sibselmash Stadium
- Location: Novosibirsk, Russia
- Coordinates: 54°59′21.97″N 82°52′59.27″E
- Capacity: 8,000

Construction
- Opened: 1972

Tenant
- Sibselmash

Sibselmash Stadium is a sports venue in Novosibirsk. It is the home of Sibselmash.
