= Russia national bandy team =

Russia
- Association: Russian Bandy Federation (Федерация хоккея с мячом России)
- Head coach: (Russia) Pavel Frants
- Team colors

First international
- Russia 3 – 5 Sweden; Helsinki, 10 March 1907

Biggest win
- Russia 28 – 1 Belarus; Vänersborg, 30 January 2013

Biggest defeat
- Sweden 8 – 0 Russia; Hamar, 7 February 1993

Bandy World Championship
- Appearances: 22 (first in 1993)
- Best result: Champions (1999, 2001, 2006, 2007, 2008, 2011, 2013, 2014, 2015, 2016, 2018, 2019)

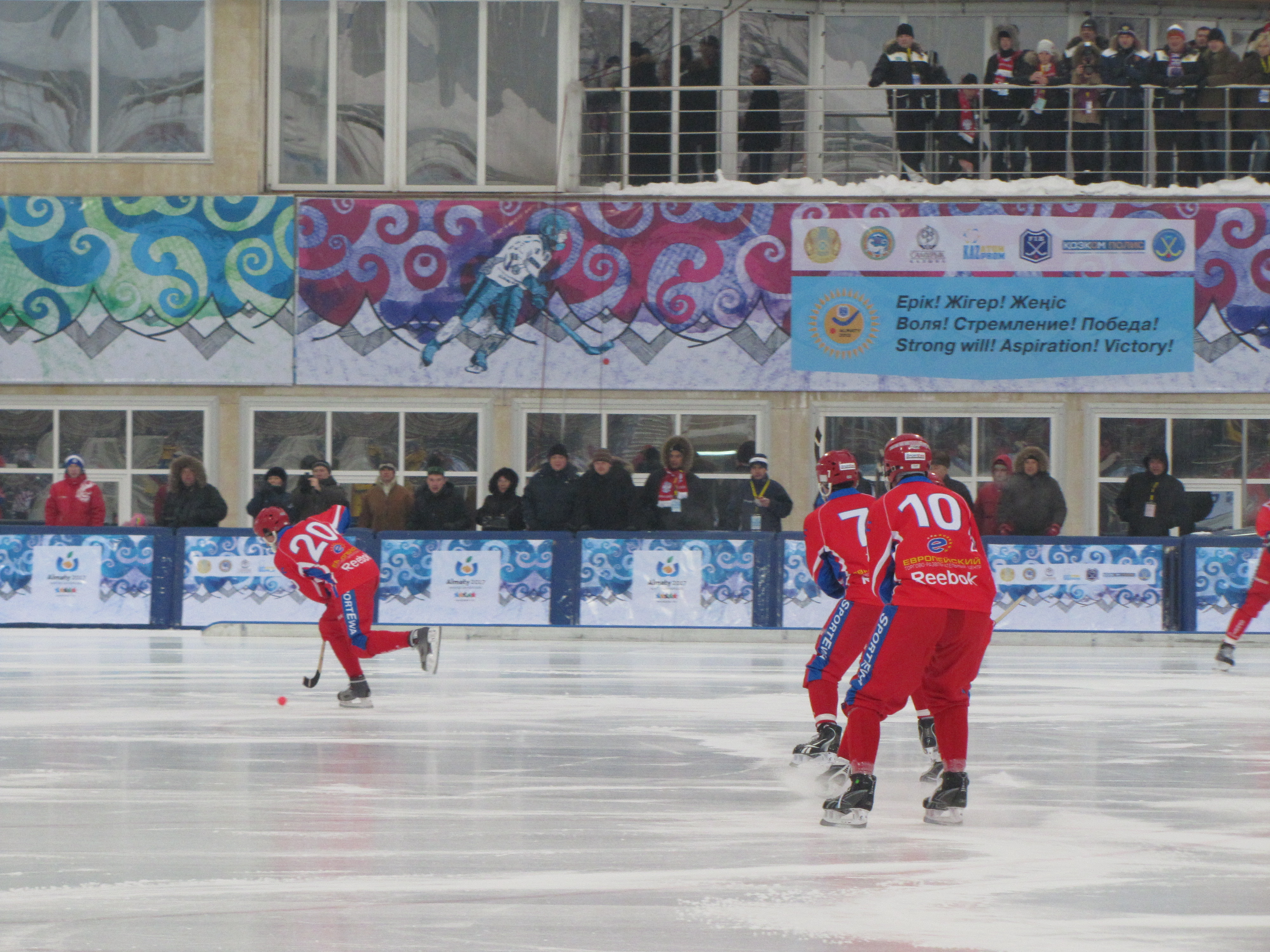
Russia in the 2012 World Championship

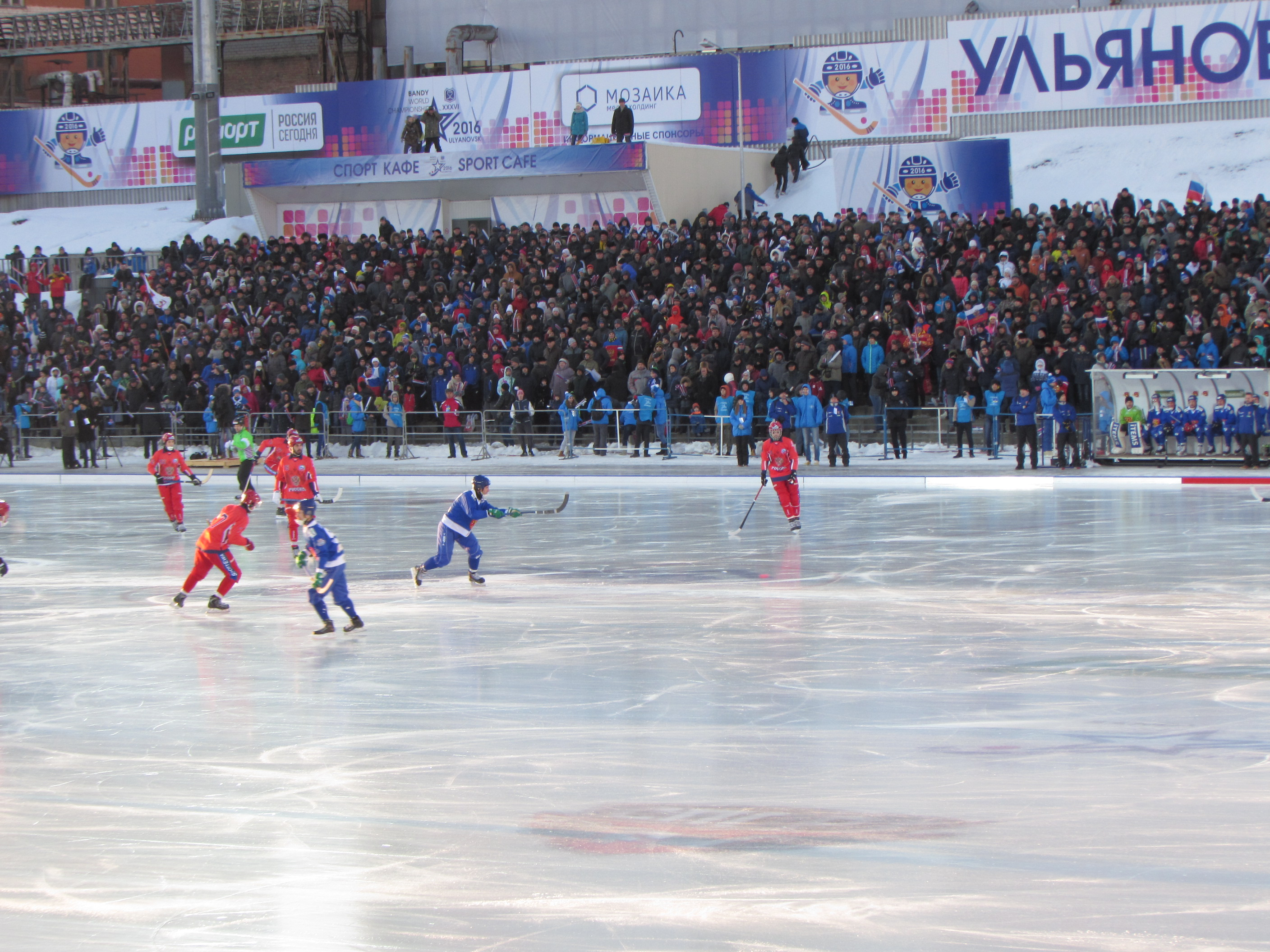
Winning the 2016 World Championship final

The Russia national bandy team represents Russia in international bandy. There is a national team for men's competitions and a women's national bandy team. This article deals chiefly with the men's national bandy team.

Until 1991 there was a national bandy team for the Soviet Union, but a team formally representing the Russian SFSR made a one-off appearance at the Rossiya Tournament 1986, also playing against the Soviet Union team. At the Russian Government Cup 1992 (Rossiya Tournament with a new name), the independent Russia played, amongst others, against the Commonwealth of Independent States national bandy team, the brief successor of the Soviet team, before Russia was admitted to the Federation of International Bandy in June of the same year.

Russia became a member of the Federation of International Bandy following the dissolution of the Soviet Union in 1991.

The first time post-Soviet Russia played was at the Russian Government Cup 1992, when Commonwealth of Independent States also participated. CIS was considered the temporary successor of the Soviet team and consequently the number one team. After that tournament, CIS did not play again and in the 1993 world championship, Russia represented the country. The team has won the Bandy World Championship twelve times, in 1999, 2001, 2006, 2007, 2008, 2011, 2013, 2014, 2015, 2016, 2018 and 2019.

The men's 2020 Bandy World Championship was to be held in Russia but was postponed because of the COVID-19 pandemic, first to later in the year, then to 2021 and then to 2022 before being finally cancelled on 1 March 2022, after Finland, Sweden, Norway, and the United States announced that they would not take part in the competition in Russia due to the 2022 Russian invasion of Ukraine.

== World Championship record ==
Tournament	Final standing
1957 – 1991	As Soviet Union
Norway 1993	Silver
USA 1995	Silver
Sweden 1997	Silver
Russia 1999	Gold
Finland and Sweden 2001	Gold
Russia 2003	Silver
Sweden 2004	Bronze
Russia 2005	Silver
Sweden 2006	Gold
Russia 2007	Gold
Russia 2008	Gold
Sweden 2009	Silver
Russia 2010	Silver
Russia 2011	Gold
Kazakhstan 2012	Silver
Sweden 2013	Gold
Russia 2014	Gold
Russia 2015	Gold
Russia 2016	Gold
Sweden 2017	Silver
Russia 2018	Gold
Sweden 2019	Gold
Russia 2020	COVID-19 pandemic.
2022 –	Russian invasion of Ukraine

== World Championship squad in 2016 ==
Russian squad at the 2016 World Championship in Ulyanovsk, Russia, 1–2 February 2016, which won the World Championship title that year.

#	Pos.	Age	Name	Club
1	GK	31	Roman Chernykh	(Russia) Yenisey Krasnoyarsk
30	GK	29	Denis Rysev	(Russia) Bajkal Energija
24	DF	30	Yuri Vikulin	(Russia) Yenisey Krasnoyarsk
29	DF	33	Pyotr Zakharov	(Russia) Volga Ulyanovsk
32	DF	32	Pavel Bulatov	(Russia) SKA-Neftyanik Khabarovsk
55	DF	26	Mikhail Prokopyev	(Russia) Yenisey Krasnoyarsk
8	MF	25	Maxim Ishkeldin	(Russia) SKA-Neftyanik Khabarovsk
12	MF	25	Yuri Shardakov	(Russia) SKA-Neftyanik Khabarovsk
15	DF	23	Alan Dzhusoyev	(Russia) Yenisey Krasnoyarsk
17	MF	36	Dmitry Savelyev (bandy player)	(Russia) Dynamo Moscow
18	MF	37	Sergei Shaburov	(Russia) Dynamo Moscow
20	MF	24	Janis Befus	(Russia) Dynamo Moscow
21	MF	31	Igor Larionov	(Russia) Volga Ulyanovsk
23	MF	27	Evgeny Dergaev	(Russia) Vodnik Arkhangelsk
7	FW	35	Sergei Lomanov Jr	(Russia) Yenisey Krasnoyarsk
10	FW	23	Almaz Mirgazov	(Russia) Yenisey Krasnoyarsk
44	FW	19	Nikita Ivanov	(Russia) Dynamo Moscow
88	FW	36	Yevgeny Ivanushkin	(Russia) Dynamo Moscow
