= 2014 Bandy World Championship =

XXXIVth Bandy World Championship

Tournament details
- Host country: Russia
- Venue(s): 4 (in 2 host cities)
- Dates: 26 January – 2 February
- Teams: 17

Final positions
- Champions: Russia (8th title)
- Runners-up: Sweden
- Third place: Kazakhstan
- Fourth place: Finland

Tournament statistics
- Scoring leader(s): Christoffer Edlund (12 goals)

The 2014 Bandy World Championship was held between 26 January and 2 February 2014, in Irkutsk and Shelekhov, Russia. 17 nations participated in the tournament, playing in two divisions partitioned into two subdivisions. A team representing Somalia took part, the first squad from Africa to play in the Bandy World Championship.

== Participating teams ==
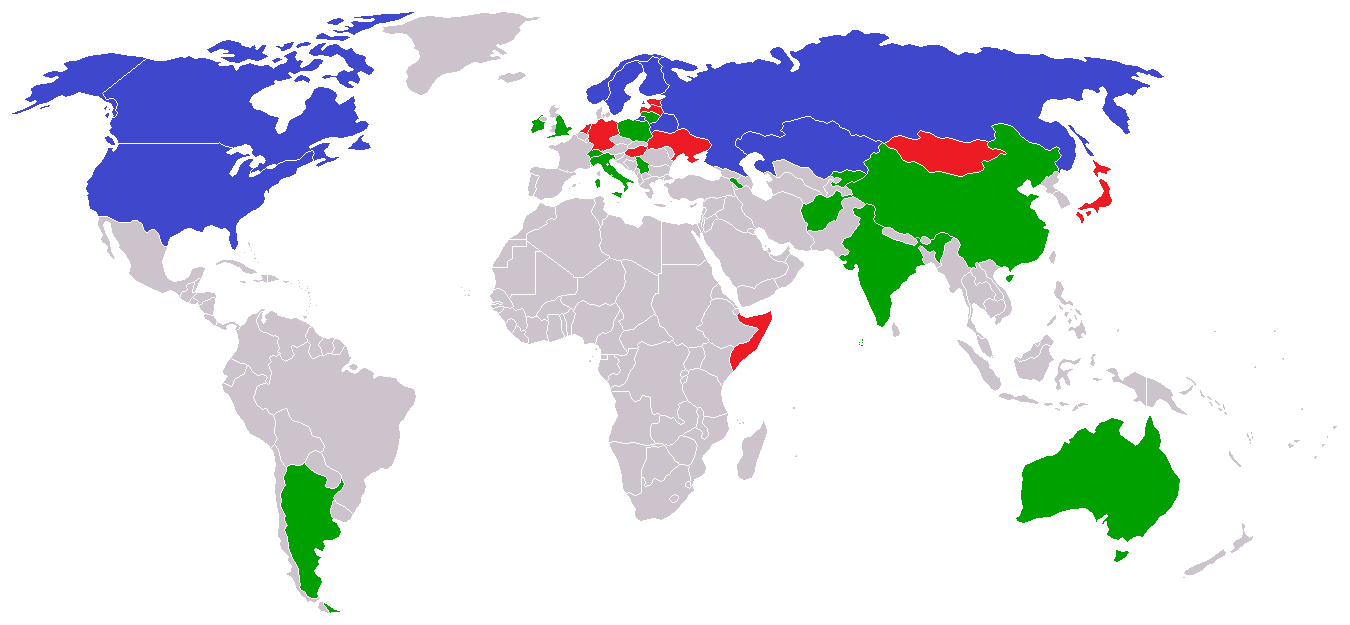
Participating countries in the Bandy World Championship 2014. Blue: Division A Red: Division B Green: members of the Federation of International Bandy not participating in this year's World Championship

=== Division A ===
- Belarus
- Canada
- Finland
- Kazakhstan
- Norway
- Russia
- Sweden
- United States

=== Division B ===
- Estonia
- Germany
- Hungary
- Japan
- Latvia
- Mongolia
- Netherlands
- Somalia
- Ukraine

== Venues ==
- Trud Stadium, Irkutsk (capacity: 16,500)
- Rekord Stadium, Irkutsk (capacity: 5,300)
- Zenith Stadium, Irkutsk (capacity: 4,000)
- Stroitel Stadium, Shelekhov (capacity: 4,000)

== Division A ==
- After drawn games in the group stage, a penalty shootout is held to determine final placings in the event of teams finishing on equal points

=== Preliminary round ===
==== Group A ====
Pos	Team	Pld	W	D	L	GF	GA	GD	Pts
1	Russia	3	2	1	0	19	5	+14	5 (Note: Russia won after-match penalties against Sweden 3–1.)
2	Sweden	3	2	1	0	22	5	+17	5
3	Kazakhstan	3	1	0	2	10	24	−14	2
4	Finland	3	0	0	3	6	23	−17	0

Rules for classification: 1) points; 2) number of points obtained in matches between tied teams 3) after-match penalty goals in matches between tied teams
Notes:

All times are local (UTC+8).

26 January 2014
15:00

Russia	10–1	Kazakhstan
Lomanov 6', 51'; Bushuyev 15'; Zakharov 25'; Dorovskikh 49'; Yegorchev 62'; Ivanushkin 64', 68'; Dzhusoyev 79', 86'	Report	Zavidovsky 87'

Trud Stadium, Irkutsk
Attendance: 10,000
Referee: Christoffer Ajdesjö (Sweden)
26 January 2014
20:00

Sweden	9–1	Finland
Edlund 19', 62', 84' (pen); Nilsson 25' (pen); D. Andersson 43', 69'; Berlin 54'; E. Pettersson 80', 82'	Report	Angeria 67'

Trud Stadium, Irkutsk
Attendance: 8,500
Referee: Nikita Yuklyayevskikh (Russia)
27 January 2014
16:00

Finland	2–7	Russia
Angeria 27'; Aaltonen 72'	Report	Bondarenko 17'; Befus 23'; Ivanushkin 29'; Lomanov 68', 85'; Ishkeldin 81'; Zakharov 90'

Trud Stadium, Irkutsk
Attendance: 3,000
Referee: Håkan Sjösten (Sweden)
27 January 2014
20:00

Kazakhstan	2–11	Sweden
Nasonov 52'; Issaliev 57'	Report	Nilsson 3', 24', 37', 75'; Gilljam 10'; Berlin 17'; Löftstedt 31', 79'; Edlund 58', 90'; E. Pettersson 69'

Trud Stadium, Irkutsk
Attendance: 1,500
Referee: Juha-Matti Kanniainen (Finland)
29 January 2014
16:00

Kazakhstan	7–3	Finland
Zavidovsky 8', 12'; Pochkunov 49', 75'; Nasonov 68'; Dubovik 74'; Issaliev 79'	Report	Liukkonen 6'; Ekman 17'; Lukkarila 62'

Trud Stadium, Irkutsk
Attendance: 1,000
Referee: Grigoriy Minaev (Russia)
29 January 2014
20:00

Russia	2–2	Sweden
Dzhusoyev 22'; Lomanov 75'	Report	Löfstedt 45'; Edlund 51'

Trud Stadium, Irkutsk
Attendance: 8,500
Referee: Petri Kuusela (Finland)

==== Group B ====
Pos	Team	Pld	W	D	L	GF	GA	GD	Pts
1	Norway	3	2	1	0	40	9	+31	5 (Note: Norway won after-match penalties against United States 2–1.)
2	United States	3	2	1	0	19	9	+10	5
3	Belarus	3	1	0	2	13	33	−20	2
4	Canada	3	0	0	3	7	27	−20	0

Rules for classification: 1) points; 2) number of points obtained in matches between tied teams 3) after-match penalty goals in matches between tied teams
Notes:
26 January 2014

United States	7–4	Belarus

Zenit Stadium, Irkutsk
26 January 2014

Norway	12–3	Canada

Stroitel Stadium, Shelekhov
27 January 2014

Canada	1–7	United States

Trud Stadium, Irkutsk
27 January 2014

Belarus	1–23	Norway

Zenit Stadium, Irkutsk
29 January 2014

United States	5–5	Norway

Trud Stadium, Irkutsk
29 January 2014

Canada	3–8	Belarus

Stroitel Stadium, Shelekhov

=== Knockout stage ===
Quarter-finals
30 January – Irkutsk
Norway	2
Finland	9
30 January – Irkutsk
Russia	22
Canada	1
30 January – Irkutsk
Sweden	33
Belarus	5
30 January – Shelekhov
United States	3
Kazakhstan	11

Semi-finals
1 February – Irkutsk
Finland	1
Russia	3
1 February – Irkutsk
Sweden	4
Kazakhstan	3

Final
2 February – Irkutsk
Russia	3
Sweden	2
Third place
2 February – Irkutsk
Finland	3
Kazakhstan	5

==== Quarter-finals ====
30 January 2014
12:45

Norway	2–9	Finland
	Report

Zenit Stadium, Irkutsk
Attendance: 250
Referee: Christoffer Ajdesjö (Sweden)
30 January 2014
13:00

United States	3–11	Kazakhstan
	Report

Stroitel Stadium, Shelekhov
Attendance: 300
Referee: Grigory Minaev (Russia)
30 January 2014
15:00

Sweden	33–5	Belarus
	Report

Trud Stadium, Irkutsk
Attendance: 300
Referee: Juha-Matti Kanniainen (Finland)
30 January 2014
19:00

Russia	22–1	Canada
Lomanov 2', 33'; Bondarenko 6', 19', 25', 72', 81'; Larionov 13', 41', 45', 52', 66', 67'; Ivanushkin 18', 54', 61', 79', 84'; Tyukavin 31', 59'; Ishkeldin 36'; Befus 44'	Report	D. Ellement 69'

Trud Stadium, Irkutsk
Attendance: 500
Referee: Christoffer Ajdesjö (Sweden)

==== Semi-finals ====
1 February 2014
16:00

Finland	1–3	Russia
Lukkarila 86'	Report	Vikulin 45'; Larionov 56'; Ivanushkin 70'

Trud Stadium, Irkutsk
Attendance: 3,000
Referee: Håkan Sjösten (Sweden)
1 February 2014
20:00

Sweden	4–3	Kazakhstan
	Report

Trud Stadium, Irkutsk
Attendance: 1,500
Referee: Grigory Minaev (Russia)

==== Third place game ====
2 February 2014
10:00

Finland	3–5	Kazakhstan
	Report

Trud Stadium, Irkutsk
Attendance: 1,000
Referee: Håkan Sjösten (Sweden)

==== Final ====
2 February 2014
14:00

Russia	3–2	Sweden
Zakharov 5' (p); Lomanov 40'; Ivanushkin 67'	Report	Berlin 3'; Nilsson 48'

Trud Stadium, Irkutsk
Attendance: 15,000
Referee: Juha-Matti Kanniainen (Finland)

=== Consolation tournament ===
==== 5–8th place semifinals ====
2 February 2014

United States	3–2	Belarus
	report (in Russian)

Zenit Stadium, Irkutsk
2 February 2014

Norway	7–1	Canada
	report (in Russian)

Stroitel Stadium, Shelekhov

==== 7th place game ====
2 February 2014

Belarus	7–5	Canada
	report (in Russian)

Stroitel Stadium, Shelekhov

==== 5th place game ====
2 February 2014

United States	3–6	Norway
	report (in Russian)

Zenit Stadium, Irkutsk

=== Final standings ===
1.	Russia
2.	Sweden
3.	Kazakhstan
4.	Finland
5.	Norway
6.	United States
7.	Belarus
8.	Canada

== Division B ==
- After drawn games in the group stage, a penalty shootout is held to determine final placings in the event of teams finishing on equal points

=== Group C ===
Team	Pld	W	D	L	GF	GA	GD	Pts
Latvia	3	2	1	0	21	11	+10	5
Estonia	3	1	2	0	12	10	+2	4
Hungary	3	1	1	1	12	13	−1	3
Netherlands	3	0	0	3	7	18	−11	0

27 January 2014
Netherlands	2–4	Hungary
Latvia	4–4 (3–2 penalties)	Estonia
28 January 2014
Netherlands	3–10	Latvia
Hungary	4–4 (4–3 penalties)	Estonia
29 January 2014
Estonia	4–2	Netherlands
Latvia	7–4	Hungary

=== Group D ===
Team	Pld	W	D	L	GF	GA	GD	Pts
Japan	4	3	1	0	21	7	+14	7
Mongolia	4	3	0	1	24	7	+17	6
Ukraine	4	2	0	2	24	12	+12	4
Germany	4	1	1	2	30	16	+14	3
Somalia	4	0	0	4	2	59	−57	0

27 January 2014
Japan	2–1	Ukraine
Somalia	1–22	Germany
Mongolia	2–3	Japan
28 January 2014
Ukraine	13–0	Somalia
Mongolia	3–1	Germany
Japan	12–0	Somalia
Ukraine	2–7	Mongolia
29 January 2014
Germany	4–4 (0–1 penalties)	Japan
Somalia	1–12	Mongolia
Germany	3–8	Ukraine

- Matches in Group D are 60 minutes in duration rather than the standard 90 minutes

=== Knockout phase ===
Quarter-finals
30 January –
Latvia	9
Germany	3
30 January –
Netherlands	2
Japan	3
30 January –
Hungary	5
Mongolia	4
30 January –
Estonia	5
Ukraine	1

Semi-finals
31 January –
Latvia	8
Japan	0
31 January –
Hungary	2
Estonia	5

Final
1 February –
Latvia	8
Estonia	1
Third place
1 February –
Japan	2
Hungary	6

==== Quarterfinals ====
30 January 2014
Latvia	9–3	Germany
Estonia	5–1	Ukraine
Hungary	5–4	Mongolia
Netherlands	2–3	Japan

==== Match for 7th place (60 mins) ====
31 January 2014
Germany	5–4	Ukraine

==== Match for 5th place (60 mins) ====
31 January 2014
Mongolia	2–3	Netherlands

==== Match for 8th place (60 mins) ====
31 January 2014
Ukraine	13–1	Somalia

==== Semi-finals ====
31 January 2014
Latvia	8–0	Japan
Hungary	2–5	Estonia

==== Match for third place ====
1 February 2014
Japan	2–6	Hungary

==== Final ====
1 February 2014
Latvia	8–1	Estonia

=== Final standings ===
1.	Latvia
2.	Estonia
3.	Hungary
4.	Japan
5.	Netherlands
6.	Mongolia
7.	Germany
8.	Ukraine
9.	Somalia

== Sources ==
- Bandy World Championships 2014 Official Website (English and Russian)
- Federation of International Bandy Official Website (English)
