= Somalia national bandy team =

Somalia
- Association: Somali National Bandy Association
- Head coach: (Sweden) Per Fosshaug
- Captain: Hassan Bashir
- Most games: Mahmoud Raagi
- Top scorer: Mo Bullet
- Most points: Hassan Bashir
- Home stadium: Shafar Buush
- Team colors

First international
- Somalia 1–22 Germany; Irkutsk, 27 January 2014

Biggest win
- Somalia 15–0 Afghanistan; Borlänge, 25 February 2016

Biggest defeat
- Somalia 0–22 Latvia; Vänersborg, 24 January 2019

Bandy World Championship
- Appearances: 5 (first in 2014)
- Best result: 16th (2015, 2018)

Somalia national bandy team represents Somalia in the Bandy World Championship. It is controlled by the Somali National Bandy Association, which is a member of the Federation of International Bandy. The squad participated in the 2014 Bandy World Championship in Irkutsk, Russia, the first team from Africa to take part in bandy competitions. They participated in all following tournaments as well, consistently taking the last position.

== Background ==
All selected players, except an ice hockey player living in Canada, are Somali nationals who live in the Swedish town of Borlänge and play for the local club Borlänge Bandy (Borlänge-Stora Tuna BK, later renamed Peace & Love City). The team is coached by former Swedish international Per Fosshaug. Somalia national bandy team is financed by the municipality of Borlänge and Somali Olympic Committee. The project was launched in May 2013 and the team planned already by then to participate in at least two World Championship tournaments. This has been reported in media from around the world.

In the 2014 Bandy World Championship, the Somalia squad played in the Group D of Division B with Germany, Japan, Mongolia, and Ukraine. The tournament was played between 26 January and 2 February. In the first game, they lost to Germany 1–22, and consequently scored their first WCS goal. They subsequently lost all other games, scoring one more goal against Mongolia, and then one more in play-offs against Ukraine.

In 2016 and 2017, Somalia also played friendlies against an unofficial Afghanistan national bandy team. The Afghan team is created by Afghan expatriates in Karlstad, Sweden, but is not sanctioned by the sports governing bodies in Afghanistan, so it is not allowed to take part in the World Championship.

== Team 2014 squad ==
Somali squad at the 2014 World Championship in Irkutsk, Russia, 26 January – 2 February 2014.

Pos.	Age	Name	Club
GK	18	Mohamed Ahmed	(Sweden) Borlänge-Stora Tuna BK
GK	18	Farah Hassan	(Sweden) Borlänge-Stora Tuna BK
	17	Abdi Abdiirahiin	(Sweden) Borlänge-Stora Tuna BK
	19	Warsame Abdisalam	(Sweden) Borlänge-Stora Tuna BK
	16	Osman Salad Abdullahi	(Sweden) Borlänge-Stora Tuna BK
	15	Abdi Ahmed	(Sweden) Borlänge-Stora Tuna BK
	16	Ahmed Ahmed	(Sweden) Borlänge-Stora Tuna BK
	30	Bari Ahmed	(Sweden) Borlänge-Stora Tuna BK
	24	Deeq Abdulle Ahmed	(Sweden) Borlänge-Stora Tuna BK
	16	Warsame Alibashir	(Sweden) Borlänge-Stora Tuna BK
	17	Anwar Hared	(Canada) Aurora Tigers
	19	Ahmed Abdi Mohamed	(Sweden) Borlänge-Stora Tuna BK
	18	Ahmed Abdullahi Mohamed	(Sweden) Borlänge-Stora Tuna BK
	19	Abdi Mohamed Mohamud	(Sweden) Borlänge-Stora Tuna BK
	18	Ahmed Sadiiq	(Sweden) Borlänge-Stora Tuna BK
		Hussein Yoonis	(Sweden) Borlänge-Stora Tuna BK
