= Andrey Kabanov (bandy) =

Russian bandy player (born 1977)

Andrey Kabanov (born 2 March 1977) is a Russian bandy player with Belarusian descent. Therefore, his national team is Belarus. He has been playing in a number of club teams, since 2013 for Lokomotiv Orenburg. In the 2015 Bandy World Championship he was the top scorer.
