= Stroitel Stadium (Dimitrovgrad) =

Stroitel Stadium (Russian: Стадион «Строитель») is a bandy arena in Dimitrovgrad, Russia. It is the home arena of bandy club Cheremshan. Two games at the 2016 Bandy World Championship were played there. Artificial ice was planned to be installed before the event, but the preparations were way behind schedule. Governor Sergey Morozov expressed dissatisfaction with how the municipal authorities were handling the situation.
