= Sibselmash =

- City: Novosibirsk, Russia
- League: Russian Bandy Super League
- Founded: 1937; 89 years ago
- Home arena: Sibselmash Stadium (capacity: 8000)
- President: Trofimovich Alexander Valereivich
- CEO: Feodoseeyev Andrey Anatolievich
- Head coach: Petrovsky Kirill Vitaleivich
- Website: https://hcsibselmash.ru/
Home colours	Away colours

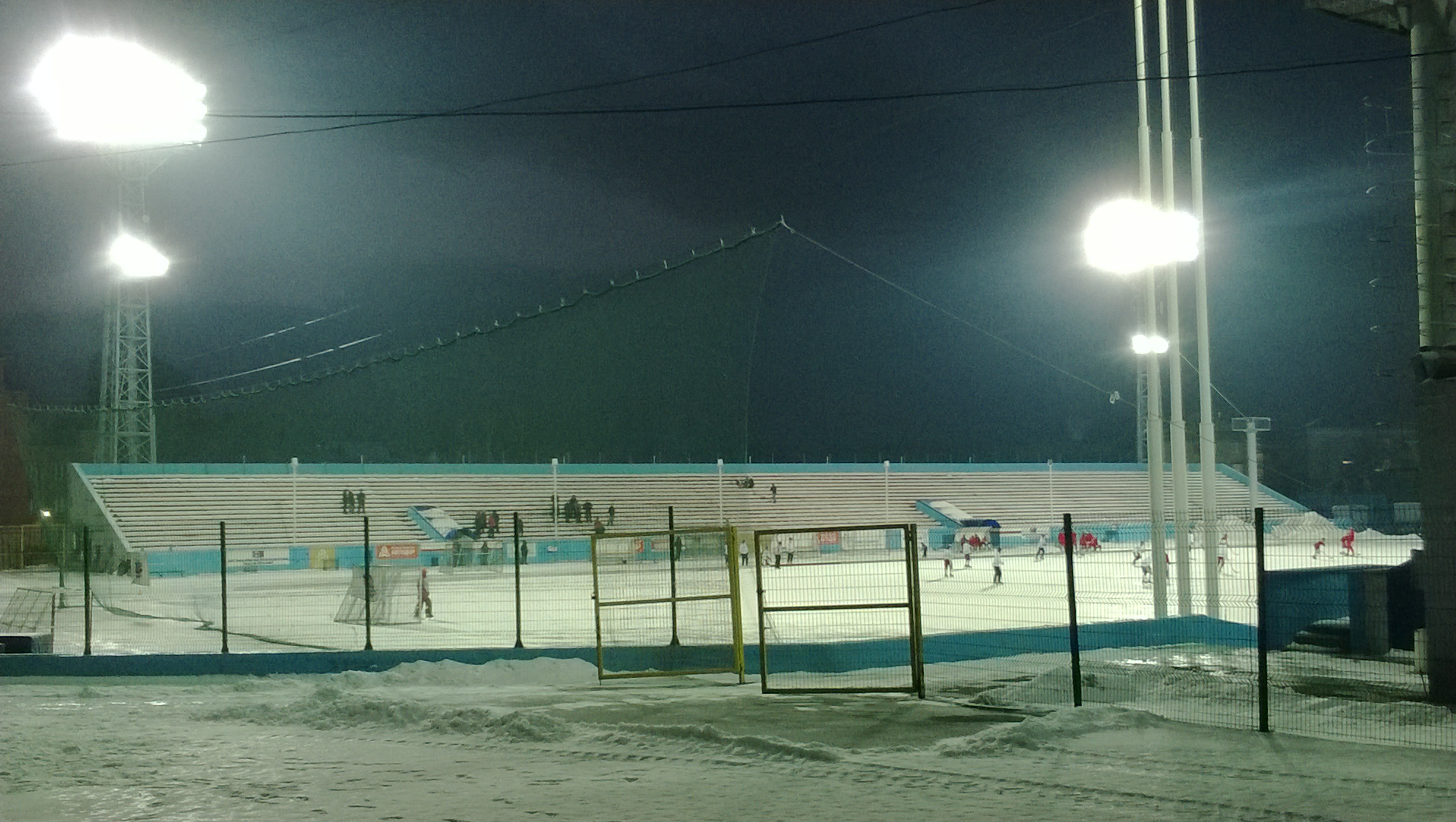
Sibselmash Stadium

Sibselmash (Russian: Сибсельмаш) is a bandy club from Novosibirsk, Russia. The team plays in the top Russian bandy league, the Super League. It was founded in 1937 and subsequently reestablished in 1974. The club colours are red and blue.

In the most recent (2026-27) season, the team did not get to a good start. They finished bottom of their group in the Russian Cup. They did not win or draw a single game, even being defeated by Sayany, a team considered to be the weakest in the league. At the end of the last season, a legend of Russian bandy, Pavel Ryazantsev, retired at Sibselmash at the age of 45. He was born in Novosibirsk and was a graduate of the Sibselmash academy, making his debut for them in 1998.

== Honours ==
=== Domestic ===
- Russian Champions:
  - Winners (1): 1995
  - Runners-up (4): 1994, 1996, 1997, 1998

== Sibselmash-2 ==
Sibselmash's second team Sibselmash-2 plays in the Russian Bandy Supreme League, the second tier of Russian bandy.

== In culture ==
The team's stadium is mentioned in the song Sibselmash by the post-punk band Ploho ("Dormitory, sixth floor, second building from Sibselmash Stadium").
