= Rodina Kirov =

Rodina
- City: Kirov, Russia
- League: Russian Bandy Super League
- Founded: 1934; 92 years ago
- Home arena: Rodina Stadium
Home colours	Away colours

Rodina (Russian: Родина) is a bandy club from Kirov, Russia whose team plays in the Russian Bandy Super League. It was founded in 1934. The club colours are white and blue.

The team was originally called Kutsho Factory Team and starting with 1941 Lepse Factory Team after the factory it belonged to. In 1957 it got its current name. It was defunct for seven years in 1967-1974, and didn't return to the top division until the 1980-81 season.

The team plays at the Rodina Stadium in Kirov.

== Rodina-2 ==
Rodina's second team Rodina-2 plays in the Russian Bandy Supreme League, the second tier of Russian bandy.
