= Yury Vikulin =

Russian professional bandy player (born 1986)

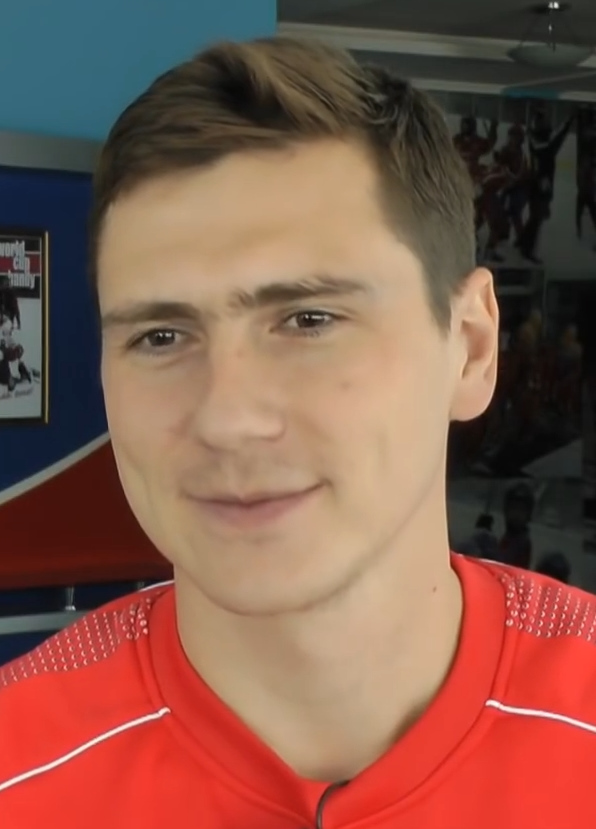
- Vikulin in 2016

Personal information
- Full name: Yury Igorevich Vikulin
- Date of birth: 15 January 1986 (age 39)

Senior career*
Years	Team	Apps^{†}	(Gls)^{†}
- Yenisey
Medal record
Men's bandy
Representing Russia
World Championships
Gold medal – first place	2016 Ulyanovsk	Team
Gold medal – first place	2018 Khabarovsk	Team
Silver medal – second place	2017 Sandviken	Team
- * Senior club appearances and goals counted for the domestic league only. † Appearances (Goals).

Yury Igorevich Vikulin (Russian: Юрий Игоревич Викулин; born 15 January 1986) is a Russian professional bandy player. He has played for the Yenisey since 2015 and has been part of the Russia national bandy team in many world championship competitions.
