= Volga-Sport-Arena =

Coordinates: 54.2979°N 48.3411°E

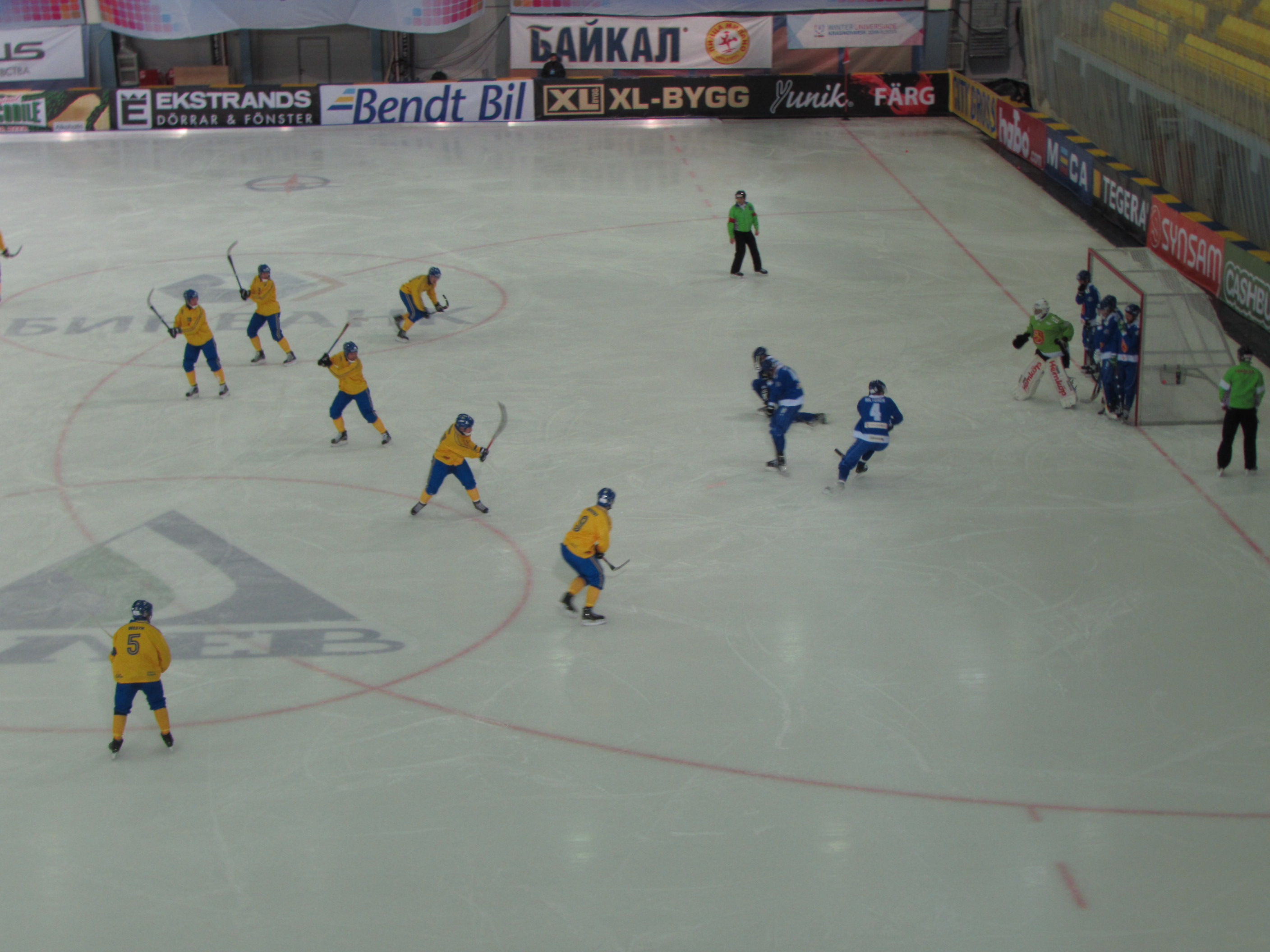
- Interactive map of Volga-Sport-Arena
- Location: Ulyanovsk, Russia
- Capacity: 3,504

Construction
- Opened: 2014

Tenant
- Volga

Volga-Sport-Arena is a sports venue in Ulyanovsk, Russia. It is the home of Volga. At the 2016 Bandy World Championship it hosted most of the matches.

Volga-Sport-Arena holds 3,504 seated spectators. The total area of the stadium is 23,000 m^{2} with an ice of 6,500 m^{2} or 100x60 m playing field. The decision to build it was taken in 2012 and it opened in 2014.

There is also a local bandy museum at the premises. At the time of the 2016 World Championship held here, plans were announced by Ulyanovsk Oblast Governor Sergey Morozov to make this a national museum for Russian bandy.
