= Sergey Sergeyevich Lomanov =

Russian bandy player (born 1980)

Sergey Lomanov
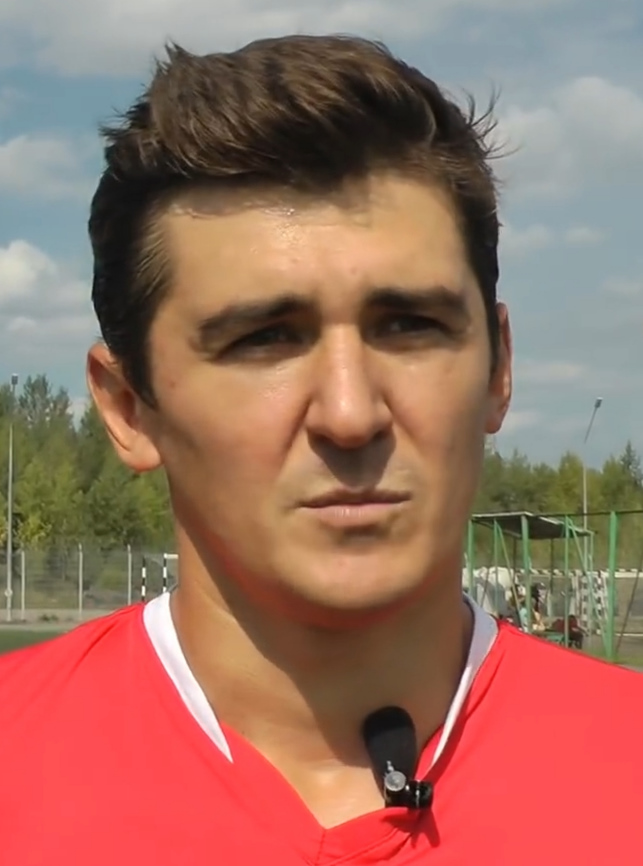
- Lomanov in 2018

Personal information
- Full name: Sergey Sergeyevich Lomanov
- Date of birth: 2 June 1980 (age 44)
- Place of birth: Krasnoyarsk, Russia
- Height: 1.86 m (6 ft 1 in)
- Playing position: Forward

Club information
- Current team: Yenisey
- Number: 7

Youth career
- IK Sirius
- Yenisey

Senior career*
Years	Team	Apps^{†}	(Gls)^{†}
1997–2005	Yenisey		
2005–2008	Dynamo Moscow		
2008–2016	Yenisey		
2016–2017	IFK Vänersborg		
2017–	Yenisey		

National team
1996–1997	Russia U17		
2000–2018	Russia		
Medal record
Men's bandy
Representing Russia
World Championships
Gold medal – first place	2014 Irkutsk	Team
Gold medal – first place	2016 Ulyanovsk	Team
Gold medal – first place	2018 Khabarovsk	Team
- * Senior club appearances and goals counted for the domestic league only. † Appearances (Goals).

Sergey Sergeyevich Lomanov (Russian: Сергей Сергеевич Ломанов; born 2 June 1980 in Krasnoyarsk) is a Russian bandy player (forward), currently playing for Yenisey. He has been team captain of Russia, but during the 2018–19 season declined to continue with the national team.

He is the son of Sergey Ivanovich Lomanov.

In 2016 he was part of the delegation received by President Vladimir Putin and was also selected as the best Russian Bandy Super League player for the fourth year in a row.

At the Opening Ceremony of the 2019 Winter Universiade he lit the fire, together with former gymnast Svetlana Khorkina. He was also an Ambassador of the Winter Universiade.

== Career ==
Lomanov started his career in Yenisey and made his senior debut in 1997. In 2005, he joined Dynamo Moscow, where he played for three seasons before returning to Yenisey in 2008. In 2016 he signed for IFK Vänersborg. He partly grew up in Sweden, when his father was playing for IK Sirius, and is fluent in Swedish.
