= Sayany-Khakassia =

- City: Abakan, Russia
- League: Russian Bandy Super League
- Founded: 1980; 46 years ago
- Home arena: Sayany Stadium
- Head coach: Nikolay Vasileivich Konovalov
Home colours	Away colours

Sayany-Khakassia, more widely known as Sayany (Russian: Саяны-Хакасия, Саяны) is a bandy club in Abakan, Russia, founded in 1980. The club was playing in the top-tier Super League in the 2012–13 season but was relegated to the second-tier Supreme League for the 2013–14 season. Until 2009 the name of the club was Sayany. Sayany-Khakassia entered the Russian Bandy Super League again in the 2025–26 season and finished in the last 12th place.
