= List of bandy clubs in Sweden =

Swedish bandy clubs play in the Swedish bandy league system, where the top-tier is Elitserien and lower levers are Allsvenskan, Division 1 and Division 2. The lower levels are in turn divided into groups based on geography.

The Swedish championship is decided through a play-off for the eight best teams in Elitserien each year; the Swedish championship has been played every year since 1907. There is also a Swedish domestic cup tournament, Svenska Cupen, since 2005.

Here is a list of clubs which have an article at the English Wikipedia:

Club	Home town	Founded	Home stadium	Champ.	Cup	League 2014–15
AIK	Solna	1891	Bergshamra IP	3		Division 2
Bollnäs GIF	Bollnäs	1897	Sävstaås IP	2		Elitserien
BS BolticGöta	Karlstad	2000				Allsvenskan
Broberg/Söderhamn Bandy	Söderhamn	1919	Hällåsen	5		Elitserien
Djurgårdens IF	Stockholm	1891	Spånga IP	2		Division 1
Edsbyns IF	Edsbyn	1909	Dina Arena	9	2	Elitserien
Falu BS	Falun	1935	Lugnets Isstadion	2		Division 1
GAIS	Gothenburg	1894	Heden			Elitserien
Gripen Trollhättan BK	Trollhättan	1936	Slättbergshallen			Allsvenskan
GT-76	Stockholm	1976	Gubbängens Idrottspark			Division 1
Hammarby IF	Stockholm	1897	Zinkensdamms IP	2	2	Elitserien
Ljusdals BK	Ljusdal	1943	Ljusdals IP	1		Elitserien
IFK Malmö	Malmö	1899	Sjöaltsvallen			Division 1
IFK Motala	Motala	1932	Motala Isstadion	1		Allsvenskan
Örebro SK	Örebro	1908	Vinterstadion	5		Allsvenskan
Sandvikens AIK	Sandviken	1901	Göransson Arena	9	5	Elitserien
Selånger SK	Sundsvall	1921				Allsvenskan
IK Sirius	Uppsala	1907	Studenternas IP	5		Elitserien
Slottsbrons IF	Slottsbron	1918		4		Division 1
IK Tellus	Stockholm	1921				Allsvenskan
Tillberga IK	Tillberga	1930	Rocklunda IP			Division 1
IFK Uppsala	Uppsala	1895	Studenternas IP			Division 2
Vetlanda BK	Vetlanda	1945	Sapa Arena	3		Elitserien
Villa Lidköping BK	Lidköping	1934	Sparbanken Lidköping Arena			Elitserien
IFK Vänersborg	Vänersborg	1903	Arena Vänersborg			Elitserien
Västerås SK	Västerås	1904	ABB Arena	18		Elitserien

== Defunct teams ==
- IF Boltic
- Oxelösunds IK
