= 2013–14 in Swedish bandy =

2013–14 in Swedish bandy was a bandy season starting in August 2013 and ending in July 2014.

== Honours ==
=== Men's bandy ===
==== Official titles ====
Title	Team	Reason
Swedish Champions 2014	Sandvikens AIK	Winners of Elitserien play-off
Swedish Cup Champions 2013	Hammarby IF	Winners of Svenska Cupen

==== Competitions ====
Level	Competition	Winning team
1st level	Elitserien 2013–14	Hammarby IF
2nd level	Allsvenskan Norra 2013–14	Tillberga IK
2nd level	Allsvenskan Södra 2013–14	Gripen Trollhättan BK
3rd level	Division 1 Norra 2013–14	Falu BS
3rd level	Division 1 Mellersta 2013–14	Köpings IS
3rd level	Division 1 Östra 2013–14	Helenelunds IK
3rd level	Division 1 Västra 2013–14	Mosseruds GF
3rd level	Division 1 Södra 2013–14	Skirö-Nävelsjö Bandy
Cup	Svenska Cupen 2013	Hammarby IF

=== Women's bandy ===
==== Official titles ====
Title	Team	Reason
Swedish Champions 2014	AIK	Winners of Damallsvenskan play-off

== Promotions, relegations and qualifications ==
=== Promotions ===
Promoted from	Promoted to	Team	Reason
Elitserie qualification 2014	Elitserien 2014–15	none	All Elitserien teams managed to re-qualify
Allsvenskan qualification 2014	Allsvenskan 2014–15	Finspångs AIK	Directly qualifying matches
Allsvenskan qualification 2014	Allsvenskan 2014–15	Köpings IS	Directly qualifying matches
Allsvenskan qualification 2014	Allsvenskan 2014–15	Skutskärs IF	Directly qualifying matches
Allsvenskan qualification 2014	Allsvenskan 2014–15	Falu BS	Directly qualifying matches
Allsvenskan qualification 2014	Allsvenskan 2014–15	Skirö-Nävelsjö Bandy	Secondary qualification

=== Relegations ===
Relegated from	Relegated to	Team	Reason
Elitserie qualification 2014	Allsvenskan	none	All Elitserien teams managed to re-qualify
Allsvenskan	Division 1 2014–15	Tjust IF	Lost matches in Allsvenskan qualification
Allsvenskan	Division 1 2014–15	Frillesås BK	12th team (last) in Allsvenskan Södra
Allsvenskan	Division 1 2014–15	Härnösands AIK	12th team (last) in Allsvenskan Norra
Allsvenskan	Division 1 2014–15	Selånger SK	11th team in Allsvenskan Norra
Allsvenskan	Division 1 2014–15	Åtvidabergs BK	11th team in Allsvenskan Södra

=== 2014 Elitserien play-offs ===
Final

16 March 2014

Sandvikens AIK	5–4	Västerås SK
Muhrén (2); Pettersson (2); Edlund	Report	Nilsson (2); Gröhn; Esplund

Friends Arena, Solna
Attendance: 20,497
Referee: Peter Öhrlund

== National teams ==
=== Sweden national bandy team ===
==== 2014 Bandy World Championship ====
In the 2014 Bandy World Championship, Sweden played in Division A, Group A. Sweden played the following matches and won the silver medals.

26 January 2014 Preliminary round	Sweden	9–1	Finland

27 January 2014 Preliminary round	Kazakhstan	2–11	Sweden

29 January 2014 Preliminary round	Russia	2–2 (3–1 penalties)	Sweden

30 January 2014 Quarter-final	Sweden	33–5	Belarus

2 February 2014 Semi-final	Sweden	4–3	Kazakhstan

3 February 2014 Final	Russia	3–2	Sweden

=== Sweden women's national bandy team ===
==== 2014 Women's Bandy World Championship ====
In the 2014 Women's Bandy World Championship, Sweden played the following matches and won the silver medals, for the first time not becoming world champions.

19 February 2014 Preliminary round	Sweden	5–0	United States
08:30 (EET)

19 February 2014 Preliminary round	Norway	0–6	Sweden
17:00 (EET)

20 February 2014 Preliminary round	Sweden	3–1	Canada
10:30 (EET)

20 February 2014 Preliminary round	Finland	0–3	Sweden
19:00 (EET)

21 February 2014 Preliminary round	Sweden	1–3	Russia
12:30(EET)

21 February 2014 Semi-final	Sweden	4–2	Finland

22 February 2014 Final	Russia	3–1	Sweden

== See also ==
- 2013–14 Elitserien (bandy)
- Swedish bandy league system
