= 2013–14 Elitserien (bandy) =

2013–14 Elitserien season
- League: (Sweden) Elitserien
- Sport: Bandy
- Duration: 25 October 2013 – 16 March 2014
- Number of teams: 14
- TV partner(s): TV4 and TV4 Sport

Regular season
- League winner: Hammarby IF

Final
- Champions: Sandvikens AIK
- Runners-up: Västerås SK

Elitserien seasons
- ← 2012–13 2014–15 →

The 2013-14 Elitserien was the seventh season of the Swedish bandy league Elitserien. The final was played at Friends Arena in Solna on 16 March 2014. Sandvikens AIK claimed the championship.

== Teams ==
Team	Location	Home stadium
Bollnäs GIF	Bollnäs	Sävstaås IP
Broberg/Söderhamn Bandy	Söderhamn	Hällåsen
Edsbyns IF	Edsbyn	Dina Arena
GAIS	Gothenburg	Arena Heden
Hammarby IF	Stockholm	Zinkensdamms IP
IFK Kungälv	Kungälv	Skarpe Nord
Ljusdals BK	Ljusdal	Gamla Idrottsparken
Kalix BF	Kalix	Kalix IP
Sandvikens AIK	Sandviken	Göransson Arena
IK Sirius	Uppsala	Studenternas IP
Vetlanda BK	Vetlanda	Sapa Arena
Villa Lidköping BK	Lidköping	Sparbanken Lidköping Arena
IFK Vänersborg	Vänersborg	Arena Vänersborg
Västerås SK	Västerås	ABB Arena

== League table ==
Pos	Team	Pld	W	D	L	GF	GA	GD	Pts	
1	Hammarby IF	26	21	3	2	149	85	+64	45	Advance to Knock-out stage
2	Sandvikens AIK	26	20	3	3	192	100	+92	43	Advance to Knock-out stage
3	Villa Lidköping BK	26	18	4	4	156	97	+59	40	Advance to Knock-out stage
4	Västerås SK	26	16	2	8	132	92	+40	34	Advance to Knock-out stage
5	Edsbyns IF	26	15	4	7	142	116	+26	34	Advance to Knock-out stage
6	IFK Vänersborg	26	13	5	8	133	96	+37	31	Advance to Knock-out stage
7	Broberg/Söderhamn	26	12	5	9	117	113	+4	29	Advance to Knock-out stage
8	Vetlanda BK	26	9	4	13	119	126	−7	22	Advance to Knock-out stage
9	IFK Kungälv	26	7	4	15	96	122	−26	18	
10	Bollnäs GIF	26	5	7	14	89	113	−24	17	
11	GAIS	26	6	3	17	80	104	−24	15	Qualification to Relegation playoffs
12	Kalix Bandy	26	4	5	17	74	126	−52	13	Qualification to Relegation playoffs
13	IK Sirius	26	4	5	17	72	160	−88	13	Qualification to Relegation playoffs
14	Ljusdals BK	26	3	4	19	52	153	−101	10	Qualification to Relegation playoffs

Updated to match(es) played on completed. Source:

=== Knock-out stage ===
A best-of-five playoff were used in the quarter-finals and semi-finals. The crucial final was played at Friends Arena in Solna, Stockholm on 16 March 2014.

Quarter-finals
Sandvikens AIK	11	5	11	4	5
Broberg/Söderhamn	7	6	2	5	2
Villa Lidköping BK	5	6	7
Edsbyns IF	3	4	4
Hammarby IF	4	5	6
Vetlanda BK	2	3	2
Västerås SK	3	3	9	7	7
IFK Vänersborg	9	5	5	3	2

Semi-finals
Sandvikens AIK	6	5	8
Villa Lidköping BK	5	4	7
Hammarby IF	3	3	5	5
Västerås SK	6	6	3	6

Final
16 March – Solna
Sandvikens AIK	5
Västerås SK	4

==== Final ====
16 March 2014
15:00 UTC+1

Sandvikens AIK	5–4	Västerås SK
Muhrén 9', 50'; Pettersson 13', 54'; Edlund 57'	Report	Gröhn 35'; Nilsson 76', 90'; Esplund 81' (pen)

Friends Arena, Solna
Attendance: 20,497
Referee: Peter Öhrlund (Västerås)

The championship trophy was handed over by Prince Daniel, Duke of Västergötland.

== Season statistics ==
=== Top scorers ===
As of end of season.

Rank	Player	Club	Goals
1	(Sweden) Christoffer Edlund	Sandvikens AIK	73
2	(Sweden) David Karlsson	Villa Lidköping BK	57
3	(Sweden) Joakim Hedqvist	IFK Vänersborg	56
4	(Sweden) Erik Pettersson	Sandvikens AIK	49
5	(Sweden) Jonas Nilsson	Västerås SK	40
6	(Sweden) Patrik Nilsson	Hammarby IF	39
7	(Sweden) Mattias Hammarström	Edsbyns IF	35
8	(Sweden) Joakim Andersson	Vetlanda BK	33
9	(Sweden) Daniel Andersson	Villa Lidköping BK	31
9	(Sweden) Jonas Edling	Edsbyns IF	31

== See also ==
- 2013–14 in Swedish bandy
