= 2014–15 Elitserien (bandy) =

2014–15 Elitserien season
- League: (Sweden) Elitserien
- Sport: Bandy
- Duration: 24 October 2014 – 14 March 2015
- Number of teams: 14
- TV partner(s): TV4 and TV4 Sport

Regular season
- League winners: Sandvikens AIK

Final
- Champions: Västerås SK
- Runners-up: Sandvikens AIK

Elitserien seasons
- ← 2013–14 2015–16 →

The 2014–15 Elitserien was the eighth season of the present highest Swedish men's bandy top division, Elitserien. The regular season began on 24 October 2014, and the final was played at Tele2 Arena in Stockholm on 14 March 2015.

== Summary ==
- At the end of the former season, it looked like the fourteen teams in the league would be the same as last season, because no Allsvenskan team was able to win enough games in the qualification series in March 2014. GAIS was qualified for continued play in Elitserien, but made a decision to withdraw in May 2014. The Swedish Bandy Association first offered the vacancy to Gripen Trollhättan BK based on the competitive results in the last season, but then this club was deemed not to fulfill the economic demands of a club in Elitserien, so instead the Bandy Association decided that Tillberga IK will fill the place.
- On 17 September 2014, it was announced that the final will be moved from the Friends Arena to the Tele2 Arena.
- On 21 October 2014, it was announced that a third prize game will be introduced from the 2014–15 season.

== Teams ==
Locations of the 2014–15 Elitserien teams

Team	Location	Home stadium
Bollnäs GIF	Bollnäs	Sävstaås IP
Broberg/Söderhamn Bandy	Söderhamn	Hällåsen
Edsbyns IF	Edsbyn	Dina Arena
Hammarby IF	Stockholm	Zinkensdamms IP
IFK Kungälv	Kungälv	Skarpe Nord
Ljusdals BK	Ljusdal	Ljusdals IP
Kalix BF	Kalix	Kalix IP
Sandvikens AIK	Sandviken	Göransson Arena
IK Sirius	Uppsala	Studenternas IP
Tillberga IK	Västerås	ABB Arena
Vetlanda BK	Vetlanda	Sapa Arena
Villa Lidköping BK	Lidköping	Sparbanken Lidköping Arena
IFK Vänersborg	Vänersborg	Arena Vänersborg
Västerås SK	Västerås	ABB Arena

== League table ==
Pos	Team	Pld	W	D	L	GF	GA	GD	Pts	
1	Sandvikens AIK	26	20	2	4	191	99	+92	42	Advance to Knock-out stage
2	Västerås SK	26	19	3	4	179	100	+79	41	Advance to Knock-out stage
3	Edsbyns IF	26	16	5	5	134	86	+48	37	Advance to Knock-out stage
4	Hammarby IF	26	16	3	7	140	102	+38	35	Advance to Knock-out stage
5	Bollnäs GIF	26	15	4	7	103	95	+8	34	Advance to Knock-out stage
6	Villa Lidköping BK	26	12	7	7	161	110	+51	31	Advance to Knock-out stage
7	IFK Vänersborg	26	12	7	7	124	97	+27	31	Advance to Knock-out stage
8	Broberg/Söderhamn	26	13	4	9	112	101	+11	30	Advance to Knock-out stage
9	Vetlanda BK	26	8	6	12	110	131	−21	22	
10	Kalix Bandy	26	8	2	16	82	120	−38	18	
11	IFK Kungälv	26	7	4	15	90	134	−44	18	Qualification to Relegation playoffs
12	IK Sirius	26	5	3	18	85	148	−63	13	Qualification to Relegation playoffs
13	Ljusdals BK	26	3	2	21	66	152	−86	8	Qualification to Relegation playoffs
14	Tillberga IK	26	1	2	23	73	175	−102	4	Qualification to Relegation playoffs

Updated to match(es) played on completed. Source:

=== Knock-out stage ===
Quarter-finals
Sandvikens AIK	3	6	7
Broberg/Söderhamn	1	1	1
Hammarby IF	9	7	6	11
IFK Vänersborg	8	8	1	4
Västerås SK	3	3	8	3
Bollnäs GIF	2	5	3	2
Edsbyns IF	1	1	2
Villa Lidköping BK	4	6	4

Semi-finals
Sandvikens AIK	3	8	7	7	7
Hammarby IF	4	10	2	1	5
Västerås SK	5	7	8
Villa Lidköping BK	1	2	0

Final
14 March – Stockholm
Sandvikens AIK	4
Västerås SK	6

==== Final ====
14 March 2015
16:30 UTC+1

Sandvikens AIK	4–6	Västerås SK
P. Nilsson 45+1', 53'; Säfström 73', 82'	Report	Holmberg 17'; Olsson 21'; Nilsson 45+2', 51', 65'; Rintala 90+2'

Tele2 Arena, Stockholm
Attendance: 15,877
Referee: Mikael Karlsson

=== Relegation play-offs ===
==== Group A ====
Pos	Team	Pld	W	D	L	GF	GA	GD	Pts	
1	IFK Kungälv	6	5	1	0	30	12	+18	11	Promotion to Elitserien
2	Tillberga IK	6	3	2	1	28	16	+12	8	Promotion to Elitserien
3	Katrineholm Värmbol BS	6	1	1	4	23	32	−9	3	Relegation to Allsvenskan
4	Nässjö IF	6	1	0	5	16	37	−21	2	Relegation to Allsvenskan

Updated to match(es) played on completed. Source:

==== Group B ====
Pos	Team	Pld	W	D	L	GF	GA	GD	Pts	
1	Gripen Trollhättan BK	6	4	1	1	32	12	+20	9	Promotion to Elitserien
2	IK Sirius	6	4	0	2	29	22	+7	8	Promotion to Elitserien
3	Ljusdals BK	6	3	1	2	20	17	+3	7	Relegation to Allsvenskan
4	Falu BS	6	0	0	6	17	47	−30	0	Relegation to Allsvenskan

Updated to match(es) played on completed. Source:
