= 2018 Bandy World Championship squads =

Below are the squads for the 2018 Bandy World Championship final tournament in Russia.

== Division A ==
=== Group A ===
==== Finland ====
Coach: Antti Parviainen

No.	Pos.	Player	Date of birth (age)	Caps	Club
4	FW	Jimi Heinonen	1 March 1996 (aged 21)	2	(Sweden) Sirius
6	MF	Teemu Määttä	24 January 1992 (aged 26)	32	(Sweden) Sirius
7	MF	Ville-Veikko Angeria	16 March 1985 (aged 32)	32	(Finland) Akilles
10	DF	Niko Nissinen	26 August 1994 (aged 23)	5	(Finland) WP-35
11	FW	Markus Kumpuoja	21 November 1988 (aged 29)	77	(Sweden) Sirius
14	MF	Samuli Helavuori	3 April 1991 (aged 26)	57	(Sweden) Bollnäs
20	MF	Juho Liukkonen	9 September 1984 (aged 33)	51	(Sweden) IFK Vänersborg
21	MF	Tuomas Liukkonen	21 March 1992 (aged 25)	12	(Sweden) Kalix
22	DF	Ville Aaltonen	17 May 1979 (aged 38)	146	(Sweden) Bollnäs
23	GK	Kimmo Kyllönen	11 May 1983 (aged 34)	58	(Sweden) IFK Vänersborg
46	DF	Ilari Moisala	9 January 1985 (aged 33)	83	(Sweden) Broberg/Söderhamn
51	MF	Antti Ekman	8 September 1982 (aged 35)	66	(Finland) LRK
66	DF	Tommi Määttä	17 April 1996 (aged 21)	9	(Sweden) Edsbyn
72	GK	Pertti Virtanen	17 July 1986 (aged 31)	42	(Finland) OLS
74	MF	Eetu Peuhkuri	3 November 1990 (aged 27)	30	(Finland) Veiterä
87	FW	Mikko Lukkarila	24 June 1987 (aged 30)	92	(Sweden) IFK Vänersborg
99	MF	Tuomas Määttä	17 April 1996 (aged 21)	30	(Sweden) Edsbyn

==== Norway ====
Coach:

No.	Pos.	Player	Date of birth (age)	Caps	Club
2	DF	Anders Greger Svenn	10 April 1990 (aged 27)	20	(Sweden) IFK Kungälv
3	DF	Sverre Jacob Brecheisen	24 September 1988 (aged 29)	20	(Norway) Stabæk
4	DF	Peder Remman	15 April 1992 (aged 25)	22	(Sweden) Surte
5	DF	Petter Renstrøm Moen	14 January 1982 (aged 36)	51	(Norway) Solberg
6	MF	Petter Yngve Løyning	2 September 1989 (aged 28)	32	(Norway) Stabæk
8	MF	Magnus Høgevold	3 November 1986 (aged 31)	54	(Norway) Stabæk
9	MF	Nikolai Rustad Jensen	15 April 1990 (aged 27)	39	(Sweden) Villa Lidköping
10	MF	Christian Randsborg	4 April 1985 (aged 32)	50	(Norway) Stabæk
11	FW	Sondre Bratvold Kristoffersen	27 July 1993 (aged 24)	18	(Norway) Solberg
12	GK	Alexander Nygaard	28 July 1986 (aged 31)	17	(Norway) Stabæk
15	FW	Carl Isac Jerner	8 September 1995 (aged 22)	0	(Norway) Ready
16	MF	Robin Nicolay Cras	21 September 1989 (aged 28)	39	(Norway) Mjøndalen
17	MF	Kristian Hagen	17 May 1996 (aged 21)	9	(Sweden) Nässjö
18	MF	Fritiof Hagberg	19 May 1996 (aged 21)	9	(Sweden) Broberg/Söderhamn
19	FW	Felix Callander	15 October 1998 (aged 19)	10	(Sweden) IFK Vänersborg
20	GK	Simen Lycke Kjøllmoen	29 July 1996 (aged 21)	12	(Norway) Høvik
21	MF	Eirik Bø Johnsen	13 January 1990 (aged 28)	28	(Norway) Solberg

==== Russia ====
Coach: Mikhail Iurev

No.	Pos.	Player	Date of birth (age)	Caps	Club
1	GK	Roman Chernykh	15 September 1984 (aged 33)		(Russia) Yenisey
5	FW	Artem Bondarenko	1 April 1986 (aged 31)		(Russia) SKA-Neftyanik
7	FW	Sergey Lomanov	2 June 1980 (aged 37)		(Russia) Yenisey
8	MF	Maxim Ishkeldin	22 June 1990 (aged 27)		(Russia) SKA-Neftyanik
10	FW	Almaz Mirgazov	23 July 1992 (aged 25)		(Russia) Yenisey
11	MF	Vadim Chernov	26 November 1994 (aged 23)		(Russia) Yenisey
15	MF	Alan Dzhusoev	7 April 1992 (aged 25)		(Sweden) Hammarby
18	MF	Sergei Shaburov	27 July 1978 (aged 39)		(Russia) Dynamo Moscow
20	MF	Janis Befus	17 January 1992 (aged 26)		(Russia) SKA-Neftyanik
21	MF	Yury Shardakov	14 March 1990 (aged 27)		(Russia) SKA-Neftyanik
23	FW	Evgeny Dergaev	31 October 1988 (aged 29)		(Russia) Vodnik
24	DF	Yury Vikulin	15 January 1986 (aged 32)		(Russia) Yenisey
27	DF	Vasily Granovsky	16 August 1985 (aged 32)		(Russia) SKA-Neftyanik
28	FW	Vladimir Kalanchin	17 February 1997 (aged 20)		(Russia) Kuzbass
30	GK	Denis Rysev	17 October 1986 (aged 31)		(Russia) SKA-Neftyanik
32	DF	Pavel Bulatov	23 May 1983 (aged 34)		(Russia) Dynamo Moscow
33	MF	Andrey Prokopiev	16 August 1992 (aged 25)		(Russia) Yenisey
44	MF	Vadim Arkhipkin	15 September 1990 (aged 27)		(Sweden) Broberg/Söderhamn
55	DF	Mikhail Prokopiev	21 December 1989 (aged 28)		(Russia) Yenisey

==== Sweden ====
Coach: Svenne Olsson

No.	Pos.	Player	Date of birth (age)	Caps	Club
4	DF	Per Hellmyrs	18 March 1983 (aged 34)		(Sweden) Bollnäs
5	DF	Andreas Westh	22 May 1977 (aged 40)		(Sweden) Bollnäs
6	MF	Daniel Berlin	22 March 1987 (aged 30)		(Sweden) Sandviken
8	DF	Hans Andersson	13 March 1982 (aged 35)		(Sweden) Edsbyn
9	MF	Johan Löfstedt	10 November 1986 (aged 31)		(Sweden) Vetlanda
11	DF	David Pizzoni Elfving	26 November 1985 (aged 32)		(Sweden) Hammarby
13	GK	Patrik Hedberg	13 April 1988 (aged 29)		(Sweden) Hammarby
15	DF	Linus Pettersson	13 May 1987 (aged 30)		(Sweden) Sandviken
16	DF	Erik Säfström	8 May 1988 (aged 29)		(Sweden) Sandviken
18	FW	Joakim Andersson	13 March 1993 (aged 24)		(Sweden) Vetlanda
21	FW	Christoffer Edlund	2 March 1987 (aged 30)		(Sweden) Sandviken
24	DF	Martin Johansson	20 July 1987 (aged 30)		(Sweden) Villa Lidköping
40	MF	Adam Gilljam	8 July 1990 (aged 27)		(Sweden) Hammarby
42	GK	Anders Svensson	11 June 1975 (aged 42)		(Sweden) Edsbyn
45	FW	Christoffer Fagerström	23 September 1992 (aged 25)		(Sweden) Hammarby
75	MF	Jesper Eriksson	20 September 1983 (aged 34)		(Sweden) Villa Lidköping
94	MF	Simon Jansson	17 January 1991 (aged 27)		(Sweden) Västerås
95	FW	Erik Pettersson	22 July 1995 (aged 22)		(Russia) Yenisey

=== Group B ===
==== Germany ====
Coach: Dmitry Fihter

No.	Pos.	Player	Date of birth (age)	Caps	Club
	GK	Victor Rud			(Germany) Rhein-Main Eissportclub
	GK	Ingmar Schlegel			(Germany) Rhein-Main Eissportclub
		Eugen Kudrin			(Germany) Rhein-Main Eissportclub
		Pavel Lytayev			(Germany) Rhein-Main Eissportclub
		Sergey Naab			(Germany) Rhein-Main Eissportclub
		Andrey Felker			(Russia) Dynamo Mayak
		Sergey Zaitsev			(Germany) Rhein-Main Eissportclub
		Theo Hawke			(Norway) Ullevål IL
		Mikhail Dunaev			(Russia) Dynamo Mayak
		Davyd Kyle			(Germany) Rhein-Main Eissportclub
		Alexander Kolyagin			(Russia) Dynamo Mayak
		Alexander Kuznetsov			(Russia) Dynamo Mayak
		Dimitry Kuzmin			(Germany) Rhein-Main Eissportclub
		Hauke Sander			(Germany) Rhein-Main Eissportclub
		Alexey Tsygankov			(Germany) Rhein-Main Eissportclub
		Niklas Laue			(Germany) Rhein-Main Eissportclub
		Paul Ewald			(Russia) Krylatskoe-Moscow
		Emil Hawke			(Norway) Ullevål IL

==== Hungary ====
Coach: Gábor Nagy

No.	Pos.	Player	Date of birth (age)	Caps	Club
	GK	Tibor Botlik			
	GK	Kristian Marosi			(Sweden) UNIK BK
		Tamás Mezőcsáti			(Hungary) Újpesti TE Amatőr
		Linus Schellin			(Hungary) FTC
		Dennis Pacsai			(Sweden) IFK Motala
		Botond Frajka			(Hungary) Budapest Rangers
		Barnabás Szűcs			(Hungary) Budapest Rangers
		Péter Jankovics			(Hungary) Újpesti TE Amatőr
		Dániel Bata			
		Norbert Muzsik			(Hungary) Újpesti TE Amatőr
		Tamás Gál			(Hungary) Újpesti TE Amatőr
		Dávid Molnár			(Hungary) Budapest Rangers
		Norbert Fekecs			(Hungary) MAC
		András Kordisz			(Hungary) MAC
		Ludvig von Polgar			(Sweden) IFK Uppsala
		Alexei Homenko			(Hungary) Újpesti TE Amatőr

==== Kazakhstan ====
Coach: Ilyas Khandayev

No.	Pos.	Player	Date of birth (age)	Caps	Club
	GK	Andrey Raine			(Russia) Dynamo Moscow
	GK	Nariman Takirov			(Kazakhstan) Akzhayik
		Anatoly Golubkov			(Russia) Zorky
		Ivan Kozlov			(Russia) Vodnik
		Denis Maksimenko			(Russia) Start
		Maxim Ryazanov			(Russia) Volga
		Roman Sukhorukov			(Russia) Vodnik
		Leonid Bedarev			(Russia) Zorky
		Artem Vshivkov			(Russia) Sibselmash
		Ruslan Galyautdinov			(Russia) Volga
		Peter Gribanov			(Kazakhstan) Akzhayik
		Andrey Gushchin			(Kazakhstan) Akzhayik
		Vasily Zhaukenov			(Russia) Kuzbass
		Dmitriy Zavidovsky			(Russia) Zorky
		Rauan Isaliyev			(Russia) Sibselmash
		Sultan Kadirjanov			(Kazakhstan) Akzhayik
		Evgeny Leonov			(Russia) Sibselmash
		Vyacheslav Markin			(Russia) Uralsky Trubnik
		Anton Hrapenkov			(Sweden) Kalix BF
		Iskander Nugmanov			(Norway) Høvik IF
		Sergei Pochkunov			(Russia) Uralsky Trubnik
		Maxim Utebaliev			(Kazakhstan) Akzhayik

==== United States ====
Coach: Chris Halden

No.	Pos.	Player	Date of birth (age)	Caps	Club
	GK	Gavin Ancheta			(United States) Tonka Bay Bombers
	GK	Eric Kraska			(United States) Dinkytown Dukes
	GK	Zack Wynne			(United States) Dynamo Duluth
		Wyatt Wenzel			(United States) Minneapolis Bandolier
		Alexander Zitouni			(Sweden) IFK Vänersborg
		Zach Knight			(United States) Minneapolis Bandolier
		Macklin Williams			(United States) Tonka Bay Bombers
		Jacob Blücher			(Sweden) Unik
		Peter Knutson			(United States) Minneapolis Bandolier
		Mike Carman			(United States) Mississippi Mojo
		Mikael Lickteig			(United States) Tonka Bay Bombers
		Greg Olson			(United States) Dinkytown Dukes
		Darren Richardson			(Sweden) Jönköping Bandy
		Dane Erickson			(United States) Minneapolis Bandolier
		Kevin Brown			(Sweden) Peace & Love City
		Murphy Dwyer			(United States) Tonka Bay Bombers
		Andrew Knutson			(United States) Minneapolis Bandolier

== Division B ==
=== Group A ===
==== China ====
Coach: Li BinDong

No.	Pos.	Player	Date of birth (age)	Caps	Club
	GK	Geng Yi			
	GK	Wu Jiankun			
	GK	Zhou Tongzhe			
		Liu Fujia			
		Wang Keyao			
		Yunfan Daniel Zhang			
		Johan Zhang			
		Huang Peng			
		Yue Xinhao			
		Wu Jiasiteng			
		Yu Mingrunze			
		Zhang Zhen			
		Lu Hengnan			
		Meng You			
		Qian Jinglin			
		Zhang Jiaqi			
		Nan Xiaoming			
		Wu Hao			
		Ma Tianyue			
		Jin Shenjie			
		Zhang Ludao			
		Yang Huai			

==== Estonia ====
Coach: Artem Abramov

No.	Pos.	Player	Date of birth (age)	Caps	Club
	GK	Jevgeni Maksimov			
		Vladislav Andreev			(Russia) Krylatskoye-Dinamo
		Stanislav Pankov			
		Pavel Safonov			
		Dmitri Kabatsikov			
		Aleksander Kaidash			
		Ilja Kolesnikov			
		Argo Servet			
		Urmas Rohtla			
		Edgar Baranin			
		Jasper Jürisson			
		Emil Kaup			(Sweden) TB Västerås
		Denis Kudrjavtsev			
		Aleks Randmer			
		Edgar Miljajev			
		Vadim Volin			
		Aleksei Ibatulov			(Finland) WP-35

==== Japan ====
Coach: Oleg Zignnshin

No.	Pos.	Player	Date of birth (age)	Caps	Club
	GK	Kenji Yoneda			
	GK	Kazuaki Muramoto			
	MF	Gen Ishioka			
	FW	Yasunori Kusumoto			
	MF	Masahide Kaneko			
	MF	Hironori Aihara			
	DF	Jin Ishioka			
	FW	Yohsuke Kondoh			
	DF	Daisuke Sasaki			
	GK	Yu Yamanouchi			
	MF	Shigeto Nagane			
	DF	Kenji Otani			
	DF	Kosuke Asano			
	MF	Kazuma Hira			
	MF	Toma Yamauchi			
	MF	Musashi Nakai			
	MF	So Kobayashi			

==== Mongolia ====
Coach: Mergen Arslan

No.	Pos.	Player	Date of birth (age)	Caps	Club
	GK	Munkhbold Bayarsaikhan			
	MF	Tamir Ganbold			
	FW	Bayarsaikhan Jargalsaikhan			
	MF	Shinebayar Tsogtoo			
	MF	Altangerel Ichinnorow			
	DF	Boldbayar Bayajikh			
	FW	Mungunkhuyag Dawaadorj			
	DF	Ganochir Tseween			
	GK	Ganholboo Borkhuu			
	MF	Gerelt Ider			
	DF	Batgerel Zorigt			
	DF	Erdenesukh Bold			
	MF	Batbaysgalan Baatar			
	MF	Enchbayar Ochirpurev			
	MF	Tserenbaljir Baatarkhuu			
	MF	Bataarhuu Bazarvaani			

=== Group B ===
==== Netherlands ====
Coach: Thomas Engström

No.	Pos.	Player	Date of birth (age)	Caps	Club
	GK	Marc Perenboom			
	GK	Thomas Jeukens			
		David van Alst			
		Edwin de Bie			
		Jordan Braam			
		Stephan den Brok			
		Alexander Cras			(Norway) Mjøndalen IF
		Stefan Geenen			
		Rick de Grood			
		Twan Hengst			
		Johan Kuhnen			
		Remo Speijers			
		Bou Tveitan			
		Sverre Tveitan			
		Nick Verbruaaen			
		Joris Vriezen			
		Pepijn Weesenaar			
		Mees van Wiichen			

==== Slovakia ====
Coach: Mikael Bratt

No.	Pos.	Player	Date of birth (age)	Caps	Club
	GK	Michal Hanic			
	GK	Daniel Kmošena			
	GK	Marcel Ďurech			
		Miroslav Krídl			
		Martin Korpáš			
		Peter Beneš			
		Matej Michalovič			
		Martin Bernát			
		Dominik Blišťan			
		Kristián Lukšo			
		Adam Mikovíny			
		Marek Nezník			
		Dominik Rusnák			
		Tomáš Šebesta			
		Oliver štofik			
		Branislav Volko			
		Boris Deneš			

==== Somalia ====
Coach: Mursal Ismail Isa

No.	Pos.	Player	Date of birth (age)	Caps	Club
		Hassan Hamsa Farah			
		Liban Abdiqadir Aden			
		Abd ullahi Duaale Jimaale			
		Ahmed Deeq Abdulle			
		Bilal Mohamed Nuur			
		Mohamud Abdi Mohamed			
		Abdirahmaan Mohamed Barkhadle			
		Anwar Hared			
		Abdi Kahiin Mohamed Abdi			
		Mowliid Abdi Ibrahim			
		Omar Abdullahi Omar			
		Sadiiq Kaysa Ahmed			
		Ahmed Mahamed Ahmed			
		Mohamed Abdirisaq Ahmed			
		Ahmed Abdirisaq Ahmed			
		Sakeria Kaysa Ahmed			
		Imran Abdirahman Jeele			

==== Ukraine ====
Coach: Magnus Alm

No.	Pos.	Player	Date of birth (age)	Caps	Club
	GK	Andrii Kurudz			(Ukraine) Dnipro Dnipropetrovsk
	GK	Hennadii Babenko			(Ukraine) Dnipro Dnipropetrovsk
		Oleksandr Badamshyn			(Ukraine) Vyshhorod
		Sergii Mozgovoi			(Ukraine) Dnipro Dnipropetrovsk
		Denys Shevelev			
		Dmytro Tsymbal			(Ukraine) Street Hockey Kiev
		Andrey Markovichenkol			(Russia) Stroitel Murmansk
		Roman Levchenko			(Russia) Sever Severodvinsk
		Mykhailo Riabov			
		Oleh Chykariev			(Ukraine) Shturm Zholtyye Vody
		Artem Zuyenko			
		Mikita Shendrik			
		Anton Lozovoi			(Ukraine) Dnipro Dnipropetrovsk
		Ivan Shvedchenko			(Ukraine) Dnipro Dnipropetrovsk
		Kostiantyn Pimkin			
		Igor Mikhailov			
