= David Carlsson =

David Carlsson may refer to:

- David Carlsson (bandy) (born 1983), Swedish bandy player for Vetlanda BK
- David Carlsson (footballer) (born 1983), Swedish footballer

== See also ==
- David Karlsson (disambiguation)
