= Narukerä =

- City: Pori, Satakunta, Finland
- League: Bandyliiga
- Founded: 1965; 61 years ago
- Home arena: Porin tekojäärata (capacity: 500)
- Colors
- Head coach: Tuomas Erkkilä
- Asst. coaches: Juha-Matti Aaltola; Petteri Joukamaa
- Website: https://www.porinnarukera.fi/

Championships
- Finnish championship: 1999, 2023
- Finnish cup: 2023

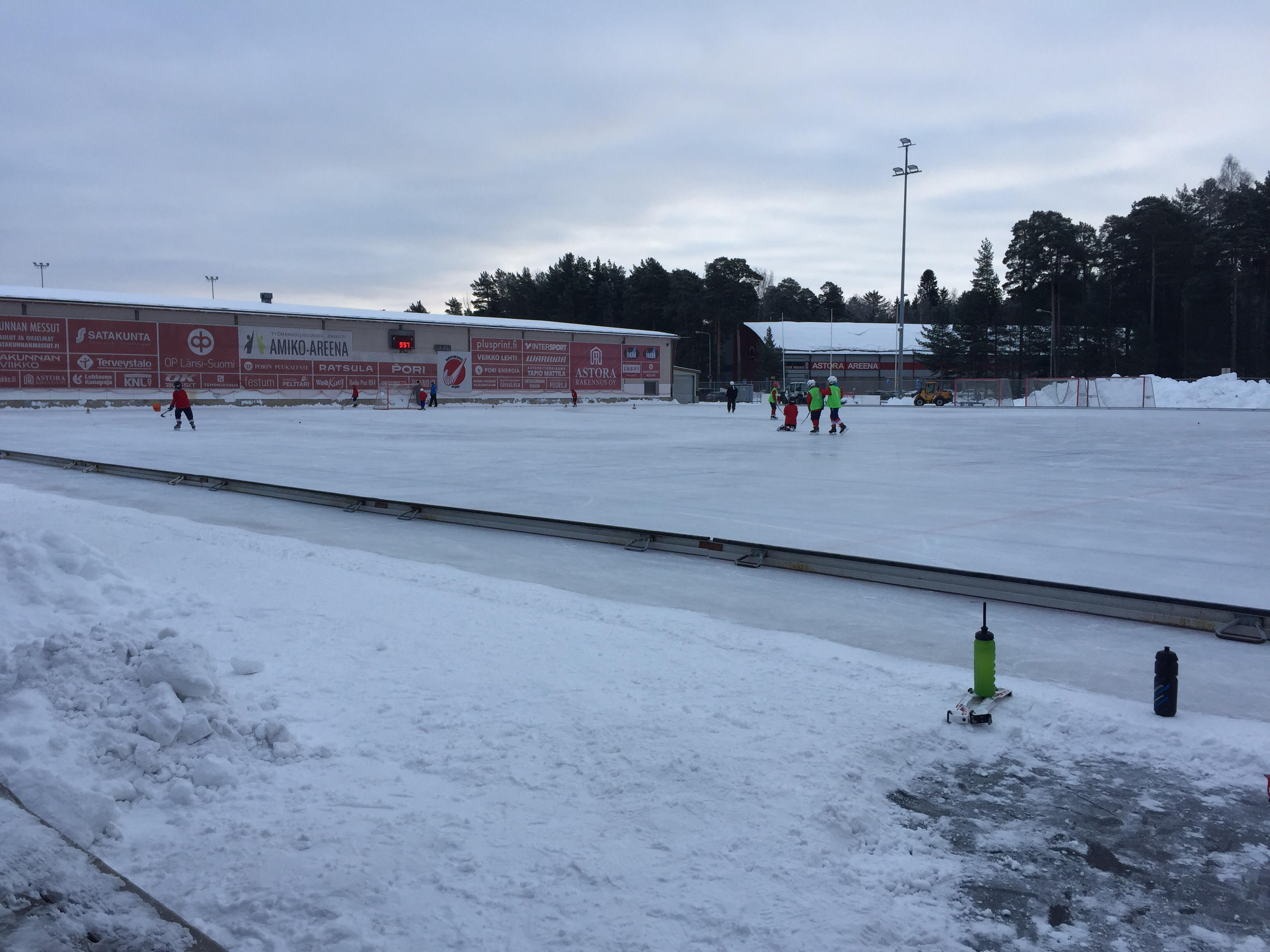
Porin tekojäärata, also known as Karhupaana, is the home ice of the Narukerä bandy team.

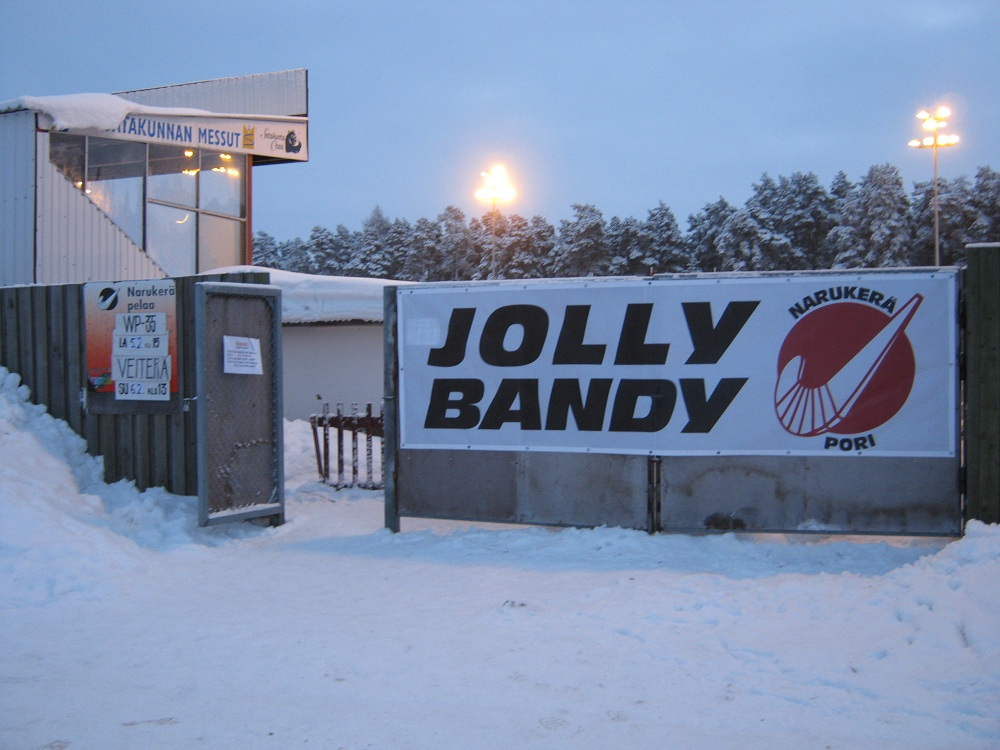
Entrance to the Porin tekojäärata

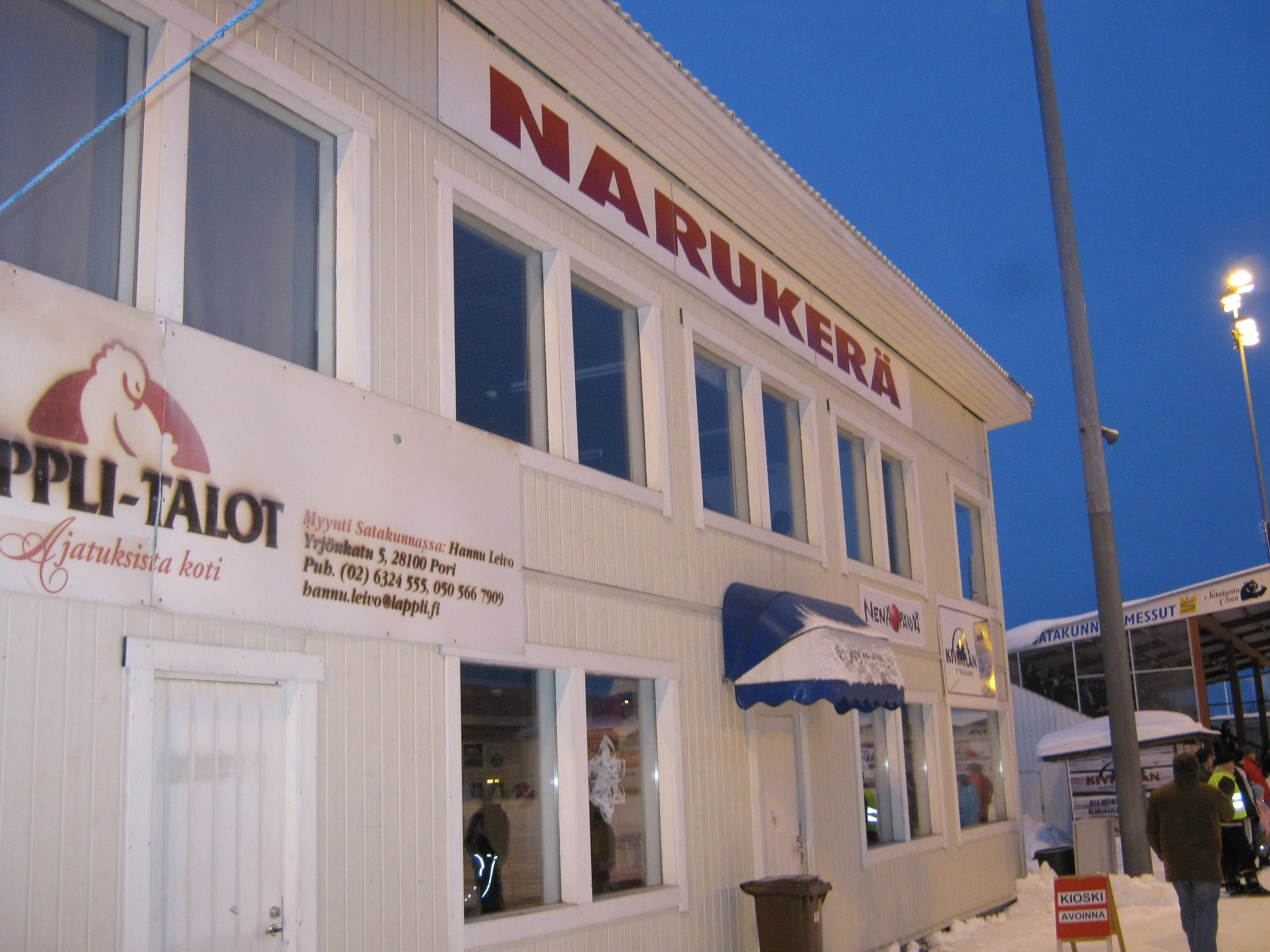
Narukerä clubhouse

Narukerä is a Finnish bandy team based in the town of Pori in the Satakunta region of Finland. The 1965 established team has won two Finnish bandy championships, in 1999 and 2023, but has got 13 medals in total, most recently bronze in 2022. Narukerä plays in the top-tier league of Finland, Bandyliiga. Narukerä plays its home games on the Karhupaana (officially Porin tekojäärata) in the Isomäki district of Pori.

== History ==
Narukerä was established in 1965. It got its first ever medal in the top-tier in 1998 when it won bronze. Narukerä got their first gold medal the following year when it won the championship in 1999.

Narukerä won their second championship in 2023.

== Home ice and clubhouse ==
Narukerä's home ice is the Porin tekojäärata, which is located in the Pori sports center in the Isomäki district. The artificial ice rink was constructed in 1985. Before the artificial ice was constructed, bandy was played on natural ice on the frozen field at the Pori sports center and before that on the Herralahti ice. The artificial ice rink's grandstand has a roof and is heated, the grandstand was completed in 1995. The Narukerä clubhouse was built next to the ice in 2005. The upper floor has club facilities and an office and announcement room, and the lower floor has a kiosk and a cafe.

== Honors ==
=== SM-liiga/Bandyliiga ===
(gold) Winner (2): 1998–99, 2022–23

(silver) Runner-up (3): 2004–05, 2011–12, 2012–13

(bronze) Bronze (8): 1997–98, 2001–02, 2005–06, 2006–07, 2009–10, 2010–11, 2020–21, 2021–22

=== Finnish Cup ===
(gold) Winner (1): 2022–23

== Players ==
=== Notable alumni ===
- Pertti Ratsula
- Pertti Juhola
- Kalevi Ruuttu
- Erkki Väkiparta
- Vladimir Plavunov
- Aleksander Pershin
- Juri Pershin
- Kimmo Kivelä
- Oleg Tchekoubach
- Jarno Väkiparta
- Markku Huhtanen
- Ville Aaltonen
- Timo Oksanen
- Lauri Arponen
- Patrick Suves

=== Retired numbers ===
Narukerä retired numbers
No.	Player	Position	Tenure	Date of retirement	Other
10	Kimmo Kivelä	C			Kivelä died in a car crash in 1992. Every year in Pori, there's a memorial game for Kivelä.
14	Erkki Väkiparta		1981–91		Väkiparta played with Narukerä for 10 years (1981–91) and served in the Narukerä office 1999–2010

== See also ==
- Isomäki (Pori)
- Bandyliiga
- List of Finnish bandy champions
