= Emil Rundqvist =

Swedish ice hockey player

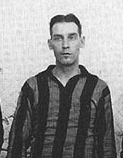
- Rundqvist with Hammarby IF in 1932.
- Born: 14 November 1905; Stockholm, Sweden
- Died: 12 May 1988 (aged 82); Stockholm, Sweden
Ice hockey career
- Position: Centre
- Played for: AIK; Karlbergs BK; Hammarby IF
- National team: Sweden
- Playing career: 1927–1935
Bandy career
- Playing position: Forward
Senior career*
Years	Team	Apps^{†}	(Gls)^{†}
1932–1934	Hammarby IF		
- * Senior club appearances and goals counted for the domestic league only. † Appearances (Goals).

Emil Rundqvist (14 November 1905 – 12 May 1988) was a Swedish ice hockey player. He won two domestic titles with Hammarby IF and competed in the 1931 World Championships. Rundqvist also played bandy.

== Athletic career ==
=== Ice hockey ===
In 1927, Rundqvist made his debut in the senior roster of AIK, competing in Elitserien. A year later, he moved to fellow top-tier club Karlbergs BK where he played for two seasons.

Rundqvist joined Hammarby IF in 1930. He won two Swedish championships with the club in 1932 and 1933, their first domestic titles. In total, Rundqvist played 79 games and scored 15 goals for Hammarby IF, until his retirement in 1935.

He made two international appearances for the Swedish national team in the 1931 World Championships, hosted by Poland, where his country finished in sixth place.

=== Bandy ===
Like many other ice hockey players at the time, Rundqvist also played bandy with Hammarby IF. He competed in Division 2, the Swedish second tier, for three seasons between 1932 and 1934.
