= Nävelsjö SK =

Bandy club

Nävelsjö SK is a bandy club in Vetlanda, Sweden. The club was founded in 1970. By joining the A teams of the two clubs Nävelsjö SK and Skirö AIK, Skirö-Nävelsjö Bandy was created. The two original clubs still exist for youth and children's bandy teams.

Skirö-Nävelsjö Bandy was promoted to Allsvenskan, the second level bandy league in Sweden, in 2014, and will therefore do its first season in Allsvenskan in 2014/15.
