= Oskar Robertsson =

Swedish bandy player

Oskar Robertsson (born October 2, 1982) is a Swedish bandy player who currently plays for Västerås SK as a half back. Oskar was a youth product of Ljusdals BK. Oskar has played for four clubs, they are:-

Ljusdals BK (2000-2003
Bollnäs GIF (2003-2004)
Falu BS (2004-2005)
Västerås SK (2005-)
