= Idrottspark =

Idrottspark or Idrottsparken may refer to:

- Ljusdals Idrottspark
- Motala Idrottspark
- Idrottsparken (Norrköping)
- Idrottsparken (Sundsvall)
- Sävstaås Idrottspark
