= Sergey Obukhov =

Russian bandy player

Sergey Gennadyevich Obukhov
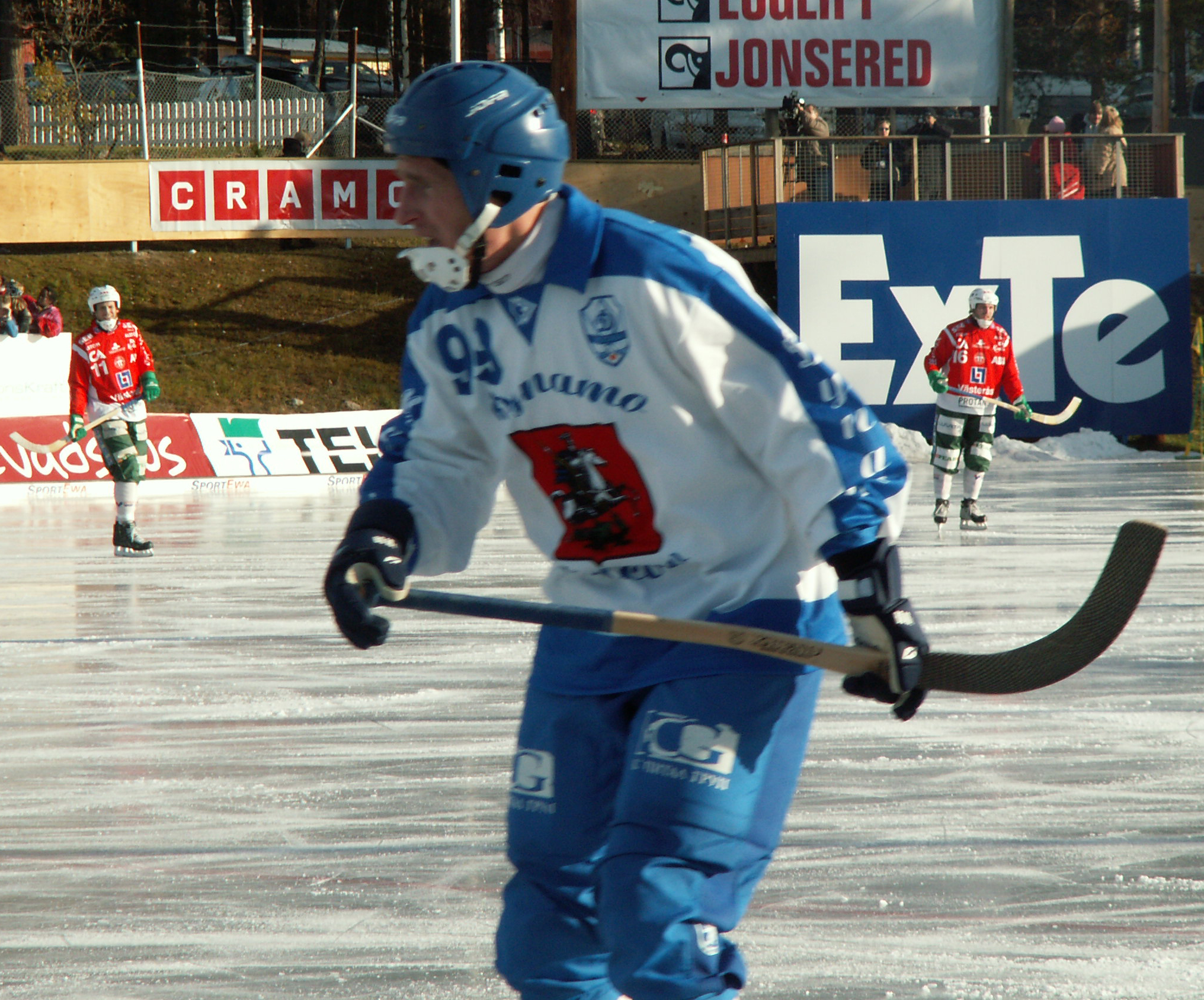
- Obukhov playing for Dynamo Moscow.

Personal information
- Full name: Sergey Obukhov
- Date of birth: 29 June 1974 (age 50)

Senior career*
Years	Team	Apps^{†}	(Gls)^{†}
1990–1995	Rodina		
1995–2002	Falu BS		
2002–2003	Vodnik		
2003–2004	Falu BS		
2004–2005	Vodnik		
2005–2010	Dynamo Moscow		
2010–2012	Dynamo-Kazan		
2012–2017	Rodina		
2017–	Dynamo-Kazan		
- * Senior club appearances and goals counted for the domestic league only. † Appearances (Goals).

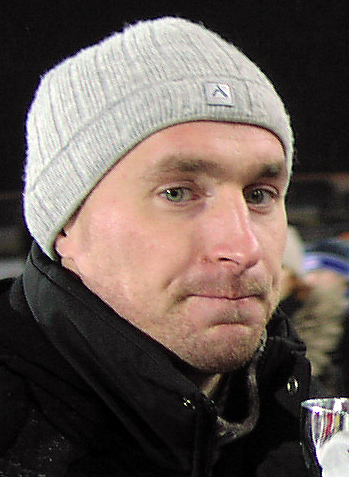
Sergey Obukhov, 2003

Sergey Gennadyevich Obukhov (Russian: Серге́й Генна́дьевич Обухов; born June 29, 1974) is a Russian professional bandy player from Kirov, who in the 2018-19 season captained Dynamo-Kazan. He has scored more goals than any other Russian player. Obukhov has played many games for the Russian national bandy team and was top scorer at the 2005 and 2007 Bandy World Championship (in 2005, Vyacheslav Bronnikov of Kazakhstan made an equal number of points, but Obukhov scored more goals than Bronnikov). Obukhov has been an important member of both club and country. In 2007 he won the Bandy World Cup, Champions Cup, Russian League Cup with Dynamo Moscow and the Bandy World Championship with Russia.

== Career ==
Obukhov made his senior debut for Rodina in the 1990–91 season. In 1995–96, he joined Falu BS and represented them until 2002 and was awarded the Swedish Player of the Year in 2001. He later played for Vodnik, Dynamo Moscow, and Dynamo-Kazan. After playing for some years in Rodina again, in 2017 he rejoined Dynamo-Kazan.
