= Jarno Väkiparta =

Finnish bandy player

Personal information
- Born: 13 March 1974 (age 51) Pori, Finland
Medal record
Men's bandy
Representing Finland
World Championships
Gold medal – first place	2004 Sweden	Team

Jarno Väkiparta (born 13 March 1974) is a Finnish bandy player who currently plays for Tillberga IK Bandy from Sweden. Väkiparta is a forward who has represented the Finnish national team. Väkiparta was born in Pori and started his career in his homeland at Narukerä before moving to Ljusdals BK in Sweden in 1998. He has also played for IFK Motala, Västerås SK and Katrineholms SK before moving to Tillberga. His best achievement is the World Championship gold in Bandy World Championship 2004.
