= Lidköpings AIK =

- City: Lidköping, Sweden
- League: Allsvenskan
- Founded: 8 September 1968; 56 years ago
- Home arena: Sparbanken Lidköping Arena

Lidköpings AIK, full name Lidköpings Allmänna Idrottsklubb, abbreviated LAIK, is a sports club in Lidköping, Sweden, mainly concentrated on playing bandy. The team colours are red and white. The club was founded in 1968 by the merger of two bandy clubs in Lidköping, Sjödalens IK and Wästerlunds IK, to create a good local competitor to Villa BK.

The club has played in the second level bandy league in Sweden, Allsvenskan, since the start of the present Allsvenskan in 2007.
