= Erkki Väkiparta =

- Position: Forward
- Shot: Left
- Played for: Bandy; Narukerä; Ice hockey JyP HT; Porin Ässät
- Playing career: 1969–1981

Erkki Väkiparta is a Finnish retired ice hockey player and bandy player. He played as a forward in the SM-sarja and SM-liiga and won two Finnish Championships.
