= Falu BK =

Sports club in Falun, Sweden

- Full name: Falu bollklubb
- Sport: bandy, soccer
- Folded: 1935
- Based in: Falun, Sweden

Falu BK was a sports club in Falun, Sweden. The men's bandy team played in the Swedish top division in 1934. The men's soccer team played in the Swedish third division during the seasons of 1934–1935 and 1935–1936.

In 1935 the club was one of four clubs who merged to become Falu BS.
