= Krasnoturyinsk =

Town in Sverdlovsk Oblast, Russia

Krasnoturyinsk Краснотурьинск
- Town
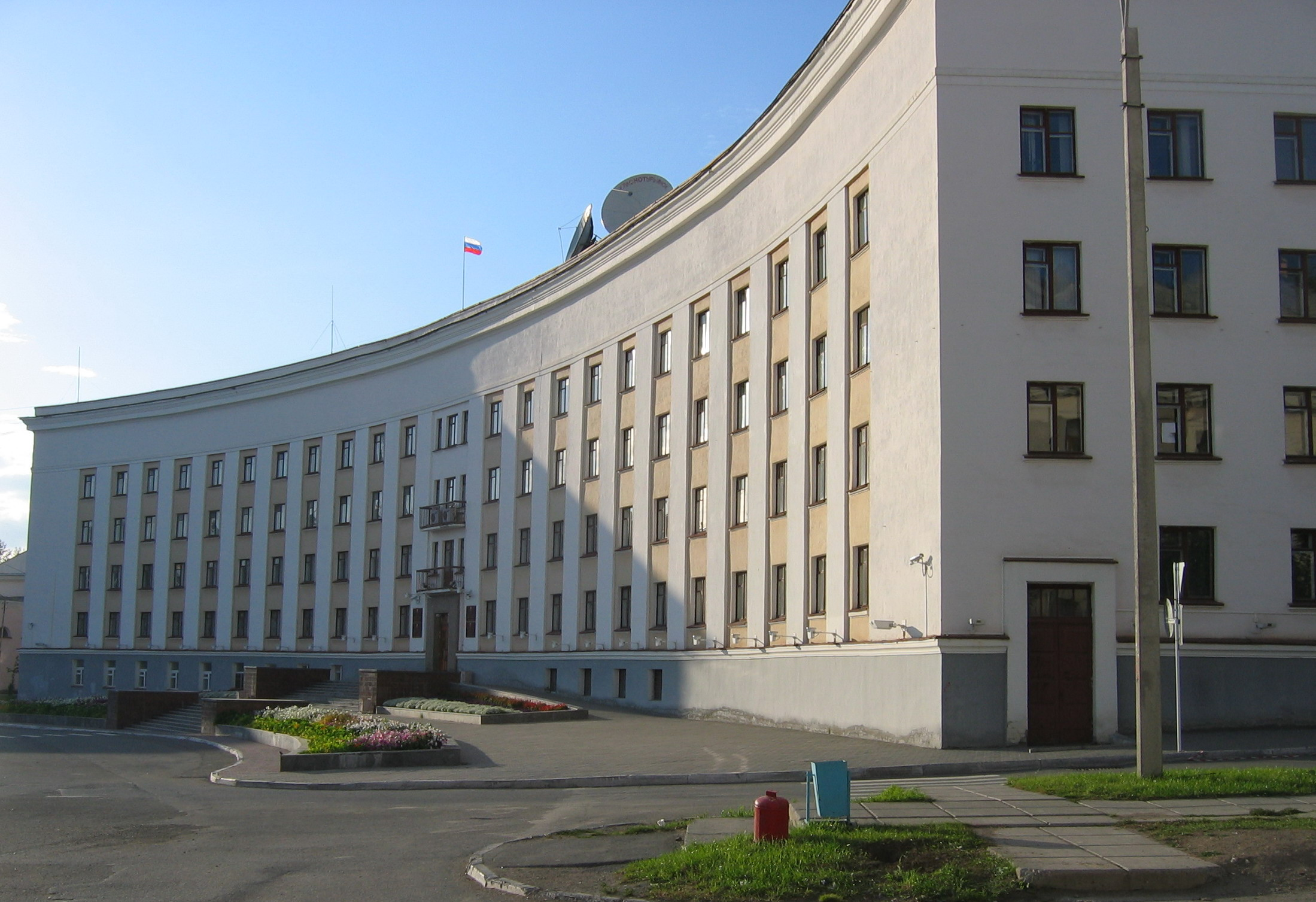
- Krasnoturyinsk Town Administration building

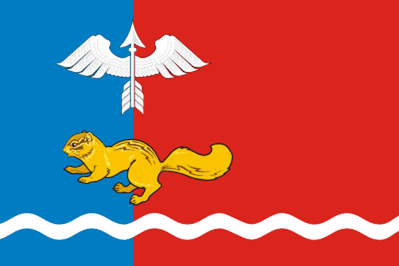
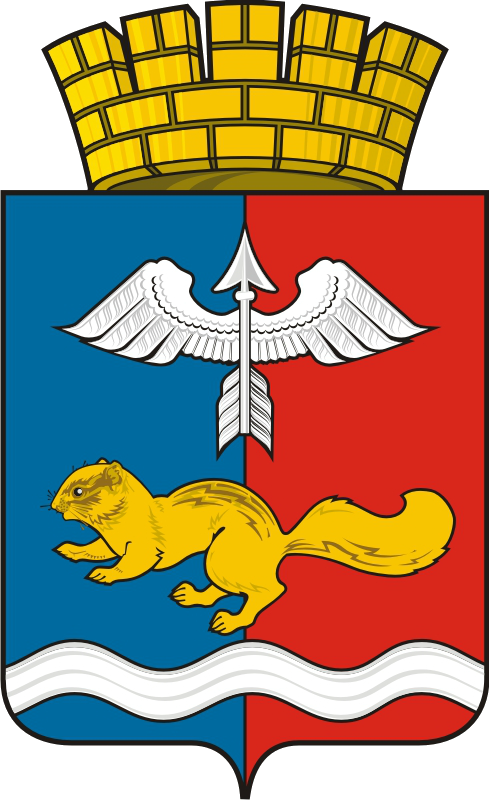
- Flag Coat of arms
- Interactive map of Krasnoturyinsk
- Location of Krasnoturyinsk Krasnoturyinsk (Sverdlovsk Oblast)
- Coordinates: 59°46′24″N 60°11′07″E
- Country: Russia
- Federal subject: Sverdlovsk Oblast
- Founded: 1758
- Town status since: 1944

Government
  - Head: Alexander Ustinov
- Elevation: 200 m (660 ft)

Population
  - Estimate (2018): 57,008 )

Administrative status
  - Subordinated to: Town of Krasnoturyinsk
  - Capital of: Town of Krasnoturyinsk

Municipal status
  - Urban okrug: Krasnoturyinsk Urban Okrug
  - Capital of: Krasnoturyinsk Urban Okrug
- Time zone: UTC+5 (MSK+2)
- Postal code: 624440—624450
- Dialing code: +7 34384
- OKTMO ID: 65745000001

Krasnoturyinsk (Russian: Краснотурьи́нск) is a town in Sverdlovsk Oblast, Russia, located on the Turya River (Ob's basin), 348 kilometers (216 mi) north of Yekaterinburg. It is a major industrial, educational and cultural center of the Northern Urals. The administrative center of the Krasnoturyinsk Municipal District and the Northern Sverdlovsk Administrative District, which includes 14 other municipalities. It was transformed into a city in 1944 from the former urban-type settlement of Turyinsky rudniki.

== History ==
It was one of the copper mining settlements established in 1758 on the Turya River. At the time, it was known as Turyinskiye Rudniki (Турьинские Рудники). Later it was known as Turyinsky (Турьинский). It was granted town status and renamed Krasnoturyinsky in 1944.. It is also known for its representation as the landing place of Rocky Balboa in Rocky IV when he travels to Russia.

== Administrative and municipal status ==
Within the framework of the administrative divisions, it is, together with five rural localities, incorporated as the Town of Krasnoturyinsk—an administrative unit with the status equal to that of the districts. As a municipal division, the Town of Krasnoturyinsk is incorporated as Krasnoturyinsk Urban Okrug.

== Sports ==
The bandy club Dynamo Mayak has played in the highest division of the Russian Bandy League and now plays in the second highest division, Russian Bandy Supreme League. Their home arena has a capacity of 5000. The city is now interested in making it equipped with artificial ice. In 2017 Yevgeny Ivanushkin, originally from Krasnoturinsk, became the second player, after Sergey Lomanov Jr., to score 1 000 goals in Russian Bandy Super League.
