= 2007–08 in Swedish bandy =

The 2007–08 season in Swedish bandy, starting August 2007 and ending July 2008:

== Honours ==
=== Official titles ===
Title	Team	Reason
Swedish Champions 2007–08	Edsbyns IF	Winners of Elitserien play-off
Swedish Cup Champions 2007	Hammarby IF	Winners of Svenska Cupen

== Domestic results ==
=== 2008 Elitserien play-offs ===
Final

15 March 2008

Edsbyns IF	11–6	Sandvikens AIK
Liw (3); Hedqvist (3); Hammarström (2); Edling (2); Peter Törnberg	Report	Nilsson (3); Mohlén; Andersson; Hagberg

Studenternas IP, Uppsala
Attendance: 19,513
Referee: Peter Öhrlund
