= Nils Bergström (bandy) =

Swedish sportsperson (1921–2001)

Nils "Nicke" Evert Oscar Bergström (28 March 1921 – 27 December 2001) was a Swedish bandy and football player. In football, Bergström played 5 Allsvenskan games with AIK. In bandy, Bergström played with Nässjö IF and became the top-tier Division 1 topscorer in the 1952, 1955, and 1958 seasons.
