= Söderköpings IS =

Sports club in Söderköping, Sweden

- Full name: Söderköpings idrottssällskap
- Sport: soccer, bandy
- Founded: 12 December 1917
- Folded: 15 January 2004
- Based in: Söderköping, Sweden
- Ballpark: Vikingavallen

Söderköpings IS was a sports club in Söderköping, Sweden, established 12 December 1917. The bandy team played in the Swedish top division in 1942 losing all five league games. In 1950 the club won the bandy district championship. The soccer team has played in the Swedish fourth division.

On 15 January 2004 the club merged with IK Ramunder, leading to the establishment of Söderköpings IK.
