= David Carlsson (bandy) =

Swedish bandy player

David Carlsson (born 28 June 1983) is a Swedish bandy player who currently plays for Vetlanda BK as midfielder. David is a youth product of Nävelsjö SK.

Carlsson has only played for two clubs-

Nävelsjö SK (2003-2006)
Vetlanda BK (2006-)
