= Borgia Norrköping BK =

- City: Norrköping, Sweden
- League: Division 1
- Division: Mellersta
- Founded: 1941; 85 years ago

Borgia Norrköping BK is a bandy club in Norrköping, Sweden, established in 1941. The men's bandy team played in the Swedish top division during the season of 1988-1989.
