= 2015 Svenska cupen (bandy) =

Swedish bandy tournament

2015 Svenska Cupen in bandy had its playoff in the weekend of 26–27 September 2015 in Lidköping. This was the eleventh annual Svenska Cupen.

Västerås SK won the final 6–2 (1–2) against Edsbyns IF. Sandvikens AIK won the bronze medals after 7–2 against Hammarby IF.
