= Filipstads IF =

Sports club in FIlipstad, Sweden

- Full name: Filipstads idrottsförening
- Sport: bandy, track and field athletics, ice hockey soccer (earlier)
- Founded: 1930
- Based in: Filipstad, Sweden
- Stadium: Kalhyttans IP

Filipstads IF is a sports club in Filipstad, Sweden, established in 1930. The men's bandy team played in the Swedish top division during the seasons of 1967–1968, 1972–1973 and 1974–1975. The soccer team played in the Swedish fourth division during the season of 1956/1957.
