= Otterbäckens BK =

- City: Gullspång, Sweden
- League: Division 1
- Division: Mellersta
- Founded: 1935; 91 years ago

Otterbäckens Bandyklubb, Otterbäckens BK, is a bandy club in Gullspång, Sweden. The team colours are blue and white. The club was founded in 1935.

The club was playing in Allsvenskan, the second level bandy league in Sweden, until 2011 when it was relegated to Division 1. After two years in Division 1, the club got promoted to Allsvenskan again for the 2013-14 season and stayed there for the 2014/15 season. The club is more successful in the youth department, e.g. winning the Swedish Championship for youth teams in 2006.
