= David Karlsson =

David Karlsson may refer to:

- David Karlsson (bandy) (born 1981), Swedish bandy player
- David Karlsson (wrestler) (1881–1946), Swedish wrestler
- David Lillieström Karlsson (born 1993), Swedish ice hockey player
- David Moberg Karlsson (born 1994), Swedish footballer

== See also ==
- David Carlsson (disambiguation)
