= Allsvenskan (bandy) =

Swedish men's bandy league

- Sport: Bandy
- Founded: 2007
- No. of teams: 30 (in three groups) 2007/08 and 2008/09; 24 (in two groups) since 2009
- Country: Sweden
- Promotion to: Elitserien
- Relegation to: Division 1
- Website: bandyallsvenskan.se

Allsvenskan (literally, "The All Swedish") (Swedish: Allsvenskan i bandy) is since the 2007–08 the second highest level of bandy in Sweden and comprises 24 teams in two regional groups. This change was made when Allsvenskan and Elitserien were cancelled and a new top-tier called Elitserien was created.

== Structure ==
During the first two years, Allsvenskan consisted of three groups with ten teams in each, i.e. a total of 30 teams. The groups were divided geographically, in Allsvenskan Norra (North), Allsvenskan Mellersta (Mid) and Allsvenskan Södra (South).

For the third season, 2009–10, Allsvenskan was restructured into two groups, Norra and Södra, with 12 teams each, so there were only 24 teams left in total. This structure has so far (2014) been kept since then.

== Teams ==
=== 2017–18 teams ===
Locations of the 2017–18 Allsvenskan teams

The following 16 teams took part in the 2017–18 season:

- Åby/Tjureda IF
- Falu BS
- Frillesås BK
- Gripen Trollhättan BK
- Gustavsbergs IF
- IF Boltic
- IFK Kungälv
- Lidköpings AIK
- Ljusdals BK
- Nässjö IF
- NitroNora BS
- Örebro SK
- Peace & Love City Bandy
- Tranås BoIS
- UNIK Bandy
- Västanfors IF

=== Former teams ===
Due to many promotions to Elitserien and relegations to Division 1, there have been many clubs playing in Allsvenskan through the years. They are all in the following list with information about the seasons they played in Allsvenskan.

means the club was promoted to Elitserien for the following season
means the club was relegated to Division 1 for the following season
means the club had qualified for Allsvenskan but choose to withdraw.

| Team | Home town | 2007–08 | 2008–09 | 2009–10 | 2010–11 | 2011–12 | 2012–13 | 2013–14 | 2014–15 | 2015–16 | 2016–17 | 2017–18 |
|---|---|---|---|---|---|---|---|---|---|---|---|---|
| Åby/Tjureda IF | | | | | | | | | | | | AS |
| Åtvidabergs BK | | | | | 2010–11 | | 2012–13 | 2013–14 | | | | |
| Blåsuts BK | | | 2008–09 | | 2010–11 | 2011–12 | 2012–13 | 2013–14 | 2014–15 | | | |
| IF Boltic (BS BolticGöta) (Note: BS BolticGöta was created by a merger of the two clubs IF Boltic and IF Göta. After the 2007–08 season the name IF Boltic is used again for the new club.) | | 2007–08 | 2008–09 | 2009–10 | | 2011–12 | 2012–13 | 2013–14 | 2014–15 | | | AS |
| Borlänge-Stora Tuna BK | | | | | 2010–11 | | 2012–13 | 2013–14 | 2014–15 | | | AS |
| Derby/Linköping BK | | 2007–08 | | | | | | | | | | |
| Djurgårdens IF | Stockholm | 2007–08 | | | | | | | | | | |
| Finspångs AIK | | 2007–08 | 2008–09 | 2009–10 | 2010–11 | 2011–12 | 2012–13 | | 2014–15 | | | |
| Falu BS | | | 2008–09 | | 2010–11 | 2011–12 | 2012–13 | | 2014–15 | | | AS |
| Frillesås BK | | 2007–08 | 2008–09 | 2009–10 | | 2011–12 | 2012–13 | 2013–14 | | | | AS |
| GAIS | Gothenburg | 2007–08 | 2008–09 | 2009–10 | 2010–11 | | | | | | | |
| Gripen Trollhättan BK | | | | 2009–10 | 2010–11 | 2011–12 | 2012–13 | 2013–14 | 2014–15 | | | AS |
| Gustavsbergs IF | | 2007–08 | 2008–09 | 2009–10 | 2010–11 | | 2012–13 | 2013–14 | 2014–15 | | | AS |
| HaparandaTornio BF | | 2007–08 | 2008–09 | | | 2011–12 | 2012–13 | 2013–14 | 2014–15 | | | |
| Härnösands AIK | | | | | | | | 2013–14 | | | | |
| Helenelunds IK | | 2007–08 | 2008–09 | | | | | | | | | |
| Jönköping Bandy IF | | 2007–08 | 2008–09 | 2009–10 | 2010–11 | 2011–12 | 2012–13 | 2013–14 | 2014–15 | | | |
| Kalix BF | Kalix | 2007–08 | 2008–09 | 2009–10 | 2010–11 | | 2012–13 | | | | | |
| Karlsborgs BK | | 2007–08 | 2008–09 | | | | | | | | | |
| Katrineholm Värmbol BS | Katrineholm | 2007–08 | 2008–09 | | 2010–11 | 2011–12 | 2012–13 | 2013–14 | 2014–15 | | | |
| Köpings IS | Köping | 2007–08 | 2008–09 | 2009–10 | 2010–11 | 2011–12 | 2012–13 | | 2014–15 | | | |
| IFK Kungälv | | 2007–08 | | | | | | | | | | AS |
| Lidköpings AIK | | 2007–08 | 2008–09 | 2009–10 | 2010–11 | 2011–12 | 2012–13 | 2013–14 | 2014–15 | | | AS |
| Ljusdals BK | | 2007–08 | 2008–09 | 2009–10 | 2010–11 | 2011–12 | | | | | | AS |
| Målilla GoIF | | 2007–08 | | | | | | | | | | |
| Mölndal Bandy | | | | | | 2011–12 | 2012–13 | | | | | |
| Mosseruds GF | | | | | 2010–11 | | 2012–13 | | | | | |
| IFK Motala | | | | 2009–10 | 2010–11 | 2011–12 | | 2013–14 | 2014–15 | | | |
| Nässjö IF | | 2007–08 | 2008–09 | 2009–10 | 2010–11 | 2011–12 | 2012–13 | 2013–14 | 2014–15 | | | AS |
| NitroNora BS | | | | | | | | | | | | AS |
| Nyborgs SK | | | 2008–09 | | | | 2012–13 | | | | | |
| Örebro SK | | 2007–08 | | 2009–10 | 2010–11 | 2011–12 | 2012–13 | 2013–14 | 2014–15 | | | AS |
| Otterbäckens BK | | 2007–08 | 2008–09 | 2009–10 | 2010–11 | | | 2013–14 | 2014–15 | | | |
| IFK Rättvik | | | | 2009–10 | 2010–11 | 2011–12 | 2012–13 | 2013–14 | 2014–15 | | | |
| Selånger SK | | 2007–08 | 2008–09 | | | | | 2013–14 | | | | |
| Skirö-Nävelsjö BS | | | | | | | | | 2014–15 | | | |
| Skutskärs IF | | 2007–08 | 2008–09 | 2009–10 | 2010–11 | 2011–12 | | | 2014–15 | | | |
| Slottsbrons IF | | 2007–08 | 2008–09 | | | | | | | | | |
| Söderfors GoIF | | 2007–08 | 2008–09 | 2009–10 | | | | | | | | |
| IF Stjärnan | | | 2008–09 | 2009–10 | | 2011–12 | | | | | | |
| Surte BK (Note: Previously called Ale/Surte BK.) | | 2007–08 | 2008–09 | 2009–10 | 2010–11 | | | 2013–14 | 2014–15 | | | |
| IK Tellus | | | | | | 2011–12 | 2012–13 | 2013–14 | 2014–15 | | | |
| Tillberga IK | | | 2008–09 | 2009–10 | | | 2012–13 | 2013–14 | (Note: Tillberga IK did not qualify for Elitserien by playing, but replaced GAIS in Elitserien, since GAIS choose to withdraw.) | | | |
| Tjust IF | | 2007–08 | 2008–09 | | | | | 2013–14 | | | | |
| Tranås BoIS | | | 2008–09 | 2009–10 | 2010–11 | 2011–12 | 2012–13 | 2013–14 | 2014–15 | | | AS |
| Unik BK | | 2007–08 | 2008–09 | | | 2011–12 | | 2013–14 | 2014–15 | | | AS |
| Uppsala BoIS | | 2007–08 | | | | | | | | | | |
| Västanfors IF | | 2007–08 | 2008–09 | 2009–10 | 2010–11 | 2011–12 | | | | | | AS |

== See also ==
- Allsvenskan and Elitserien
