= Åtvidabergs BK =

- City: Åtvidaberg, Sweden
- League: Division 1
- Division: Södra
- Founded: 1939; 86 years ago

Åtvidabergs Bandyklubb, Åtvidabergs BK, ÅBK, is a bandy club in Åtvidaberg, Sweden. The team colours are blue, red and white. The club was founded in 1939. The men's bandy team played the 1952 season in the Swedish top division.

The club was playing in Allsvenskan, the second level bandy league in Sweden, during the seasons 2010/11, 2012/13 and 2013/14, but has else been playing in the lower level Division 1.
