= Unik BK =

Bandy club in Uppsala, Sweden

- City: Uppsala, Sweden
- League: Allsvenskan
- Founded: 1947; 78 years ago

Unik Bandyklubb is a bandy club in Uppsala, Sweden. Unik was founded as Uppsala-Näs Idrottsklubb in 1947, but has since change names to just use the abbreviation. The bandy club and the football club Unik are now legally separate, but allied and share logo, colours, history and fan base.

The club has been playing in Allsvenskan, the second level bandy league in Sweden, off and on the last decade. After a year in third-level Division 1, the club managed to get promoted to Allsvenskan again for the 2013/14, and will stay there for the 2014/15 season.
