= Budapest Rangers =

Bandy club in Budapest, Hungary

Budapest Rangers, founded in 2004, are a bandy sports club based in Budapest, Hungary.

The club is probably the best team in Hungary, with many of the players representing the Hungarian national bandy team. There has been a cup competition played between six teams with smaller sized teams than the traditional eleven due to a shortage of players in Hungary. The club's first team finished in second place with the second team finishing in third position.
