= Isomäki (Pori) =

District of Pori, Finland

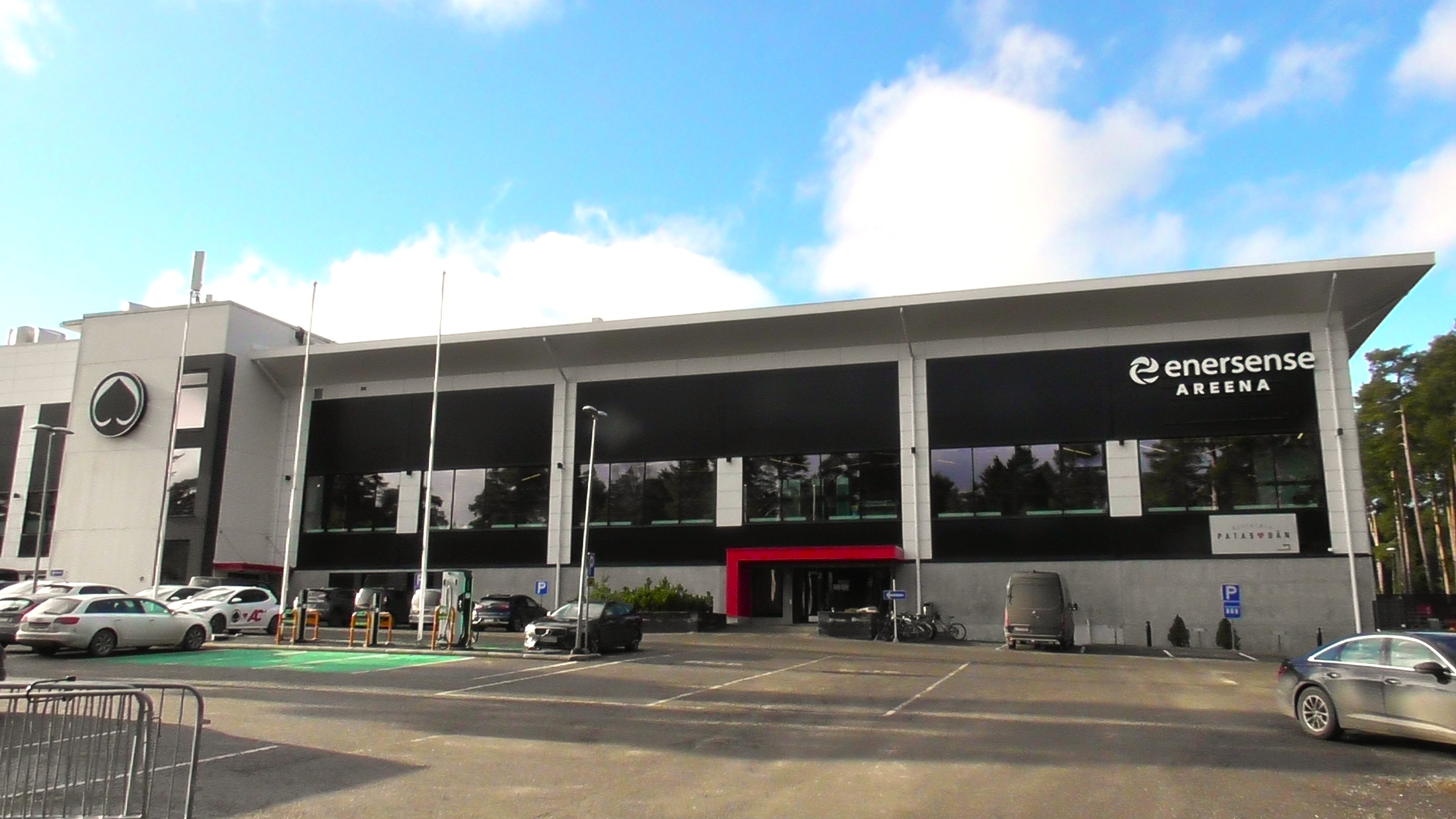
Enersense Areena ice hall at Isomäki district in Pori, Finland

Isomäki (in Swedish: Storbacken) is one of the districts of Pori. The area is meant for sports activities and there are no residential buildings. The area borders Highway 2 to the north and Highway 8 to the west. To the south is the Pori forest, which is thought of as a part of the Isomäki sports centre.

Isomäki is home to an ice hockey arena, the Pori Stadium, an outdoors ice rink. Next to the ice rink is Karhuhalli, used by footballers and other athletes.

== Isomäki Ice Hall ==
Isomäki Ice Hall (also known as Enersense Areena and Porin jäähalli) is an arena mainly used for ice hockey. It is mainly used by HC Ässät Pori.
