= Skirö-Nävelsjö BS =

Bandy club in Vetlanda, Sweden

- Full name: Skirö-Nävelsjö bandysällskap
- Sport: bandy
- Founded: 2009; 17 years ago
- Based in: Vetlanda, Sweden
- Ballpark: Sapa Arena

Skirö-Nävelsjö Bandysällskap or colloquially Skirö-Nävelsjö Bandy, is a bandy club in Vetlanda, Sweden. The club colours are blue and yellow. The club was founded in 2009 by joining the A teams of the two clubs Nävelsjö SK and Skirö AIK. The latter two clubs still exist for youth and children's bandy teams.

The club was promoted to Allsvenskan, the second level bandy league in Sweden, in 2014, and will therefore do its first season in Allsvenskan in 2014/15.
