= Dynamo Mayak =

- City: Krasnoturyinsk, Russia
- League: Russian Bandy Supreme League
- Division: Group 2
- Founded: 1948; 78 years ago
- Home arena: Mayak Stadium
- Website: hkmayak.ru

HK Dynamo Mayak (Russian: ХК «Динамо-Маяк») is a bandy club in Krasnoturyinsk, Russia. The club was founded in 1948 and has earlier been playing in the Russian Bandy Super League, the top-tier of Russian bandy. The home games are played at Stadium Mayak in Krasnoturyinsk. The city is now interested in making it equipped with artificial ice. The club colours are red, white and blue.
