= Heden =

Public square in Gothenburg, Sweden

Coordinates: 57°42′8″N 11°58′40″E

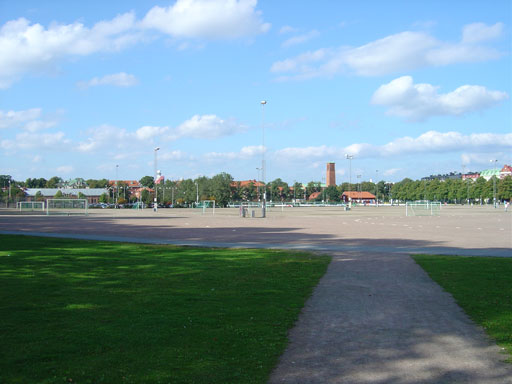
- Heden viewed from the south
- Interactive map of Heden
- Address: Götebirg; Sweden

Heden is a ballcourt and public space and square in the centre of Gothenburg, Sweden. Football matches are played there in the run-up to the final of the Gothia Cup. The final is played at Ullevi. Also the largest handball tournament in the world is played there during the summer: Partille Cup, when Heden is transformed to a handball festival with over 50 playing fields and 15,000 players.

An artificial bandy ice has recently been established and GAIS play their home matches there. At the 2013 Bandy World Championship, the group match between Sweden and Russia was played at the Heden arena.

Before its public use, Heden was a military ground where they used to drill soldiers (Excersisheden).

== Sources ==
- Gothia Cup Facts & Stats
- Partille Cup week programme
