= Svenska Cupen (bandy) =

- Founded: 2005; 21 years ago
- Region: Sweden
- Teams: 8
- Current champions: men: Edsbyns IF (4th title) women: Villa Lidköping BK (5th title)
- Most championships: men: Sandvikens AIK, Villa Lidköping BK (6 titles) women: Villa Lidköping BK (5 titles)
- Broadcaster: TV4
- Website: Svenska Cupen i bandy

Svenska Cupen (English: The Swedish Cup), Svenska Cupen i bandy, is a knockout cup competition in Swedish bandy and the main bandy cup only open for domestic Swedish teams.

The first year was 2005, and was won by Edsbyns IF. The first women's edition was played in 2019, and won by Västerås SK.

Starting for the second year of the cup, a qualification round was made with matches played at different locations around Sweden in January. The real cup was then played at one location in the beginning of or mid-October. Since bandy is a winter sport with a season from autumn to spring, this meant that the qualification games were played in another season than the final cup was played, which could mean that a qualified club could come to the cup with a team consisting of many other players compared to the qualification round, as players are usually traded during the summer. For the 2010 Svenska cupen the qualification round was moved to August–September and the final cup was made smaller, from earlier 16 teams to now 8.

The cup in October has been played in Edsbyn, Västerås, Vänersborg and Linköping in different years.

== Cup winners ==
=== Men ===
Year	Winner
2005	Edsbyns IF
2006	Sandvikens AIK
2007	Hammarby IF
2008	Edsbyns IF
2009	Sandvikens AIK
2010	Sandvikens AIK
2011	Sandvikens AIK
2012	Sandvikens AIK
2013	Hammarby IF
2014	Hammarby IF
2015	Västerås SK
2016	Villa Lidköping BK
2017	Sandvikens AIK
2018	Västerås SK
2019	Edsbyns IF
2020	Villa Lidköping BK
2021	Villa Lidköping BK
2022	Villa Lidköping BK
2023	Villa Lidköping BK
2024	Villa Lidköping BK
2025	Bollnäs GIF
2026	Edsbyns IF

=== Women ===
Year	Winner
2019	Västerås SK
2020	Villa Lidköping BK
2021	Villa Lidköping BK
2022	Villa Lidköping BK
2023	Västerås SK
2024	Västerås SK
2025	Villa Lidköping BK
2026	Villa Lidköping BK
