= Härnösands AIK =

- City: Härnösand, Sweden
- League: Division 1
- Division: Övre Norrland
- Founded: 1945; 80 years ago
- Home arena: Högslättens IP

Härnösands AIK is a sports club in Härnösand, Sweden, established in 1945 and originally thought to be called BK Virgo but had to change name because the other name was already used. Active within bandy, the club played soccer, track and field athletics, skiing and table tennis activity.

The men's bandy team played in the Swedish top division during the season of 1984–1985. The women's bandy team has played several seasons in the Swedish top division.
