= Tillberga IK Bandy =

Tillberga IK
- City: Västerås, Sweden
- League: Allsvenskan (bandy)
- Founded: 8 February 1930; 95 years ago
- Home arena: ABB Arena
- Head coach: Oskar Robertsson
- Website: www.tillbergabandy.se
Home colours	Away colours

Tillberga IK Bandy, also called Tillberga Bandy Västerås or TB Västerås, is a Swedish Bandy club playing in the Allsvenskan for the first time in the 2006–07 season. Tillberga IK were founded in 1930 and play their home games at Rocklunda. Tillberga IK have struggled in the Allsvenskan this season finishing bottom of the Norra division and will have a difficult fight to avoid relegation during the Superallsvenskan. Tillberga IK gained promotion in the 2005–06 season by finishing top in the Division One Norra Playoffs.

The club has been playing in the top-tier Elitserien on and off for many seasons. It did not qualify for the 2014–15 Elitserien but was then offered the vacant place there when GAIS choose to withdraw.

== Squad ==
As of 1 January 2007:

Note: Flags indicate national team as defined under FIB eligibility rules. Players may hold more than one non-FIB nationality.

No.	Pos.	Nation	Player
1	GK	(Sweden) SWE	Henrik Steen
2	DF	(Sweden) SWE	Patrik Berggren
3	DF	(Finland) FIN	Sami Saari
7		(Sweden) SWE	Tomas Engström
9	FW	(Finland) FIN	Jarno Väkiparta
10	MF	(Sweden) SWE	Andreas Broberg
11		(Sweden) SWE	Mattias Carlsson
13	MF	(Sweden) SWE	Calle Juhlin
15		(Sweden) SWE	Tobias Johnsson

No.	Pos.	Nation	Player
16		(Sweden) SWE	Jonas Pürkner
18	MF	(Sweden) SWE	Niklas Svensson
20	MF	(Sweden) SWE	Per Fosshaug
21		(Sweden) SWE	Jens Blixt
22	DF	(Sweden) SWE	Johnny Johansson
23	MF	(Sweden) SWE	Jonas Lindqvist
25	GK	(Sweden) SWE	Johan Persson
30	GK	(Sweden) SWE	Marcus Björklund
