= Swedish bandy league system =

Sports league system in Sweden

The Swedish bandy league system is a series of interconnected leagues for club bandy in Sweden.

== Current system ==
The table below shows how the system works as of the 2014–2015 season. For each division, its Swedish name and number of clubs is given.

This present system was introduced for the 2007–2008 season. The changes are a top division with fewer teams which has also changed its name, it is now called Elitserien ("the Elite League").

It is not guaranteed that each division is a feeder of teams to the division that lies directly above it and relegates teams to the divisions that lie directly below it, even though this usually is the case. Some years, all the teams which are facing the risk of relegation get to play a qualification round in the end of the season against the best teams from the division below. Other years, the last teams in the leagues have been automatically relegated.

Level	League(s)/Division(s)			
1	Elitserien			
1	14 clubs			
2	Allsvenskan			
2	North, 12 clubs		South, 12 clubs	
3	Division 1			
3	North, 8 clubs	West, 10 clubs	East, 10 clubs	South, 10 clubs
4	Division 2			

== Previous systems ==
=== 1981/82 – 2006/07 ===
During the seasons 1981/82 – 2006/07, Allsvenskan and Elitserien was the combined top-tier. The top-tier had the name Allsvenskan in the beginning of the season (in the autumn). Allsvenskan had two groups, one northern group and one southern group. After Christmas the best of the teams from the two groups of Allsvenskan played in Elitserien (which always premiered on Boxing Day, 26 December) while the rest of the teams played in Superallsvenskan. The teams in Superallsvenskan faced the risk of being relegated to the second level league.

The second level was called Division 1.

=== 1931/32 – 1981/82 ===
The top-tier Swedish bandy league which was instated in 1931 was called Division 1. The second level was called Division 2.
