= Ljusdals IP =

Sportsground in Ljusdal, Sweden

Coordinates: 61.8325°N 16.1006°E

- Interactive map of Ljusdals IP
- Location: Ljusdal, Sweden
- Capacity: 6,000

Tenant
- Ljusdal

Ljusdals IP is a sports venue in Ljusdal. It is the home of Ljusdals BK and was the Bandy World Cup venue until 2008, when the tournament moved indoors.
