= GAIS Bandy =

GAIS
- City: Gothenburg, Sweden
- Founded: 2005; 20 years ago
- Home arena: Heden

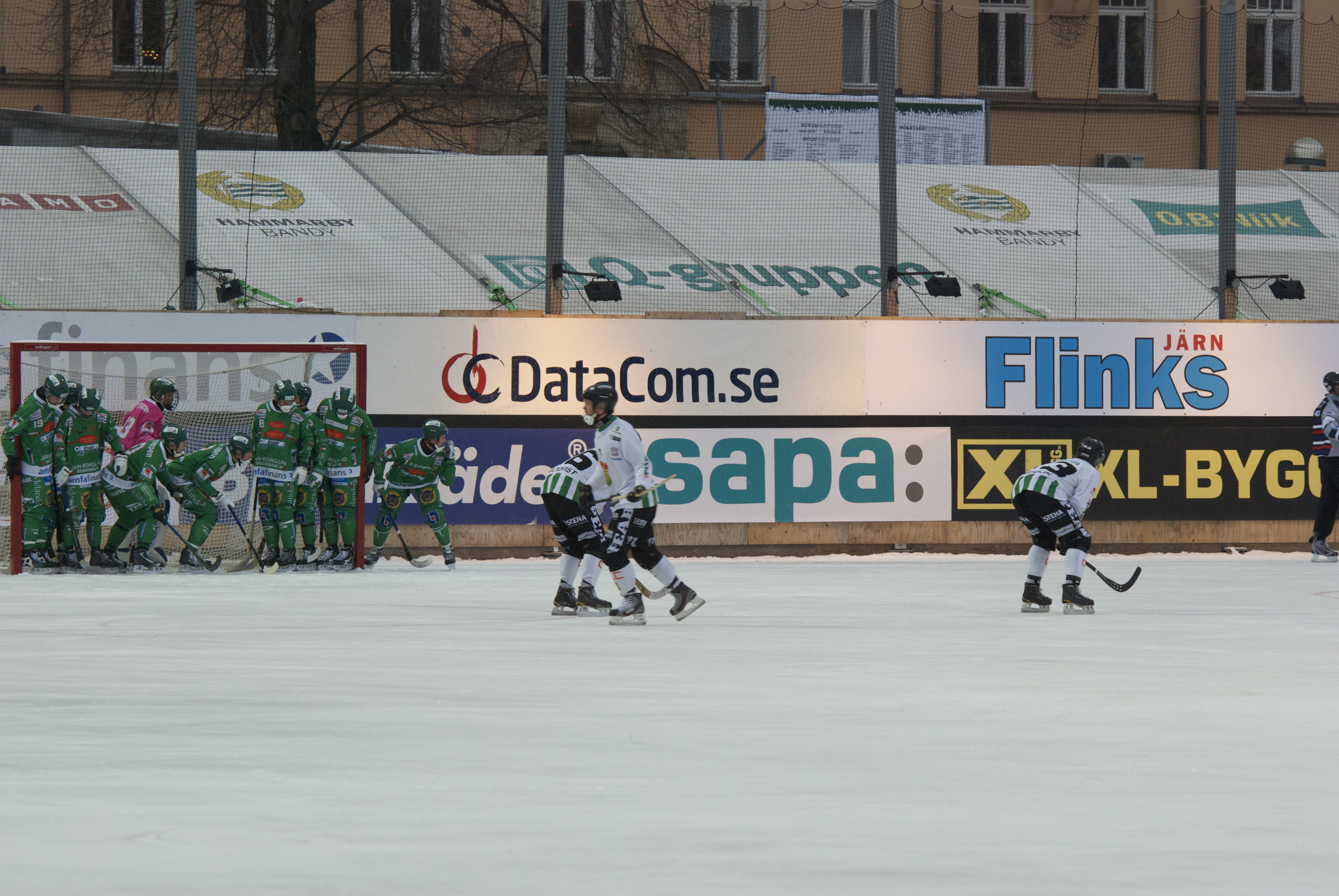
GAIS about to execute a corner

GAIS Bandy is the bandy department of sports club GAIS from Gothenburg. In 1920, GAIS won the Gothenburg district championship, but the club had not had an active bandy department for years when it took up playing bandy again in 2005.

GAIS play their home games at Heden in central Gothenburg. GAIS came close to winning their first tournament in 2006 when they lost 6–10 to IFK Kungälv in the final of the Kosa Cup. They hosted one match, Sweden–Russia, of the 2013 Bandy World Championship.

GAIS played in Elitserien, the top-tier of Swedish bandy, for three seasons 2011–12, 2012–13, and 2013–14. The team was qualified for continued play in Elitserien for the 2014–15 season, but choose to withdraw due to problems with getting a good enough home-ice in Gothenburg. The club had hoped to get help from Gothenburg Municipality, but the city said no.

== See also ==
- Category:GAIS Bandy players
