= Edsbyn Arena =

Sports venue in Edsbyn, Sweden

Coordinates: 61.3849°N 15.8275°E

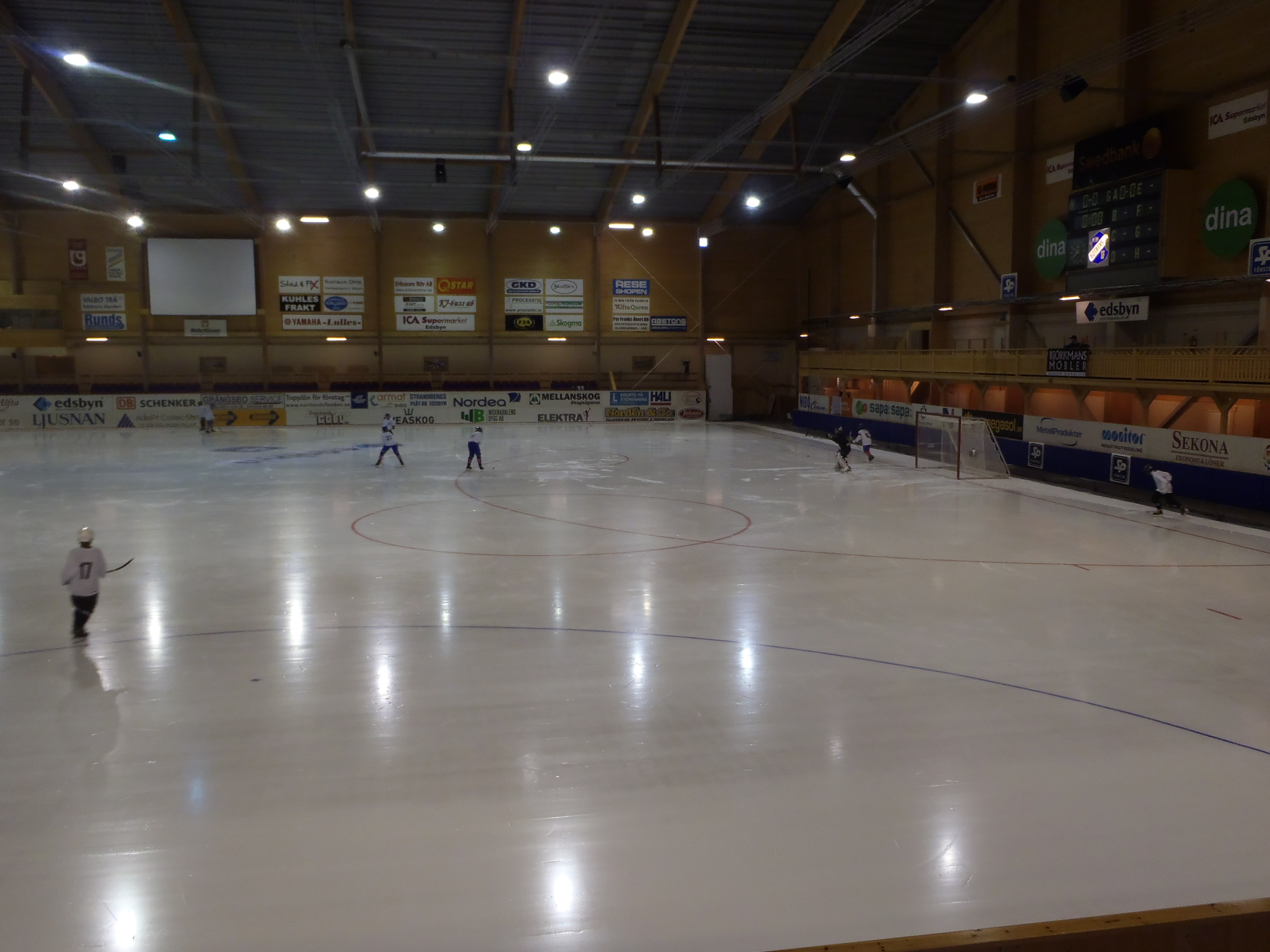
- Edsbyn Arena in August 2013
- Interactive map of Edsbyn Arena
- Location: Edsbyn, Sweden

Construction
- Opened: 22 September 2003

Tenant
- Edsbyns IF

Edsbyn Arena is a sports venue in Edsbyn, Sweden. It is the home of Edsbyns IF. Inaugurated on 22 September 2003 by King Carl XVI Gustaf of Sweden, it was the first indoor bandy rink in Sweden.

Major work was completed following the 2002–2003 season. On 31 March 2003, construction of the ceiling began. The unit was shut down the same day, and removal of the former ice began. In April the same year, the wooden beams were delivered.

The first game inside was played on 5 October 2003 when Edsbyns IF defeated Ljusdals IF, 7–1, in a friendly game. Walls weren't added until after the 2003–2004 season.
