= Ljusdals BK =

Bandy team in Ljusdal, Sweden

- City: Ljusdal, Sweden
- League: Allsvenskan
- Founded: 19 January 1943; 83 years ago
- Home arena: Ljusdals IP

Ljusdals BK, also known as LBK, is a Swedish bandy club currently playing in Allsvenskan, the second highest division in Swedish bandy. Founded in 1943, they are playing at Gamla Idrottsparken (IP) in Ljusdal, Hälsingland. Ljusdal have a supporters group called "Ljusdal Lightnings".

== History ==
Ljusdals BK was founded on 19 January 1943 In 1975, the club won the national championship.

Ljusdals BK was relegated from Elitserien to Allsvenskan in 2006–07 after a loss against Tillberga on 14 February 2007. Ljusdals BK managed to advance back to Elitserien in 2012 after five seasons in Allsvenskan. Ljusdals BK stayed in Elitserien 2012-2014.

Ljusdals BK made a revisit to Elitserien in 2024 but dropped back down to Allsvenskan after losing the series.

== Honours ==
=== Domestic ===
- Swedish Champions:
  - Winners (1): 1975
  - Runners-up (2): 1970, 1972

=== International ===
- World Cup:
  - Runners-up (5): 1978, 1984, 1993, 1997, 1999

== See also ==
- Category:Ljusdals BK players
