= Ljusdal =

Place in Hälsingland, Sweden

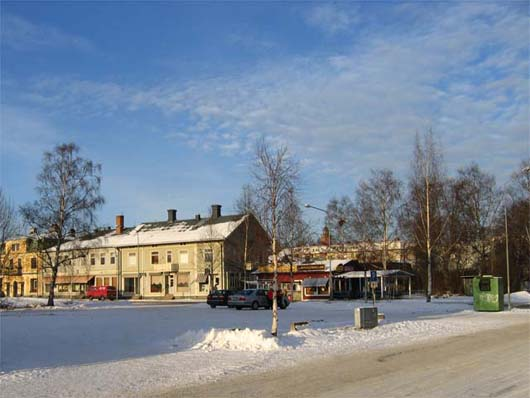
- Ljusdal

- Location within Sweden Gävleborg Location within Sweden
- Coordinates: 61°50′N 16°05′E
- Country: Sweden
- Province: Hälsingland
- County: Gävleborg County
- Municipality: Ljusdal Municipality

Area
  - Total: 5.29 km^{2} (2.04 sq mi)

Population (31 December 2010)
  - Total: 6,230
  - Density: 1,178/km^{2} (3,050/sq mi)
- Time zone: UTC+1 (CET)
  - Summer (DST): UTC+2 (CEST)
- Website: www.ljusdal.se

Ljusdal (Swedish: [ˈjʉ̌ːsdal]) is a locality and the seat of Ljusdal Municipality, Gävleborg County, Sweden with 6,230 inhabitants in 2010.

Ljusdal is situated on Riksväg 83 which runs between Tönnebro in Söderhamn Municipality in Gävleborg County and Ånge in Västernorrland County. It is located beside the river Ljusnan which goes from Bruksvallarna to the Gulf of Bothnia. Ljusdal is noted for having hosted the annual Bandy World Cup in the sport of bandy from 1974 to 2008.

Three Decorated Farmhouses of Hälsingland situated in Ljusdal Municipality were inscribed in 2012 on the UNESCO list of World Heritage Sites.

== Sports ==
The following sports clubs are located in Ljusdal:

- Ljusdals IF
- Ljusdals bandyklubb
- Ljusdals ridklubb
- Ljusdals judoklubb
- Ljusdals karateklubb

== Gallery ==
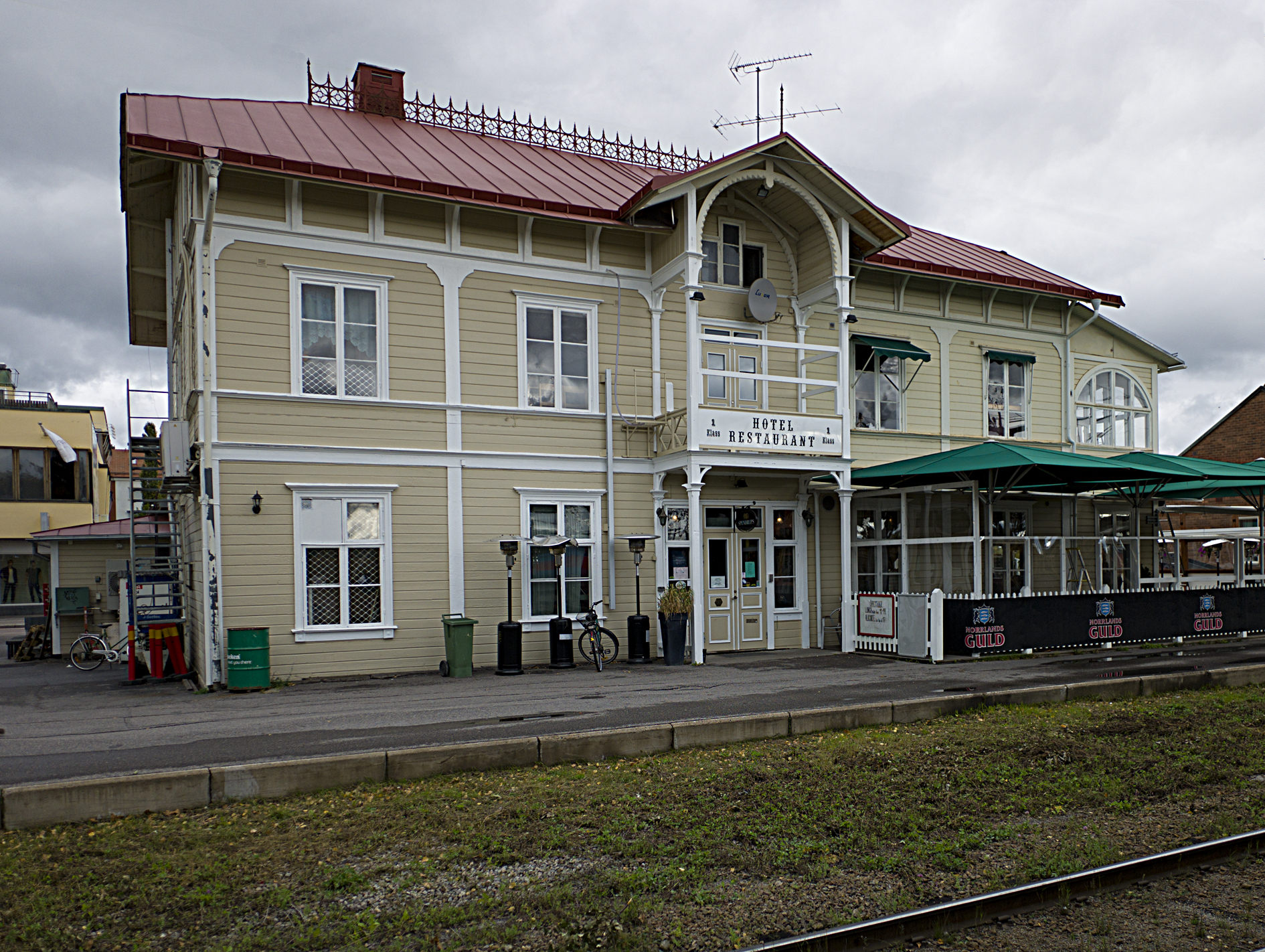
Ljusdal Railway Hotel

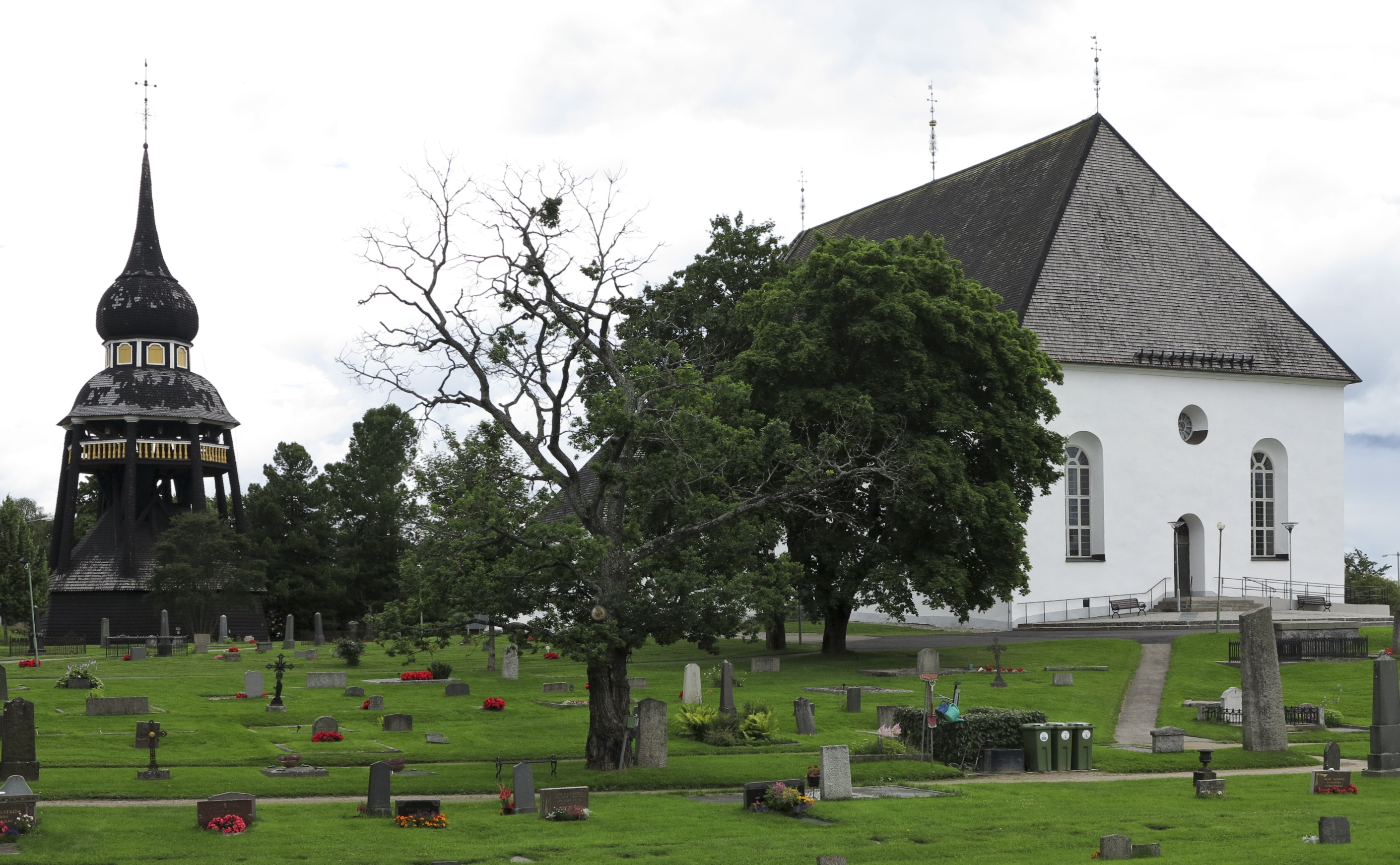
Ljusdal Church

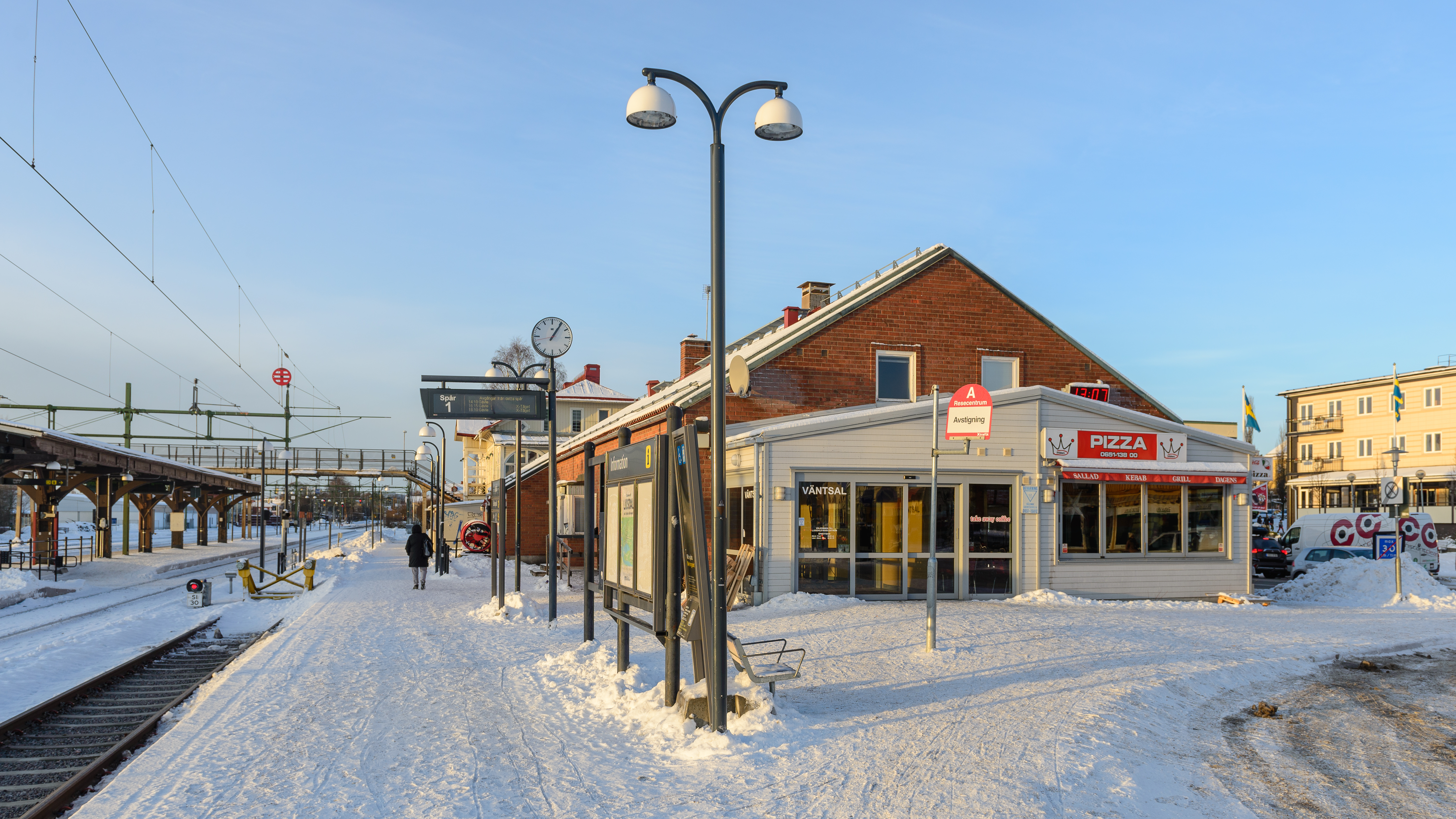
Ljusdal Railway Station

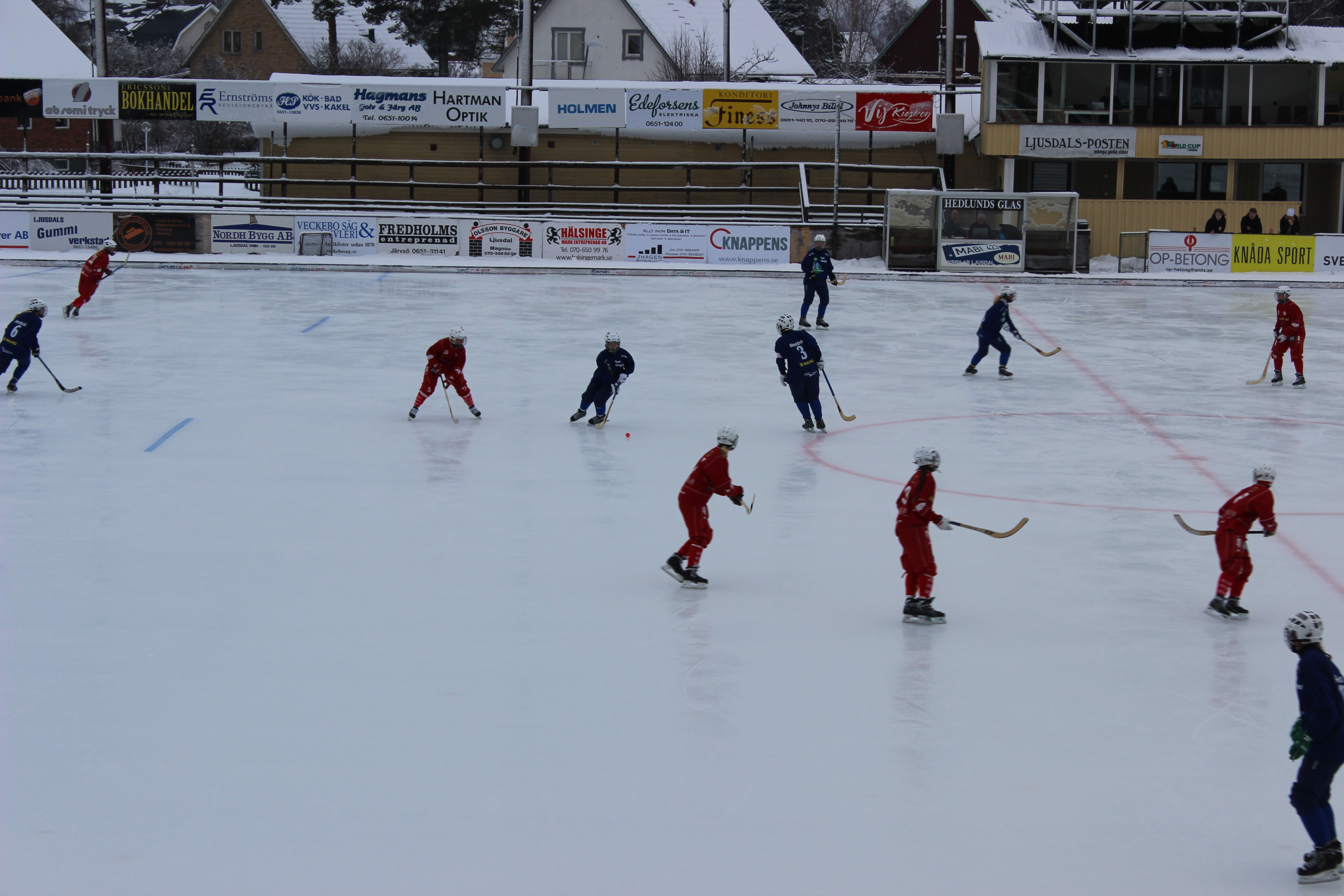
Bandy at Ljusdals IP

== See also ==
- Ljusdal Municipality
