= Vetlanda =

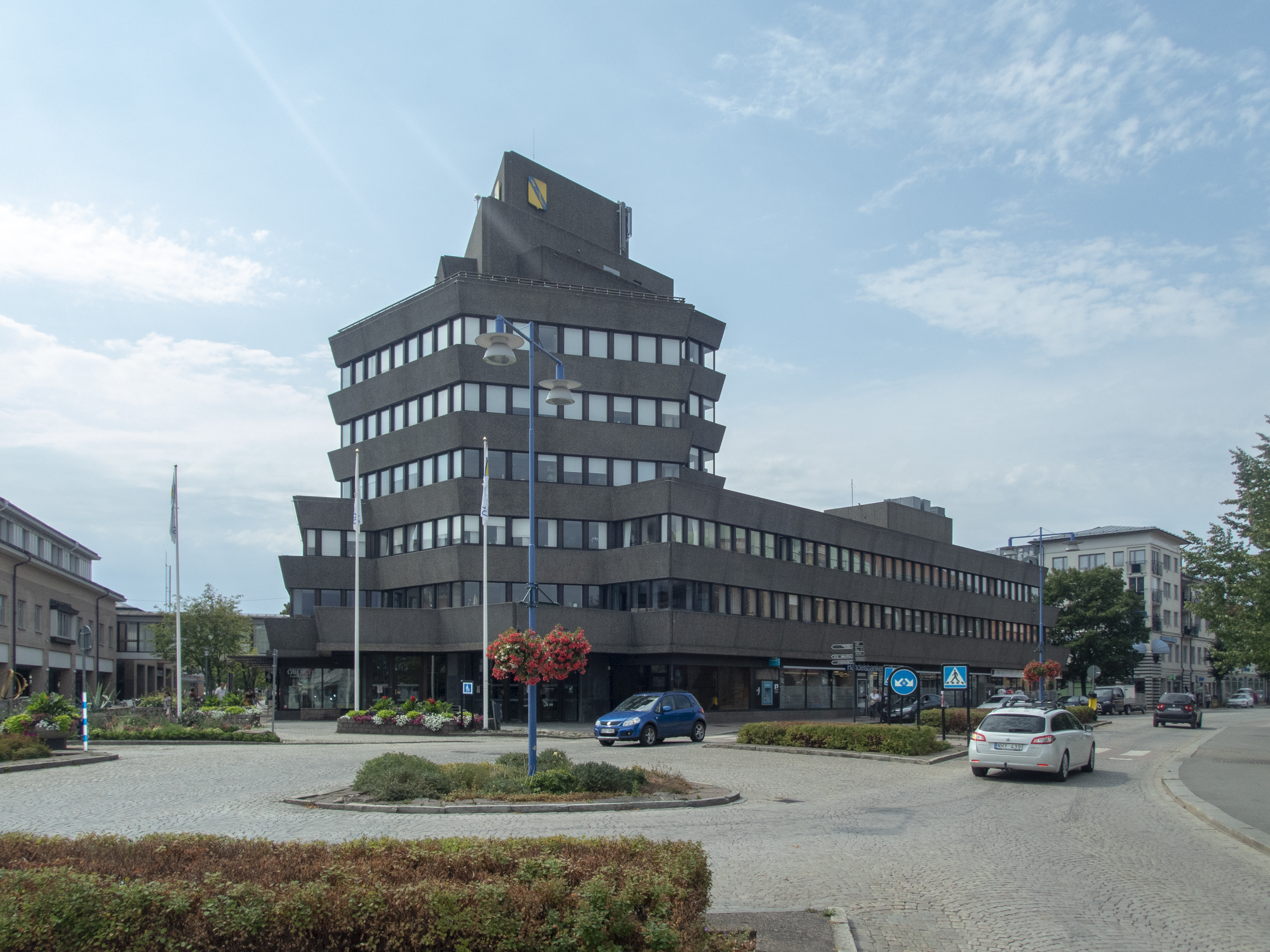
- Vetlanda Town Hall

- Location within Jönköping Location within Sweden
- Coordinates: 57°26′N 15°04′E
- Country: Sweden
- Province: Småland
- County: Jönköping County
- Municipality: Vetlanda Municipality

Area
  - Total: 10.17 km^{2} (3.93 sq mi)

Population (31 December 2010)
  - Total: 13,050
  - Density: 1,283/km^{2} (3,320/sq mi)
- Time zone: UTC+1 (CET)
  - Summer (DST): UTC+2 (CEST)
- Climate: Cfb

Vetlanda is a locality and the seat of Vetlanda Municipality, Jönköping County, Sweden with 13,050 inhabitants in 2010.

== History ==
Vetlanda was still nothing more than a village for several centuries. With the 1840s population boom in Småland, and the industrial revolution winning ground in Sweden, the industry expanded and people settled in the village. With the railways crossing Vetlanda in the late 19th century the population further blossomed, and Vetlanda got the title of a city on New Year's Day 1920, at which time its population amounted to 3,015.

The coat of arms was selected as an ear of wheat, a derivation of the arms for the old jurisdiction Östra Härad (sv), wherein Vitala was rumoured to have been the centre, that depicted three ears of wheat. The present spelling Vetlanda did not come into use until the 1920s, before that it was known as Hvetlanda, a form that can be found in several companies and organizations.

In the 19th century, wood industry got a stronghold in Vetlanda, a position it still has today. Manufacturing is large in Vetlanda: besides wood industries there are also strong metal industries and other factories.

In 2021, the city was a scene to a mass stabbing attack.

== Sport ==
=== Bandy ===
Vetlanda has a sports teams that competes in the highest league in its sport, Vetlanda bandyklubb. VBK has won the Swedish bandy championship three times, 1986, 1991 and 1992 and European Cup once, 1991. Skirö-Nävelsjö Bandy, playing in the second-tier Allsvenskan, is also situated in Vetlanda. In 2013, the B-pool of the Bandy World Championship was played in Vetlanda.

=== Motorcycle speedway ===
Vetlanda Speedway are a motorcycle speedway team that compete in the Swedish Speedway Team Championship and are eleven times champions of Sweden. They are based at the Vetlanda Motorstadion.

=== Rowing ===
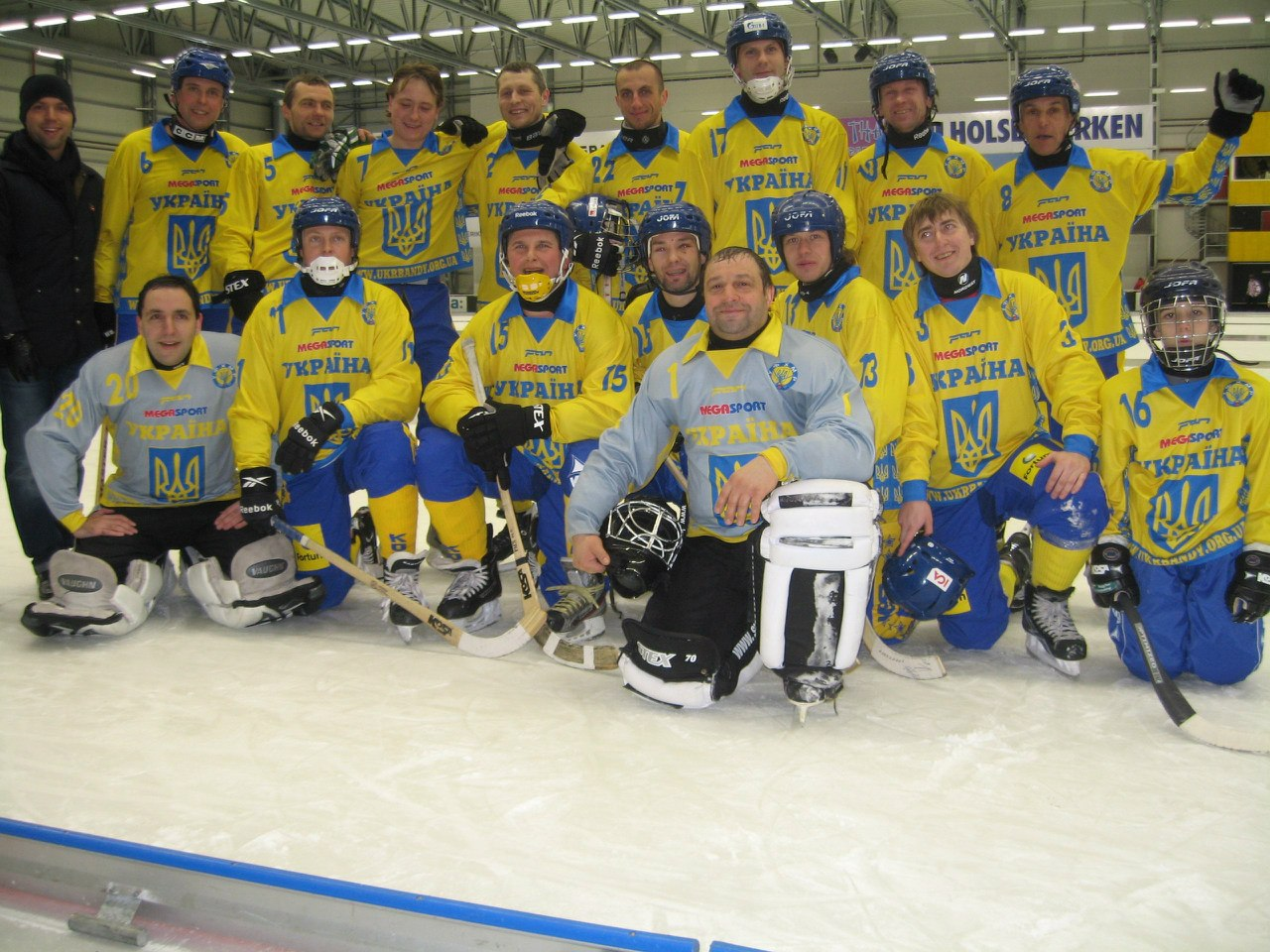
Ukraine national bandy team in Vetlanda at their first World Championship

The city used to have one of the oldest rowing clubs in the country, Vetlanda Roddarsällskap, which disbanded in 1982.

== Notable natives ==
- Elitserien ice hockey player Alexander Ytterell (born July 1, 1991)
- NHL ice hockey player Johan Franzén (born December 23, 1979)
- NHL ice hockey player Mattias Tedenby (born February 21, 1990)
- NHL ice hockey player Erik Karlsson (born May 31, 1990)
- Sculptor Peter David Edstrom (born March 27, 1873)
- Singer and media personality Lena Philipsson (born January 19, 1966)
- Music producer and songwriter Putte Nelsson (born December 5, 1971)
- Thomas H Jonasson Speedway Rider (born November 27, 1988)
