= Edsbyn =

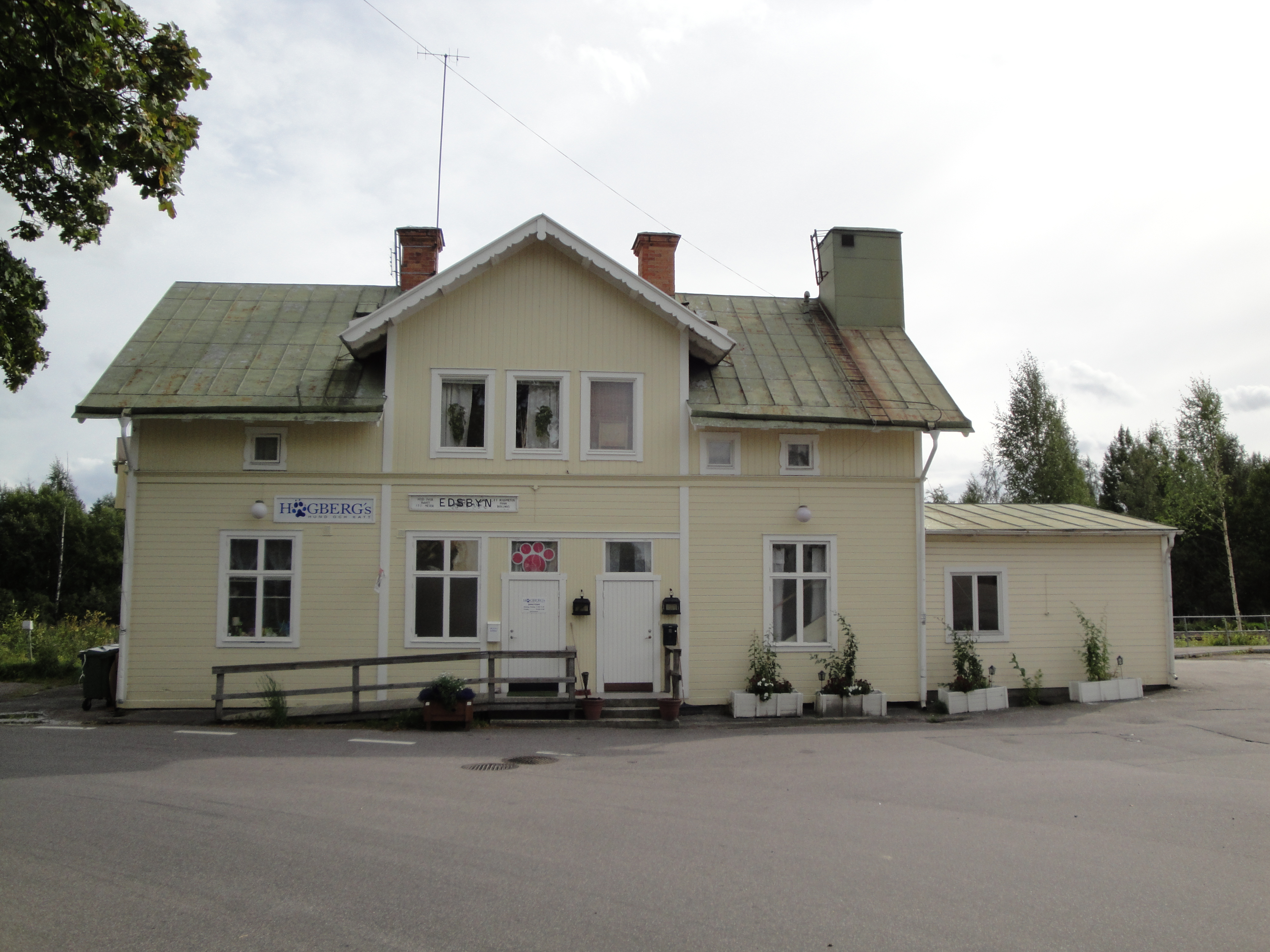
- Edsbyn Train Station

- Location within Sweden Gävleborg Location within Sweden
- Coordinates: 61°23′N 15°49′E
- Country: Sweden
- Province: Hälsingland
- County: Gävleborg County
- Municipality: Ovanåker Municipality

Area
  - Total: 5.26 km^{2} (2.03 sq mi)

Population (2020)
  - Total: 4,321
  - Density: 821/km^{2} (2,130/sq mi)
- Time zone: UTC+1 (CET)
  - Summer (DST): UTC+2 (CEST)

Edsbyn (Swedish pronunciation: [ˈěːdsbʏn]) is a locality and the seat of Ovanåker Municipality, Gävleborg County, Sweden with 4321 inhabitants in 2020. It is located in the historical province of Hälsingland.

Edsbyn is most famous for its former ski and nowadays office furniture manufacturing industry Edsbyverken; the sports club Edsbyns IF; and being the hometown of the creator of Minecraft, Markus Persson throughout his early childhood.

== Transport ==
=== Rail ===
Edsbyn, along with Alfta and other settlements in the area, used to have rail service along the Bollnäs–Orsa Railway. It was completed in January 1900 as a means of transporting forestry products from the area, with passenger service following, operated by SJ. During the 1960s, an improved road network took over large amounts of both passenger and cargo traffic that used to be carried by rail. This led to a reduction in, and later the suspension of passenger service on 1 September 1971. Limited freight service continued until 2004. Maintenance on the line ceased on 13 December 2015.

Inlandsbanan have expressed interest in reopening the line for freight, more specifically lumber and limestone. A cost estimate conducted in 2011 put the cost at least at 60 million SEK. Politicians in the municipalities of Ovanåker, Bollnäs Rättvik, Orsa and Mora have also expressed interest in the line reopening.

The closest railway station in use is located in Bollnäs.

=== Road ===
Today, almost all traffic to Edsbyn occurs via road. Länsväg 301 provides the main connection to nearby towns such as Alfta, Bollnäs and Rättvik.

=== Public transport ===
Edsbyn is served by three bus lines, 100, 39 and 172, which are all operated by Xtrafik, the public transport provider in Gävleborg County.

Bus lines in Edsbyn
Line	Route
100	Edsbyn-Alfta-Runemo-Bollnäs-Söderhamn
172	Edsbyn-Alfta-Bollnäs-Söderhamn-Hudiksvall
39	Edsbyn-Svabensverk-Enviken-Falun

=== Airport ===
Next to Edsbyn Arena, there is a small airfield with a 700-meter grass runway. The closest airport with regular service is Mora–Siljan Airport, located about 80 kilometres (50 mi) southwest of Edsbyn.

== Climate ==
Edsbyn has a subarctic climate (Köppen Dfc) with long winters with occasional strong cold periods and short but mild summers. Being situated in a river valley at a moderately high elevation surrounded by high hills, the settlement is in a frost hollow. This results in large swings between different times of the day and larger seasonal variations than seen elsewhere in Hälsingland.

Climate data for Edsbyn (2002–2021 averages); extremes since 1951)
Month	Jan	Feb	Mar	Apr	May	Jun	Jul	Aug	Sep	Oct	Nov	Dec	Year
Record high °C (°F)	9.7 (49.5)	12.2 (54.0)	16.8 (62.2)	25.9 (78.6)	29.3 (84.7)	32.7 (90.9)	32.2 (90.0)	33.4 (92.1)	27.0 (80.6)	21.5 (70.7)	15.1 (59.2)	10.7 (51.3)	33.4 (92.1)
Mean maximum °C (°F)	5.3 (41.5)	6.2 (43.2)	11.7 (53.1)	17.5 (63.5)	23.8 (74.8)	26.7 (80.1)	28.1 (82.6)	26.6 (79.9)	21.3 (70.3)	14.4 (57.9)	9.9 (49.8)	6.2 (43.2)	29.3 (84.7)
Mean daily maximum °C (°F)	−2.6 (27.3)	−0.8 (30.6)	3.7 (38.7)	9.7 (49.5)	15.1 (59.2)	19.5 (67.1)	22.0 (71.6)	20.1 (68.2)	15.2 (59.4)	8.2 (46.8)	2.6 (36.7)	−1.0 (30.2)	9.3 (48.8)
Daily mean °C (°F)	−6.8 (19.8)	−5.4 (22.3)	−2.2 (28.0)	3.8 (38.8)	8.9 (48.0)	13.3 (55.9)	15.8 (60.4)	14.3 (57.7)	9.9 (49.8)	4.2 (39.6)	−0.6 (30.9)	−4.9 (23.2)	4.2 (39.5)
Mean daily minimum °C (°F)	−11.0 (12.2)	−9.9 (14.2)	−7.1 (19.2)	−2.2 (28.0)	2.7 (36.9)	7.1 (44.8)	9.6 (49.3)	8.5 (47.3)	4.6 (40.3)	0.1 (32.2)	−3.7 (25.3)	−8.7 (16.3)	−0.8 (30.5)
Mean minimum °C (°F)	−25.3 (−13.5)	−23.8 (−10.8)	−19.8 (−3.6)	−8.9 (16.0)	−3.9 (25.0)	0.3 (32.5)	3.1 (37.6)	0.9 (33.6)	−2.9 (26.8)	−7.9 (17.8)	−14.2 (6.4)	−22.3 (−8.1)	−28.2 (−18.8)
Record low °C (°F)	−34.4 (−29.9)	−35.7 (−32.3)	−33.0 (−27.4)	−20.7 (−5.3)	−6.9 (19.6)	−2.5 (27.5)	0.0 (32.0)	−2.8 (27.0)	−7.5 (18.5)	−14.5 (5.9)	−25.0 (−13.0)	−33.7 (−28.7)	−35.7 (−32.3)
Average precipitation mm (inches)	37.5 (1.48)	25.6 (1.01)	25.1 (0.99)	24.2 (0.95)	50.2 (1.98)	75.9 (2.99)	74.3 (2.93)	75.2 (2.96)	41.3 (1.63)	58.2 (2.29)	42.3 (1.67)	38.1 (1.50)	567.9 (22.38)
Source 1: SMHI Open Data
Source 2: SMHI Open Data

== Sports ==
The following sports clubs are located in Edsbyn:

- Edsbyns IF – bandy
- Edsbyns IF FF – football

Edsbyns IF is renowned for its successes in men's bandy. The first indoor bandy arena in Sweden, Edsbyn Arena, was built in Edsbyn and dedicated in 2003 by King Carl XVI Gustaf.

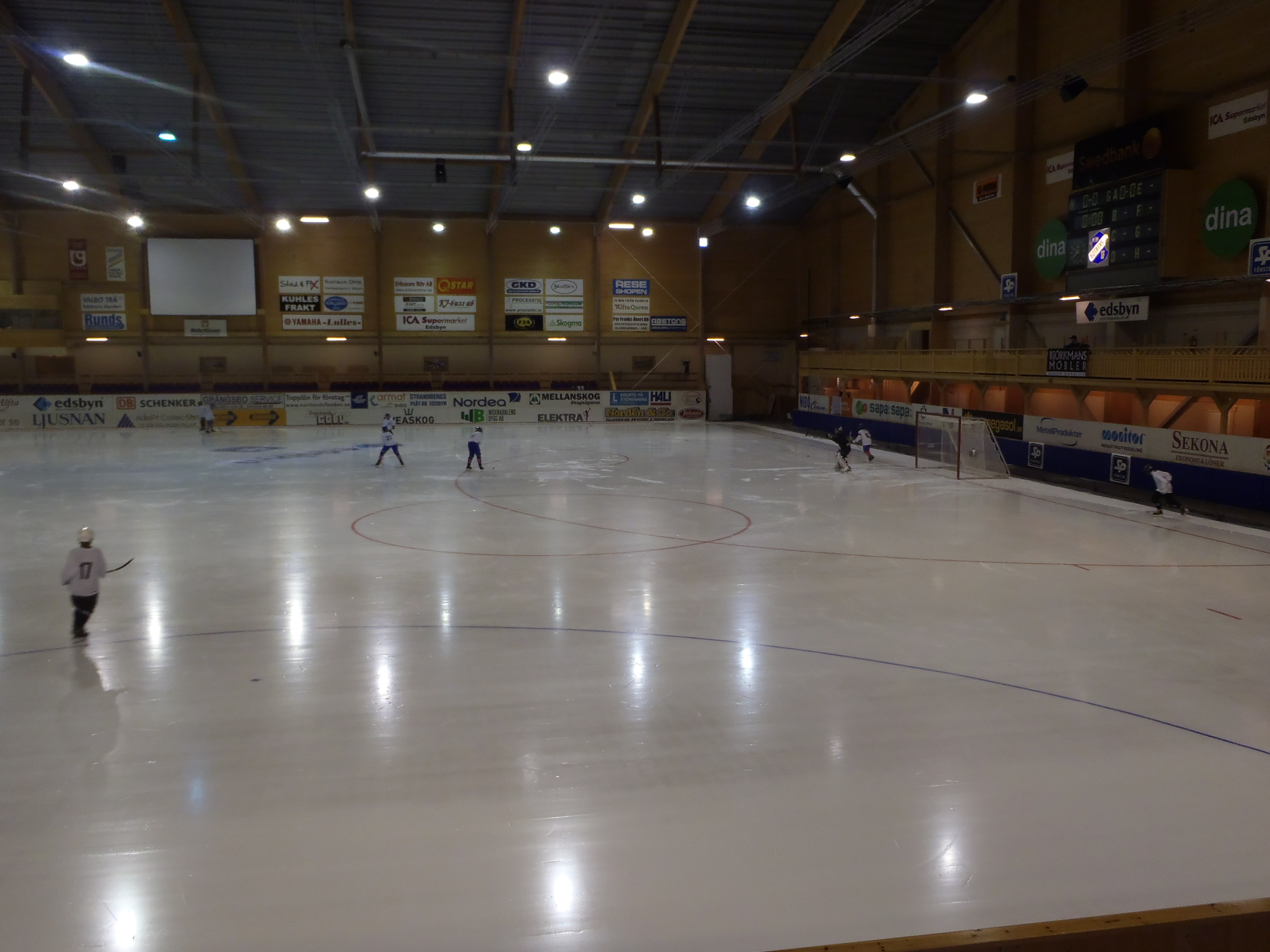
Interior of Edsbyn Arena

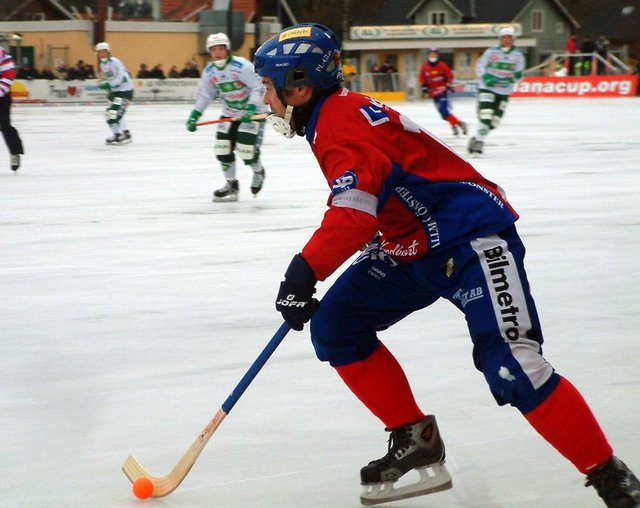
Bandy player Magnus Olsson
