= Falu BS =

Swedish bandy club

- City: Falun, Sweden
- League: Allsvenskan
- Founded: 1935; 91 years ago
- Home arena: Lugnets Isstadion
- Website: falubsbandy.com

Falu Bandysällskap, Falu BS, is a bandy club from Falun in Sweden.

Falu BS was founded as Falu Bollsällskap on 10 December 1935, by merging Falu BK, Holmens IF, Falu SK and IFK Falun. All these clubs were playing bandy.

In 1936 the new club Falu BS started in Swedish division II. The jersey was like the one Falu BK had used, copper brown with the text "FALUN" on the chest. The home games were played at Främbyviken or Kvarnbergsplan (later to be called Kopparvallen).

In 1939/1940 the team reached Bandyallsvenskan, the highest league in Sweden. Falu BS was second overall, only Sandvikens AIK were better. From this season on the "classic" colours of the team were used, blue jerseys with yellow collars. The team did not last more than one season in the Bandyallsvenska this time, but got back later.

The most successful time were the early 1970s, when the club became Swedish champions in 1971 and 1974. Falu BS also were the runners-up in 1999. The team also became world champions for clubs by winning the Bandy World Cup in 1998.

In 2013, Falu Bollsällskap filed for bankruptcy, but was then reconstructed as Falu Bandysällskap with the same logo and colours as before.

They play at the Lugnet sports complex.

== Honours ==
=== Domestic ===
- Swedish Champions:
  - Winners (2): 1970/71, 1973/74
  - Runners-up (1): 1975/76

== International ==
- World Cup:
  - Winners (1): 1998
  - Runners-up (1): 1996
- European Cup:
  - Runners-up (1): 1974

== See also ==
- Category:Falu BS players
