= 2015 Bandy World Championship =

XXXVth Bandy World Championship

Tournament details
- Host country: Russia
- City: Khabarovsk
- Venue: Arena Yerofey
- Dates: 29 March – 4 April 2015
- Teams: 16

Final positions
- Champions: Russia (9th title)
- Runners-up: Sweden
- Third place: Kazakhstan
- Fourth place: Finland

Tournament statistics
- Games played: 22
- Goals scored: 294 (13.36 per game)
- Scoring leader(s): Andrey Kabanov Belarus (15 goals)

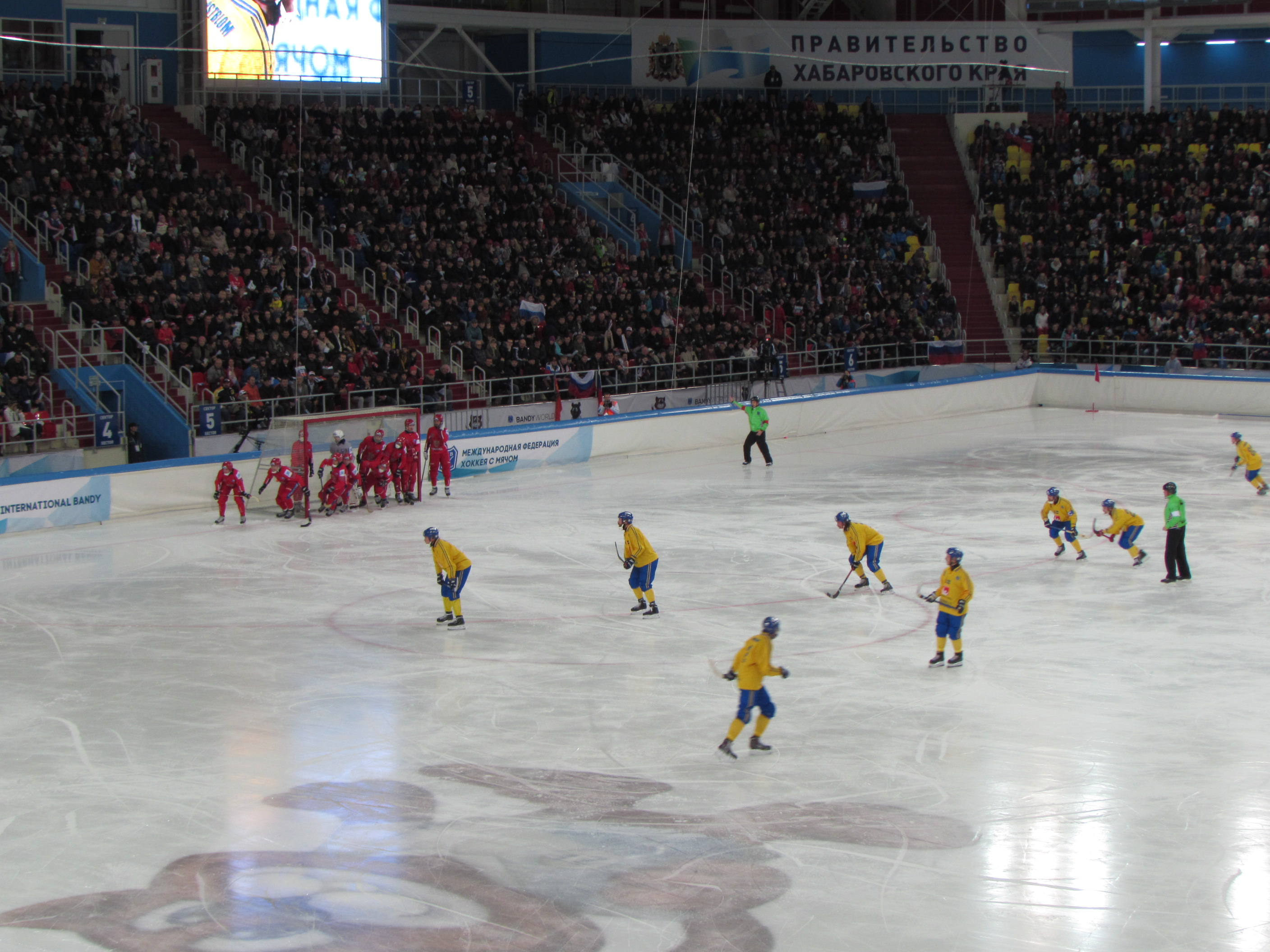
A corner during the final

2015 Bandy World Championship 2015 was the XXXVth Bandy World Championship. At the FIB congress held during the XXXIVth World Championship in 2014, it was announced that Khabarovsk in Russia had been elected as host city. It was also decided the Group A tournament would be played around the end of March/beginning of April, which means it would take place when the national bandy leagues in the major bandy playing countries, Finland, Norway, Russia and Sweden, would be finished for the season. Group B was played between February 1 and 6 and hit a new record attendance, already before the match for the bronze and the final.

High-profile people who visited the Group A tournament include the Prime Minister of Russia, Dmitry Medvedev, and the President of Ice Hockey Federation of Russia, the legendary goaltender Vladislav Tretiak.

The mascots of the games were a bear and a tiger, named Тоша and Ероша, were inspired by the animals in the coat of arms of Khabarovsk.

Ukraine refused to take part in the Russian-hosted championship because of the Russian annexation of Crimea the previous year.

== Host selection ==
On 5 December 2013, the Russian news agency AmurMedia (which quoted Russian Internet site Sportbox.ru) reported that the decision on host city was made, after a decision by the working committee of FIB.

The candidates were:

- Minsk, Belarus
- Helsinki, Finland
- Khabarovsk, Russia

Minsk withdrew its candidacy in August 2013. Khabarovsk won over Helsinki because there is an indoor arena in the city.

== Participating teams ==
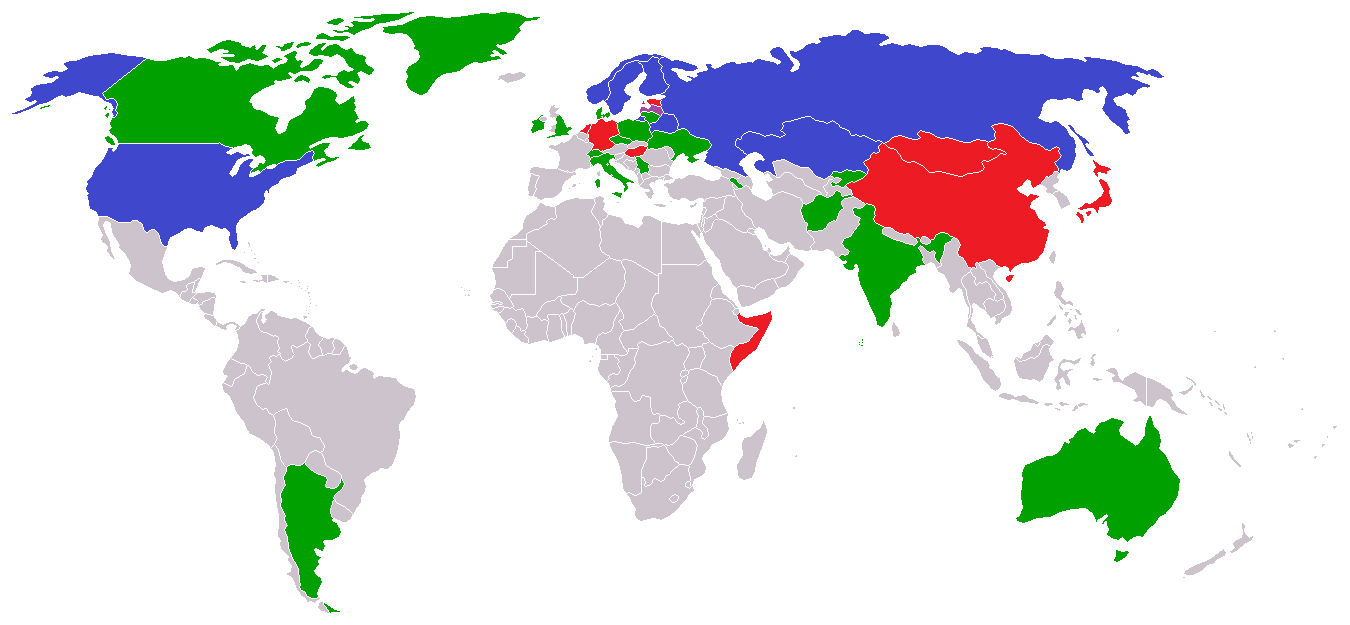
Participating countries in the Bandy World Championship 2015. Blue: Division A Red: Division B Purple: both divisions Green: members of the Federation of International Bandy not participating in this year's World Championship

=== Division A ===
- Belarus
- Finland
- Kazakhstan
- Latvia
- Norway
- Russia
- Sweden
- United States

=== Division B ===
- China
- Estonia
- Germany
- Hungary
- Japan
- Latvia
- Mongolia
- Netherlands
- Somalia

Latvia won Division B in 2014 and was thus promoted to Division A for 2015. However, the Latvians made an application to play in Division B this year too, and this was approved by the Federation of International Bandy. Latvia was therefore playing in both divisions this year. This was made possible by the divisions not being played at the same time, Division B was being played in early February while Division A was being played in late March/early April.

== Venues ==
Khabarovsk
Arena Yerofey
Capacity: 10,000
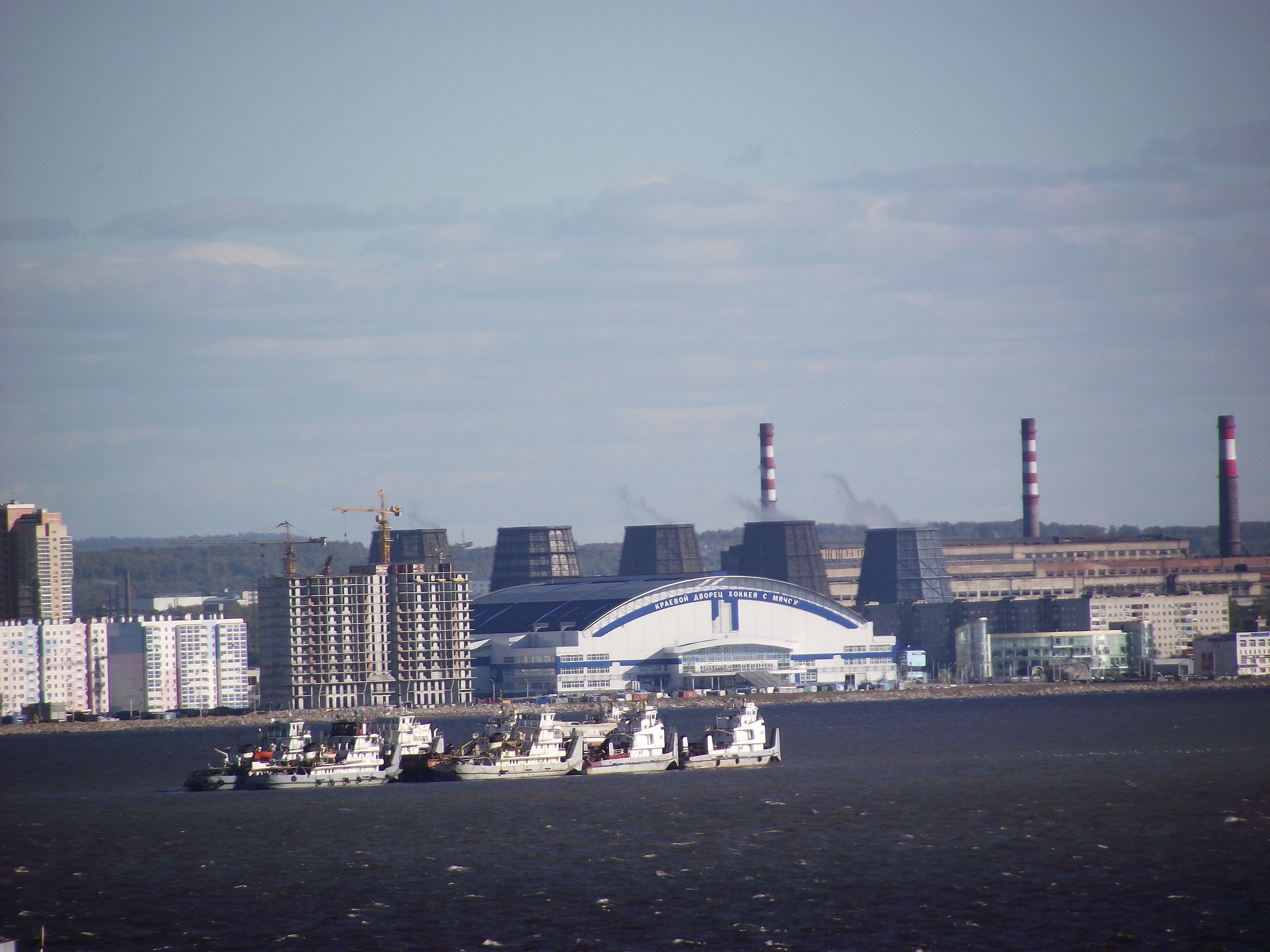

== Division A ==
After drawn games in the group stage, a penalty shootout is held to determine final placings in the event of teams finishing on equal points

=== Preliminary round ===
==== Group A ====
Pos	Team	Pld	W	D	L	GF	GA	GD	Pts
1	Sweden	3	2	1	0	15	6	+9	5 (Note: Sweden won after-match penalties against Russia 5–4.)
2	Russia (H)	3	2	1	0	20	3	+17	5
3	Kazakhstan	3	0	1	2	8	22	−14	1 (Note: Kazakhstan won after-match penalties against Finland 4–3.)
4	Finland	3	0	1	2	5	17	−12	1

(H) Hosts
Notes:

All times are local (UTC+10).

29 March 2015
16:30

Sweden	5–1	Finland
D. Andersson 10', 89'; J. Nilsson 11'; P. Nilsson 36', 62'	Report	Laakkonen 59'

Arena Yerofey, Khabarovsk
Attendance: 2,222
Referee: Grigory Minaev (Russia)
29 March 2015
20:00

Kazakhstan	1–10	Russia
Morokov 30'	Report	Ivanushkin 8', 10', 40', 76'; Ryazantsev 12', 88', 90'; Dergayev 44', 82'; Lomanov 50'

Arena Yerofey, Khabarovsk
Attendance: 7,292
Referee: Petri Kuusela (Finland)
30 March 2015
16:30

Sweden	9–4	Kazakhstan
P. Nilsson 1', 29', 81'; Esplund 30', 35'; Edlund 34' (pen), 71' (pen), 78'; Mossberg 63'	Report	Gorchakov 46'; Issaliev 49'; Golubkov 56' (pen); Slautin 59'

Arena Yerofey, Khabarovsk
Attendance: 1,321
Referee: Petri Kuusela (Finland)
30 March 2015
20:00

Russia	9–1	Finland
Lomanov 7', 49'; Zakharov 20', 60', 77'; Ivanushkin 25'; Dzhusoyev 50'; Ryazantsev 61'; Ishkeldin 85'	Report	Hauska 35'

Arena Yerofey, Khabarovsk
Attendance: 8,962
Referee: Peter Öhrlund (Sweden)
31 March 2015
16:30

Kazakhstan	3–3	Finland
Slautin 42'; Issaliev 48'; Bedarev 54'	Report	Hauska 36'; Lukkarila 44', 79'

Arena Yerofey, Khabarovsk
Attendance: 1,453
Referee: Grigory Minaev (Russia)
31 March 2015
20:00

Russia	1–1	Sweden
Tyukavin 53'	Report	Mossberg 53'

Arena Yerofey, Khabarovsk
Attendance: 9,889
Referee: Simo Pyysing (Finland)

==== Group B ====
Pos	Team	Pld	W	D	L	GF	GA	GD	Pts
1	Norway	3	2	1	0	23	15	+8	5
2	Belarus	3	2	0	1	27	22	+5	4
3	United States	3	1	1	1	20	20	0	3
4	Latvia	3	0	0	3	10	23	−13	0

29 March 2015
10:00

United States	5–2	Latvia
Richardson 46', 68'; Keseley 71'; Blucher 78'; Brown 81'	Report	Blems 47'; Matveevs 54'

Arena Yerofey, Khabarovsk
Attendance: 1,276
Referee: Simo Pyysing (Finland)
29 March 2015
13:00

Belarus	5–9	Norway
Bratchenko 15'; Kabanov 17', 30', 46', 66' (pen)	Report	Austad 3' (pen); Waaler 8'; Hammerstad 11'; Jensen 26'; Kristoffersen 39', 50'; C. Randsborg 60'; F. Randsborg 70', 87'

Arena Yerofey, Khabarovsk
Attendance: 1,342
Referee: Peter Öhrlund (Sweden)
30 March 2015
10:00

Latvia	4–10	Belarus
Ziemiņš 52', 75', 90'; Blems 90'	Report	Kabanov 3', 14'; Kozlov 7'; Yusupov 26', 37', 49', 77'; Savchenko 30'; Chernetskiy 45'; Bratchenko 58'

Arena Yerofey, Khabarovsk
Attendance: 418
Referee: Simo Pyysing (Finland)
30 March 2015
13:00

Norway	6–6	United States
Kristoffersen 7', 9', 35'; F. Randsborg 30'; Jensen 51'; Tjomsland 62'	Report	Blucher 16', 80'; Richardson 34'; Keseley 46'; Brown 47', 52'

Arena Yerofey, Khabarovsk
Attendance: 746
Referee: Grigoriy Minaev (Russia)
31 March 2015
10:00

Latvia	4–8	Norway
Kudrjavtsev 23'; Ziemiņš 38'; Befus 57'; Kadnajs 85' (pen)	Report	Waaler 15', 48', 50', 73'; Jensen 25'; Moen 45'; Kristoffersen 46', 63'

Arena Yerofey, Khabarovsk
Attendance: 501
Referee: Petri Kuusela (Finland)
31 March 2015
13:00

Belarus	12–9	United States
Chernetskiy 6'; Kabanov 7', 58', 84'; Kozlov 10', 60'; Yusupov 23', 31', 34'; Bratchenko 38', 56'; Savchenko 81'	Report	Keseley 5', 79'; Richardson 28' (pen), 45' (pen), 59'; Carman 32', 64'; Blucher 74'; Brown 86'

Arena Yerofey, Khabarovsk
Attendance: 1,211
Referee: Peter Öhrlund (Sweden)

=== Knockout stage ===
Quarter-finals
1 April – Khabarovsk
Finland	13
Norway	5
1 April – Khabarovsk
Sweden	14
Latvia	2
1 April – Khabarovsk
Kazakhstan	26
Belarus	8
1 April – Khabarovsk
Russia	17
United States	2

Semi-finals
2 April – Khabarovsk
Finland	1
Sweden	10
2 April – Khabarovsk
Kazakhstan	0
Russia	14

Final
4 April – Khabarovsk
Sweden	3
Russia	5
Third place
3 April – Khabarovsk
Finland	6
Kazakhstan	8

==== Quarter-finals ====
1 April 2015
10:00

Kazakhstan	26–8	Belarus
	Report

Arena Yerofey, Khabarovsk
1 April 2015
13:00

Finland	13–5	Norway
	Report

Arena Yerofey, Khabarovsk
1 April 2015
16:30

Sweden	14–2	Latvia
	Report

Arena Yerofey, Khabarovsk
1 April 2015
20:00

Russia	17–2	United States
	Report

Arena Yerofey, Khabarovsk

==== Semi-finals ====
2 April 2015
16:00

Finland	1–10	Sweden
Lukkarila 82'	Report	Gilljam 13', 79'; Berlin 21'; D. Andersson 42', 53', 81'; Edlund 50', 61'; Säfström 51'; P. Nilsson 73'

Arena Yerofey, Khabarovsk
Attendance: 2,323
Referee: Grigoriy Minaev (Russia)
2 April 2015
20:00

Kazakhstan	0–14	Russia
	Report	Lomanov 4', 52'; Ishkeldin 28'; Ivanushkin 29', 40', 45', 77', 89'; Zakharov 42'; Shaburov 57'; Shevtsov 60', 65'; Ivanov 76'; Dergayev 82'

Arena Yerofey, Khabarovsk
Attendance: 7,274
Referee: Peter Öhrlund (Sweden)

==== Third place game ====
3 April 2015
20:00

Finland	6–8	Kazakhstan
	Report

Arena Yerofey, Khabarovsk

==== Final ====
4 April 2015
16:00

Sweden	3–5	Russia
D. Andersson 3'; Hellmyrs 7'; P. Nilsson 83'	Report	Lomanov 37', 85'; Tyukavin 84'; Ryazantsev 87'; Ishkeldin 90'

Arena Yerofey, Khabarovsk
Attendance: 10,000
Referee: Petri Kuusela (Finland)

=== Consolation tournament ===
==== 7th place game ====
3 April 2015
12:00

Latvia	6–4	United States
	Report

Arena Yerofey, Khabarovsk

==== 5th place game ====
3 April 2015
16:00

Belarus	6–16	Norway
	Report

Arena Yerofey, Khabarovsk

=== Final standings ===
1.	Russia
2.	Sweden
3.	Kazakhstan
4.	Finland
5.	Norway
6.	Belarus
7.	Latvia
8.	United States

=== Statistics ===
==== Goalscorers ====
15 goals

- (Belarus) Andrey Kabanov

13 goals

- (Russia) Yevgeny Ivanushkin

11 goals

- (Sweden) Patrik Nilsson
- (Belarus) Sergey Yusupov

9 goals

- (Norway) Nikolai Rustad Jensen
- (Norway) Sondre Kristoffersen
- (Russia) Sergey Lomanov, Jr.

8 goals

- (Sweden) Daniel Andersson
- (Norway) Christian Waaler

7 goals

- (Sweden) Christoffer Edlund
- (Finland) Mikko Lukkarila
- (Kazakhstan) Sergey Pochkunov
- (United States) Daren Richardson
- (Kazakhstan) Denis Slautin

6 goals

- (Latvia) Maksim Blem
- (Kazakhstan) Rauan Issaliev
- (Finland) Sami Laakkonen
- (Russia) Pavel Ryazantsev
- (Russia) Pyotr Zakharov

5 goals

- (United States) Jacob Blucher
- (Russia) Yevgeny Dergayev
- (Kazakhstan) Pavel Dubovik
- (Russia) Nikita Ivanov
- (Kazakhstan) Alexander Nasonov
- (Latvia) Lauris Ziemiņš

4 goals

- (Norway) Marius Austad
- (Belarus) Vyacheslav Bratchenko
- (United States) Kevin Brown
- (Sweden) Adam Gilljam
- (United States) Jonathan Keseley
- (Belarus) Alexander Kozlov
- (Norway) Fredrik Randsborg
- (Russia) Ivan Shevtsov

3 goals

- (Kazakhstan) Leonid Bedarev
- (Belarus) Sergey Chernetsskiy
- (Finland) Tommi Hauska
- (Russia) Maksim Ishkeldin
- (Sweden) Jonas Nilsson
- (Kazakhstan) Iskander Nugmanov
- (Belarus) Konstantin Savchenko

2 goals

- (Latvia) Artur Befus
- (United States) Mike Carman
- (Sweden) Johan Esplund
- (Kazakhstan) Maxim Gavrilenko
- (Norway) Fritjof Hagberg
- (Norway) Sondre Hammerstad
- (Finland) Pekka Hiltunen
- (Norway) Magnus Hogevold
- (Latvia) Jūlijs Kadnajs
- (United States) Mikael Lickteig
- (Finland) Teemu Määttä
- (Norway) Petter Renstrom Moem
- (Finland) Ilari Moisala
- (Sweden) Daniel Mossberg
- (Sweden) Erik Säfström
- (Russia) Aleksandr Tyukavin

1 goal

- (Finland) Ville Aaltonen
- (Sweden) Daniel Berlin
- (Russia) Alan Dzhusoyev
- (Sweden) Johan Östblom
- (Kazakhstan) Ruslan Galyautdinov
- (Latvia) Romans Glazkov
- (Kazakhstan) Anatoly Golubkov
- (Kazakhstan) Sergey Gorchakov
- (Russia) Vasily Granovskiy
- (Sweden) Per Hellmyrs
- (Belarus) Maxim Koshelev
- (Latvia) Jegor Kudrjavcev
- (Finland) Markus Kumpuoja
- (Latvia) Maksim Matveev
- (Kazakhstan) Andrey Morokov
- (Finland) Eetu Peuhuri
- (United States) David Plaunt
- (Norway) Christian Randsborg
- (Russia) Sergey Shaburov
- (United States) Brett Stolpestad
- (Norway) Jonas Tjomsland

== Division B ==
=== Preliminary round ===
==== Group A ====
Pos	Team	Pld	W	D	L	GF	GA	GD	Pts	Qualification
1	Estonia	3	2	1	0	17	14	+3	5	Quarterfinals
2	Latvia	3	2	0	1	12	6	+6	4	Quarterfinals
3	Hungary	3	1	0	2	12	14	−2	2	Quarterfinals
4	Japan	3	0	1	2	6	13	−7	1	Quarterfinals

1 February 2015

Estonia	8–6	Hungary

Arena Yerofey, Khabarovsk
1 February 2015

Latvia	4–0	Japan

Arena Yerofey, Khabarovsk
2 February 2015

Estonia	5–4	Latvia

Arena Yerofey, Khabarovsk
2 February 2015

Hungary	5–2	Japan

Arena Yerofey, Khabarovsk
3 February 2015

Japan	4–4	Estonia

Arena Yerofey, Khabarovsk
3 February 2015

Latvia	4–1	Hungary

Arena Yerofey, Khabarovsk

==== Group B ====
Matches in Group B are 60 minutes in duration rather than the standard 90 minutes.

Pos	Team	Pld	W	D	L	GF	GA	GD	Pts	Qualification
1	Netherlands	4	3	1	0	32	4	+28	7	Quarterfinals
2	Germany	4	3	0	1	25	9	+16	6	Quarterfinals
3	Mongolia	4	2	1	1	19	6	+13	5	Quarterfinals
4	China	4	1	0	3	12	19	−7	2	Quarterfinals
5	Somalia	4	0	0	4	2	52	−50	0	8th place game

1 February 2015

Mongolia	3–2	China

Arena Yerofey, Khabarovsk
1 February 2015

Somalia	0–18	Netherlands

Arena Yerofey, Khabarovsk
1 February 2015

Germany	4–2	Mongolia

Arena Yerofey, Khabarovsk
2 February 2015

China	1–9	Netherlands

Arena Yerofey, Khabarovsk
2 February 2015

Somalia	1–12	Germany

Arena Yerofey, Khabarovsk
2 February 2015

Mongolia	14–0	Somalia

Arena Yerofey, Khabarovsk
2 February 2015

Netherlands	5–3	Germany

Arena Yerofey, Khabarovsk
3 February 2014

China	8–1	Somalia

Arena Yerofey, Khabarovsk
3 February 2014

Netherlands	0–0	Mongolia

Arena Yerofey, Khabarovsk
3 February 2014

Germany	6–1	China

Arena Yerofey, Khabarovsk

=== Knockout stage ===
Quarter-finals
4 February – Khabarovsk
Estonia	14
China	3
4 February – Khabarovsk
Japan	2
Netherlands	4
4 February – Khabarovsk
Latvia	11
Mongolia	5
4 February – Khabarovsk
Hungary	5
Germany	4

Semi-finals
5 February – Khabarovsk
Estonia	8
Netherlands	2
5 February – Khabarovsk
Latvia	7
Hungary	5

Final
6 February – Khabarovsk
Estonia	3
Latvia	8
Third place
6 February – Khabarovsk
Netherlands	1
Hungary	9

==== Quarter-finals ====
4 February 2015

Estonia	14–3	China

Arena Yerofey, Khabarovsk
4 February 2015

Japan	2–4	Netherlands

Arena Yerofey, Khabarovsk
4 February 2015

Latvia	11–5	Mongolia

Arena Yerofey, Khabarovsk
4 February 2015

Hungary	5–4	Germany

Arena Yerofey, Khabarovsk

==== 7th place game ====
The match was 60 minutes rather than standard 90 minutes.

5 February 2015

Mongolia	7–5	China

Arena Yerofey, Khabarovsk

==== 5th place game ====
The match was 60 minutes rather than standard 90 minutes.

5 February 2015

Japan	1–3	Germany

Arena Yerofey, Khabarovsk

==== 8th place game ====
The match was 60 minutes rather than standard 90 minutes.

5 February 2015

China	11–1	Somalia

Arena Yerofey, Khabarovsk

==== Semi-finals ====
5 February 2015

Estonia	8–2	Netherlands

Arena Yerofey, Khabarovsk
5 February 2015

Latvia	7–5	Hungary

Arena Yerofey, Khabarovsk

==== Third place game ====
6 February 2015

Netherlands	1–9	Hungary

Arena Yerofey, Khabarovsk

==== Final ====
6 February 2015

Estonia	3–8	Latvia

Arena Yerofey, Khabarovsk

=== Final standings ===
1.	Latvia
2.	Estonia
3.	Hungary
4.	Netherlands
5.	Germany
6.	Japan
7.	Mongolia
8.	China
9.	Somalia

== Broadcasting ==
- Russia: VGTRK
- Sweden: TV12
- International: Online at http://bandyvm2015.ru/en/news/?newsid=268
