= 2009 Bandy World Championship =

XXIXth Bandy World Championship

Tournament details
- Host country: Sweden
- Venue(s): 6 (in 5 host cities)
- Dates: 18–25 January 2009
- Teams: 13

Final positions
- Champions: Sweden
- Runner-up: Russia
- Third place: Finland
- Fourth place: Kazakhstan

Tournament statistics
- Scoring leader(s): Joakim Hedqvist & Yevgeny Ivanushkin (14 goals)

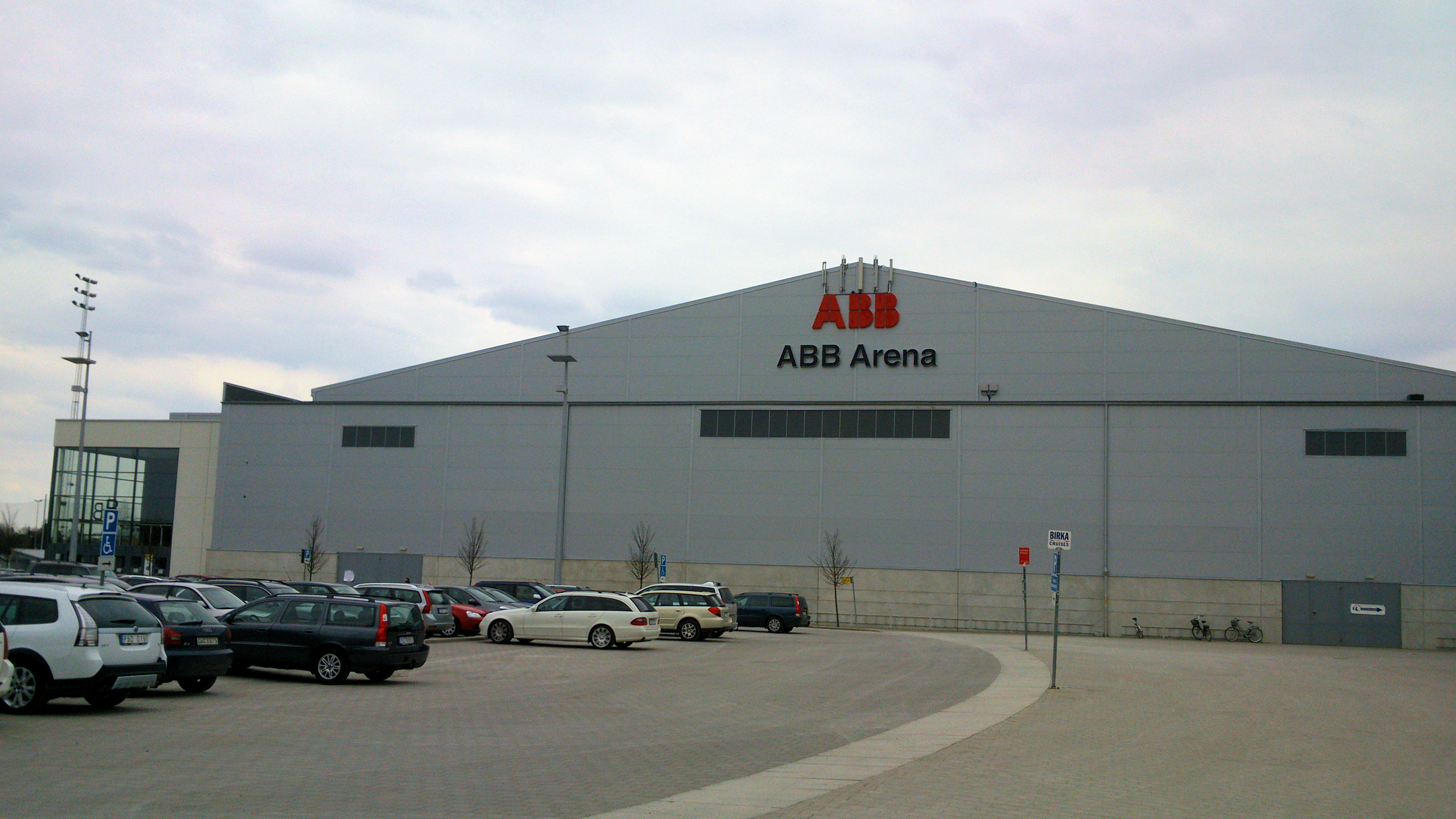
ABB Arena Syd in Västerås, Sweden. Bandy hall of Rocklunda sports park in Västerås, Sweden, where the championship was played.

The Bandy World Championship 2009 was held from 18 to 25 January in Västerås, Sweden. Men's teams from 13 countries participated in the 2009 competition: Belarus, Finland, Kazakhstan, Norway, Russia, Sweden (group A) and Canada, Estonia, Hungary, Latvia, Mongolia, the Netherlands and the United States (group B). Belarus retained their place in group A by beating the United States in a play-off in the previous tournament held in 2008. 44 games were played. Four out of these were played on sites other than Västerås. Those games were played in Solna, Stockholm, Eskilstuna and Uppsala. The main venues were ABB Arena Syd in Västerås, Sweden's largest indoor arena for bandy, and Hakonplan, an outdoor stadium. These two arenas are in the same recreation area in Västerås, Rocklunda sports park.

The six teams of Group A competed for the championship, while the seven teams in Group B competed for a chance to play in Group A in 2010. Sweden defeated Russia in the final, 6–1, to take the gold medal. Finland took the bronze, while Kazakhstan and Norway earned fourth and fifth places, respectively. Belarus, after finishing at the bottom of the Group A pool, had to face the winner of the Group B pool to retain its place in the championship group for the next year. For the fifth straight year, Belarus beat the United States in this match.

== Venues ==
ABB Arena Syd and Hakonplan in Västerås staged 40 games. The other venues were:

- Bergshamra IP, Solna
- Eskilstuna Isstadion, Eskilstuna
- Studenternas IP, Uppsala
- Zinkensdamms IP, Stockholm

== Rules ==
Team rosters are limited to 17 players in each game, with 11 playing and 6 reserves at a time. Game durations are 90 minutes for Group A matches and 60 minutes for Group B matches, in each case divided into equal halves.

1. Group A, the World Cup Championship, starts as a single-match round robin league. The top four teams advance to the semifinals, where the team placed as number 1 meets number 4, and number 2 meets number 3. The two winners advance to the final, while the losers play a bronze match.
2. Group B also begins with a round robin. The winner of the preliminary round plays against the last-place team from Group A for the right to play in Group A in 2010. The remaining teams are paired off for placement matches.
3. No game can end with a draw—if a preliminary round match is tied after regulation, or a playoff match is tied after extra time, a penalty stroke competition is arranged. Each team takes five penalty shots, with different strikers. If it is still a draw, the penalty shots will continue one by one until a decisive result has been attained. Regardless of the result of the penalty strokes, the game is counted as a draw in the table for preliminary pool matches.
4. The number of points is decisive for placing in the preliminary round. Two points are scored for a win, one for a draw, and none for a loss.
  1. Should the number of points be equal for two teams, the result between those two teams (including penalty strokes, if necessary) in the preliminary round is decisive.
  2. Should the number of points be equal for three or four teams, the score difference among tied teams is the first tie-breaker followed by goals scored. Only regulation time goals are counted, not penalty strokes. If this leaves two teams still tied, the tie between the two remaining teams is broken by head-to-head result.
  3. If separation still is not possible, the score difference from all matches in the preliminary round is used.
  4. If teams still can't be separated, placing is done by drawing of lots.
5. All matches following the preliminary round are to be played until the winner is decided. If it is a draw after 90 or 60 minutes the match shall be extended with sudden death overtime, with two halves of 15 minutes. If it is still a draw, penalty strokes will be used.

== Participating teams ==
=== Division A ===
- Finland
- Kazakhstan
- Norway
- Russia
- Sweden
- Belarus

=== Division B ===
- Estonia
- Canada
- Latvia
- Mongolia
- Netherlands
- Hungary
- United States

== Division A ==
=== Preliminary round ===
| Team advanced to the semifinals (top 4 teams) |
| Team will play in the qualification game (bottom 1 team) |

| Team | Pld | W | D | L | GF | GA | GD | Pts |
|---|---|---|---|---|---|---|---|---|
| Sweden | 5 | 4 | 1 | 0 | 42 | 12 | +30 | 9 |
| Russia | 5 | 4 | 1 | 0 | 63 | 9 | +54 | 9 |
| Finland | 5 | 3 | 0 | 2 | 29 | 25 | +4 | 6 |
| Kazakhstan | 5 | 2 | 0 | 3 | 20 | 32 | −12 | 4 |
| Norway | 5 | 1 | 0 | 4 | 11 | 51 | −40 | 2 |
| Belarus | 5 | 0 | 0 | 5 | 16 | 52 | −36 | 0 |

| January 18, 2009; 12:00; ABB Arena Syd | Russia | 19 – 0 (7–0) | Norway |

| January 18, 2009; 15:45; ABB Arena Syd | Sweden | 8 – 1 (2–0) | Finland |

| January 18, 2009; 19:00; ABB Arena Syd | Kazakhstan | 7 – 5 (6–3) | Belarus |

| January 19, 2009; 13:00; ABB Arena Syd | Russia | 14 – 2 (7–2) | Belarus |

| January 19, 2009; 16:30; ABB Arena Syd | Finland | 5 – 0 (3–0) | Norway |

| January 19, 2009; 19:00; Eskilstuna Isstadion | Sweden | 4 – 3 (0–2) | Kazakhstan |

| January 20, 2009; 13:00; ABB Arena Syd | Belarus | 1 – 12 (0–6) | Finland |

| January 20, 2009; 16:30; ABB Arena Syd | Russia | 13 – 2 (6–1) | Kazakhstan |

| January 20, 2009; 19:00; Bergshamra IP | Sweden | 15 – 3 (8–0) | Norway |

| January 21, 2009; 11:30; ABB Arena Syd | Belarus | 5 – 6 (4–3) | Norway |

| January 21, 2009; 19:30; Zinkensdamms IP | Sweden | 2 – 2 (1–2) | Russia |

| January 21, 2009; 19:30; ABB Arena Syd | Finland | 8 – 1 (4–1) | Kazakhstan |

| January 22, 2009; 11:30; ABB Arena Syd | Sweden | 13 – 3 (8–1) | Belarus |

| January 22, 2009; 17:00; ABB Arena Syd | Kazakhstan | 7 – 2 (3–1) | Norway |

| January 22, 2009; 19:00; Studenternas IP | Russia | 15 – 3 (6–2) | Finland |

=== Semifinals ===
| January 24, 2009; 15:30; ABB Arena Syd | Sweden | 8 – 3 (5–3) | Kazakhstan |

| January 24, 2009; 19:00; ABB Arena Syd | Russia | 10 – 4 (5–0) | Finland |

=== Match for 3rd place ===
| January 25, 2009; 12:00; ABB Arena Syd | Kazakhstan | 5 – 7 (3–3) | Finland |

=== Final ===
| January 25, 2009; 15:30; ABB Arena Syd | Sweden | 6 – 1 (1–1) | Russia |

=== Statistics ===
Statistics for goalscorers during Bandy World Championships 2009.

==== Goalscorers ====
14 goals

- (Sweden) Joakim Hedqvist
- (Russia) Yevgeny Ivanushkin

13 goals

- (Finland) Sami Laakkonen
- (Sweden) Patrik Nilsson
- (Russia) Pavel Ryazantsev

12 goals

- (Russia) Sergey Obukhov

9 goals

- (Kazakhstan) Vyacheslav Bronnikov
- (Russia) Sergey Lomanov, Jr.

7 goals

- (Finland) Rasmus Lindqvist
- (Russia) Ivan Maksimov
- (Russia) Mikhail Sveshnikov

6 goals

- (Belarus) Sergey Cherneckiy
- (Finland) Markus Kumpuoja
- (Sweden) Anders Östling

5 goals

- (Belarus) Evgeni Chvalko
- (Sweden) Christoffer Edlund
- (Kazakhstan) Rauan Issaliyev

4 goals

- (Sweden) Per Hellmyrs
- (Kazakhstan) Yuriy Loginov
- (Russia) Alexander Tukavin
- (Kazakhstan) Alexey Zagarskiy

3 goals

- (Finland) Ville Aaltonen
- (Sweden) Marcus Bergwall
- (Norway) Pål Hanssen
- (Kazakhstan) Andrey Kovalyov
- (Norway) Jan Fredrik Løland
- (Finland) Mikko Lukkarila
- (Sweden) Andreas Westh

2 goals

- (Kazakhstan) Leonid Bedarev
- (Sweden) Daniel Berlin
- (Finland) Antti Ekman
- (Finland) Kimmo Huotelin
- (Norway) Kjetil Johansen
- (Russia) Denis Kriushenkov
- (Norway) Christer Lystad
- (Russia) Sergey Shaburov
- (Belarus) Artiom Zibarev

1 goals

- (Finland) Mikko Aarni
- (Sweden) Johan Andersson
- (Belarus) Artem Botvenkov
- (Belarus) Dmitriy Duben
- (Sweden) Jonas Edling
- (Sweden) Stefan Erixon
- (Sweden) Daniel Jonsson
- (Russia) Aleksander Kim
- (Kazakhstan) Alexey Kurochkin
- (Finland) Petteri Lampinen
- (Finland) Juho Liukkonen
- (Sweden) Daniel Mossberg
- (Finland) Samuli Niskanen
- (Russia) Yury Pogrebnoy
- (Russia) Dmitri Starikov
- (Sweden) Daniel Välitalo
- (Russia) Yury Vikulin
- (Norway) Christian Waaler
- (Belarus) Yuriy Zenkov

== Division B ==
=== Preliminary round ===
| Team | Pld | W | D | L | GF | GA | GD | Pts |
|---|---|---|---|---|---|---|---|---|
| United States | 6 | 6 | 0 | 0 | 72 | 3 | +69 | 12 |
| Estonia | 6 | 5 | 0 | 1 | 29 | 24 | +5 | 10 |
| Canada | 6 | 4 | 0 | 2 | 38 | 17 | +21 | 8 |
| Latvia | 6 | 3 | 0 | 3 | 13 | 23 | −10 | 6 |
| Netherlands | 6 | 0 | 2 | 4 | 11 | 28 | −17 | 2 |
| Mongolia | 6 | 0 | 2 | 4 | 9 | 38 | −29 | 2 |
| Hungary | 6 | 0 | 2 | 4 | 8 | 47 | −39 | 2 |

| January 21, 2009; 09:00; Hakonplan | Netherlands | 1 – 3 (1–0) | Latvia |

| January 21, 2009; 09:00; ABB Arena Syd | Hungary | 1 – 1 (1–1) | Mongolia |

| January 21, 2009; 11:30; Hakonplan | Estonia | 4 – 3 (1–1) | Canada |

| January 21, 2009; 14:00; Hakonplan | Hungary | 0 – 17 (0–8) | United States |

| January 21, 2009; 14:30; ABB Arena Syd | Mongolia | 2 – 2 (1–0) | Netherlands |

| January 21, 2009; 17:00; ABB Arena Syd | Latvia | 0 – 5 (0–1) | Canada |

| January 21, 2009; 20:00; Hakonplan | Estonia | 0 – 12 (0–4) | United States |

| January 22, 2009; 09:00; ABB Arena Syd | Netherlands | 1 – 4 (0–0) | Estonia |

| January 22, 2009; 09:00; Hakonplan | Mongolia | 2 – 11 (1–4) | Canada |

| January 22, 2009; 14:00; Hakonplan | Hungary | 0 – 12 (0–8) | Canada |

| January 22, 2009; 14:30; ABB Arena Syd | United States | 9 – 0 (7–0) | Latvia |

| January 22, 2009; 16:30; Hakonplan | Mongolia | 1 – 4 (0–1) | Estonia |

| January 22, 2009; 20:00; ABB Arena Syd | Hungary | 0 – 2 (0–0) | Latvia |

| January 22, 2009; 20:00; Hakonplan | Netherlands | 1 – 9 (1–7) | United States |

| January 23, 2009; 09:00; Hakonplan | Netherlands | 2 – 6 (1–1) | Canada |

| January 23, 2009; 09:00; ABB Arena Syd | United States | 16 – 1 (8–0) | Mongolia |

| January 23, 2009; 11:30; ABB Arena Syd | Hungary | 3 – 11 (0–7) | Estonia |

| January 23, 2009; 13:00; Hakonplan | Mongolia | 2 – 4 (0–2) | Latvia |

| January 23, 2009; 17:00; Hakonplan | Hungary | 4 – 4 (3–0) | Netherlands |

| January 23, 2009; 18:00; ABB Arena Syd | United States | 9 – 1 (3–0) | Canada |

| January 23, 2009; 20:00; Hakonplan | Estonia | 6 – 4 (3–3) | Latvia |

=== Final Tour ===
Match 2nd place Group B

| January 24, 2009; 09:00; ABB Arena Syd | Estonia | 0 – 4 (0–2) | Canada |

Match 6th place Group B

| January 24, 2009; 09:00; Hakonplan | Hungary | 2 – 9 (2–2) | Mongolia |

Match 4th place Group B

| January 24, 2009; 12:00; Hakonplan | Latvia | 3 – 2 (1–2) | Netherlands |

=== Qualification for Group A ===
| January 25, 2009; 09:00; Hakonplan | Belarus | 3 – 1 (1–1) | United States |

== Ranking ==
Group B included

| Pl. | Team | M | GF | GA | P |
|---|---|---|---|---|---|
| 1. | Sweden | 7 | 56 | 16 | 13 |
| 2. | Russia | 7 | 74 | 19 | 11 |
| 3. | Finland | 7 | 40 | 48 | 8 |
| 4. | Kazakhstan | 7 | 28 | 47 | 4 |
| 5. | Norway | 5 | 11 | 51 | 2 |
| 6. | Belarus | 6 | 19 | 53 | 2 |
| 7. | United States | 7 | 73 | 6 | 12 |
| 8. | Canada | 7 | 42 | 17 | 10 |
| 9. | Estonia | 7 | 29 | 28 | 10 |
| 10. | Latvia | 7 | 16 | 25 | 8 |
| 11. | Netherlands | 7 | 13 | 30 | 2 |
| 12. | Mongolia | 7 | 17 | 49 | 4 |
| 13. | Hungary | 7 | 10 | 56 | 2 |

== FIB Broadcasting rights ==
- TF1 Group; Eurosport 2, Eurosport Asia
- Sweden; SVT
- Finland; YLE FST
- Eurosport 2 is broadcast in 46 countries with 11 of them in origin language
- Eurosport Asia Pacific is broadcast in 10 Asian countries; Japan, Malaysia, China, Hong Kong, Philippines, Australia, New Zealand, Thailand, Singapore, Indonesia.

== See also ==
- Bandy World Championship
