= Sports venue =

Building, structure, or place dedicated to sports

A sports venue is a building, structure, or place in which a sporting competition is held.

A stadium or arena is a place or venue for sports or other events and consists of a field or stage either partly or completely surrounded by a tiered structure designed to allow spectators to stand or sit and view the event.

There are various types of sporting venues, depending on the sport played. For example: the racetrack for car racing, the hippodrome for horse racing, the velodrome for cycling, and the swimming pool for swimming. Some sporting venues can accommodate over one hundred thousand spectators, such as the Indianapolis Motor Speedway in the United States, which has a capacity of 257,325 people.

== Types of sports venues ==
- Arena
- Area of water used for a regatta, e.g. Bosbaan, Lake Attersee, IJsselmeer or the Atlantic Ocean
- Ballpark
- Billiard hall
- Bowling alley
- Bullring
- Cricket ground
- Golf course
- Gym
- Horse racing venues (hippodrome)
- Ice hockey arena
- Motorsport venues (autodrome)
- Race track
- Riding hall
- Shooting range
- Ski jumping hill
- Speed skating rink
- Stadium
- Tennis court
- Swimming pool
- Velodrome
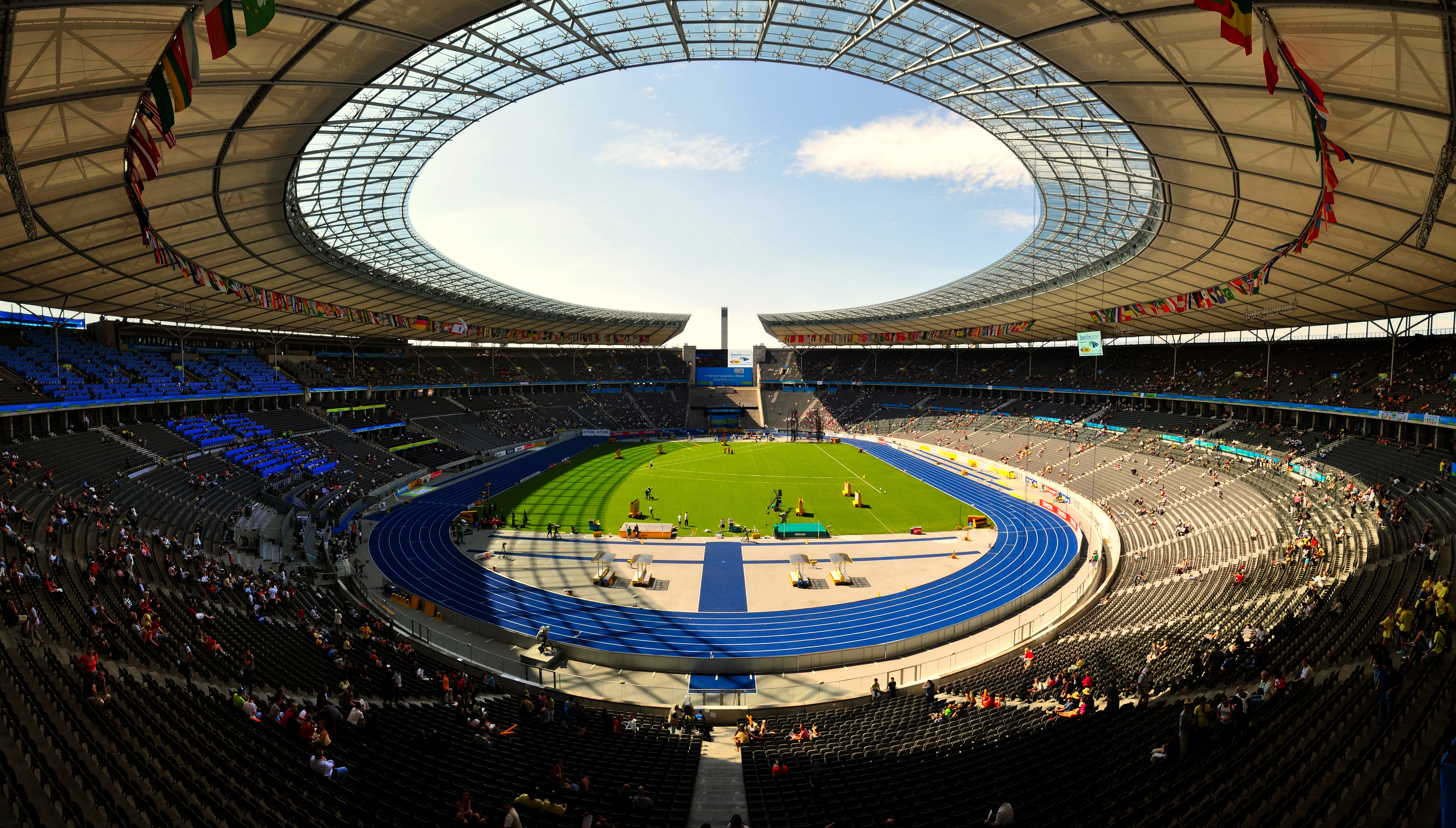
Olympiastadion in Berlin, Germany, where 2006 FIFA World Cup and 2009 World Championships in Athletics were held

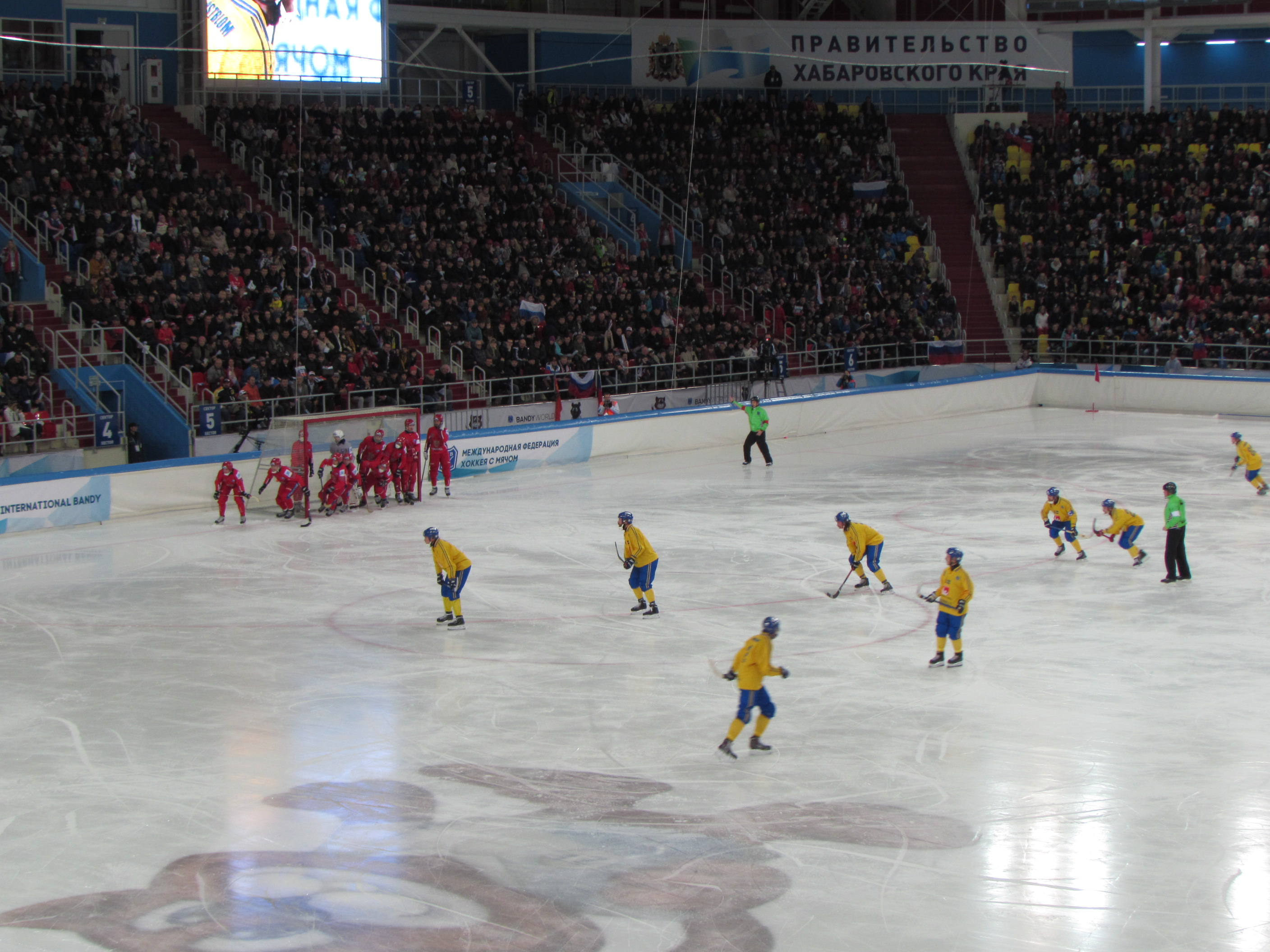
Arena Yerofey in Khabarovsk, Russia, where 2015 and 2018 Bandy World Championship's were held

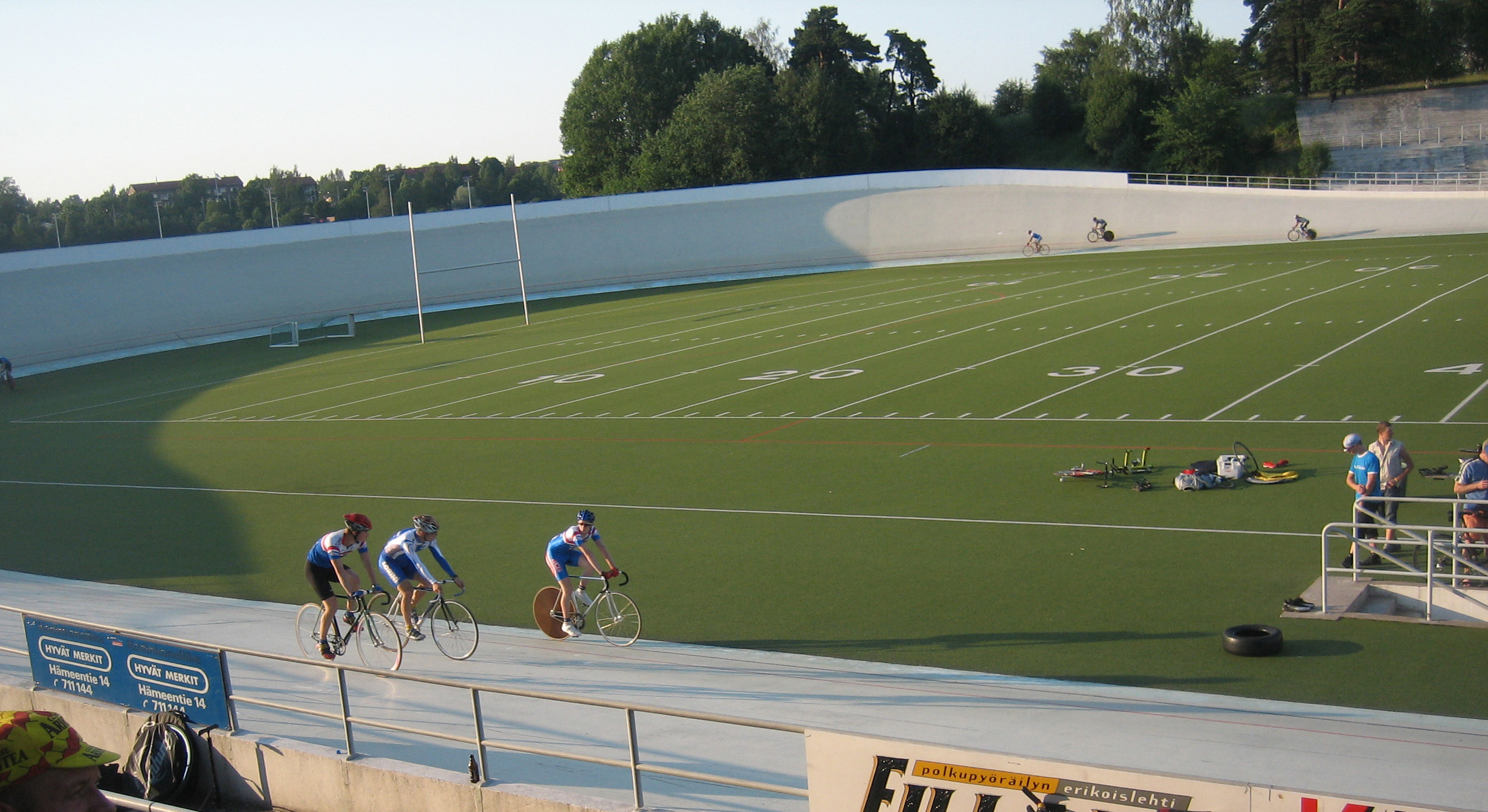
A view of the Helsinki Velodrome, an American football stadium in Helsinki, Finland

== See also ==
- Lists of sports venues
- List of sports venues by capacity
- List of sporting venues with a highest attendance of 100,000 or more
- List of indoor arenas
- List of stadiums by capacity
- Multi-purpose stadium
- Pitch (sports field)
- Sports complex
