= Rauan Isaliyev =

Kazakhstani bandy player

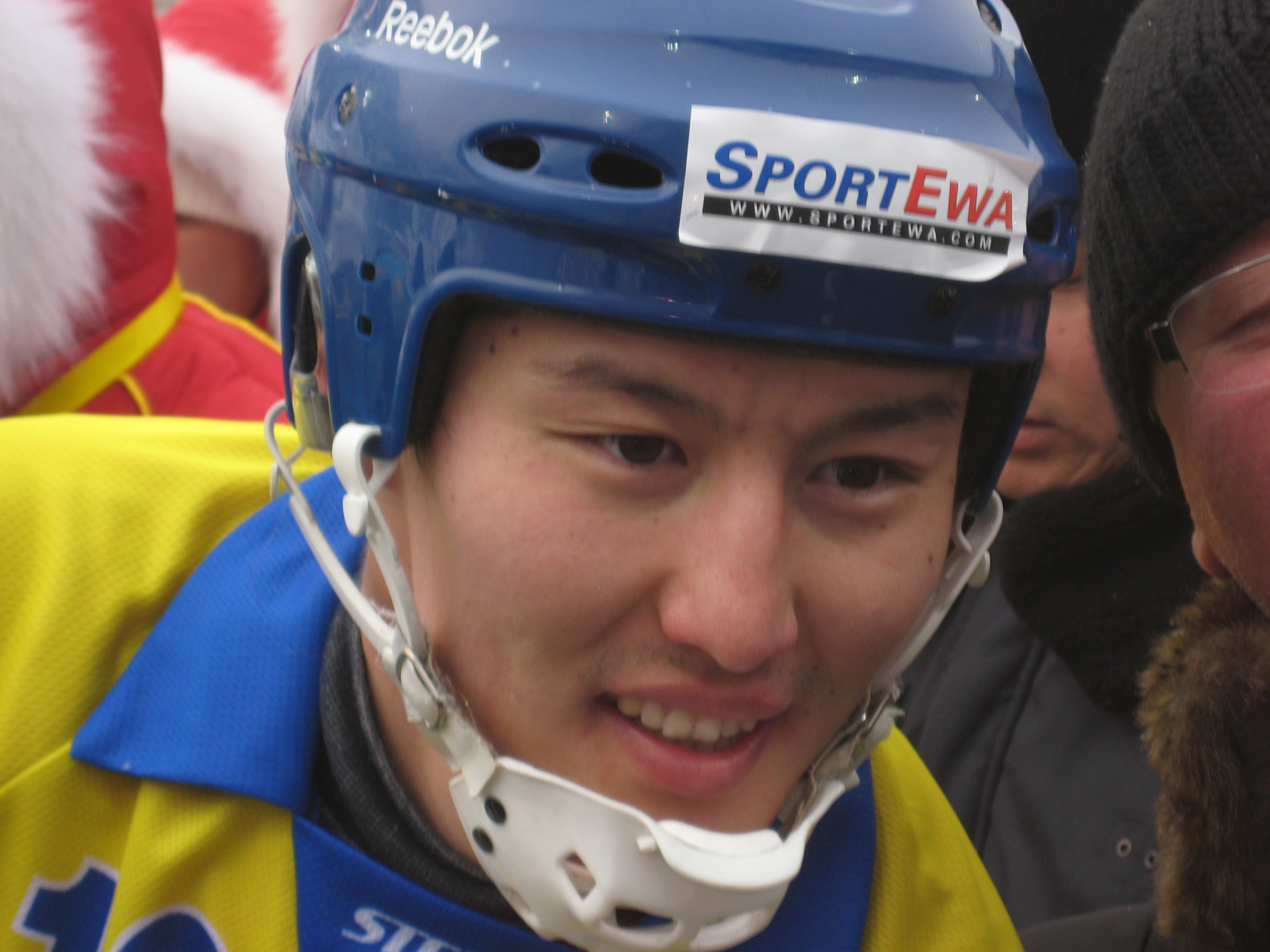

Personal information
- Full name: Rauan Orynbasarovich Isaliyev
- Born: 13 May 1988 (age 38) Oral, Kazakhstan
- Height: 180 cm (5.9 ft)
- Playing position: Midfielder

Club information
- Current team: Sibselmash
- Number: 80

Senior career*
Years	Team	Apps^{†}	(Gls)^{†}
2002–2008	Akzhaiyk		
2008–2010	Vodnik	30	(8)
2010–2012	Start	48	(39)
2012–	Sibselmash	138	(84)

National team
2006–	Kazakhstan		
- * Senior club appearances and goals counted for the domestic league only. † Appearances (Goals).

Rauan Orynbasarovich Isaliyev (Kazakh: Рауан Орынбасарұлы Исалиев, romanized: Rauan Orynbasarūly Isalıev, Russian: Рауан Орынбасарович Исалиев, born 13 May 1988) is a Kazakh bandy player and captain of the national team. He currently plays as midfielder for Sibselmash from Novosibirsk in the Russian Bandy Super League.

== Biography ==
Isaliyev was born 13 May 1988 in Oral, West Kazakhstan Region, and started his bandy career in 2002 with Akzhayik Sports Club until 2008. He spent his next two seasons with Vodnik in Arkhangelsk, then two seasons with Start in Nizhny Novgorod.

With the national bandy team, Isaliyev has won bronze medals at the Bandy World Championship (2012, 2013, 2014, 2015). At the 2011 Asian Winter Games, he was top goalscorer in the bandy tournament, and Kazakhstan won the goal medal on home ice at the Medeu in Almaty. He was the flag bearer at the closing ceremony.

After the 2012–13 league season he was elected best player in Start. Following the 2018–19 season he achieved that feat with Sibselmash for the third year in a row.

At the 2018 World Championship he was the topscorer in Division A.

== Soccer ==
Rauan Isaliyev
Personal information
- Full name: Rauan Orynbasarovich Isaliyev
- Date of birth: 13 May 1988 (age 38)
- Place of birth: Oral, Kazakhstan
- Position: Defensive midfielder

Team information
- Current team: FC Jelaev Nan
- Number: 10

Senior career*
Years	Team	Apps	(Gls)
2026–	FC Jelaev Nan		
- * Club domestic league appearances and goals as of 6 June 2026

On April 9, 2026, as a professional footballer, he played as a defensive midfielder in the Kazakhstan Cup match for Jelaev Nan FK against Altay (0:2).
