= Bandy Federation of Kyrgyzstan =

Bandy Federation of Kyrgyzstan was the governing body for bandy in Kyrgyzstan. Its headquarters was in Bishkek. The Bandy Federation of Kyrgyzstan became a member of Federation of International Bandy in 2004. In 2018 the organisation was removed from the FIB members' list.

The Kyrgyzstan national bandy team won the bronze medal at the 2011 Asian Winter Games. The team also participated at the 2012 Bandy World Championship.

== National team ==
- Kyrgyzstan
