= Japan national bandy team =

Japan
- Association: Japan Bandy Federation
- Head coach: (Japan) Takamura Hiromasa
- Team colors

First international
- Japan 2–6 Estonia (Almaty, Kazakhstan; 31 January 2012)

Biggest win
- Kyrgyzstan 0–13 Japan (Almaty, Kazakhstan; 1 February 2012)

Biggest defeat
- Estonia 12–1 Japan (Vänersborg, 24 January 2019)

Bandy World Championship
- Appearances: 8 (first in 2012)
- Best result: 10th (2018)

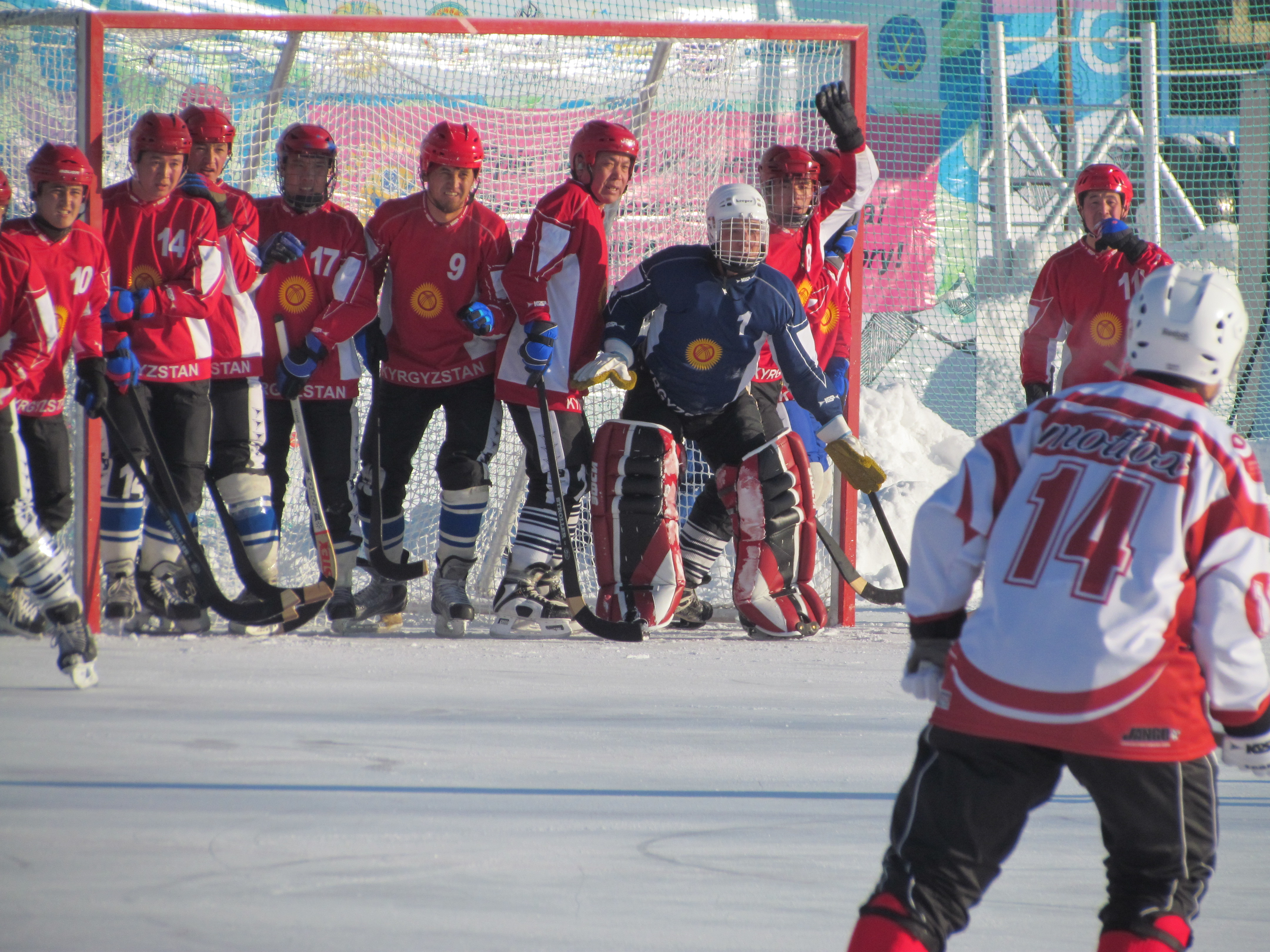
Japan playing Kyrgyzstan at the 2012 world championship.

Japan national bandy team is competing for Japan in the international bandy tournaments. Japan Bandy Federation was established in April 2011 and the national team made its world championship debut in 2012. After having competed every time since then, at the 2023 World Championship the team will not participate.

== Tournament participation ==
=== World Championships ===
- 2012 – 13th place (2nd in Group C)
- 2013 – 13th place (7th in Division B)
- 2014 – 12th place (4th in Division B)
- 2015 – 13th place (6th in Division B)
- 2016 – 13th place (5th in Division B)
- 2017 – 12th place (4th in Division B)
- 2018 – 10th place (2nd in Division B)
- 2019 – 12th place (4th in Division B)
