= China Bandy Federation =

Governing body for bandy in China

- Formation: 2014; 12 years ago
- Type: Governing body
- Purpose: Governing body for the sport of bandy
- Location: Haidan District, Beijing, China
- Region served: China (PR)
- Members: Federation of International Bandy (2014)
- Chairman: Shouting Zhang
- Website: http://www.chinabandy.org/

China Bandy Federation, CBF, was founded on 13 December 2014. The Chinese Ice Hockey Association joined the Federation of International Bandy (FIB) in 2010 and governed bandy in China until it was replaced by the CBF.

The federation was founded at the initiative and cooperation of China Sustainable Society, Nordic Sustainable Organization, Nordic Vikings, Hokay, Harbin Sport University, Chengde City and Beijing International. The Federation is looking to set up teams in Chengde, Harbin, Changchun, Qiqihar, Jiamusi, Fuyuan (close to the Russian border and Khabarovsk, where there's a professional Russian bandy club) as well as Beijing. China Bandy is mainly financed by private resources. The City of Chengde, the Federation of International Bandy and some Russian and Swedish companies has helped starting up the organisation.

The offices of the Federation is located at No.8, Yuyuantan South Road in Haidian District in the Chinese capital Beijing. The general manager is Per-Erik Holmström and the deputy general manager is Rex Long Wang. The Federation is governing the China men's national bandy team, the China women's national bandy team and domestic games.

China was the host nation of the 2018 Women's Bandy World Championship in the city of Chengde and the B Division of the 2018 Men's Bandy World Championship in the city of Harbin.

== National teams ==
- China men's national bandy team
- China women's national bandy team
