= China national bandy team =

China
- Association: China Bandy Federation

First international
- China 2–3 Mongolia (Khabarovsk, Russia; 1 February 2015)

Biggest win
- China 11–1 Somalia (Khabarovsk, Russia; 5 February 2015)

Biggest defeat
- China 0–14 Latvia (Trollhättan, Sweden; 23 January 2019)

Bandy World Championship
- Appearances: 5 (first in 2015)
- Best result: 12th (2018)

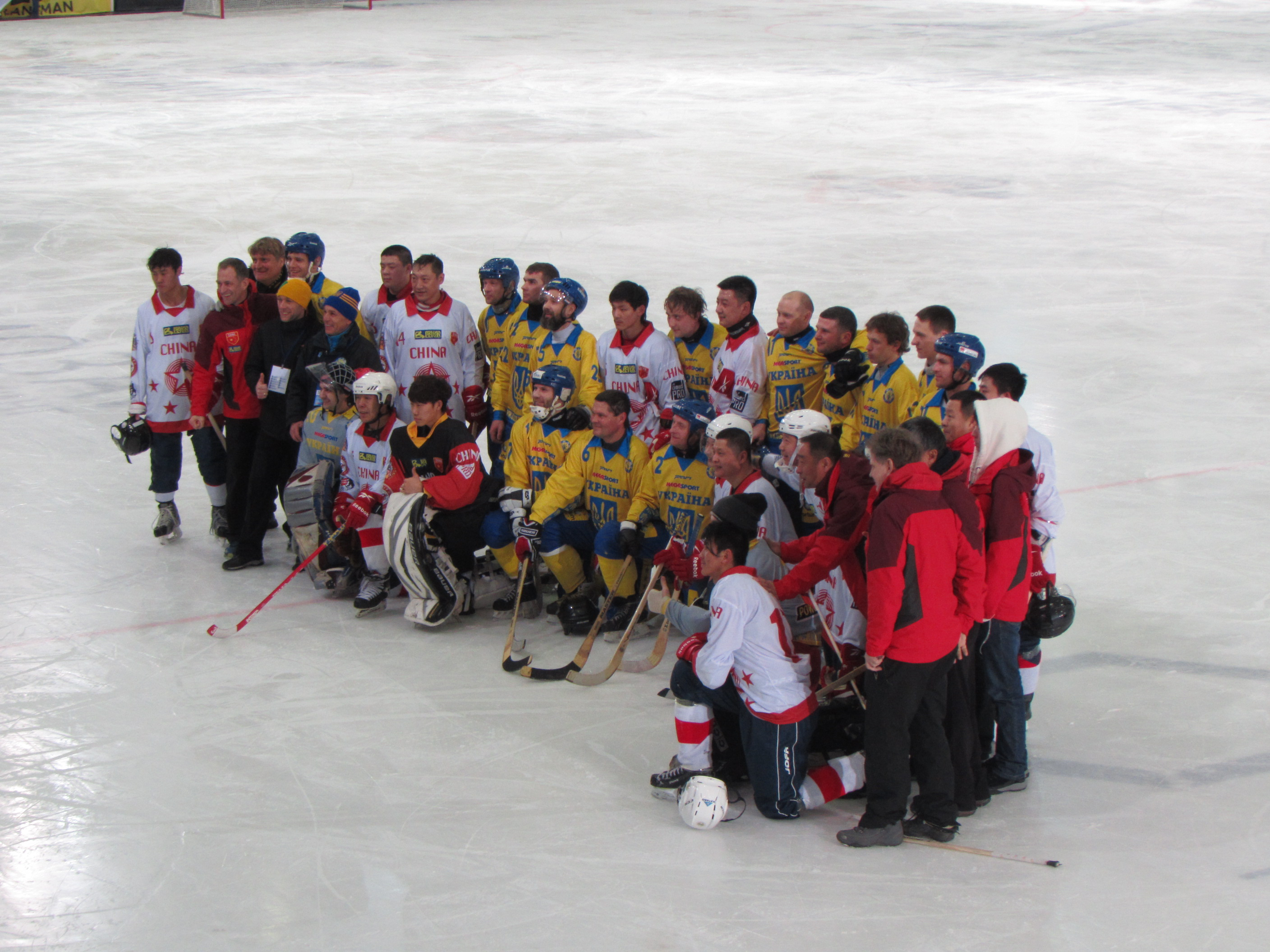
China and Ukraine in the 2016 World Championship

China national bandy team represents the People's Republic of China in international bandy and is governed by the China Bandy Federation. It made its World Championship debut in the 2015 Bandy World Championship, where they ended up in eighth place among nine teams in Group B. It played in the tournaments 2016, 2017 and 2018 as well. 2018 its Division, B, was played at home, in Harbin.

== Tournament participation ==
=== World Championships ===
Year	Rank	GP	W	D	L	GS	GA	GD
(Finland) 1957 to (Russia) 2014	Did not enter							
(Russia) 2015	16th (8th in Division B)	7	2	0	5	31	41	-10
(Russia) 2016	16th (8th in Division B)	8	2	0	6	35	46	-11
(Sweden) 2017	17th (9th in Division B)	7	2	0	5	26	44	-18
(China) 2018	12th (4th in Division B)	6	3	0	3	15	24	-9
(Sweden) 2019	18th (10th in Division B)	6	1	0	5	8	48	-40
(Russia) 2020	Did not enter							
Total	5/39	34	10	0	24	115	203	-88
