= Bandy Federation of Mongolia =

Sports organization of Mongolia

Bandy Federation of Mongolia is the governing body for bandy in Mongolia. Its headquarters is in Bayangol district. Bandy Federation of Mongolia became a member of Federation of International Bandy in 2002.

== National team ==
- Mongolia
