= Latvia's Bandy Federation =

Sports governing body in Latvia

Latvia's Bandy Federation (Latvian: Latvijas Bendija Federācija) is the governing body for bandy and rink bandy in Latvia. Its headquarters is in Mārupe. Latvia's Bandy Federation was founded in 2006 and became a member in Federation of International Bandy the same year.

== National team ==
- Latvia
