= ABB Arena =

Two biggest indoor arenas in Västerås, Sweden

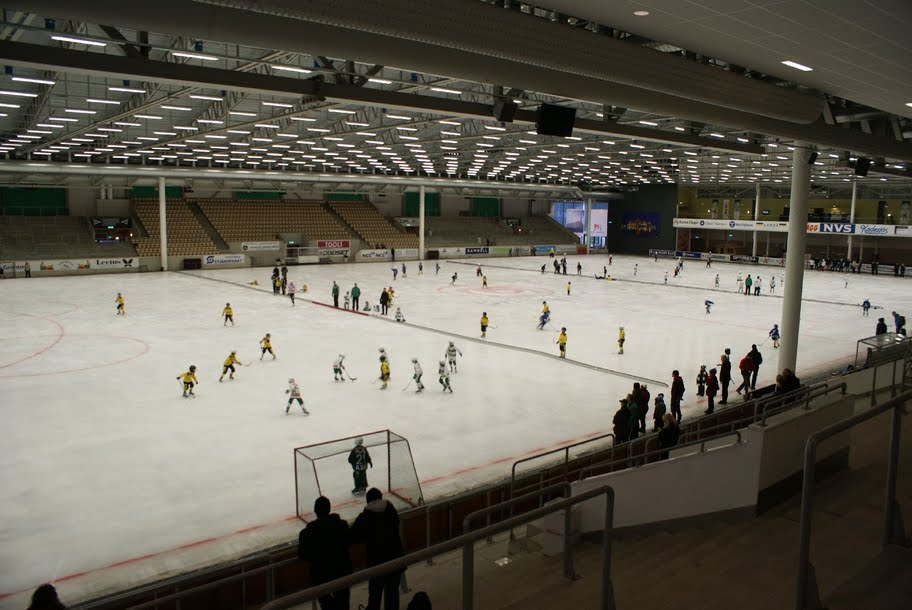
- ABB Arena Syd in September 2009
- Interactive map of ABB Arena
- Former names: Rocklundahallen (1965–2006)
- Location: Västerås, Sweden
- Coordinates: 59°37′35″N 16°31′43″E
- Owner: Rocklunda Sport och Event AB
- Capacity: 4,902 (Nord); 9,000 (Syd)

Construction
- Opened: 13 October 2007
- Architect: Sweco

Tenants
- Västerås SK Bandy; Tillberga IK Bandy; Västerås IK; VIK Västerås Hockey Klubb Ungdom; IFK Västerås Konståkningsklubb

ABB Arena is the common name for the two biggest indoor arenas in Västerås, Sweden.

== Venues ==
=== Arena Nord ===
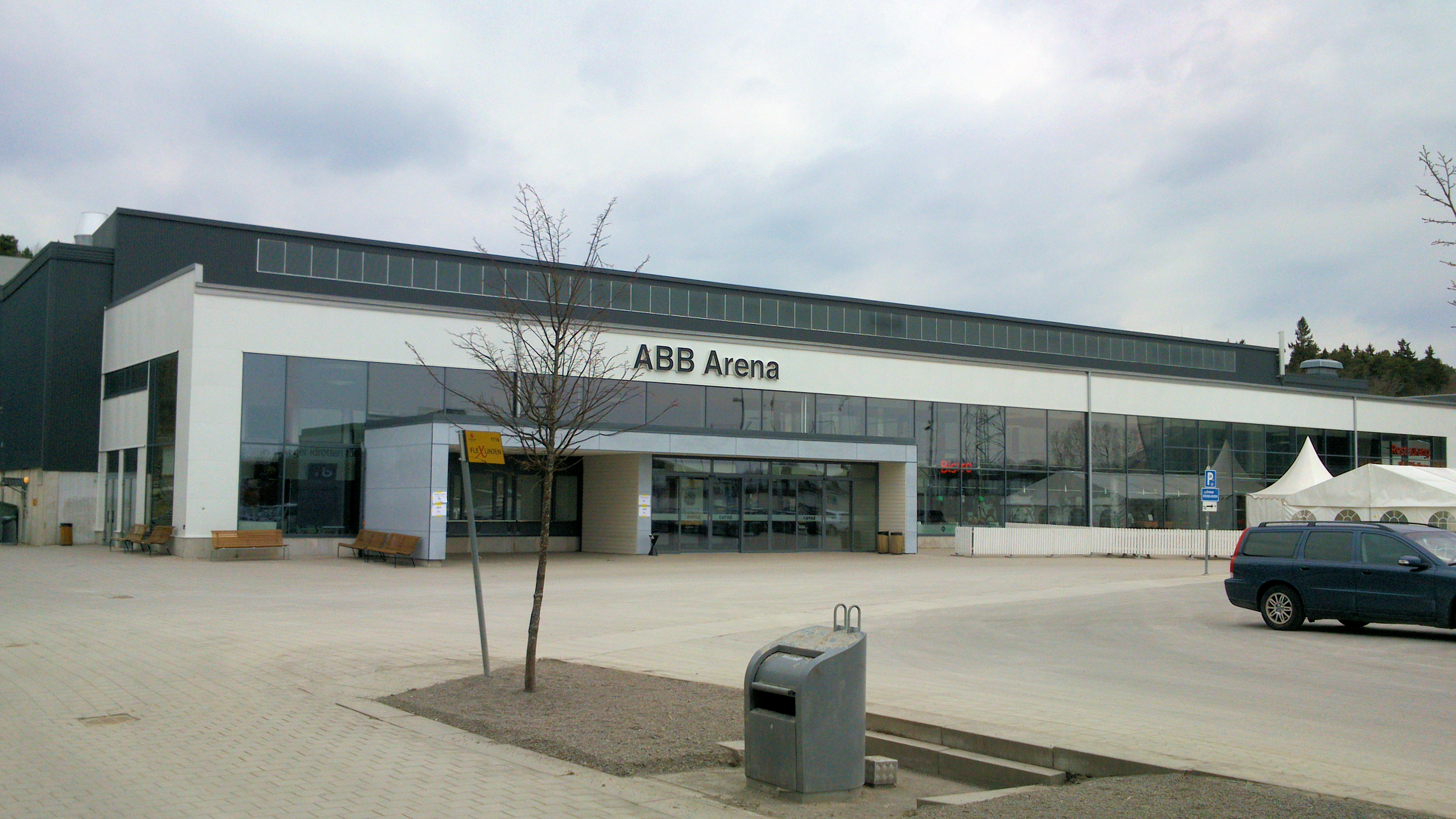
ABB Arena Nord in May 2013

ABB Arena Nord is the ice hockey arena and VIK Västerås HK's home arena. It was renovated in September 2007 and has a capacity of 4,902 spectators. "ABB Arena Nord" is the renovated arena, which was earlier called Rocklundahallen.

=== Arena Syd ===
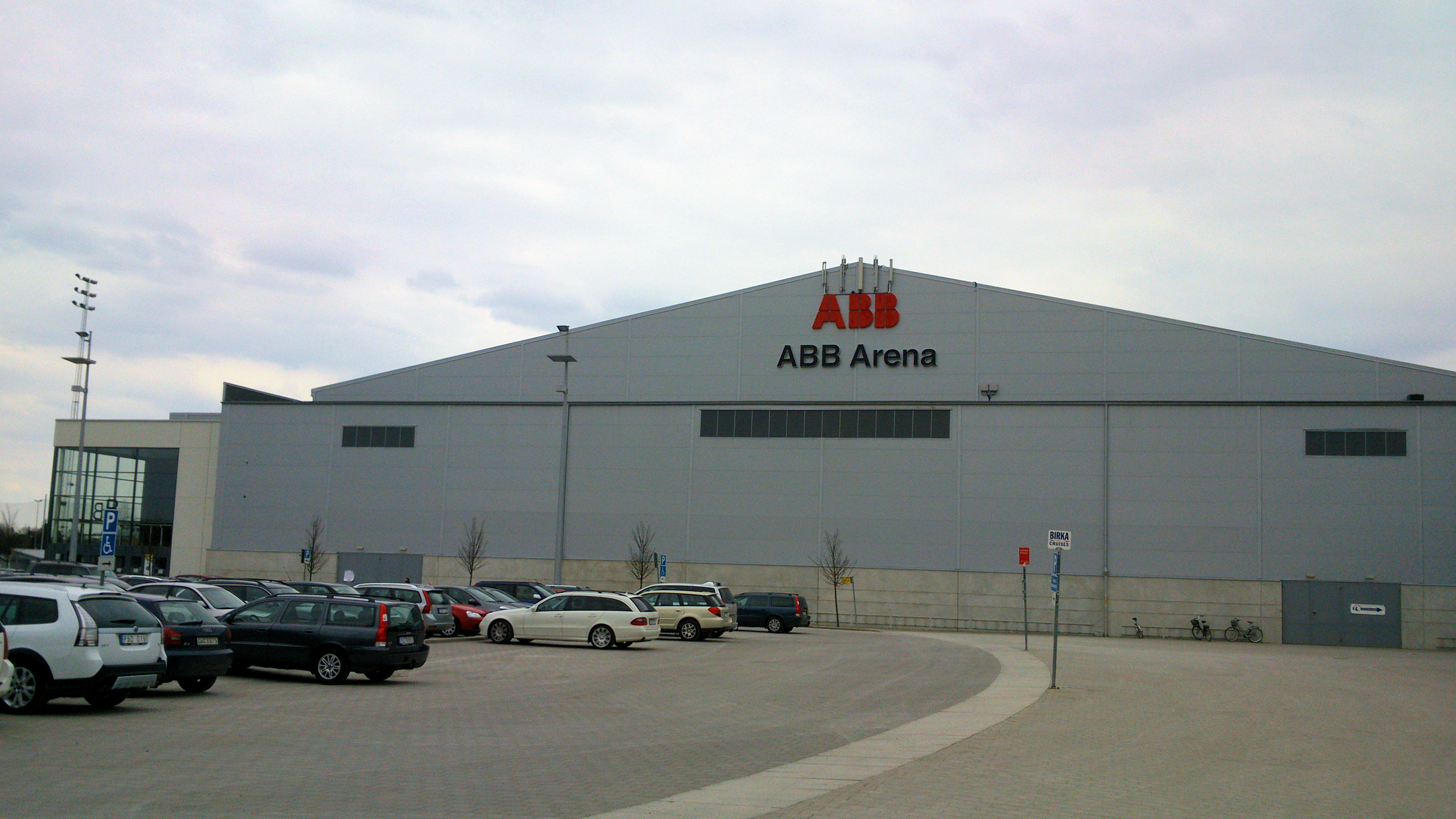
ABB Arena Syd in May 2013

"ABB Arena Syd" is the second arena and is a multi-purpose arena mainly used for bandy, but also for concerts and exhibitions.

ABB Arena Syd is the biggest permanent indoor arena for bandy in Sweden (Friends Arena and Tele2 Arena, where a few Swedish Championship finals have been played, are bigger, but they are not usually used for bandy).

ABB Arena Syd is the home arena for Västerås SK Bandy and has a capacity of 9,000 spectators at bandy matches.

It was the main arena at the Bandy World Championship 2009. The Federation of International Bandy (FIB) have arranged training camps for developing bandy countries here.

== See also ==
- List of indoor arenas in Sweden
- List of indoor arenas in Nordic countries

Events and tenants
Preceded by Olympic Stadium; Moscow	Bandy World Championship; Final Venue; 2009	Succeeded by Ice Palace Krylatskoye; Moscow
