= Kyrgyzstan national bandy team =

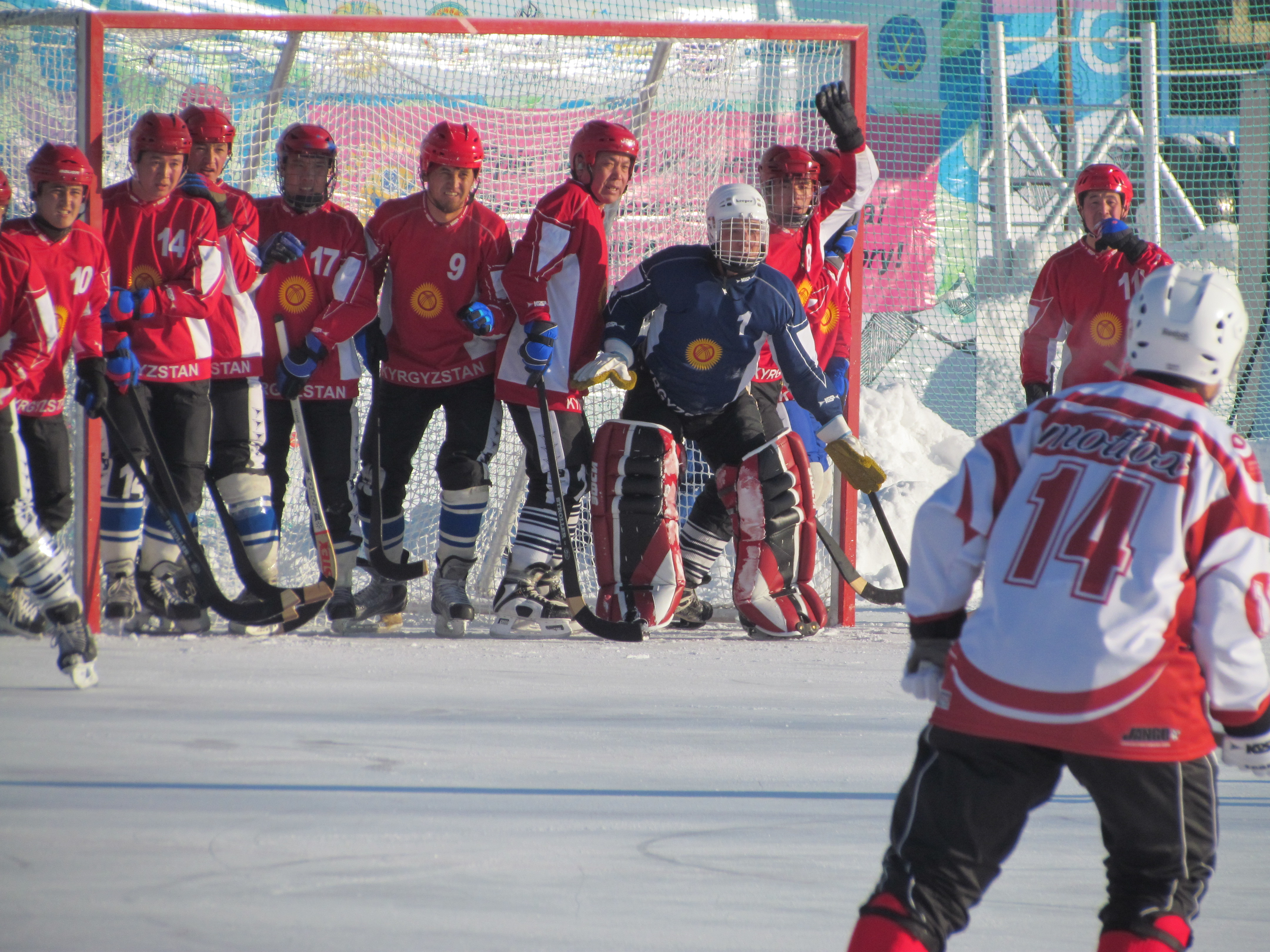
Against Japan at the 2012 Bandy World Championship.

The Kyrgyz national bandy team won the bronze medal at the 2011 Asian Winter Games, the country's first medal of any sport in those games.

The team also participated at the 2012 Bandy World Championship. They have yet (2021) to make another World Championship appearance.

Kyrgyzstan planned to participate in the first Asian Championship, a tournament which was to be held in 2016 but in the end did not take place.

The Bandy Federation of Kyrgyzstan is since 2018 no longer a member of the Federation of International Bandy.
