= 2018 Bandy World Championship =

XXXVIIIth Bandy World Championship

Tournament details
- Host countries: China; Russia
- Venue(s): 2 (in 2 host cities)
- Dates: 28 January – 4 February
- Teams: 8 (Division A) and 8 (Division B)

Final positions
- Champions: Russia (11th title)
- Runner-up: Sweden
- Third place: Finland
- Fourth place: Kazakhstan

Tournament statistics
- Games played: 22 (Division A); 22 (Division B)
- Scoring leader(s): Division A (Kazakhstan) Rauan Isaliyev (21 goals); Division B (Estonia) Aleksei Ibatulov (18 goals)

Awards
- MVP: (Sweden) Daniel Berlin

The 2018 Bandy World Championship was the 38th Bandy World Championship between men's bandy teams. The tournament took place in China and Russia. Division A matches were played in the Russian city of Khabarovsk and Division B matches in Harbin, Heilongjiang, China.

== Participating teams and officials ==
Logo of the B Division, which was played in Harbin, China.

Eight nations were qualified for the Division A, where the matches were played in Khabarovsk, Russia. Canada would have made its return to Division A, as it won in the Division B last year, but declined to participate and was replaced by Hungary. The other teams in Division A were directly qualified through their results in the same division last year.

The Division B matches were played in Harbin, Manchuria, and made up of eight teams. Of the countries from 2017, Belarus, which finished in last place of Division A, and the Czech Republic, chose not to participate.

=== Division A ===
==== Pool A ====
- Finland
- Norway
- Russia
- Sweden

==== Pool B ====
- Germany
- Hungary
- Kazakhstan
- United States

=== Division B ===
==== Pool A ====
- Estonia
- Japan
- Mongolia
- Ukraine

==== Pool B ====
- China
- Netherlands
- Slovakia
- Somalia

=== Officials ===
	Referees	Assistants
Division A	(Finland) Petri Kuusela; (Norway) Pontus Petersson; (Russia) Nikita Yuklyaevskikh; (Sweden) Jonas Kandell; (United States) Eric William Hemmesch	(Finland) Mika Mutanen; (Finland) Harri Pietilaintn; (Norway) Fredrik Bjørseth; (Russia) Sergey Beskonchin; (Russia) Denis Pronin; (Sweden) Per Jacobsson; (Sweden) Thomas Persson
Division B	(Canada) Brenden Burnell; (Czech Republic) Radek Kopal; (Kazakhstan) Andrey Piunov; (Russia) Egor Lukyanchenko; (Russia) Rodion Yarovenko; (Sweden) Adam Jokinen	(China) Sang Hong; (China) Wang Xue Feng; (Germany) Dmitri Antropov; (Japan) Ryuji Tsujitsugu; (Kazakhstan) Nurlan Urazgaliev; (Netherlands) Bas van Meijel; (Sweden) Jimmy Elwing; (United States) Steven Shinn

== Venues ==
Khabarovsk	Harbin
Arena Yerofey	Harbin Sport University Stadium
Capacity: 10,000	Capacity: 5,000

== Division A ==
=== Preliminary round ===
All times are local (UTC+10).

==== Group A ====
Pos	Team	Pld	W	D	L	GF	GA	GD	Pts
1	Sweden	3	3	0	0	32	4	+28	6
2	Russia (H)	3	2	0	1	20	8	+12	4
3	Finland	3	1	0	2	9	11	−2	2
4	Norway	3	0	0	3	1	39	−38	0

(H) Hosts
Game 3
29 January 2018
16:00

Sweden	9–1	Finland
Berlin 4', 33'; Löfstedt 9'; Fagerström 19', 82'; Johansson 28'; Westh 68'; E. Pettersson 78' (p), 81'	Report	53' Tu. Määttä

Arena Yerofey, Khabarovsk
Attendance: 2,605
Referee: Nikita Yuklyaevskikh (Russia)
Game 4
29 January 2018
19:30

Russia	15–1	Norway
A. Prokopiev 3'; Ishkeldin 15', 74'; Dergaev 16', 75', 82'; Lomanov 20', 53', 63', 65'; Mirgazov 21', 71'; Dzhusoev 36'; Kalanchin 85'; Bondarenko 87'	Report	79' Kristoffersen

Arena Yerofey, Khabarovsk
Attendance: 9,432
Referee: Petri Kuusela (Finland)
Game 7
30 January 2018
16:00

Sweden	17–0	Norway
Löfstedt 4', 16', 34', 46', 59'; J. Andersson 16'; E. Pettersson 33', 45' (p), 66'; Säfström 50', 82'; Eriksson 63'; Jansson 68', 73', 86'; Fagerström 71'; H. Andersson 88'	Report

Arena Yerofey, Khabarovsk
Attendance: 1,262
Referee: Petri Kuusela (Finland)
Game 8
30 January 2018
19:30

Russia	2–1	Finland
Ishkeldin 31'; Mirgazov 66'	Report	25' (p) J. Liukkonen

Arena Yerofey, Khabarovsk
Attendance: 4,321
Referee: Jonas Kandell (Sweden)
Game 11
31 January 2018
16:00

Norway	0–7	Finland
	Report	17', 33' (p), 68' Kumpuoja; 22' Helavuori; 48' (p) Nissinen; 52', 89' Te. Määttä

Arena Yerofey, Khabarovsk
Attendance: 737
Referee: Nikita Yuklyaevskikh (Russia)
Game 12
31 January 2018
19:30

Sweden	6–3	Russia
Berlin 5'; J. Andersson 10', 53'; Johansson 60'; Fagerström 63', 69'	Report	29' Dzhusoev; 48' Ishkeldin; 87' Befus

Arena Yerofey, Khabarovsk
Attendance: 7,520
Referee: Petri Kuusela (Finland)

==== Group B ====
Pos	Team	Pld	W	D	L	GF	GA	GD	Pts
1	Kazakhstan	3	3	0	0	60	3	+57	6
2	United States	3	2	0	1	31	19	+12	4
3	Germany	3	1	0	2	15	36	−21	2
4	Hungary	3	0	0	3	6	54	−48	0

Game 1
29 January 2018
10:00

United States	14–4	Germany
Brown 1', 19', 24', 85', 90'; Lickteig 18', 28', 42'; Wenzel 38'; Richardson 48'; Carman 52'; Dwyer 56'; Erickson 57'; Williams 72'	Report	16' Völker; 23', 58', 65' Kolyagin

Arena Yerofey, Khabarovsk
Attendance: 520
Referee: Jonas Kandell (Sweden)
Game 2
29 January 2018
13:00

Hungary	0–29	Kazakhstan
	Report	2', 9', 18', 22', 24', 40', 50', 72' Isaliyev; 4' Zhaukenov; 8', 23', 60', 90' Chernyshev; 13' Nugmanov; 14', 27' Vshivkov; 25', 27', 34', 51', 64' Leonov; 29' Riazanov; 37', 49', 82' Khrapenkov; 44' (p) Kadirzhanov; 55' Utebaliev; 58', 74' Zavidovskiy

Arena Yerofey, Khabarovsk
Attendance: 495
Referee: Eric William Hemmesch (USA)
Game 6
30 January 2018
13:00

Kazakhstan	14–1	United States
Isaliyev 1', 14' (p), 31', 65' (p); Vshivkov 37', 78'; Chernyshev 39', 41', 42'; Leonov 52', 61'; Nugmanov 68'; Galyautdinov 77'; Utebaliev 79'	Report	34' Brown

Arena Yerofey, Khabarovsk
Attendance: 538
Referee: Nikita Yuklyaevskikh (Russia)
Game 9
31 January 2018
10:00

Germany	2–17	Kazakhstan
Kolyagin 17'; Kuznetsov 57'	Report	3' Vshivkov; 5', 33', 48', 49' Isaliyev; 24', 37', 83' Chernyshev; 26' Kadirzhanov; 29', 32' Utebaliev; 35' Zhaukenov; 39', 61' Leonov; 41' Nugmanov; 55' Riazanov; 66' Galyautdinov

Arena Yerofey, Khabarovsk
Attendance: 567
Referee: Pontus Petersson (Norway)
Game 10
31 January 2018
13:00

United States	16–1	Hungary
Brown 1', 6', 31', 38', 39'; Zitouni 4', 13'; Erickson 18', 80'; Carman 20'; Blucher 35'; Williams 42'; Knutson 44'; Wenzel 65'; Lickteig 85', 87'	Report	59' Kordisz

Arena Yerofey, Khabarovsk
Attendance: 376
Referee: Jonas Kandell (Sweden)
Game 5
1 February 2018
09:00

Germany	9–5	Hungary
Dunaev 9', 42'; Völker 13', 51'; Kolyagin 22', 40'; Kail 63'; Kusmin 67'; Houck 69'	Report	18' Frajka; 31' Pacsai; 37', 82' Schellin; 47' Polgar

Arena Yerofey, Khabarovsk
Attendance: 138
Referee: Pontus Petersson (Norway)

=== Play-off ===
==== Bracket ====
Quarter-finals
2 February
Russia	26
Germany	1
2 February
Finland	13
United States	4
2 February
Sweden	16
Hungary	3
2 February
Norway	1
Kazakhstan	6

Semi-finals
3 February
Russia	8
Finland	2
3 February
Sweden	5
Kazakhstan	4

Final
4 February
Russia	5
Sweden	4
Third place
4 February
Finland	8
Kazakhstan	4

==== Quarterfinals ====
Game 13
2 February 2018
10:00

Norway	1–6	Kazakhstan
Jensen 25'	Report	7', 89' (p) Vshivkov; 15' Riazanov; 44', 78', 79' Isaliyev

Arena Yerofey, Khabarovsk
Attendance: 234
Referee: Nikita Yuklyaevskikh (Russia)
Game 14
2 February 2018
13:00

Finland	13–4	United States
Kumpuoja 1', 17', 65', 67', 83' (p); Lukkarila 4', 6', 65'; Heinonen 5', 44'; Peuhkuri 11'; Tu. Määttä 51' (p); Te. Määttä 86'	Report	56' Erickson; 59' (p) Richardson; 66' Carman; 89' Knutson

Arena Yerofey, Khabarovsk
Attendance: 487
Referee: Pontus Petersson (Norway)
Game 15
2 February 2018
16:00

Sweden	16–3	Hungary
Edlund 3', 44'; Gilljam 15', 75'; Fagerström 18', 32', 69'; Jansson 28', 70', 80'; Pizzoni Elfving 39'; Löfstedt 53', 71'; H. Andersson 56'; Säfström 58'; J. Andersson 84'	Report	79' Jankovics; 83', 86' Kordisz

Arena Yerofey, Khabarovsk
Attendance: 738
Referee: Jonas Kandell (Sweden)
Game 16
2 February 2018
19:30

Russia	26–1	Germany
Lomanov 12', 34', 40'; Bondarenko 13', 24'; Dergaev 14', 21', 30' (p), 51'; Vikulin 16', 77'; Arkhipkin 19', 43', 73', 84'; Mirgazov 23', 35', 42', 63'; Befus 26', 53', 74'; A. Prokopiev 28'; Chernov 44', 82'; Granovskiy 58'	Report	48' Völker

Arena Yerofey, Khabarovsk
Attendance: 2,765
Referee: Petri Kuusela (Finland)

==== 7th place game ====
Game 17
3 February 2018
10:00

Germany	21–1	Hungary
Völker 3', 62'; Kolyagin 4', 23' (p), 31', 45', 71', 81'; Kail 5', 9', 20', 86'; Kudrin 7'; Kuznetsov 11', 69'; Dunaev 27', 33'; Kusmin 47'; Laue 61'; Houck 67'; Paul 80'	Report	59' Pacsai

Arena Yerofey, Khabarovsk
Attendance: 319
Referee: Pontus Petersson (Norway)

==== 5th place game ====
Game 18
3 February 2018
13:00

United States	3–2	Norway
Carman 43', 72'; Wenzel 56'	Report	37' Jerner; 58' Kristoffersen

Arena Yerofey, Khabarovsk
Attendance: 867
Referee: Petri Kuusela (Finland)

==== Semifinals ====
Game 19
3 February 2018
16:00

Russia	8–2	Finland
Lomanov 2'; Mirgazov 8', 53'; Ishkeldin 18'; Dergaev 22'; A. Prokopiev 40'; Chernov 52'; Bondarenko 74'	Report	29' J. Liukkonen; 90' Te. Määttä

Arena Yerofey, Khabarovsk
Attendance: 6,186
Referee: Jonas Kandell (Sweden)
Game 20
3 February 2018
19:30

Sweden	5–4	Kazakhstan
Edlund 3', 49' (p), 78'; Berlin 41'; Löfstedt 66'	Report	18', 32', 84' Vshivkov; 70' Galyautdinov

Arena Yerofey, Khabarovsk
Attendance: 2,274
Referee: Nikita Yuklyaevskikh (Russia)

==== Third place game ====
Game 21
4 February 2018
11:00

Finland	8–4	Kazakhstan
Kumpuoja 13', 20'; Lukkarila 35', 62'; J. Liukkonen 57' (p); Peuhkuri 75'; Tu. Määttä 76'; Moisala 90'	Report	15' Zavidovskiy; 54' Vshivkov; 60', 79' Isaliyev

Arena Yerofey, Khabarovsk
Attendance: 1,320
Referee: Jonas Kandell (Sweden)

==== Final ====
Game 22
4 February 2018
16:00

Russia	5–4	Sweden
Mirgazov 1', 5', 78'; Dzhusoev 26'; Ishkeldin 50'	Report	16' Hellmyrs; 46' Löfstedt; 61' Berlin; 64' Gilljam

Arena Yerofey, Khabarovsk
Attendance: 8,967
Referee: Petri Kuusela (Finland)

=== Final ranking ===
Gold medal	Russia
Silver medal	Sweden
Bronze medal	Finland
4	Kazakhstan
5	United States
6	Norway
7	Germany
8	Hungary ▼

== Division B ==
=== Preliminary round ===
All times are local (UTC+8).

==== Group A ====
Pos	Team	Pld	W	D	L	GF	GA	GD	Pts
1	Estonia	3	2	0	1	14	7	+7	4
2	Japan	3	1	1	1	8	8	0	3
3	Mongolia	3	1	1	1	6	5	+1	3
4	Ukraine	3	1	0	2	7	15	−8	2

Game 3
28 January 2018
13:00

Mongolia	1–1	Japan
Jargalsaikhan 10'	Report	47' Asano
Penalties
	2–3

Harbin Sport University Stadium, Harbin
Attendance: 500
Referee: (Czech Republic) Radek Kopal
Game 4
28 January 2018
15:30

Ukraine	2–8	Estonia
Levchenko 37', 47'	Report	6' (p), 14', 23' Kaup; 10', 57' Andreev; 33', 41' Ibatulov; 46' Volin

Harbin Sport University Stadium, Harbin
Attendance: 300
Referee: (Russia) Rodion Yarovenko
Game 7
29 January 2018
13:30

Ukraine	3–1	Mongolia
Levchenko 10'; Markovichenko 41'; Tsymbal 56'	Report	23' Tsogtoo

Harbin Sport University Stadium, Harbin
Attendance: 200
Referee: (Sweden) Adam Jokinen
Game 8
29 January 2018
15:30

Japan	1–5	Estonia
Aihara 17'	Report	16', 33' (p) Ibatulov; 23' Andreev; 58' Kabatchikov; 59' Kaup

Harbin Sport University Stadium, Harbin
Attendance: 200
Referee: (Kazakhstan) Andrey Piunov
Game 11
30 January 2018
13:00

Ukraine	2–6	Japan
Levchenko 35'; Tsymbal 45'	Report	39' (p), 43' (p), 45' Aihara; 34' Asano; 51' Yamanouchi; 52' Ishioka

Harbin Sport University Stadium, Harbin
Attendance: 200
Referee: (Kazakhstan) Andrey Piunov
Game 12
30 January 2018
15:30

Estonia	1–4	Mongolia
Pankov 60'	Report	7', 25' Tsogtoo; 22', 45' Jargalsaikhan

Harbin Sport University Stadium, Harbin
Attendance: 300
Referee: (Czech Republic) Radek Kopal

==== Group B ====
Pos	Team	Pld	W	D	L	GF	GA	GD	Pts
1	Netherlands	3	3	0	0	23	1	+22	6
2	China (H)	3	2	0	1	8	9	−1	4
3	Slovakia	3	1	0	2	10	10	0	2
4	Somalia	3	0	0	3	0	21	−21	0

(H) Hosts
Game 5
28 January 2018
11:30

China	1–7	Netherlands
Wu H. 55'	Report	12', 23' Den Brok; 16', 59' (p) S.Tveitan; 32', 45', 57' Cras

Harbin Sport University Stadium, Harbin
Attendance: 650
Referee: (Kazakhstan) Andrey Piunov
Game 2
29 January 2018
10:00

China	4–0	Somalia
Yu 1'; Lu 11', 28'; Nan 15'	Report

Harbin Sport University Stadium, Harbin
Attendance: 500
Referee: (Czech Republic) Radek Kopal
Game 1
29 January 2018
11:30

Netherlands	7–0	Slovakia
De Bie 9'; Cras 23', 43', 53' (p); Den Brok 25'; Hengst 46'; Speijers 57'	Report

Harbin Sport University Stadium, Harbin
Attendance: 300
Referee: (Russia) Rodion Yarovenko
Game 9
30 January 2018
10:00

Slovakia	2–3	China
Blišťan 6'; Nezník 31'	Report	2' Wu H. 12' Yu; 25' Nan

Harbin Sport University Stadium, Harbin
Attendance: 600
Referee: (Russia) Rodion Yarovenko
Game 10
30 January 2018
11:30

Netherlands	9–0	Somalia
S.Tveitan 18' (p), 26', 47'; Cras 20' (p), 41', 42'; B. Tveitan 24'; Hengst 34', 39'	Report

Harbin Sport University Stadium, Harbin
Attendance: 200
Referee: (Sweden) Adam Jokinen
Game 6
30 January 2018
18:00

Slovakia	8–0	Somalia
Beneš 7', 28'; Blišťan 12', 45', 50'; Krídl 13'; Michalovič 19'; Rusnák 34'	Report

Harbin Sport University Stadium, Harbin
Attendance: 150
Referee: (Sweden) Adam Jokinen

=== Play-off ===
==== Bracket ====
Quarter-finals
31 January
Mongolia	2
China	3
31 January
Japan	4
Slovakia	1
31 January
Ukraine	1
Netherlands	4
31 January
Estonia	20
Somalia	0

Semi-finals
2 February
China	1
Japan	2
2 February
Netherlands	8
Estonia	4

Final
3 February
Japan	2
Netherlands	3
Third place
3 February
China	3
Estonia	11

==== Quarterfinals ====
Game 13
31 January 2018
09:00

Ukraine	1–4	Netherlands
Markovichenko 44' (p)	Report	35', 45' Den Brok; 51' (p) Cras; 65' Speijers

Harbin Sport University Stadium, Harbin
Attendance: 150
Referee: (Canada) Brenden Burnell
Game 14
31 January 2018
11:30

Mongolia	2–3	China
Davaadorzh 21'; Ganbold 80'	Report	40' Yu; 60', 62' Nan

Harbin Sport University Stadium, Harbin
Attendance: 300
Referee: (Kazakhstan) Andrey Piunov
Game 15
31 January 2018
14:00

Japan	4–1	Slovakia
Kobayashi 27'; Yamanouchi 52'; Aihara 60', 72' (p)	Report	57' Blišťan

Harbin Sport University Stadium, Harbin
Attendance: 300
Referee: (Sweden) Adam Jokinen
Game 16
31 January 2018
16:30

Estonia	20–0	Somalia
Jürisson 12', 72'; Kaup 16', 22', 34', 61', 86'; Ibatulov 18' (p), 20', 39', 41', 65', 68', 70', 85', 89'; Andreev 23'; Baranin 27'; Kaidash 77'; Kabatchikov 79'	Report

Harbin Sport University Stadium, Harbin
Attendance: 250
Referee: (Russia) Rodion Yarovenko

==== 7th place game ====
Game 17
2 February 2018
09:00

Somalia	0–2	Slovakia
	Report	23' Blišťan; 44' Štofik

Harbin Sport University Stadium, Harbin
Attendance: 150
Referee: (Kazakhstan) Andrey Piunov

==== 5th place game ====
Game 18
2 February 2018
11:30

Mongolia	3–2 (OT)	Ukraine
Ganbold 42'; Jargalsaikhan 52'; Gerelt 64'	Report	1' Shvedchenko; 38' Badamshyn

Harbin Sport University Stadium, Harbin
Attendance: 250
Referee: (Russia) Egor Lukyanchenko

==== Semifinals ====
Game 19
2 February 2018
14:00

China	1–2	Japan
Wu H. 27'	Report	56' Otani; 85' Asano

Harbin Sport University Stadium, Harbin
Attendance: 850
Referee: (Russia) Rodion Yarovenko
Game 20
2 February 2018
16:30

Netherlands	8–4	Estonia
Cras 38', 47', 60', 68', 78'; Speijers 64', 70'; Geenen 82'	Report	16' Ibatulov; 24', 37' Kaup; 29' (p) Andreev

Harbin Sport University Stadium, Harbin
Attendance: 150
Referee: (Czech Republic) Radek Kopal

==== Third place game ====
Game 21
3 February 2018
11:00

China	3–11	Estonia
Lu 10', 80'; Zhang Z. 74'	Report	7', 19', 51', 82' Kaup; 22' (p), 23', 60', 84' Ibatulov; 59' Andreev; 65' Pankov; 68' Baranin

Harbin Sport University Stadium, Harbin
Attendance: 300
Referee: (Russia) Rodion Yarovenko

==== Final ====
Game 22
3 February 2018
14:00

Japan	2–3	Netherlands
Nakai 46', 62'	Report	23', 48' Cras; 44' Speijers

Harbin Sport University Stadium, Harbin
Attendance: 600
Referee: (Sweden) Adam Jokinen

=== Final ranking ===
1	Netherlands ▲
2	Japan
3	Estonia
4	China
5	Mongolia
6	Ukraine
7	Slovakia
8	Somalia
