= Arena Yerofey =

Bandy arena in Khabarovsk, Russia

- Logo of the Arena

- Yerofey Arena's front entrance
- Interactive map of Arena Yerofey
- Full name: Regional Bandy Palace Arena "Yerofey"
- Address: Morozov Pavel Leontiyevich street, 83
- Location: Khabarovsk, Russia
- Coordinates: 48.4319°N 135.1000°E
- Owner: Government of Khabarovsk Krai
- Operator: KGAU DO SSHOR
- Capacity: 10,000
- Record attendance: 10,000 (2015 Bandy World Championship final)
- Public transit: Ulitsa Flegontova (Bus)
- Parking: ~400

Construction
- Opened: 2013

Tenant
- SKA-Neftyanik

Website
- https://erofey-arena.ru/

Arena Yerofey (Russian: Арена Ерофей), officially known as Regional Bandy Palace Arena "Yerofey" (Russian: Краевой дворец Хоккея с мячом Арена "Ерофей") is a bandy arena in Khabarovsk, Russia, which hosted the 2015 Bandy World Championship. The 2018 Bandy World Championship was also hosted there, but only Division A that time around. The arena was built in 2013, is 46,000 m^{2} and can seat 10,000 spectators. It is named after Yerofey Khabarov, the city's eponym.

The arena is the home ice for bandy club SKA-Neftyanik, which plays in the Super League and was its champion in 2017. The arena also holds concerts and open ice skating events. It also has a climbing wall and table tennis equipment.

In the late 2010s and early 2020s, the arena began getting upgrades. Around 2022, with the popularity of bandy in Khabarovsk on the rise, the arena got a mid-game announcer that would motivate SKA-Neftyanik supporters during events like corners or penalties. The arena also got a screen hanging from the roof over the middle of the pitch in around 2024.

Around the beginning of the Special Military Operation, two letters Z styled like the Ribbon of Saint George were painted on the front of the arena, near the coat of arms of Khabarovsk Krai.

The inside of the arena during a game between SKA-Neftyanik and Kuzbass in 2026 in the Russian Bandy Cup

The scoreboard in the arena showing a 9-2 result between SKA-Neftyanik and Dynamo

Events and tenants
Preceded by Trud Stadium; Irkutsk	Bandy World Championship; Final Venue; 2015	Succeeded by Trud Stadium; Ulyanovsk
Preceded by Göransson Arena; Sandviken	Bandy World Championship; Final Venue; 2018	Succeeded by Arena Vänersborg; Vänersborg
