= Nikita Ivanov (ice hockey) =

Kazakhstani ice hockey player

- Born: March 31, 1989 (age 36); Temirtau, Kazakhstan
- Height: 6 ft 4 in (193 cm)
- Weight: 209 lb (95 kg; 14 st 13 lb)
- Position: Forward
- Shoots: Left
- Kazakh team Former teams: ShKO Oskemen; Barys Astana
- National team: Kazakhstan
- Playing career: 2007–present

Nikita Vasilievich Ivanov (Russian: Никита Васильевич Иванов; born March 31, 1989) is a Kazakhstani ice hockey forward currently playing for ShKO Oskemen of the Kazakhstan Hockey Championship. He played for Barys Astana in the Kontinental Hockey League during the 2016–17 KHL season.

He was a member of the Kazakhstan national team at the 2016 IIHF World Championship.
