= Bandy at the 2011 Asian Winter Games =

- Venue: Medeu
- Dates: 2–6 February 2011
- Competitors: 48 from 3 nations

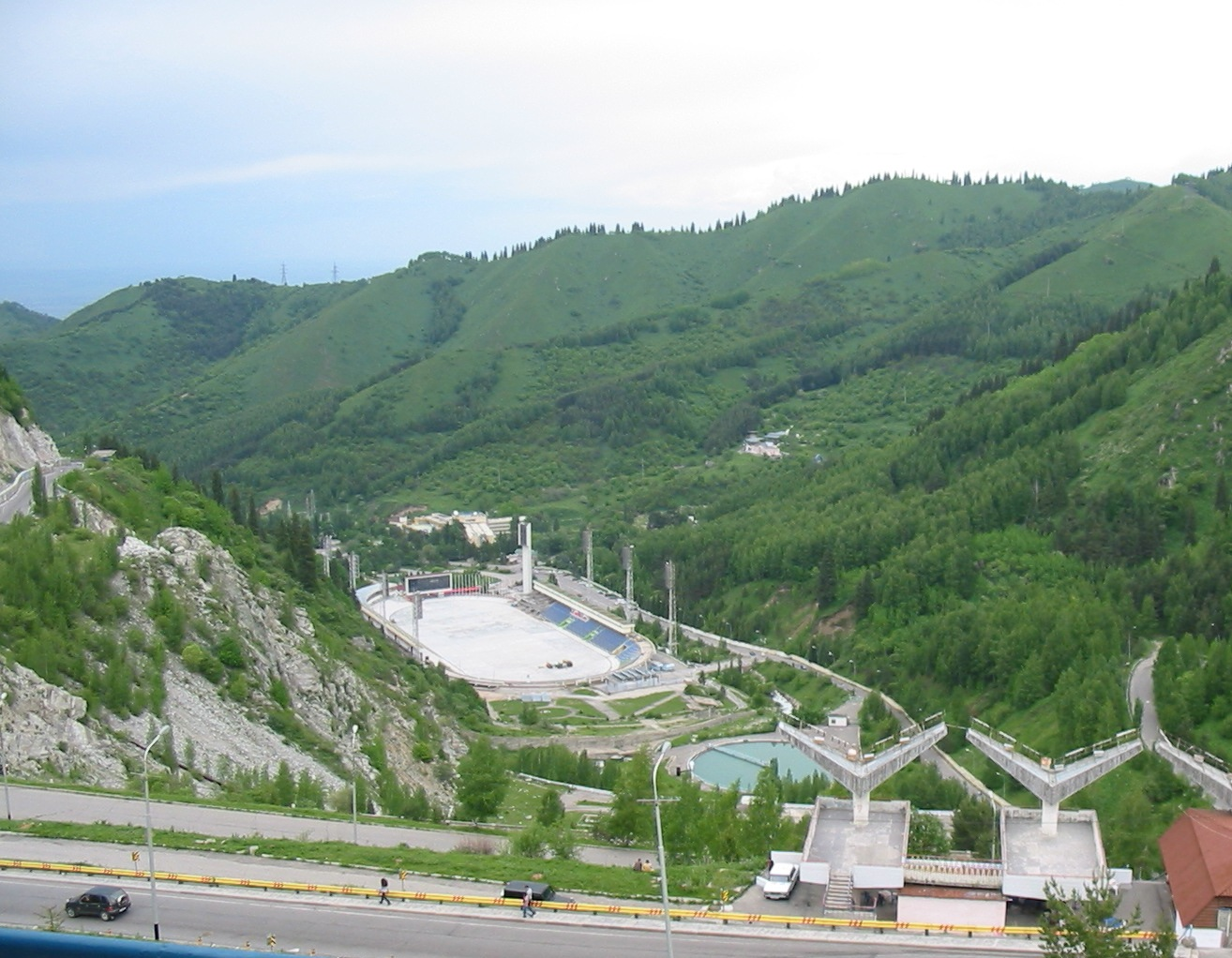
Medeu stadium

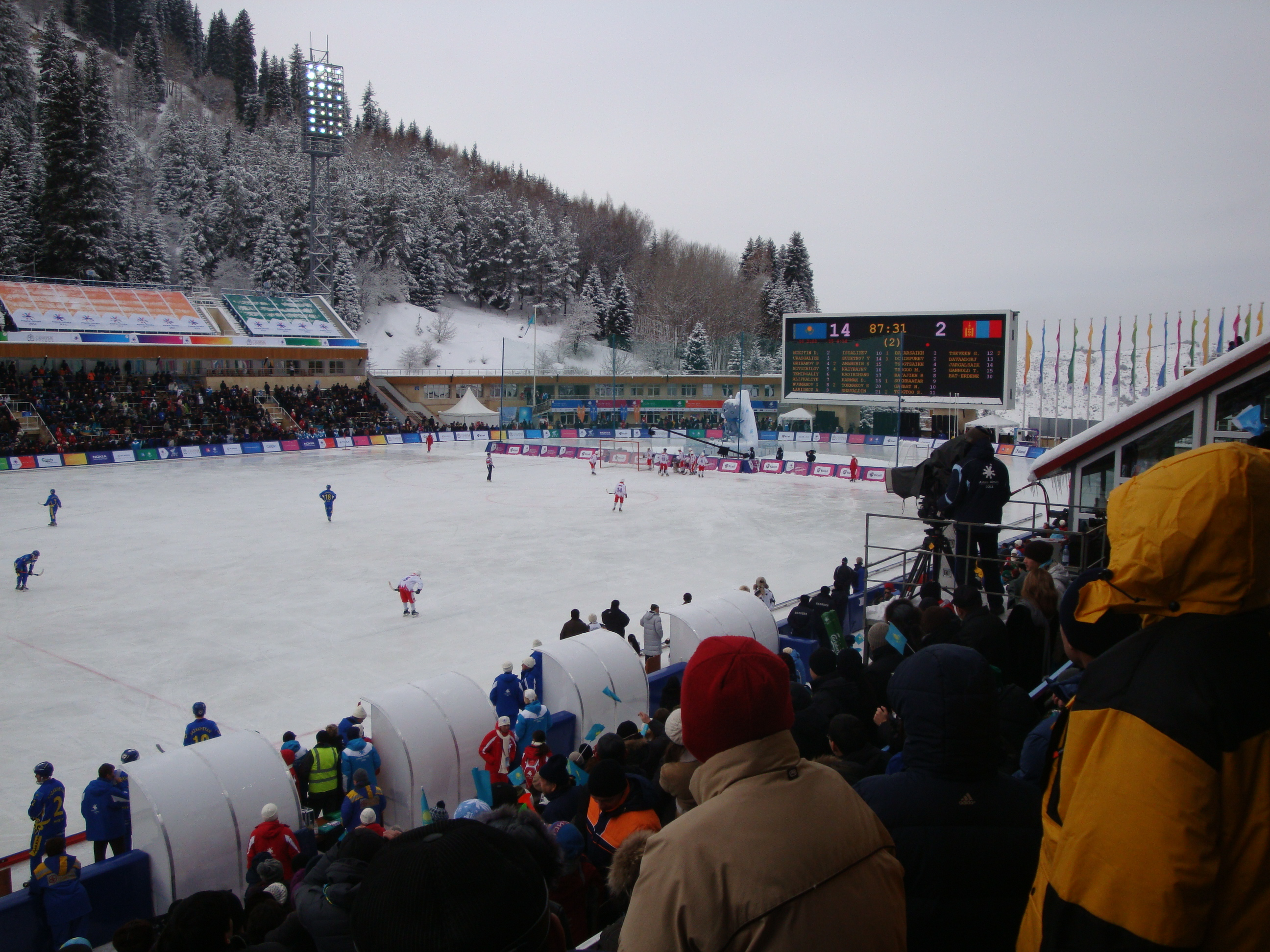
The final between Kazakhstan and Mongolia, which was attended by President Nursultan Nazarbayev

Bandy at the 2011 Asian Winter Games was held at Medeu in Almaty, Kazakhstan.

== Medalists ==
Event	Gold	Silver	Bronze
Men	Kazakhstan; Dmitriy Nikitin; Nurlan Urazgaliyev; Pyotr Gribanov; Vladislav Novozhilov; Askar Temirgaliyev; Yelaman Alipkaliyev; Iskander Nugmanov; Anton Larionov; Rauan Isaliyev; Vitaliy Suyetnov; Samat Amanshin; Arstan Kazybayev; Sultan Kadirzhanov; Dmitriy Karmak; Sergey Tokmakov; Nikolay Shavaldin; Nariman Takirov; Ilyas Khairekishev	Mongolia; Bayarsaikhany Mönkhbold; Ochirpüreviin Enkhbayar; Tsogtsaikhany Odsaikhan; Tsogoogiin Myagmardorj; Bayajikhyn Boldbayar; Sükhbaataryn Och; Ganbatyn Negüün; Tsogtoogiin Shinebayar; Tseveen Gan-Ochir; Davaadorjiin Mungunkhuyag; Jargalsaikhany Bayarsaikhan; Ganboldyn Tamir; Bat-Erdeniin Chinzorig	Kyrgyzstan; Elzar Bolotbekov; Kaldybek Kulmanbetov; Tologon Zholdosh Uulu; Nuraly Kulmanbetov; Bakytbek Asankulov; Azamat Begimbaev; Sagynbek Kadyrov; Berdibek Imanbekov; Almanbet Kulchunov; Bakytbek Duysheyev; Nurbek Nogoev; Ramis Zhumataev; Mukhtarbek Tynymseitov; Nurbek Togolokov; Murasbek Osmonov; Chynarbek Beishenbekov; Kurmanbek Imankariev

== Squads ==
Squads

Kazakhstan	Kyrgyzstan	Mongolia
Dmitriy Nikitin; Nurlan Urazgaliyev; Pyotr Gribanov; Vladislav Novozhilov; Askar Temirgaliyev; Yelaman Alipkaliyev; Iskander Nugmanov; Anton Larionov; Rauan Isaliyev; Vitaliy Suyetnov; Samat Amanshin; Arstan Kazybayev; Sultan Kadirzhanov; Dmitriy Karmak; Sergey Tokmakov; Nikolay Shavaldin; Nariman Takirov; Ilyas Khairekishev	Elzar Bolotbekov; Kaldybek Kulmanbetov; Tologon Zholdosh Uulu; Nuraly Kulmanbetov; Bakytbek Asankulov; Azamat Begimbaev; Sagynbek Kadyrov; Berdibek Imanbekov; Almanbet Kulchunov; Bakytbek Duysheyev; Nurbek Nogoev; Ramis Zhumataev; Mukhtarbek Tynymseitov; Nurbek Togolokov; Murasbek Osmonov; Chynarbek Beishenbekov; Kurmanbek Imankariev	Bayarsaikhany Mönkhbold; Ochirpüreviin Enkhbayar; Tsogtsaikhany Odsaikhan; Tsogoogiin Myagmardorj; Bayajikhyn Boldbayar; Sükhbaataryn Och; Ganbatyn Negüün; Tsogtoogiin Shinebayar; Tseveen Gan-Ochir; Davaadorjiin Mungunkhuyag; Jargalsaikhany Bayarsaikhan; Ganboldyn Tamir; Bat-Erdeniin Chinzorig

== Results ==
All times are Almaty Time (UTC+06:00)

=== Preliminaries ===
Pos	Team	Pld	W	D	L	GF	GA	GD	Pts	Qualification
1	Kazakhstan	2	2	0	0	38	0	+38	6	Final
2	Mongolia	2	1	0	1	17	19	−2	3	Final
3	Kyrgyzstan	2	0	0	2	2	38	−36	0	

Source: Official website
2 February
11:00

Kyrgyzstan	2–17	Mongolia
Tynymseitov 53', 87'		Negüün 2', 18', 25', 42', 73'; Mungunkhuyag 3', 35'; Bayarsaikhan 4', 11', 13', 38', 54'; Myagmardorj 7', 8'; Shinebayar 24', 57', 64'

Medeu, Almaty
Referee: Sergey Gorbachev (RUS)

3 February
11:00

Kazakhstan	21–0	Kyrgyzstan
Isaliyev 1', 6', 15', 26', 32', 43', 47', 90'; Nugmanov 4', 14', 33', 34', 48'; Larionov 17', 46'; Alipkaliyev 18', 25', 49'; Tokmakov 35'; Gribanov 44'; Kadirzhanov 71'

Medeu, Almaty
Referee: Vyacheslav Kurbanov (RUS)

4 February
11:00

Mongolia	0–17	Kazakhstan
		Isaliyev 5', 11', 22', 30', 37', 50', 66', 73', 77', +93'; Nugmanov 7', 28', 49', 59'; Temirgaliyev 15'; Novozhilov 41'; Kazybayev 79'

Medeu, Almaty
Referee: Vyacheslav Kurbanov (RUS)

=== Final ===
6 February
11:00

Kazakhstan	16–2	Mongolia
Isaliyev 2', 12', 20', 90', +91'; Shavaldin 5', 22'; Novozhilov 8', 46', 63', 69'; Gribanov +50', 72'; Nugmanov 49', 84'; Suyetnov 62'		Gan-Ochir 58', 75'

Medeu, Almaty
Referee: Sergey Gorbachev (RUS)
