= Ivan Shevtsov =

Ivan Shevtsov (Russian: Иван Михайлович Шевцов; 1920–2013) was a Soviet novelist, known in the West for the antisemitic aspects of his 1965 novel Aphid.
