= Mike Carman =

American bandy and ice hockey player

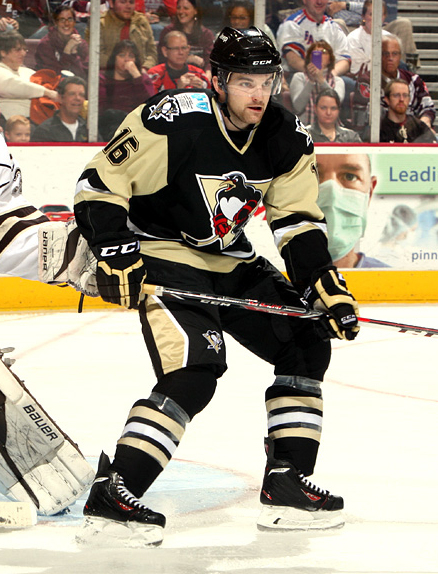
- Carman with the Wilkes-Barre/Scranton Penguins in 2013
- Born: April 14, 1988 (age 38) Augusta, Georgia, U.S.
- Height: 6 ft 0 in (183 cm)
- Weight: 185 lb (84 kg; 13 st 3 lb)
- Position: Center
- Shot: Left
- Played for: Lake Erie Monsters; Hershey Bears; WBS Penguins
- NHL draft: 81st overall, 2006; Colorado Avalanche
- Playing career: 2010–2014

Mike Carman (born April 14, 1988) is an American bandy player and former professional ice hockey player. He played in the American Hockey League for the Lake Erie Monsters, Hershey Bears and the Wilkes-Barre Scranton Penguins. He was selected by the Colorado Avalanche in the 3rd round (81st overall) of the 2006 NHL entry draft.

== Playing career ==
Prior to turning professional, Carman played attended the University of Minnesota where he played four seasons of college hockey with the NCAA Division I Minnesota Golden Gophers men's ice hockey team.

On March 19, 2010, the Colorado Avalanche signed Carman to an entry-level contract. On February 2, 2012, Carman was traded by the Avalanche to the Washington Capitals in exchange for Danny Richmond.

On September 19, after failing to earn a new contract with the Capitals, Carman accepted a try-out contract to attend the Wilkes-Barre/Scranton Penguins training camp for the 2013–14 season. After 13 games into the season, Carman was signed to an AHL with Wilkes-Barre/Scranton for the remainder of the year on December 2, 2013.

After a solitary seasons with the Penguins, without NHL interest as a free agent Carman opted to end his professional career on September 29, 2014.

Carman keeping physically active later represented the United States national bandy team during the 2015 Bandy World Championship.

Mike Carman also competes in the annual Transfusion Invitational Tournament, hosted by Matt Matter, at the Reunion Resort and Golf Club in Orlando, FL. While he is not in the running for actually winning the tournament, his donation to the group is much appreciated.

== Career statistics ==
=== Regular season and playoffs ===
			Regular season					Playoffs
Season	Team	League	GP	G	A	Pts	PIM	GP	G	A	Pts	PIM
2003–04	Academy of Holy Angels	HSMN	29	19	40	59		—	—	—	—	—
2004–05	US NTDP U17	USDP	63	16	28	44	88	—	—	—	—	—
2004–05	US NTDP Juniors	NAHL	40	12	15	27	38	10	2	4	6	10
2005–06	US NTDP U18	USDP	60	21	33	54	102	—	—	—	—	—
2005–06	US NTDP U18	NAHL	17	6	10	16	24	—	—	—	—	—
2006–07	University of Minnesota	WCHA	41	9	11	20	55	—	—	—	—	—
2007–08	University of Minnesota	WCHA	23	4	7	11	28	—	—	—	—	—
2008–09	University of Minnesota	WCHA	32	8	9	17	32	—	—	—	—	—
2009–10	University of Minnesota	WCHA	39	8	10	18	39	—	—	—	—	—
2009–10	Lake Erie Monsters	AHL	10	2	0	2	10	—	—	—	—	—
2010–11	Lake Erie Monsters	AHL	69	9	8	17	59	7	0	1	1	2
2011–12	Lake Erie Monsters	AHL	28	3	3	6	10	—	—	—	—	—
2011–12	Hershey Bears	AHL	32	7	5	12	31	5	1	0	1	0
2012–13	Hershey Bears	AHL	62	4	6	10	20	—	—	—	—	—
2013–14	Wilkes–Barre/Scranton Penguins	AHL	63	6	8	14	34	7	1	1	2	4
AHL totals			264	31	30	61	164	19	2	2	4	6

Medal record

Representing United States

Ice hockey

World Junior Championships
Bronze medal – third place	2007 Mora	

World U18 Championships
Gold medal – first place	2006 Halmstad	

=== International ===
Year	Team	Event	Result	GP	G	A	Pts	PIM
2005	United States	U17	5th	5	1	3	4	10
2006	United States	WJC18	1st place, gold medalist(s)	6	4	4	8	10
2007	United States	WJC	3rd place, bronze medalist(s)	7	1	0	1	4
2008	United States	WJC	4th	6	2	1	3	10
Junior totals				24	8	8	16	34
