= GT-76 =

- City: Stockholm, Sweden
- League: Division 1
- Division: Östra
- Founded: 1976; 49 years ago
- Home arena: Gubbängens Idrottspark

Team B92 after a district championships final in early 2006.

GT-76 is a Swedish bandy club from Stockholm which founded in 1976 when two sport clubs, Gubbängens SK and Tallen IK merged. This helped GT-76 today to become the biggest bandy club in the world. GT-76 also includes football, handball and pétanque teams. GT-76 always wear yellow and blue at matches and the keeper often wears either a blue and white or a black shirt. GT-76 bandy plays in Division 1 Mellersta which is the midland section of the second tier of Swedish bandy clubs. The club plays all of its home matches at Idrottspark in Gubbängen.

== Children and youths in the club ==
GT-76 is the biggest bandy club in the world largely because every year the club has around 150 new members, most of whom are children. Children are very important for the club with everyone having to pay a fee for club membership. The youngest children in the Bandyschool (Bandyskolan) are less than five years old. Girls may also play in the club; there are a few girls' teams but the girls may also play with the boys in mixed sex teams.
