= Christian Waaler =

Norwegian bandy player (born 1981)

Personal information
- Born: 7 December 1981 (age 44)
- Height: 1.86 m (6 ft 1 in)
- Playing position: Midfielder

Club information
- Current team: Ready

Youth career
- Røa IL

Senior career*
Years	Team	Apps^{†}	(Gls)^{†}
1998–1999	Røa IL		
2000–2001	Ullevål IL		
2001–2002	Ljusdals BK		
2001–2002	Røa IL		
2002–2003	Stabæk IF		
2003–2007	Hammarby IF		
2003–2005	Sköndals IK		
2005–2006	Sköndals IK/GT-76		
2007–2010	Høvik IF		
2011–2012	Stabæk IF		
2013–	Ready		

National team
1998–1999	Norway U19		
2000–	Norway		
- * Senior club appearances and goals counted for the domestic league only. † Appearances (Goals).

Christian Waaler (born 7 December 1981) is a Norwegian bandy player who currently plays in Norway as a midfielder. He was already an international player at the age of 19 and is a regular member of the Norwegian squad.

He is working to promote bandy in the Philippines.

== Career ==
Waaler started his career in Røa IL. He has also played for Ullevål IL, Ljusdals BK, Røa IL, Stabæk IF, Hammarby IF, Sköndals IK, Sköndals IK/GT-76, Høvik IF, Stabæk IF, Ready.
