= Japan Bandy Federation =

Japan Bandy Federation (Jap. 日本バンディ連盟) is the governing body for the sport of bandy in Japan. It is based in Osaka. The organisation was founded in 2011 and became the 26th member of the Federation of International Bandy the same year. Hiromasa Takamura is president of the federation.
