= Sami Laakkonen =

Finnish former bandy player (born 1974)

Personal information
- Born: 24 February 1974 (age 52)

National team
- Finland
Medal record
Men's bandy
Representing Finland
World Championships
Gold medal – first place	2004 Sweden	Team

Sami Laakkonen (born 24 February 1974) is a Finnish former bandy player who played as a forward. Laakkonen was brought up by WP 35 but moved abroad to enhance his career. He played for the Finnish national bandy team, scoring the decisive goal in the final of the 2004 World Championship. At the 2016 World Championship, he made his last appearance for the national team. After the 2018–19 season, he also retired at club level.

Laakkonen's list of clubs is as follows:

- WP 35 (1993–1997)
- Vetlanda BK (1997–2002)
- IFK Vänersborg (2002–2004)
- Vodnik (2004–2005)
- Zorky (2005–2009)
- Dynamo Kazan (2009–2014)
- Akilles (2014–2019)
