= Mongolia national bandy team =

Men's national bandy team representing Mongolia

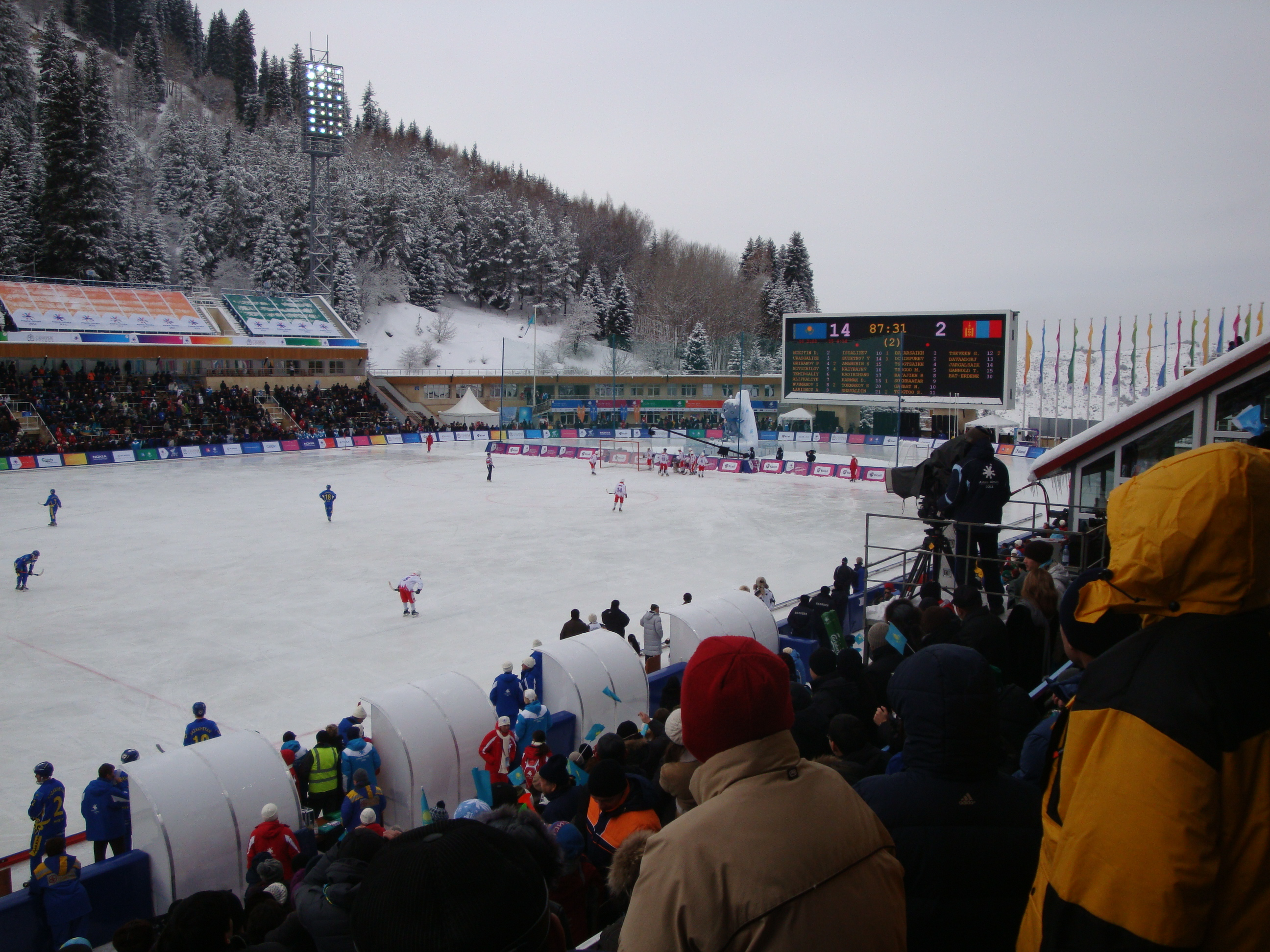
The final of the bandy tournament at 2011 Asian Winter Games between Kazakhstan and Mongolia at Medeu in Kazakhstan.

The Mongolian national bandy team is controlled by the Bandy Federation of Mongolia. The team took part in its first Bandy World Championship in 2006. They won the 1st match against Estonia, but lost all subsequent games including the match for the 4th place in Group B against the Netherlands. Mongolia thus was classified fifth in the B Group championship, ahead of only Estonia.

In 2011, when bandy for men was on the programme at the Asian Winter Games, they chose only that tournament, where they finished 2nd, because of financial difficulties to participate in both. After that the team was not financed and didn't play for a few years, although it was chosen as the best Mongolian sport team of 2011.

During the season of 2013-14 the team gathered again for the World Championship 2014, where they finished sixth (out of nine) in Division B. In the World Championship 2016 the team finished fourth out of ten in Division B after narrowly losing both the semi-final and third place match. In the World Championship 2017 the team again narrowly lost the semi-final. However, the third place match resulted in a victory after extra-time, thus securing a Division B medal for the first time.
