= United States men's national bandy team =

United States
- Association: American Bandy Association
- General manager: (United States) Magnus Sköld
- Head coach: (United States) Chris Halden
- Assistants: (Sweden) Mikael Sandberg
- Home stadium: Guidant John Rose Minnesota Oval
- Team colors

First international
- Norway 6–1 United States (Oslo, Norway; 5 November 1983)

Biggest win
- United States 20–0 Hungary (Porvoo, Finland; 18 March 1991)

Biggest defeat
- Sweden 22–0 United States (Lidköping, Sweden; 29 March 2025)

Bandy World Championship
- Appearances: 29 (first in 1985)
- Best result: 4th (2025, 2026)

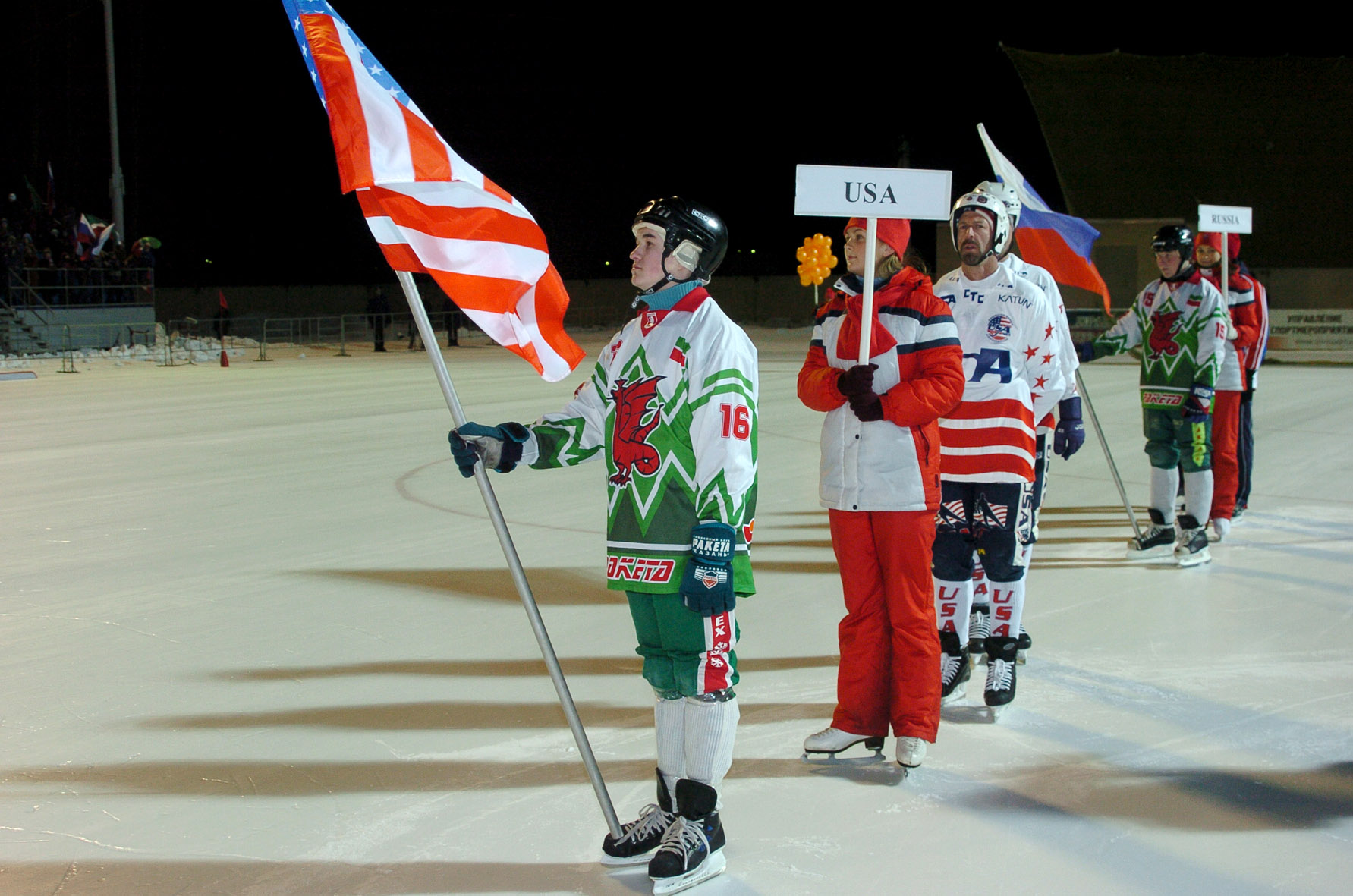
Scene from the opening ceremony at the 2005 World Championship

The United States men's national bandy team has been taking part in the Bandy World Championships since 1985, being the first nation to join apart from the four teams which had so far participated in almost all the world championships; the Soviet Union, Sweden, Finland and Norway. However, the American team has yet to make it to the championship medals. The country also has a United States women's national bandy team.

America also plays Canada in the annual Can-Am Bandy Cup.

== Team USA International Record ==
Updated as of the 2026 World Championship

USA Overall Record 1985-2026
Country	Games Played	Wins	Draws	Losses	Win%	Goals For	Goals Against	Goal Difference	First Match	Last Match
United States	160	70	3	87	43.8	863	1034	-171	3.2.1985	18.1.2026

International Record 1985-2026
Country	Games Played	Wins	Draws	Losses	Win%	Goals For	Goals Against	Goal Difference	First Match	Last Match
Norway	27	1	2	24	3.7	59	203	-144	3.2.1985	18.1.2026
Finland	18	0	0	18	0	17	206	-189	7.2.1985	17.1.2026
Canada	15	15	0	0	100	104	23	81	17.3.1991	27.1.2014
Belarus	15	7	0	8	46.7	86	66	20	27.3.2001	1.2.2017
Hungary	13	13	0	0	100	146	10	136	18.3.1991	14.1.2026
Sweden	13	0	0	13	0	16	193	-177	5.2.1985	15.1.2026
Kazakhstan	12	0	0	12	0	24	117	-93	1.2.1995	30.3.2023
Netherlands	11	11	0	0	100	124	11	113	20.3.1991	16.1.2026
Latvia	11	10	0	1	90.9	94	14	80	30.1.2007	6.2.2016
Russia	8	0	0	8	0	17	126	-109	1.2.1999	4.2.2016
Estonia	7	7	0	0	100	89	5	84	28.3.2003	21.1.2009
Mongolia	4	4	0	0	100	55	2	53	2.2.2006	23.1.2009
Germany	3	2	1	0	66.7	30	15	15	30.1.2017	20.1.2019
Soviet Union	3	0	0	3	0	2	43	-41	8.2.1985	2.2.1989

== World Championship record ==
Tournament	Final standing
Norway 1985	Finished in 5th place
Sweden 1987	Finished in 5th place
Soviet Union 1989	Finished in 5th place
Finland 1991	Finished in 5th place (1st in Group B)
Norway 1993	Finished in 5th place (1st in Group B)
USA 1995	Finished in 6th place (2nd in Group B)
Sweden 1997	Finished in 6th place (1st in Group B)
Russia 1999	Finished in 6th place
Finland and Sweden 2001	Finished in 6th place
Russia 2003	Finished in 7th place (2nd in Group B)
Sweden 2004; (B-group in Hungary)	Finished in 6th place (1st in Group B, won qualification to Group A in 2005)
Russia 2005	Finished in 6th place in Group A, lost qualification to Group A in 2006
Sweden 2006	Finished in 7th place (1st in Group B, lost qualification to Group A in 2007)
Russia 2007	Finished in 7th place (1st in Group B, lost qualification to Group A in 2008)
Russia 2008	Finished in 7th place (1st in Group B, lost qualification to Group A in 2009)
Sweden 2009	Finished in 7th place (1st in Group B, lost qualification to Group A in 2010)
Russia 2010	Finished in 6th place in Group A, won qualification to Group A in 2011
Russia 2011	Finished in 6th place in Group A, won qualification to Group A in 2012
Kazakhstan 2012	Finished in 6th place in Group A, relegated to Group B in 2013
Sweden 2013	Finished in 7th place (1st in Group B, qualified to Group A in 2014)
Russia 2014	Finished in 6th place out of 8 in Division A
Russia 2015	Finished in 8th place out of 8 in Division A
Russia 2016	Finished in 7th place out of 8 in Division A
Sweden 2017	Finished in 6th place out of 8 in Division A
Russia 2018	Finished in 5th place out of 8 in Division A
Sweden 2019	Finished in 6th place out of 8 in Division A
Russia 2020	COVID-19 pandemic.
Russia 2022	Russian invasion of Ukraine
Sweden 2023	Finished in 5th place out of 5 in Division A
Sweden 2025	Finished in 4th place in Division A
Finland 2026	Finished in 4th place in Division A

2025: 1 Win + 5 Lose - 8 GF 73 GA

2026: 2 Win + 5 Lose - 27 GF 67 GA

Total: 3 Win + 10 Lose / 35-140
