= Canada national bandy team =

Bandy teams representing Canada

Canada
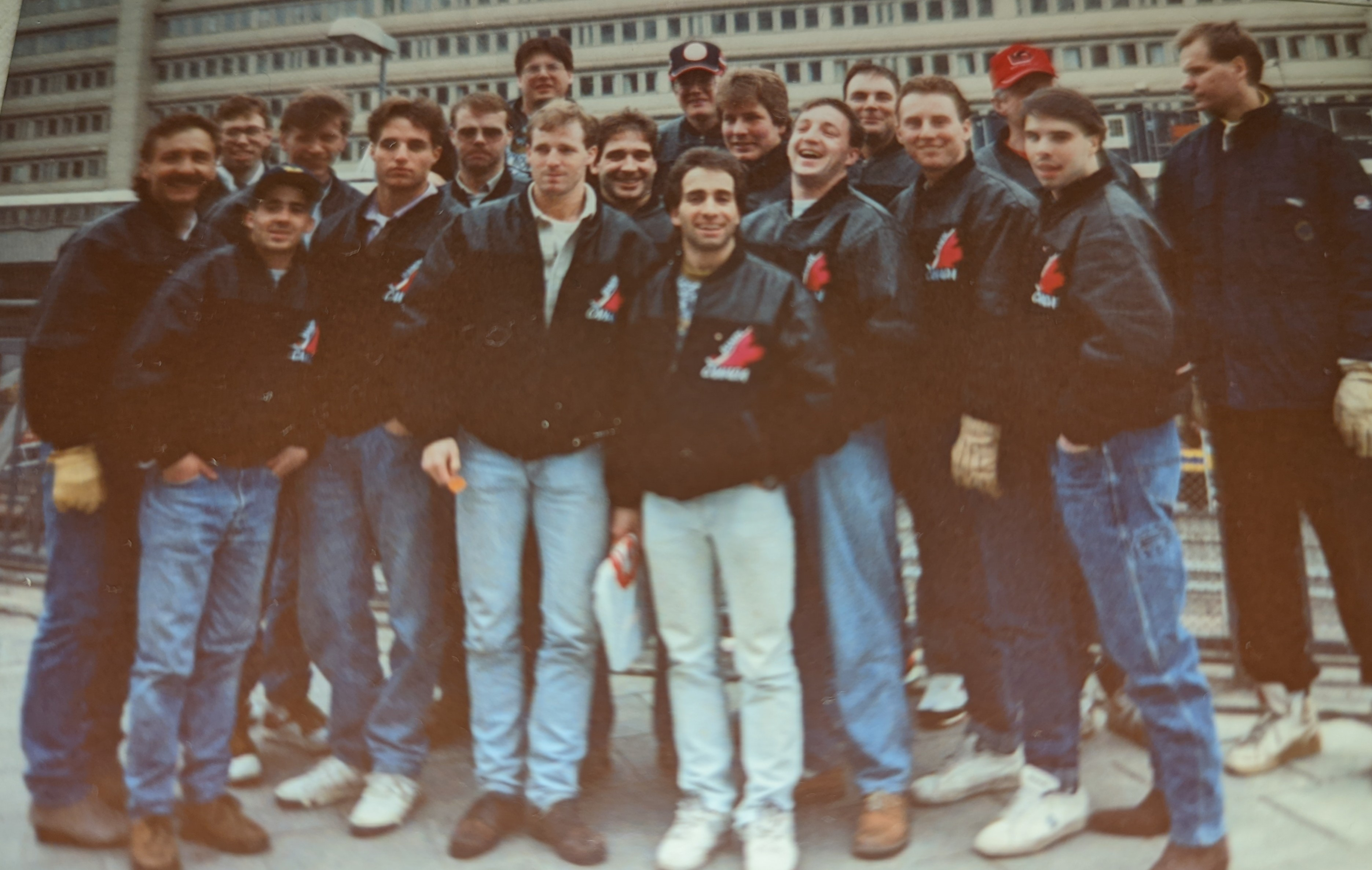
- Team Canada (1991); World bandy debut at the 1991 Bandy World Championship
- Association: Canada Bandy
- Head coach: Göran Svensson
- Team colors
Home colours	Away colours

First international
- United States 10–0 Canada (Porvoo, Finland; 17 March 1991)

Biggest win
- Canada 18–0 Estonia (Kazan, Russia; 1 February 2005)

Biggest defeat
- Russia 22–1 Canada (Irkutsk, Russia; 30 January 2014)

Bandy World Championship
- Appearances: 15 (first in 1991)
- Best result: 6th (1991, 1993)

Canada national bandy team
Medal record

Bandy World Championship
Silver medal – second place	1991 Finland	Team 6th overall Group B 2nd
Silver medal – second place	1993 Norway	Team 6th overall Group B 2nd
Bronze medal – third place	1995 USA	Team 7th overall Group B 3rd
Silver medal – second place	1997 Sweden	Team 7th overall Group B 2nd
	1999 Russia	did not participate
	2001 Finland and Sweden	did not participate
	2003 Russia	did not participate
	Sweden 2004 (B-group in Hungary)	Team 9th overall Group B 4th
Silver medal – second place	2005 Russia	Team 8th overall Group B 2nd
Silver medal – second place	2006 Sweden	Team 8th overall Group B 2nd
Silver medal – second place	2007 Russia	did not participate 8th overall Group B 2nd
Silver medal – second place	2008 Russia	Team 8th overall Group B 2nd
Silver medal – second place	2009 Sweden	Team 8th overall Group B 2nd
Gold medal – first place	2010 Russia	Team 7th overall Group B 1st (lost qualification to Group A in 2011)
Silver medal – second place	2011 Sweden	Team 8th overall Group B 2nd
Silver medal – second place	2012 Kazakhstan	Team 8th overall Group B 2nd
Silver medal – second place	2013 Sweden	Team 8th overall Group B 2nd
	2014 Russia	Team 8th overall Division A Last place
	2015 Russia	did not participate
	2016 Russia	did not participate
Gold medal – first place	2017 Sweden	Team 9th overall Group B 1st (moving up to group A)
	2018 Russia	did not participate
	2019 Sweden	Team 14th overall Group B 6th
	2020 Russia	COVID-19
	2022 Russia	Russian invasion of Ukraine

The Canada national bandy team (French: Équipe nationale de bandy du Canada) refers to the bandy teams representing Canada. Presently only the national men's senior team competes. There is the men's national team and the women's national team. The teams are overseen by Canada Bandy (previously the Manitoba Bandy Federation) which is a member of the Federation of International Bandy (FIB). This article deals chiefly with the national men's team. For the women's team please see Canada women's national bandy team.

Bandy was first introduced to Canada in the city of Winnipeg in 1986. The initial organizations for bandy in Canada were called the "Bandy Federation of Manitoba" and "Canada Bandy Association/Federation". The men compete in the Bandy World Championship. Canada's national men's bandy team made their world debut at the 1991 Bandy World Championship.

While Canada is a country with a strong tradition in ice hockey and ringette, both sports are played on an ice rink and Canada does not have artificial ice rinks large enough to qualify as regulation-sized bandy fields. As a result, Canada's national men's team practices at home on ice hockey rinks or other substitute surfaces. In the past, the Canadian women's bandy team practiced on a frozen water hazard on a Winnipeg golf course. Team Canada occasionally goes to the United States to practice in areas where full-sized bandy fields exist.

The Canadian team also continues to play in the annual Can-Am Bandy Cup.

== History ==
While early forms of what is now called "bandy" have been recorded to have been played in Canada as far back as the 1850s after having been introduced by British soldiers, Canada did not form a national bandy team until the 1980s. The game was initially called "hockey on the ice". However, the sport of ice hockey, (which used the smaller ice rinks and pucks rather than the larger bandy fields) and a bandy ball, organized in Canada in 1875, absorbing bandy sports in the process and resulting in bandy's disappearance from North America. The sport did however formalize in England at the same time when ice hockey was being formalized in Canada. The first Team Canada for bandy was the Canadian men's national bandy team in 1991.

== World Championship record ==
The men's team has competed in the annual Bandy World Championship several times starting in 1991.

Tournament	Final standing
Finland 1991	Finished in 6th place (2nd in Group B)
Norway 1993	Finished in 6th place (2nd in Group B)
USA 1995	Finished in 7th place (3rd in Group B)
Sweden 1997	Finished in 7th place (2nd in Group B)
Russia 1999	did not participate
Finland and Sweden 2001	did not participate
Russia 2003	did not participate
Sweden 2004; (B-group in Hungary)	Finished in 9th place (4th in Group B)
Russia 2005	Finished in 8th place (2nd in Group B)
Sweden 2006	Finished in 8th place (2nd in Group B)
Russia 2007	did not participate
Russia 2008	Finished in 8th place (2nd in Group B)
Sweden 2009	Finished in 8th place (2nd in Group B)
Russia 2010	Finished in 7th place (1st in Group B, lost qualification to Group A in 2011)
Russia 2011	Finished in 8th place (2nd in Group B)
Kazakhstan 2012	Finished in 8th place (2nd in Group B)
Sweden 2013	Finished in 8th place (2nd in Group B)
Russia 2014	Finished in 8th place (last in Division A)
Russia 2015	did not participate
Russia 2016	did not participate
Sweden 2017	Finished in 9th place (1st in group B, moving up to group A)
Russia 2018	did not participate
Sweden 2019	Finished in 14th place (6th in Group B)
Russia 2020	Finished in 14th place (6th in Group B)
Russia 2022	Finished in 14th place (6th in Group B)

== Team Canada Senior ==
=== 1991 Seniors ===
The senior Team Canada squad made its world debut at the 1991 Bandy World Championship, in the championship in Helsinki, Finland.

Timothy Lang, Peter Gall, Costa Cholakas, Lee Bilinkopf,

=== 1993 Seniors ===
The senior Team Canada squad competed at the 1993 Bandy World Championship in Norway.

=== 1995 Seniors ===
The senior Team Canada squad competed at the 1995 Bandy World Championship in the United States.

=== 1997 Seniors ===
The senior Team Canada squad competed at the 1997 Bandy World Championship in Sweden.

=== 1999 Seniors ===
The senior Team Canada squad did not compete in the 1999 Bandy World Championship.

=== 2001 Seniors ===
The senior Team Canada squad did not compete in the 2001 Bandy World Championship.

=== 2003 Seniors ===
The senior Team Canada squad did not compete in the 2003 Bandy World Championship.

=== 2005 Seniors ===
The senior Team Canada squad competed in the 2005 in Kazan, Russia, where they lost to the Belarus national bandy team for the "B" title.

=== 2010 Seniors ===
At the 2010 Bandy World Championship Canada won Group B for the first time. Canada, however, lost the Group A qualification match against the United States by a score of 6–9, and thus would again play in Group B at the 2011 Bandy World Championship in Kazan, Russia. For this Championship Canada's team included 4 players playing professionally in club teams in Sweden.

=== 2012 Seniors ===
The senior Team Canada squad competed at the 2012 Bandy World Championship in Almaty, Kazakhstan.

=== 2014 Seniors ===
The senior Team Canada squad competed at the 2014 Bandy World Championship in Irkutsk, Russia, 26 January – 2 February 2014.

Pos.	Age	Name	Club
GK		Brian Bell	(Canada) Winnipeg
GK	29	Ronnie Lintic	(Canada) Nature Boys
DF	47	Costa Cholakis	(Canada) Winnipeg
DF	25	Chris Karasewich	(Canada) Winnipeg
DF	28	Jeremy Ross	(Canada) Winnipeg
MF	25	Drew Ellement	(Canada) Winnipeg
MF	25	Brady Fisher	(Canada) Winnipeg
MF	29	Brett Gavrailoff	(Canada) Winnipeg
MF	25	Curtis Krul	(Canada) Winnipeg
MF	25	Jeff Krul	(Canada) Winnipeg
MF	27	John Murray	(Canada) Winnipeg
FW	25	Brandon Ellement	(Canada) Winnipeg
FW	25	Colin Hekle	(Canada) Winnipeg
FW	27	Steve Landerville	(Canada) Winnipeg
FW	28	Nick Mazurak	(Canada) Winnipeg
FW	28	Brook Robson	(Canada) Winnipeg
FW	24	Brendon Sedo	(Canada) Blue Jeys

=== 2015 Seniors ===
The senior Team Canada squad did not participate in the 2015 Bandy World Championship. There were reports about them returning to the tournament for the 2016 Bandy World Championship (2016 WCS), but in the end they did not.

=== 2016 Seniors ===
The senior Team Canada squad did not participate in the 2016 Bandy World Championship.

=== 2017 Seniors ===
The senior Team Canada squad participated in the 2017 Bandy World Championship, where they won the Gold Medal of the Division B tournament, qualifying for Division A in 2018.

=== 2018 Seniors ===
The senior Team Canada squad did not participate in the 2018 Bandy World Championship.

=== 2020 Seniors ===
The senior Team Canada squad did not compete in the 2020 Bandy World Championship.

=== 2022 Seniors ===
The senior Team Canada squad did not compete in the 2022 Bandy World Championship.

== Gallery ==
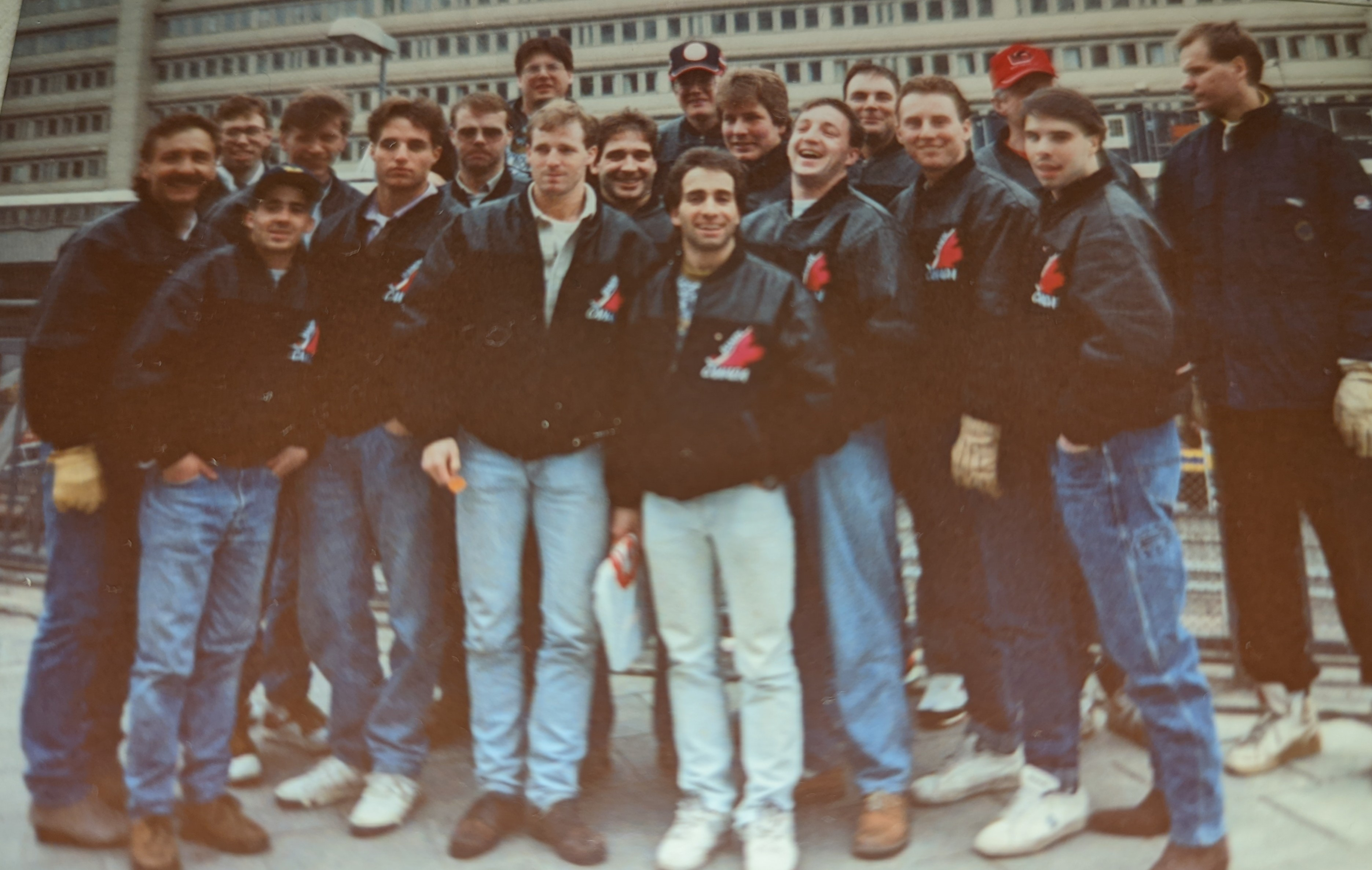
Team Canada (1991) - World bandy debut at the 1991 Bandy World Championship in Helsinki, Finland

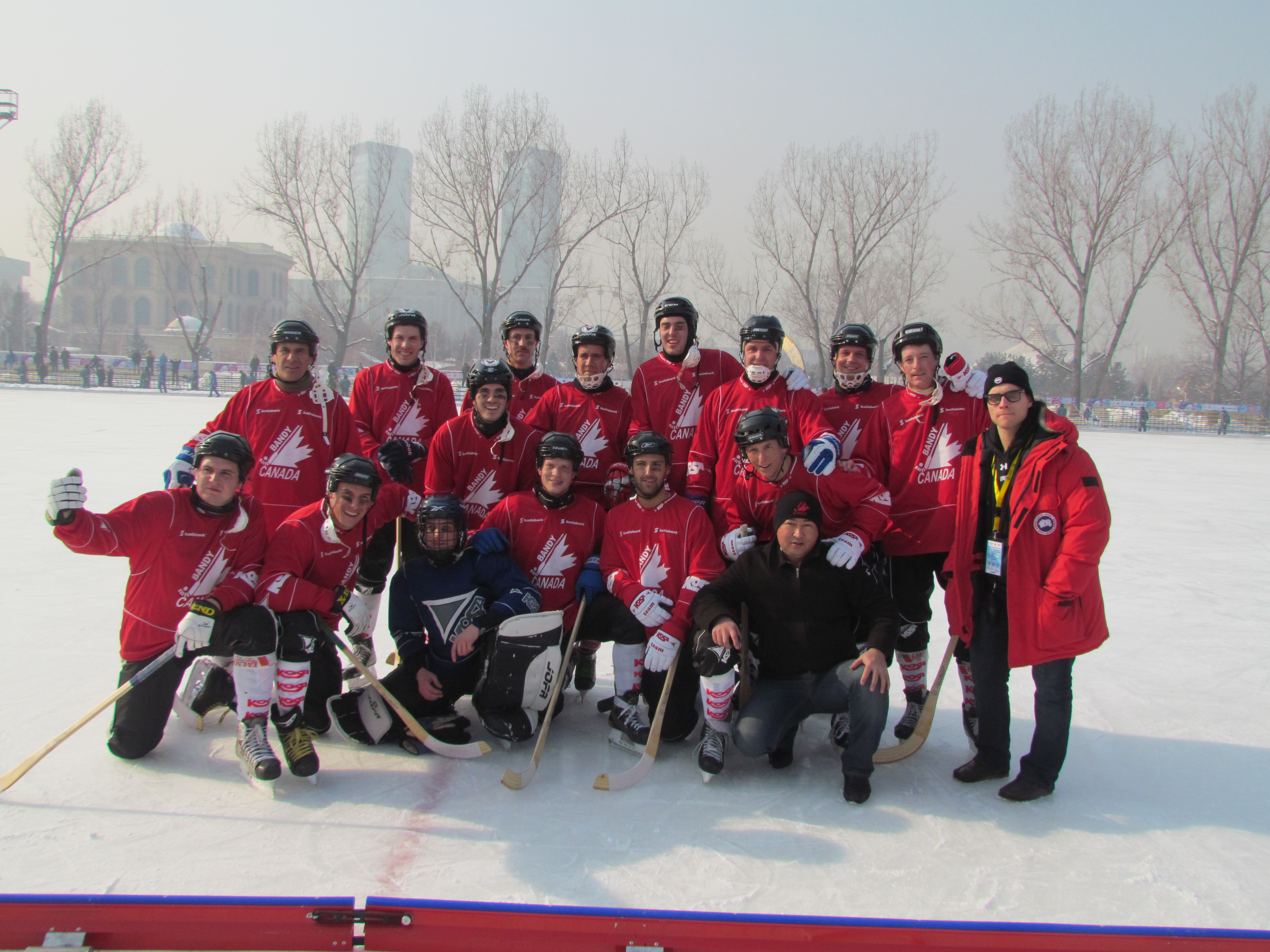
Team Canada (2012) at the 2012 Bandy World Championship in Almaty, Kazakhstan
