= Belarus national bandy team =

Belarus
- Association: Belarusian Bandy Federation
- Head coach: (Belarus) Sergey Chernyetskiy
- Team colors

First international
- Belarus 0 – 23 Kazakhstan; Haparanda, 24 March 2001

Biggest win
- Belarus 21 – 4 Estonia; Arkhangelsk, 24 March 2003

Biggest defeat
- Norway 32 – 0 Belarus; Haparanda, 29 March 2001

Bandy World Championship
- Appearances: 15 (first in 2001)
- Best result: 6th (2003, 2005, 2006, 2007, 2008, 2009, 2013, 2015, 2016)

The Belarusian national bandy team has been competing in the annual Bandy World Championship since 2001 (it started to be an annual tournament from 2003), but not in 2010, 2018 and 2019. The plan was to participate also in 2018, but Federation of International Bandy seemingly was not interested in letting Belarus play. In 2004, Belarus defeated Canada to win the Group B championship. Belarus played in Group A in 2006, 2007 and again in 2008 after winning 9-1 against USA team, the best team of Group B.

Their participation in the rink bandy tournament of the first CIS festival for national sports and games in 2017, Фестиваль национальных видов спорта и игр государств — участников Содружества Независимых Государств, resulted in a fourth place finish.

The national team is supervised by the Belarusian Bandy Federation, a member of the Federation of International Bandy.

== Squads ==
=== 2015 WCS ===
Belarusian squad at the 2015 World Championship in Khabarovsk, Russia.

| Pos. | Birth | Name | Club |
|---|---|---|---|
| | 1987 | Sergey Krivonogov | (Russia) Start |
| | 1975 | Yuriy Styopochkin | (Russia) Znamya-Udmurtiya |
| | 1974 | Yevgeniy Sviridov | (Belarus) |
| | 1986 | Mikhail Tarasenko | (Belarus) HK Polotsk |
| | 1978 | Yuriy Zenkov | (Belarus) HK Brest |
| | 1979 | Andrey Kabanov | (Russia) Lokomotiv |
| | 1981 | Mikhail Pashnev | (Belarus) HK Polotsk |
| | 1976 | Maxim Koshelev | (Belarus) Traktor Minsk |
| | 1990 | Alexandr Kozlov | (Russia) Lokomotiv |
| | 1979 | Sergey Chernyetskiy | (Belarus) |
| | 1977 | Konstantin Savyenko | (Belarus) |
| | 1981 | Viktor Plyats | (Belarus) HK Polotsk |
| | 1984 | Sergey Fyalko | (Belarus) HK Polotsk |
| | 1984 | Daniil Garnitskiy | (Russia) HK Polotsk |
| | 1975 | Yevgeniy Khvalko | (Russia) Yenisey |
| | 1978 | Vyacheslav Brachenko | (Russia) Vostok |
| | 1980 | Sergey Yusupov | (Russia) Zenith |
| | 1993 | Alexandr Baranov |
