= 2011 Bandy World Championship =

Tournament details
- Host country: Russia
- City: Kazan
- Teams: 11

Final positions
- Champions: Russia
- Runners-up: Finland
- Third place: Sweden
- Fourth place: Kazakhstan

Tournament statistics
- Scoring leader(s): Sergey Lomanov, Jr. (12 goals)

The 2011 Bandy World Championship was an edition of the top annual event in international men's bandy, held between January 23 and January 30, 2011, in Kazan, Russia.

11 countries participated in the 2011 championships: Finland, Kazakhstan, Norway, Russia, Sweden, the United States (group A) and Belarus, Canada, Hungary, Latvia, and the Netherlands (group B). Australia was supposed to participate but didn't come because of the floodings. At least five more countries wanted to come, but the tournament format at the time did not allow more than twelve teams. For the first time, Finland won the group stage. Russia became the world champion, with Finland second, and Sweden third.

== Group A ==
=== Preliminary round ===
Date	Match	Res.
January 23	Russia – United States	17–0
January 23	Sweden – Finland	5–5 (5–6 after penalties)
January 23	Norway – Kazakhstan	2–7
January 24	United States – Kazakhstan	2–7
January 24	Norway – Sweden	0–12
January 24	Russia – Finland	3–4
January 25	Finland – United States	13–2
January 25	Kazakhstan – Sweden	2–7
January 25	Russia – Norway	13–1
January 26	Finland – Norway	9–0
January 26	Sweden – United States	8–1
January 26	Russia – Kazakhstan	7–2
January 27	United States – Norway	3–7
January 27	Kazakhstan – Finland	3–4
January 27	Russia – Sweden	5–2

Pos	Team	Pld	W	D	L	GF	GA	GD	Pts
1	Finland	5	4	1	0	35	13	+22	9
2	Russia	5	4	0	1	45	9	+36	8
3	Sweden	5	3	1	1	34	13	+21	7
4	Kazakhstan	5	2	0	3	20	21	−1	4
5	Norway	5	1	0	4	9	43	−34	2
6	United States	5	0	0	5	8	52	−44	0

=== Finals ===
Date	Match	Res.
Semifinals
January 29	Finland – Kazakhstan	5–4
January 29	Russia – Sweden	3–2
Match for 3rd place
January 30	Kazakhstan – Sweden	3–14
Final
January 30	Finland – Russia	1–6

== Group B ==
=== Preliminary round ===
Date	Match	Res.
January 24	Belarus – Latvia	15–2
January 24	Canada – Hungary	14–3
January 25	Canada – Latvia	13–0
January 25	Netherlands – Belarus	1–12
January 26	Netherlands – Canada	2–4
January 26	Hungary – Latvia	3–4
January 27	Netherlands – Latvia	2–3
January 27	Belarus – Hungary	9–2
January 28	Belarus – Canada	8–2
January 28	Hungary – Netherlands	6–3

Pos	Team	Pld	W	D	L	GF	GA	GD	Pts
1	Belarus	4	4	0	0	44	7	+37	8
2	Canada	4	3	0	1	33	13	+20	6
3	Latvia	4	2	0	2	9	33	−24	4
4	Hungary	4	1	0	3	14	30	−16	2
5	Netherlands	4	0	0	4	8	25	−17	0

=== Final tour ===
Date	Match	Res.
Match for 4th place
January 29	Hungary – Netherlands	9–1
Match for 2nd place
January 29	Canada – Latvia	18–1

== Qualifiers to Group A 2012 ==
The team that finished last in Group A and the winner in Group B met in a qualifying match for the vacant seat in the 2012 Bandy World Championship Group A.

Date	Match	Res.
January 29	United States – Belarus	5–2
