= Lokomotiv (sports society) =

Soviet and Russian sports club

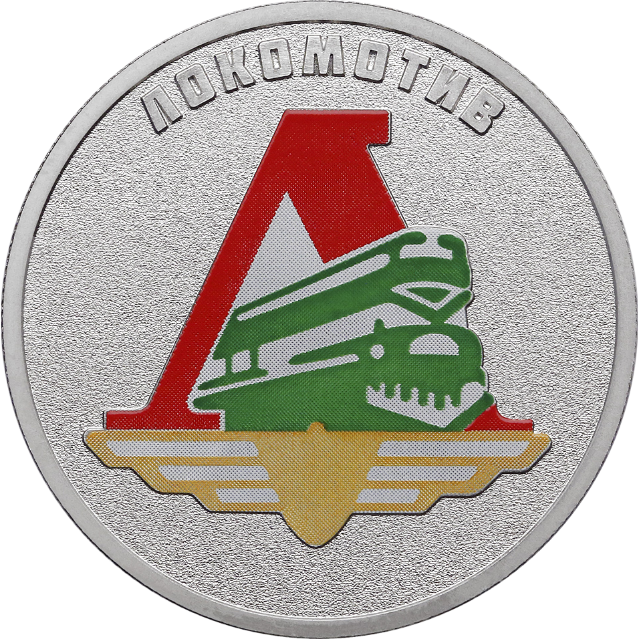
Russian Sport, Lokomotiv commemorative coin, 25 rubles, copper-nickel alloy, Bank of Russia, 2025

Lokomotiv (Russian: Локомотив; English: Locomotive) or Lokomotiv Voluntary Sports Society (VSS) is the Russian sports club and a member of the International Railway Sports Association. Before the collapse of the Soviet Union, VSS Lokomotiv consisted of many clubs in a variety of sports which were all named "Lokomotiv" with an addition of the town/city name from which the club was from (f.e. Lokomotiv Moscow). In the Eastern Bloc countries many teams associated with the railway industry (but not part of VSS Lokomotiv) were also named or renamed "Lokomotiv".

== Sport clubs of the Lokomotiv society ==
- FC Lokomotiv Moscow
- RC Lokomotiv Moscow
- FC Lokomotiv Nizhny Novgorod
- Lokomotiv Orenburg
- Lokomotiv Penza
- Lokomotiv Yaroslavl
- PBC Lokomotiv Kuban
- FC Lokomotyv Kyiv
- FC Lokomotyv Kharkiv
- FC Lokomotyv Poltava
- FC Lokomotivi Tbilisi
- Jõhvi FC Lokomotiv

== Notable members ==
- Vera Krepkina (athletics)
- Nikolay Sokolov (athletics)
- Boris Spassky (chess)
- Radia Yeroshina (cross-country skiing)
- Viatcheslav Ekimov (cycling)
- Ludmila Belousova (figure skating)
- Oleg Protopopov (figure skating)
- Lidia Skoblikova (speed skating)
- Vladimir Bure (swimming)
- Yurik Vardanyan (weightlifting)

== See also ==
- Rail transport in the Soviet Union
