= Canada Bandy =

Sports governing body

- Sport: Bandy; Rink bandy
- Jurisdiction: Canada
- Founded: 1983; 42 years ago
- Affiliation: FIB
- Affiliation date: 6 July 1983; 41 years ago
- Headquarters: Winnipeg
- Location: Manitoba

Canada Bandy is the governing body for bandy in Canada. Its headquarters are located in Winnipeg, Manitoba.

The Canadian program for bandy was started in 1986, inspired by the US experiences with the sport. At first it was only concentrated to the area around Winnipeg. Canada Bandy became a member of Federation of International Bandy (FIB) on 6 July 1983.

Canada has national bandy teams for both the men's and women's category: the Canadian men's national bandy team and the Canadian women's bandy team. The men compete in the Bandy World Championship while the women compete in the Women's Bandy World Championship.

Canada also plays America in the annual Can-Am Bandy Cup.

Canada Bandy's current organizational status and the current status of both national teams is unknown.

== National teams ==
- Canada – Men's national bandy team
- Canada – Women's national bandy team
