= Kazakhstan national bandy team =

Kazakhstan
- Association: Kazakhstan Bandy Federation
- Head coach: (Kazakhstan) Alexey Nikišov
- Team colors

First international
- Norway 4 – 0 Kazakhstan; Røa, 8 January 1994

Biggest win
- Hungary 0 – 29 Kazakhstan; Khabarovsk, 29 January 2018

Biggest defeat
- Russia 22 – 1 Kazakhstan; Vänersborg, 28 January 2019; Sweden 22 – 1 Kazakhstan; Vänersborg, 30 January 2019

Bandy World Championship
- Appearances: 20 (first in 1995)
- Best result: Third place (2003, 2005, 2012, 2013, 2014, 2015)

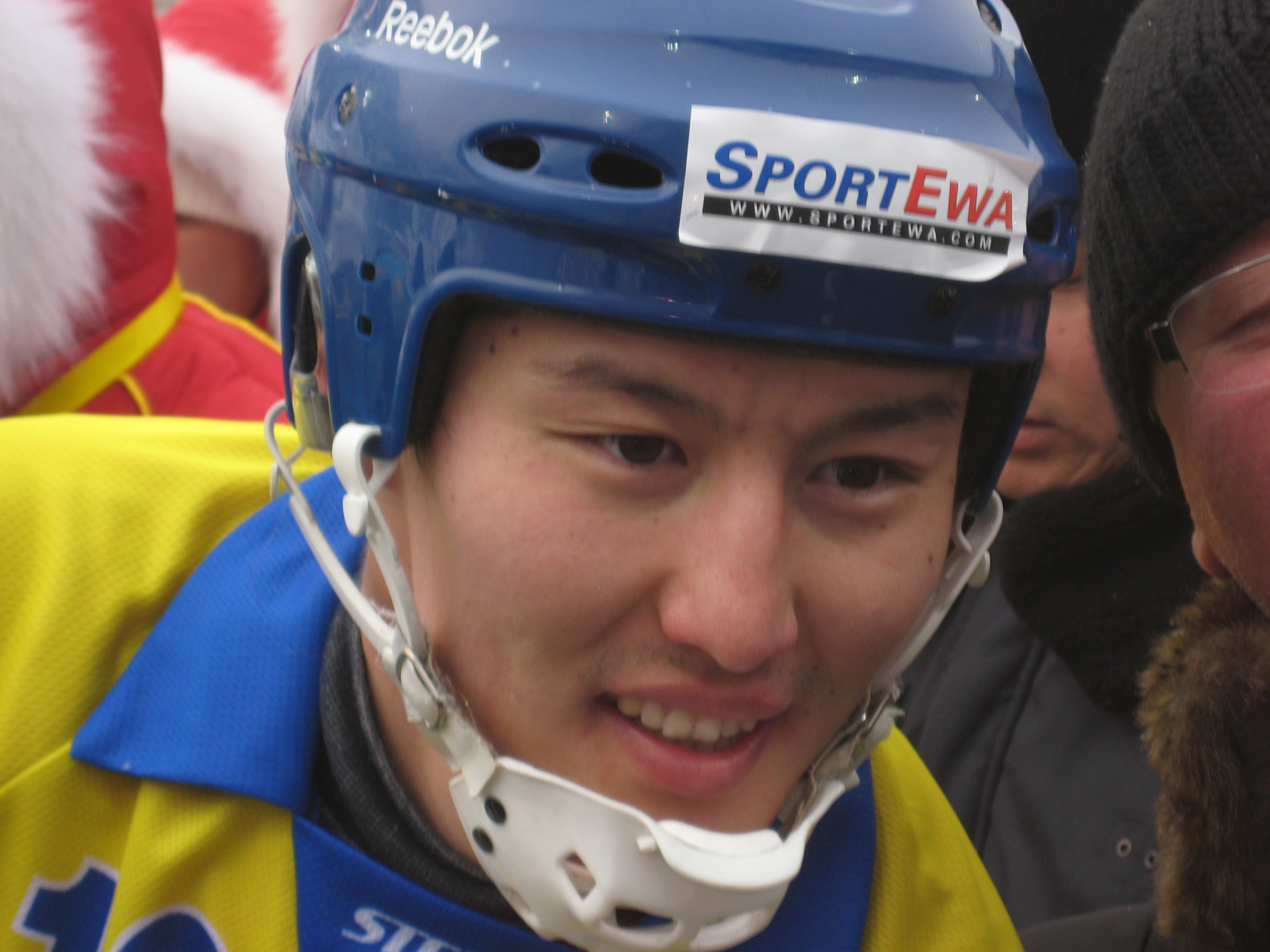
Team captain Rauan Isaliyev, 2012

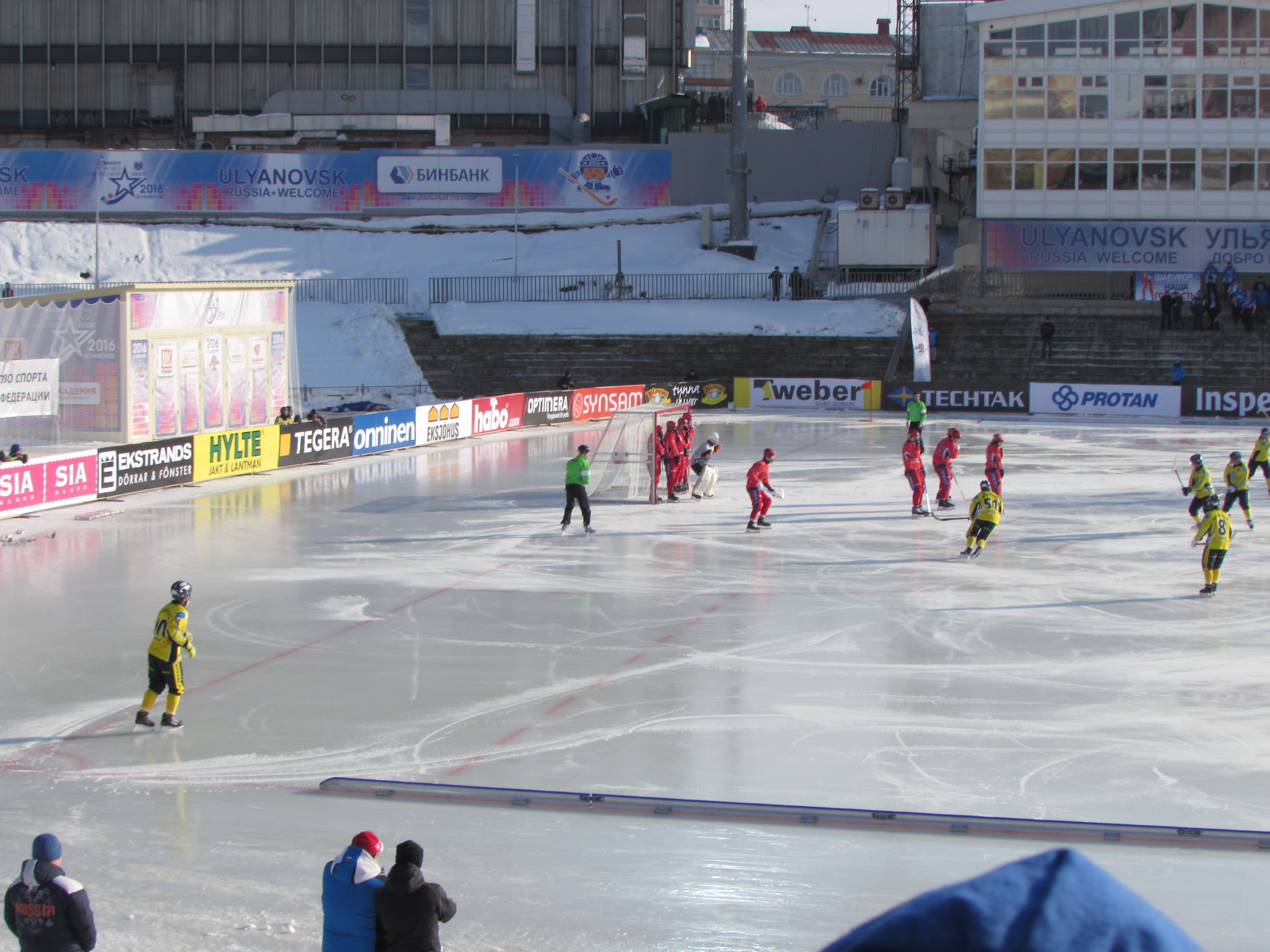
Their semifinal at the World Championship 2016 in Ulyanovsk, Russia

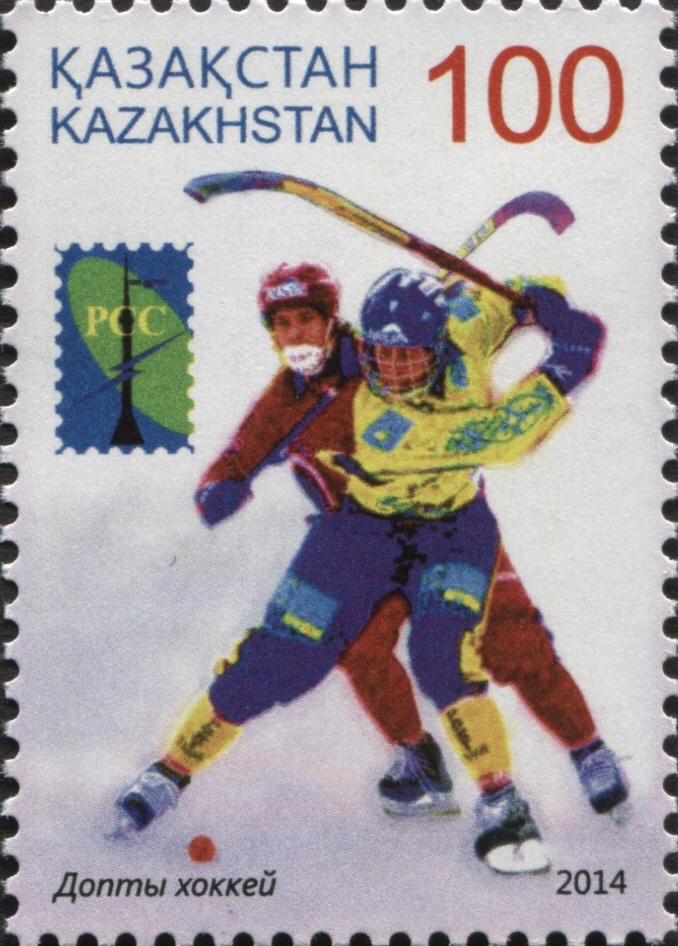
Bandy on the postage stamp of Kazakhstan, 2014

The Kazakh national bandy team has been representing Kazakhstan in the Bandy World Championships since 1995. Kazakhstan finished third in 2003, 2005, 2012, 2013, 2014 and 2015. In 2011 and 2012 they lost the semifinals after extra-time. In 2025 they will, contrary to plan, not participate, because the responsible ministry declined to provide financial support.

Kazakhstan won the 2011 Asian Winter Games.

The participation in the rink bandy tournament of the first CIS festival for national sports and games in 2017, Фестиваль национальных видов спорта и игр государств — участников Содружества Независимых Государств, resulted in third place.

== World Championship record ==
Tournament	Final standing	M	W	D	L	GF	GA	GD
1957-1991	part of Soviet Union	part of Soviet Union						
Norway 1993	DNE	DNE						
USA 1995	Finished in 4th place	6	4	0	2	55	19	+36
Sweden 1997	Finished in 4th place	7	1	1	5	30	63	-33
Russia 1999	Finished in 5th place	6	2	0	4	16	41	-25
Finland and Sweden 2001	Finished in 4th place	8	4	0	4	70	55	+15
Russia 2003	Bronze	6	2	0	4	17	34	-17
Sweden 2004	Finished in 4th place	6	1	1	4	21	46	-25
Russia 2005	Bronze	7	3	1	3	43	38	+5
Sweden 2006	Finished in 4th place	7	2	0	5	38	70	-32
Russia 2007	Finished in 4th place	7	2	1	4	40	57	-17
Russia 2008	Finished in 4th place	7	2	1	4	25	53	-28
Sweden 2009	Finished in 4th place	7	2	0	5	28	47	-19
Russia 2010	Finished in 4th place	7	2	0	5	34	59	-25
Russia 2011	Finished in 4th place	7	2	0	5	27	40	-13
Kazakhstan 2012	Bronze	7	4	1	2	54	34	+20
Sweden and Norway 2013	Bronze	7	4	0	3	46	31	+15
Russia 2014	Bronze	6	3	0	3	29	34	-5
Russia 2015	Bronze	6	2	1	3	42	50	-8
Russia 2016	Finished in 4th place	6	2	0	4	27	47	-20
Sweden 2017	Finished in 5th place	5	1	0	4	23	31	-8
Russia 2018	Finished in 4th place	6	4	0	2	74	17	+57
Sweden 2019	Finished in 4th place	6	1	0	5	9	82	-73
Russia 2020	Cancelled	Cancelled						
Russia 2022	Cancelled	Cancelled						
Sweden 2023	Finished in 4th place	5	1	0	4	10	33	-23
Sweden 2025	Withdraw	Withdraw						
Total	22/40	142	51	7	84	758	978	-220

3rd: 6 Time

4th: 14 Time

5th: 2 Time

2025 Bandy World Championship DID NOT ENTER

== Current squad ==
Kazakh squad at the 2019 World Championship in Vänersborg, Sweden.

Pos.	Age	Name	Club
GK	1	Vyacheslav Gorchakov	(Russia) Sibselmash Novosibirsk
GK	33	Berzhan Akhmetzhanov	(Russia) Dynamo Moscow
DF	5	Bolat Mukhit	(Russia) Volga Ulyanovsk
DF	7	Yelaman Alipkaliyev	(Russia) Start Nizhny Novgorod
DF	8	Andrey Guchshin	(Russia) Sibselmash Novosibirsk
MF	9	Samat Amanshin	(Russia) Baykal-Energiya
MF	14	Sultan Kadirzhanov	(Russia) Zorky Krasnogorsk
MF	11	Kuanish Temiralin	(Kazakhstan) Akzhaiyk
MF	17	Petr Gribanov	(Russia) Baykal-Energiya
MF	2	Pavel Chebakov	(Russia) SKA-Neftyanik
MF	25	Evgenii Shadrin	(Russia) Rodina Kirov
MF	22	Ilya Glukhov	(Russia) Sibselmash Novosibirsk
FW	20	Azat Bekturgan	(Russia) Start Nizhny Novgorod
FW	10	Rauan Isaliyev	(Russia) Sibselmash Novosibirsk
FW	19	Artem Vshivkov	(Russia) Baykal-Energiya Irkutsk
FW	18	Iskander Nugmanov	(Kazakhstan) Akzhaiyk
FW	95	Maxim Utebaliyev	(Russia) SKA-Neftyanik
