= Traktor Minsk =

Bandy club in Minsk, Belarus

Traktor Minsk (Трактор, Belarusian: Трактар, romanized: Traktar Minsk) is a bandy club in Minsk, Belarus. It has provided players for the Belarus national bandy team.
