= 2008 Bandy World Championship =

XXVIIIth Bandy World Championship

Tournament details
- Host country: Russia
- City: Moscow
- Venue: 1
- Dates: 2008
- Teams: 13

Final positions
- Champions: Russia
- Runners-up: Sweden
- Third place: Finland
- Fourth place: Kazakhstan

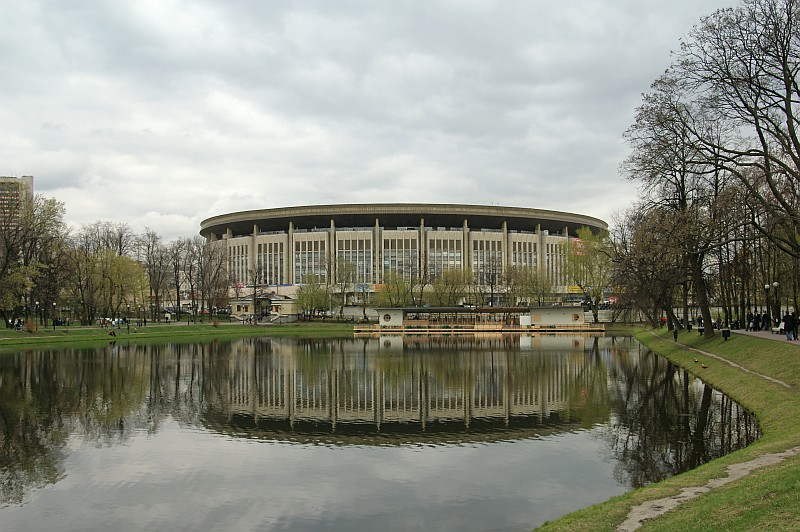
The Moscow Olympic Stadium was the venue of the competition.

The 2008 Bandy World Championship for men was played at the Olympic Stadium in Moscow, Russia on 27 January–3 February 2008. A record 13 teams competed to be the champions. Russia defeated Sweden in the final.

== Group stage ==
=== Group A ===
Team	Pld	W	D	L	GF	GA	GD	Pts
Sweden	5	5	0	0	55	14	+41	10
Russia	5	4	0	1	59	14	+45	8
Finland	5	2	1	2	35	22	+13	5
Kazakhstan	5	2	1	2	22	38	−16	5
Norway	5	1	0	4	18	55	−37	2
Belarus	5	0	0	5	13	59	−46	0

=== Group B ===
Team	Pld	W	D	L	GF	GA	GD	Pts
United States	6	6	0	0	65	3	+62	12
Canada	6	5	0	1	33	9	+24	10
Latvia	6	3	1	2	22	28	−6	5
Estonia	6	1	3	2	14	20	−6	5
Netherlands	6	2	1	3	16	30	−14	5
Mongolia	6	1	0	5	10	41	−31	2
Hungary	6	0	1	5	9	38	−29	1

== Final four ==
The top four teams from Group A went on to a play-off to decide the world champion.

Semi-finals
2 February
Sweden	7
Kazakhstan	0
2 February
Russia	9
Finland	1

Final
3 February
Sweden	1
Russia	6
Third place
3 February
Finland	8
Kazakhstan	3

== Qualification game for next year's Group A ==
United States – Belarus 4–6 (1–3)

Belarus kept its place in Group A.
