= 2006 Bandy World Championship =

Tournament details
- Host country: Sweden
- City: Stockholm
- Venue(s): 2 (in 1 host city)
- Dates: 28 January – 5 February
- Teams: 12

Final positions
- Champions: Russia
- Runner-up: Sweden
- Third place: Finland
- Fourth place: Kazakhstan

Tournament statistics
- Games played: 37

The 2006 Bandy World Championship was held in Sweden 28 January-5 February. Men's national teams from 12 countries participated in the 2006 tournament: Belarus, Finland, Kazakhstan, Norway, Russia, Sweden (group A) and Canada, Estonia, Hungary, Mongolia, the Netherlands, the United States (group B).

== Bidding ==
In February 2004, Hälsingland expressed its interest for hosting the tournament, with the final game intended to be played inside the Edsbyn Arena to avoid being affected by weather conditions.

Dalarna, Gothenburg, Stockholm and Västerås also expressed interest in hosting the championship. On 27 November 2004, the Swedish Bandy Association announced that the tournament would be played either in Dalarna or in Stockholm. On 14 January 2005, it was announced that Stockholm would host the event.

== Group A ==
- (gold) Russia
- (silver) Sweden
- (bronze) Finland
- 4th Kazakhstan
- 5th Norway
- 6th Belarus

=== Premier tour ===
- 28 January

Sweden – Kazakhstan 14–1
Belarus – Finland 1–13
Russia – Norway 12–2

- 29 January

Sweden – Finland 4–5
Norway – Belarus 17–2
Russia – Kazakhstan 21–3

- 30 January

Sweden – Belarus 13–1
Kazakhstan – Norway 10–4

- 31 January

Russia – Finland 5–1

- 1 February

Finland – Norway 6–3
Kazakhstan – Belarus 14–4
Sweden – Russia 4–5

- 2 February

Sweden – Norway 6–2
Russia – Belarus 9–4
Finland – Kazakhstan 7–3

Pos	Team	Pld	W	D	L	GF	GA	GD	Pts
1	Russia	5	5	0	0	52	14	+38	10
2	Finland	5	4	0	1	32	16	+16	8
3	Sweden	5	3	0	2	41	14	+27	6
4	Kazakhstan	5	2	0	3	31	50	−19	4
5	Norway	5	1	0	4	28	36	−8	2
6	Belarus	5	0	0	5	12	66	−54	0

=== Final Tour ===
==== Semifinals ====
- 4 February

Russia – Kazakhstan 13–3
Sweden – Finland 3–1

==== Match for 3rd place ====
- 5 February

Kazakhstan – Finland 4–7

==== Final ====
- 5 February

Russia – Sweden 3–2

== Group B ==
Were played in Ekvallen in Gustavsberg, a bit outside Stockholm

- United States
- Canada
- Hungary
- Netherlands
- Mongolia
- Estonia

=== Premier tour ===
- February 1

Mongolia – Estonia 4–3
USA – Hungary 10–1
Netherlands – Canada 0–9
USA – Estonia 8–0
Hungary – Canada 0–3
Mongolia – Netherlands 0–3

- February 2

Mongolia – USA 0–14
Netherlands – Hungary 1–3
Estonia – Canada 0–4
USA – Netherlands 14–0
Hungary – Estonia 3–2
Canada – Mongolia 4–0

- February 3

Estonia – Netherlands 1–3
Hungary – Mongolia 3–0
Canada – USA 1–4

Pos	Team	Pld	W	D	L	GF	GA	GD	Pts
1	United States	5	5	0	0	50	2	+48	10
2	Canada	5	4	0	1	21	4	+17	8
3	Hungary	5	3	0	2	10	16	−6	6
4	Netherlands	5	2	0	3	7	27	−20	4
5	Mongolia	5	1	0	4	4	27	−23	2
6	Estonia	5	0	0	5	6	22	−16	0

=== Match for 4th Place ===
- February 4

Netherlands – Mongolia 4–3

=== Match for 2nd Place ===
- February 4

Canada – Hungary 5–0

=== A-group qualification match ===
- February 4

Belarus – USA 3–2
