= 2013 Bandy World Championship =

XXXIIIrd Bandy World Championship

Tournament details
- Host countries: Sweden; Norway
- Venue(s): 5 (in 5 host cities)
- Dates: 27 January–3 February
- Teams: 14

Final positions
- Champions: Russia (7th title)
- Runners-up: Sweden
- Third place: Kazakhstan
- Fourth place: Finland

Tournament statistics
- Scoring leader(s): Patrik Nilsson (21 goals)

Awards
- MVP: Sergey Lomanov, Jr.

The 2013 Bandy World Championship was an edition of the top annual event in international bandy, held between January 23 and February 3, 2013, in Norway and Sweden.

14 countries participated in the 2013 championships: Belarus, Finland, Kazakhstan, Norway, Russia, Sweden (group A), Canada, Estonia, Japan, Hungary, Latvia, the Netherlands, Ukraine and the United States (group B). The B-group Championship was played in Sapa Arena in Vetlanda. The B-Group games were only played 2x30 minutes.

== Venues ==
| Vänersborg | Gothenburg | Trollhättan | Oslo | Vetlanda |
| Arena Vänersborg; Capacity: 5,700 | Heden Arena; Capacity: 5,700 | Slättbergshallen; Capacity: 4,000 | Frogner stadion Capacity: 4,200 | Sapa Arena; Capacity: 2,200 |

== Participating teams ==
=== Division A ===
- Belarus
- Finland
- Kazakhstan
- Norway
- Russia
- Sweden

=== Division B ===
- Canada
- Estonia
- Hungary
- Japan
- Latvia
- Netherlands
- Ukraine
- United States

== Division A ==
=== Preliminary round ===
| Team | Pld | W | D | L | GF | GA | GD | Pts |
|---|---|---|---|---|---|---|---|---|
| Sweden | 5 | 5 | 0 | 0 | 59 | 11 | +48 | 15 |
| Russia | 5 | 4 | 0 | 1 | 57 | 15 | +42 | 12 |
| Kazakhstan | 5 | 3 | 0 | 2 | 38 | 20 | +18 | 9 |
| Finland | 5 | 2 | 0 | 3 | 41 | 23 | +18 | 6 |
| Norway | 5 | 1 | 0 | 4 | 8 | 44 | −36 | 3 |
| Belarus | 5 | 0 | 0 | 5 | 6 | 96 | −90 | 0 |

All times local (UTC+1)

27 January 2013
| Sweden | 5–3 | Finland |
| Norway | 5–2 | Belarus |
| Russia | 6–4 | Kazakhstan |
28 January 2013
| Finland | 21–2 | Belarus |
| Norway | 0–12 | Russia |
| Sweden | 9–2 | Kazakhstan |
29 January 2013
| Kazakhstan | 10–1 | Norway |
| Finland | 3–6 | Russia |
| Sweden | 28–1 | Belarus |
30 January 2013
| Finland | 4–8 | Kazakhstan |
| Russia | 28–1 | Belarus |
| Sweden | 10–0 | Norway |
31 January 2013
| Kazakhstan | 14–0 | Belarus |
| Norway | 2–10 | Finland |
| Sweden | 7–5 | Russia |

==== Match for fifth place ====
2 February 2013
| Norway | 11–0 | Belarus |

=== Knockout stage ===
Semi-finals
2 February -
Russia | 8
Kazakhstan | 2
2 February -
Sweden | 10
Finland | 2

Final
3 February -
Russia | 4
Sweden | 3
Third place
3 February -
Kazakhstan | 6
Finland | 3

==== Semi-finals ====
2 February 2013
| Russia | 8–2 | Kazakhstan |
| Sweden | 10–2 | Finland |

==== Match for third place ====
3 February 2013
| Kazakhstan | 6–3 | Finland |

==== Final ====
3 February 2013
| Russia | 4–3 | Sweden |

=== Final standings ===
| 1. | Russia |
| 2. | Sweden |
| 3. | Kazakhstan |
| 4. | Finland |
| 5. | Norway |
| 6. | Belarus |

=== Statistics ===
==== Goalscorers ====
21 goals

- (Sweden) Patrik Nilsson

16 goals

- (Russia) Igor Larionov

12 goals

- (Sweden) Daniel Andersson
- (Kazakhstan) Vyacheslav Bronnikov
- (Russia) Yevgeny Ivanushkin

10 goals

- (Finland) Sami Laakkonen
- (Russia) Pavel Ryazantsev

9 goals

- (Kazakhstan) Sergey Pochkunov

8 goals

- (Sweden) Johan Esplund
- (Sweden) Johan Löfstedt

== Division B ==
=== Group 1 ===
Note - Matches were of 60 minutes duration rather than the standard 90 minutes in Group A.

| Team | Pld | W | D | L | GF | GA | GD | Pts |
|---|---|---|---|---|---|---|---|---|
| United States | 3 | 3 | 0 | 0 | 35 | 1 | +34 | 6 |
| Canada | 3 | 2 | 0 | 1 | 14 | 16 | −2 | 4 |
| Hungary | 3 | 1 | 0 | 2 | 11 | 19 | −8 | 2 |
| Latvia | 3 | 0 | 0 | 3 | 4 | 28 | −24 | 0 |

All times local (UTC+1)

23 January 2013
| United States | 10–1 | Canada |
24 January 2013
| Canada | 6–3 | Latvia |
| Hungary | 0–11 | United States |
| Latvia | 0–14 | United States |
| Canada | 7–3 | Hungary |
25 January 2013
| Hungary | 8–1 | Latvia |

=== Group 2 ===
Note - Matches were of 60 minutes duration rather than the standard 90 minutes in Group A.

| Team | Pld | W | D | L | GF | GA | GD | Pts |
|---|---|---|---|---|---|---|---|---|
| Estonia | 3 | 3 | 0 | 0 | 22 | 8 | +14 | 6 |
| Netherlands | 3 | 2 | 0 | 1 | 10 | 11 | −1 | 4 |
| Japan | 3 | 1 | 0 | 2 | 10 | 19 | −9 | 2 |
| Ukraine | 3 | 0 | 0 | 3 | 12 | 26 | −14 | 0 |

All times local (UTC+1)

24 January 2013
| Estonia | 13–6 | Ukraine |
| Japan | 2–3 | Netherlands |
| Ukraine | 3–5 | Netherlands |
| Estonia | 3–0 | Japan |
25 January 2013
| Japan | 8–5 | Ukraine |
| Netherlands | 2–6 | Estonia |

=== Knockout phase ===
Quarterfinals
A4 | Latvia | 4
B1 | Estonia | 1
A3 | Hungary | 7
B2 | Netherlands | 1

Semifinals
A1 | United States | 8
A4 | Latvia | 1
A2 | Canada | 8
A3 | Hungary | 1

Final
A1 | United States | 4
A2 | Canada | 2
Third place
A4 | Latvia | 3
A3 | Hungary | 2

=== Final tour ===
==== Match for seventh place ====
25 January 2013
| Japan | 6–5 | Ukraine |
26 January 2013
| Japan | 3–1 | Ukraine |

==== Quarterfinals ====
25 January 2013
| Hungary | 7–1 | Netherlands |
| Latvia | 4–1 | Estonia |

==== Semifinals ====
26 January 2013
| United States | 8–1 | Latvia |
| Canada | 8–1 | Hungary |

==== Match for fifth place ====
26 January 2013
| Netherlands | 1–2 | Estonia |

==== Match for third place ====
26 January 2013
| Latvia | 3–2 | Hungary |

==== Final ====
26 January 2013
| United States | 4–2 | Canada |

=== Final standings ===
| 1. | United States |
| 2. | Canada |
| 3. | Latvia |
| 4. | Hungary |
| 5. | Estonia |
| 6. | Netherlands |
| 7. | Japan |
| 8. | Ukraine |

The USA will replace Belarus in group A next year.
