= 1991 Bandy World Championship =

17th Bandy World Championship

Tournament details
- Host country: Finland
- Dates: 17–24 March
- Teams: 8

Final positions
- Champions: Soviet Union (14th title)
- Runners-up: Sweden
- Third place: Finland
- Fourth place: Norway

Tournament statistics
- Games played: 19
- Goals scored: 163 (8.58 per game)

The 1991 Bandy World Championship was contested by eight men's bandy playing nations in Finland from 17 to 24 March 1991. Canada, Hungary and the Netherlands made their championship debuts. The Soviet Union became champions in what would be its last tournament; less than a year later, the Soviet Union was dissolved and was briefly replaced in international bandy by the Commonwealth of Independent States, and then permanently by Russia. The final game was played at Oulunkylä Ice Rink in Helsinki.

== Group A ==
- Soviet Union
- Sweden
- Finland
- Norway

=== Premier tour ===
- 17 March

Sweden v Finland 10–4
Soviet Union v Norway 12–0

- 18 March

Finland v Norway 11–2
Soviet Union v Sweden 3–4

- 20 March

Sweden v Norway 6–1
Soviet Union v Finland 1–2

Pos	Team	Pld	W	D	L	GF	GA	GD	Pts	Qualification
1	Sweden	3	3	0	0	20	8	+12	6	Semifinals
2	Finland	3	2	0	1	17	13	+4	4	Semifinals
3	Soviet Union	3	1	0	2	16	6	+10	2	Semifinals
4	Norway	3	0	0	3	3	29	−26	0	Quarterfinal

== Group B ==
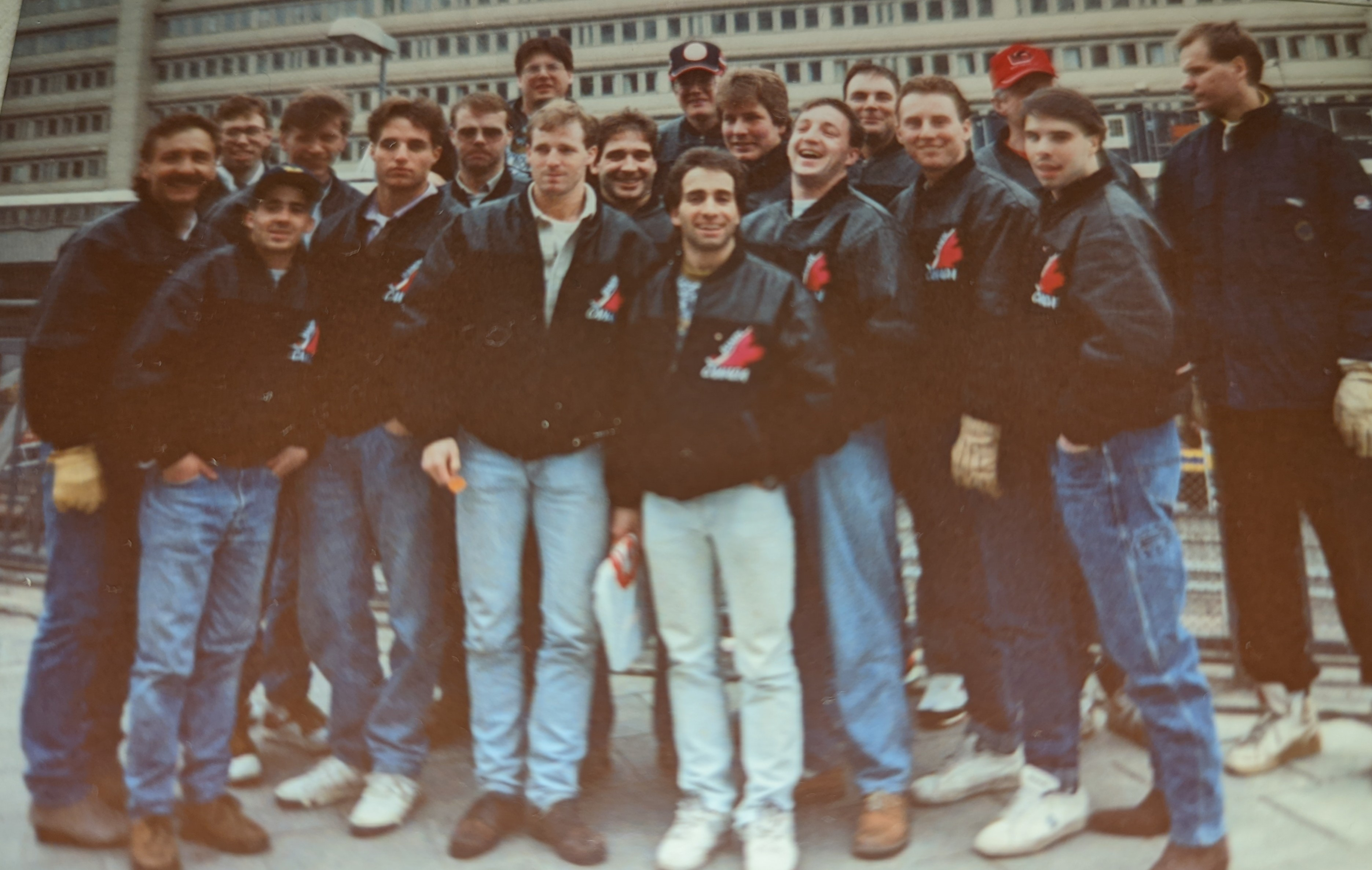
Team Canada's debut at the World Championships in Finland, 1991

- United States
- Canada
- Hungary
- Netherlands

=== Premier tour ===
- 17 March

USA v Canada 10–0
Hungary v Netherlands 3–2

- 18 March

Canada v Netherlands 8–0
USA v Hungary 20–0

- 20 March

USA v Netherlands 8–1
Canada v Hungary 7–1

Pos	Team	Pld	W	D	L	GF	GA	GD	Pts	Qualification
1	United States	3	3	0	0	38	1	+37	6	Quarterfinal
2	Canada	3	2	0	1	15	11	+4	4	
3	Hungary	3	1	0	2	4	29	−25	2	
4	Netherlands	3	0	0	3	3	19	−16	0	

== Final Tour ==
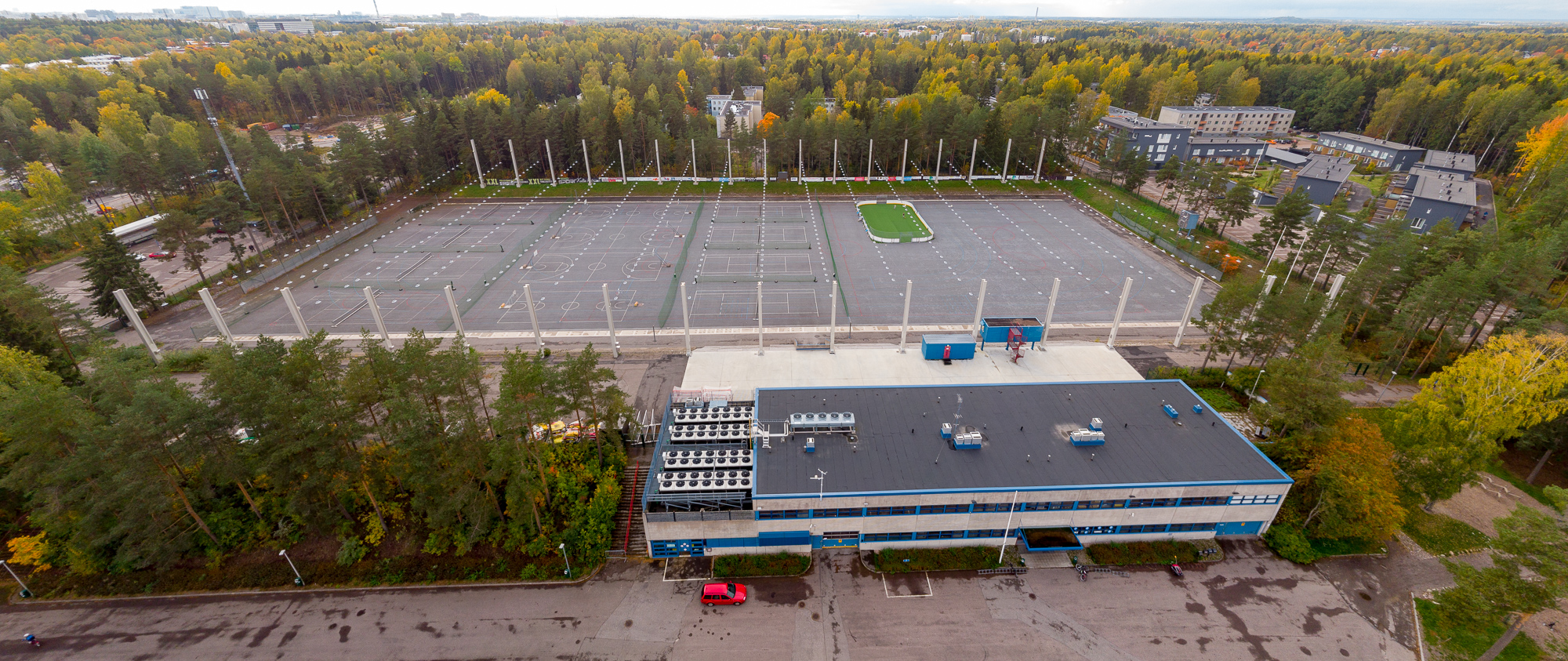
Oulunkylä Ice Rink in Helsinki

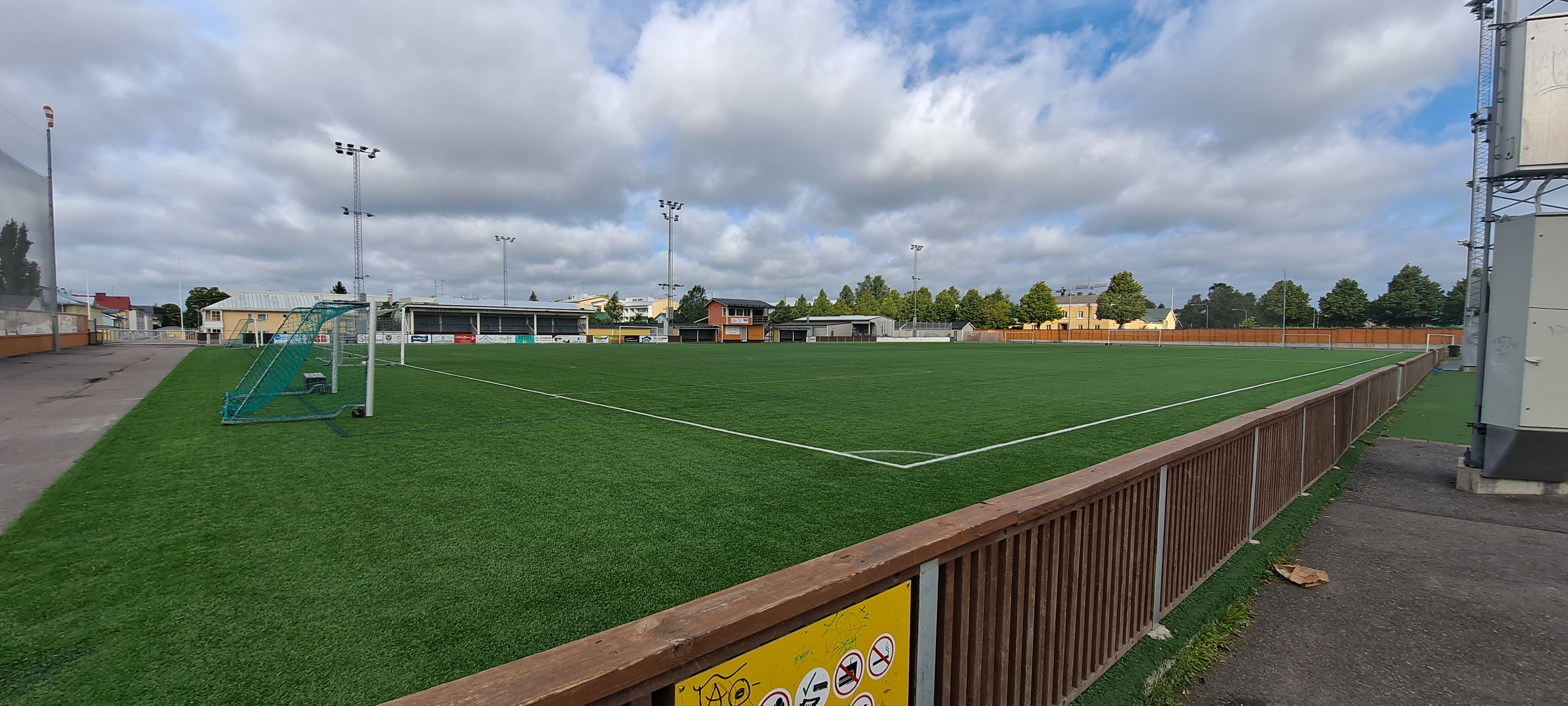
Porvoon pallokenttä in Porvoo

=== Quarterfinal ===
- 21 March

Norway v USA 2–1

==== Semifinals ====
- 22 March

Soviet Union v Finland 3–2
Sweden v Norway 6–0

=== Match for 7th place ===
- 23 March

Hungary v Netherlands 1–4

=== Match for 5th place ===
- 23 March

USA v Canada 13–0

==== Match for 3rd place ====
- 24 March

Finland v Norway 8–0

==== Final ====
- 24 March

Sweden v Soviet Union 3–4
