= 1997 Bandy World Championship =

20th Bandy World Championship

Tournament details
- Host country: Sweden
- Dates: 1–9 February
- Teams: 9

Final positions
- Champions: Sweden (6th title)
- Runners-up: Russia
- Third place: Finland
- Fourth place: Kazakhstan

Tournament statistics
- Games played: 25
- Goals scored: 280 (11.2 per game)

The 1997 Bandy World Championship was contested between 9 men's bandy playing nations. The championship was played in Sweden from 1 to 9 February 1997. The Netherlands participated again, after having skipped the tournament for the last couple of editions. Sweden won the championship.

The ball for the first game of the championship was ceremonially handed over by H.M. King Carl XVI Gustaf of Sweden.

== Group A ==
- Sweden
- Russia
- Finland
- Kazakhstan
- Norway

=== Premier tour ===
- 1 February

Finland v Sweden 3–11
Kazakhstan v Russia 6–13

- 2 February

Kazakhstan v Finland 2–7
Sweden v Norway 5–2

- 3 February

Russia v Finland 6–2
Norway v Kazakhstan 7–7

- 4 February

Norway v Russia 3–3
Sweden v Kazakhstan 15–4

- 5 February

Norway v Finland 4–5
Russia v Sweden 7–5

| Pos | Team | Pld | W | D | L | GF | GA | GD | Pts | Qualification |
|---|---|---|---|---|---|---|---|---|---|---|
| 1 | Russia | 4 | 3 | 1 | 0 | 29 | 16 | +13 | 7 | Semifinals |
| 2 | Sweden | 4 | 3 | 0 | 1 | 36 | 16 | +20 | 6 | Semifinals |
| 3 | Finland | 4 | 2 | 0 | 2 | 17 | 23 | −6 | 4 | Quarterfinals |
| 4 | Norway | 4 | 0 | 2 | 2 | 16 | 20 | −4 | 2 | Quarterfinals |
| 5 | Kazakhstan | 4 | 0 | 1 | 3 | 19 | 42 | −23 | 1 | Quarterfinals |

== Group B ==
- United States
- Canada
- Hungary
- Netherlands

=== Premier tour ===
- 2 February

Hungary v USA 0–12
Canada v Netherlands 9–0

- 4 February

Hungary v Canada 4–10
Netherlands v USA 1–13

- 5 February

Hungary v Netherlands 9–3
Canada v USA 2–5

| Pos | Team | Pld | W | D | L | GF | GA | GD | Pts | Qualification |
|---|---|---|---|---|---|---|---|---|---|---|
| 1 | United States | 3 | 3 | 0 | 0 | 30 | 3 | +27 | 6 | Quarterfinals |
| 2 | Canada | 3 | 2 | 0 | 1 | 21 | 9 | +12 | 4 | Match for 6th place |
| 3 | Hungary | 3 | 1 | 0 | 2 | 13 | 25 | −12 | 2 | Match for 8th place |
| 4 | Netherlands | 3 | 0 | 0 | 3 | 4 | 31 | −27 | 0 | Match for 8th place |

== Final tour ==
=== Quarterfinals ===
- 7 February

Norway v Kazakhstan 2–5
USA v Finland 0–13

=== Match for 5th place ===
- 8 February

Norway v USA 7–1

=== Match for 8th place ===
- 8 February

Hungary v Netherlands 5–3

=== Semifinals ===
- 8 February

Russia v Kazakhstan 12–3
Sweden v Finland 8–5

=== Match for 6th place ===
- 9 February

USA v Canada 5–1

=== Match for 3rd place ===
- 9 February

Finland v Kazakhstan 7–3

=== Final ===
- 9 February

Sweden v Russia 10–5
