= Estonian Bandy Association =

Sports governing body in Estonia

Estonian Bandy Association (Estonian: Eesti Jääpalliliit and find info web: "estbandy") is the governing body for the sport of bandy in Estonia. It has its office in Kurtna, Harju County and became a member of the Federation of International Bandy (FIB) in 2002. As of January 2022, it has three member clubs.

Estonia met Finland in six bandy friendlies in the interwar years, but after the Soviet era of 1940–1990, it took some time for Estonia to refound its own national team again.
