= Hungarian Bandy Federation =

Sports governing body in Hungary

The logo of the association.

Hungarian Bandy Federation (Magyar Bandy Szövetség) is the governing body for bandy in Hungary. The headquarters is in Budapest. The association was founded in 1988 as Magyar Jéglabda Szövetség and became a member in Federation of International Bandy in 1989.

== National team ==
- Hungary men's team
- Hungary women's team

== Link ==
- http://www.bandy.hu/
