= 1995 Bandy World Championship =

19th Bandy World Championship

Tournament details
- Host country: United States
- City: Roseville
- Venue: 1 (in 1 host city)
- Dates: 29 January – 5 February
- Teams: 8

Final positions
- Champions: Sweden (5th title)
- Runners-up: Russia
- Third place: Finland
- Fourth place: Kazakhstan

Tournament statistics
- Games played: 20
- Goals scored: 193 (9.65 per game)

The 1995 Bandy World Championship was contested by 8 men's Bandy playing nations. The championship was played at Guidant John Rose Minnesota Oval in Roseville, Minnesota, United States from 29 January to 5 February 1995. It was the first time that the men's championship was played in America. Kazakhstan made its championship debut, whereas the Netherlands choose not to take part in the tournament. Sweden became champions.

== Group A ==
- Sweden
- Russia
- Finland
- Norway

=== Premier tour ===
- 30 January

Russia v Finland 5–4
Sweden v Norway 9–1

- 31 January

Russia v Norway 10–2
Finland v Sweden 2–3

- 1 February

Norway v Finland 2–2 (6–7 after penalty shoot-out)
Russia v Sweden 6–2

| Pos | Team | Pld | W | D | L | GF | GA | GD | Pts | Qualification |
|---|---|---|---|---|---|---|---|---|---|---|
| 1 | Russia | 3 | 3 | 0 | 0 | 21 | 8 | +13 | 6 | Semifinals |
| 2 | Sweden | 3 | 2 | 0 | 1 | 14 | 9 | +5 | 4 | Semifinals |
| 3 | Finland | 3 | 0 | 1 | 2 | 8 | 10 | −2 | 1 | Quarterfinals |
| 4 | Norway | 3 | 0 | 1 | 2 | 5 | 21 | −16 | 1 | Quarterfinals |

== Group B ==
- Kazakhstan
- United States
- Canada
- Hungary

=== Premier tour ===
- 29 January

USA v Canada 4–1

- 30 January

Hungary v Kazakhstan 0–27

- 31 January

Canada v Kazakhstan 2–14
USA v Hungary 11–3

- 1 February

Canada v Hungary 4–4 (6–4 after penalty shoot-out)
USA v Kazakhstan 1–5

| Pos | Team | Pld | W | D | L | GF | GA | GD | Pts | Qualification |
|---|---|---|---|---|---|---|---|---|---|---|
| 1 | Kazakhstan | 3 | 3 | 0 | 0 | 46 | 3 | +43 | 6 | Quarterfinals |
| 2 | United States | 3 | 2 | 0 | 1 | 16 | 9 | +7 | 4 | Quarterfinals |
| 3 | Canada | 3 | 0 | 1 | 2 | 7 | 22 | −15 | 1 | Match for 7th place |
| 4 | Hungary | 3 | 0 | 1 | 2 | 7 | 42 | −35 | 1 | Match for 7th place |

== Final tour ==
=== Match for 7th place ===
- 5 February

Hungary v Canada 1–9

=== Quarter-finals ===
- 3 February

Norway v Kazakhstan 2–4
USA v Finland 1–6

=== Match for 5th place ===
- 5 February

Norway v USA 4–1

=== Semifinals ===
- 3 February

Russia v Kazakhstan 11–3
Sweden v Finland 8–4

=== Match for 3rd place ===
- 5 February

Finland v Kazakhstan 3–2

=== Final ===
- 5 February

Sweden v Russia 6–4
