= Latvia national bandy team =

Latvia
- Association: Latvia's Bandy Federation
- Head coach: (Latvia) Peteris Ostosovs
- Team colors

First international
- Latvia 5 – 0 Mongolia; Kemerovo, 28 January 2007

Biggest win
- Somalia 0 – 22 Latvia; Vänersborg, 24 January 2019

Biggest defeat
- Sweden 28 – 3 Latvia; Ulyanovsk, 4 February 2016

Bandy World Championship
- Appearances: 10 (first in 2007)
- Best result: 7th (2015)

The Latvian national bandy team took part in its first Bandy World Championship in 2007 as a replacement for Canada who had to withdraw from the competition. In 2014 they won Group B for the first time, following an increase from six to eight teams in Group A. Qualified for Group A in 2015, they were allowed to also play in Group B, after Canada had withdrawn for financial reasons and Ukraine for political ones. After winning that tournament, they were guaranteed Group A status also in 2016, even in case of last place in Group A. However, after losing all matches of the group stage, USA were beaten for the first time in the match for seventh place.

== Tournament participation ==
=== World Championships ===
- 2007 – 8th place (2nd in Group B)
- 2008 – 9th place (3rd in Group B)
- 2009 – 10th place (4th in Group B)
- 2010 – 8th place (2nd in Group B)
- 2011 – 9th place (3rd in Group B)
- 2012 – 10th place (4th in Group B)
- 2013 – 9th place (3rd in Group B)
- 2014 – 9th place (1st in Group B)
- 2015 – 7th place
- 2016 – 8th place
- 2017 – did not participate
- 2018 – did not participate
- 2019 – 13th place (5th in Group B)
