= Hungary national bandy team =

Hungary
- Association: Hungarian Bandy Association
- Head coach: (Sweden) Kristian Marosi
- Assistants: (Hungary) Gábor Nagy
- Captain: (Hungary) Dániel Bata
- Team colors

First international
- Sweden 10–1 Hungary (Novosibirsk, Russia; 26 January 1990)

Biggest win
- Hungary 10–1 Czech Republic (Trollhättan, Sweden; 27 January 2017)

Biggest defeat
- Sweden 34–0 Hungary (Pori, Finland; 12 January 2026)

Bandy World Championship
- Appearances: 20 (first in 1991)
- Best result: 5th (2025)

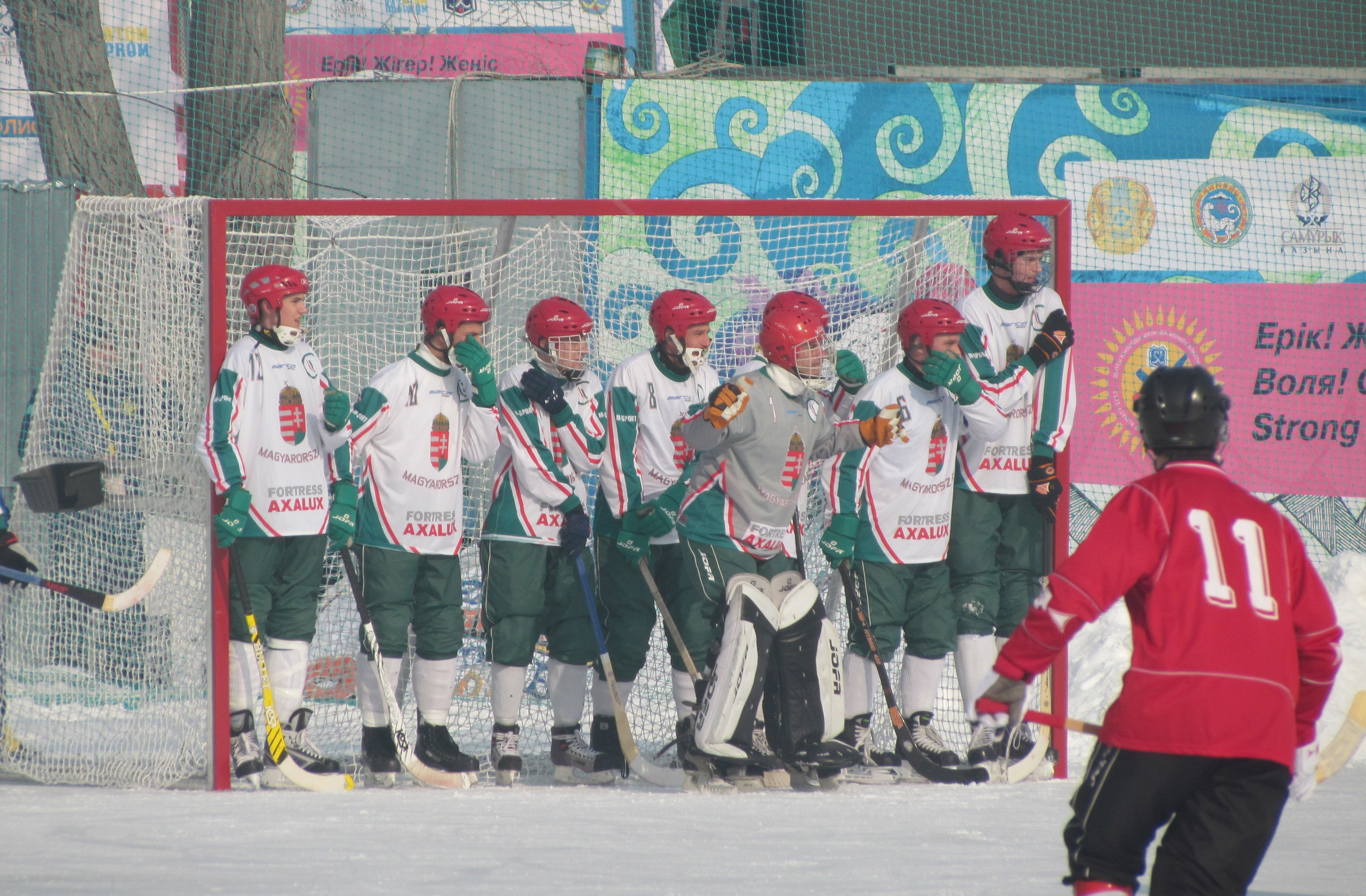
Hungary defending a corner against Canada at the 2012 Bandy World Championship.

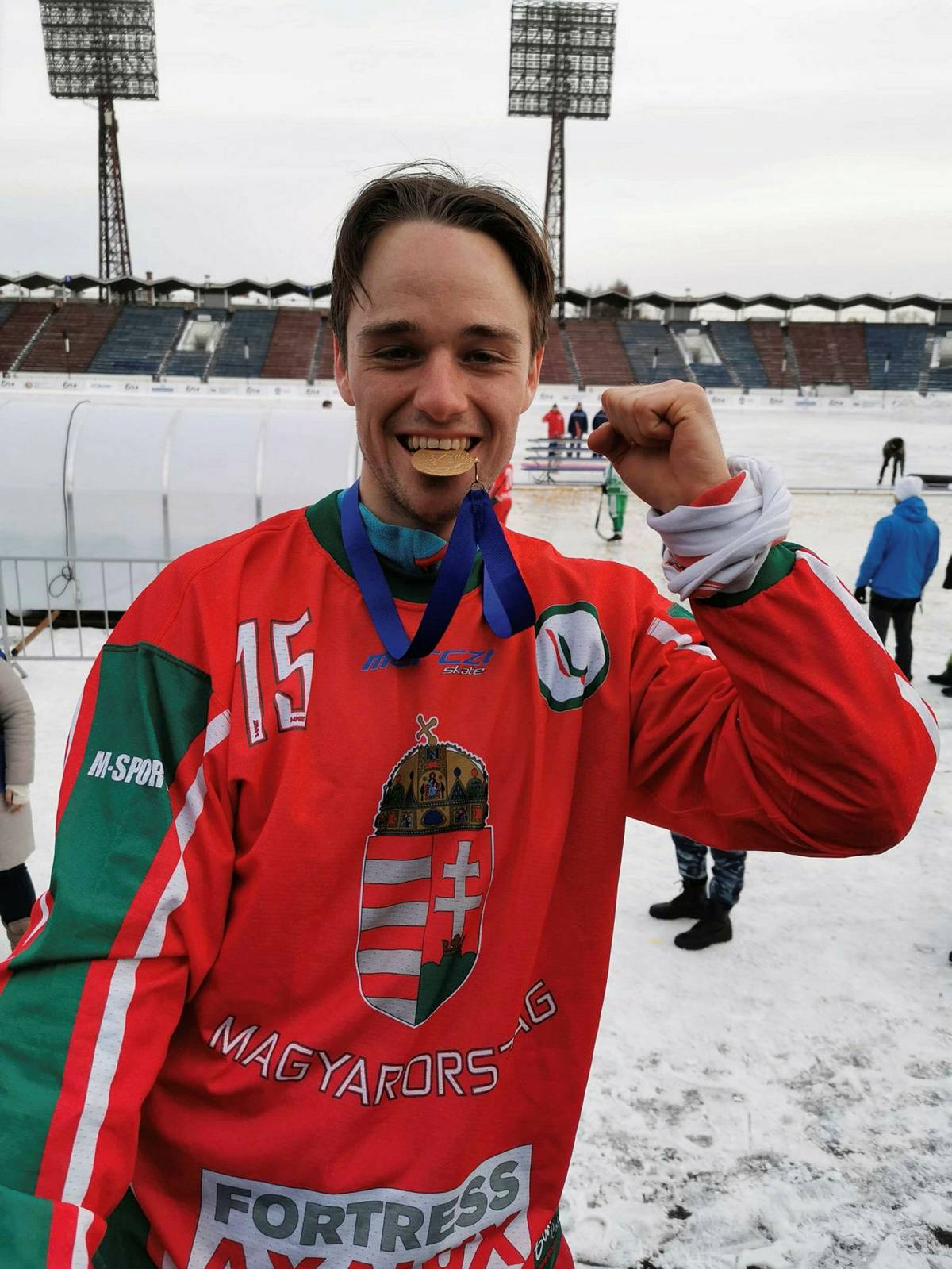
Hungarian player after winning the B-Division (2020)

Hungary national bandy team is competing for Hungary in the international bandy tournaments.

== History ==
Hungary national bandy team made its international debut in the Rossiya Tournament 1990 in Novosibirsk, Soviet Union.

Hungary made its world championship debut in 1991, but the team has so far not reached any medals. On 6 January 2014 Hungary came in second in a four nation tournament in Davos, a centenary celebration of the European Championship of 1913. The other teams were Netherlands, Czech Republic, and Germany.

Following the withdrawal by Canada, Hungary took its place in Division A at the 2018 WCS, marking the first time Hungary will compete in the elite division, after Division B was created. However, Hungary came in last in the division, was relegated, and has played in Division B since, but has qualified for Division A in 2022.

== Tournament participation ==
=== World Championships ===
- 1991 – 8th place
- 1993 – 7th place
- 1995 – 8th place
- 1997 – 8th place
- 2004 – 8th place (3rd in Group B)
- 2005 – 11th place (5th in Group B)
- 2006 – 9th place (3rd in Group B)
- 2007 – 10th place (4th in Group B)
- 2008 – 13th place (7th in Group B)
- 2009 – 13th place (7th in Group B)
- 2010 – 10th place (4th in Group B)
- 2011 – 10th place (4th in Group B)
- 2012 – 9th place (3rd in Group B)
- 2013 – 10th place (4th in Division B)
- 2014 – 11th place (3rd in Division B)
- 2015 – 10th place (3rd in Division B)
- 2016 – 10th place (2nd in Division B)
- 2017 – 10th place (2nd in Division B)
- 2018 – 8th place
- 2019 – 11th place (3rd in Division B)
- 2020 – 9th place (1st in Division B)
- 2023 – 6th place (1st in Division B)
- 2025 – 5th
- 2026 – 6th
