= 2004 Bandy World Championship =

Tournament details
- Host countries: Sweden; Hungary
- Dates: 1–8 February (A); 25–28 February (B)
- Teams: 11

Final positions
- Champions: Finland (1st title)
- Runners-up: Sweden
- Third place: Russia
- Fourth place: Kazakhstan

Tournament statistics
- Games played: 31
- Scoring leader(s): Ari Holopainen, Finland (10 points)

The 2004 Bandy World Championship was a competition among bandy playing nations. The men's tournament was played in Sweden from 1 to 8 February 2004 for Group A, while Group B was played at the City Park Ice Rink in Budapest, Hungary, from 25 to 28 February 2004. Finland won the championship for the first time. Eleven bandy playing countries participated in the 2004 championships: Finland, Kazakhstan, Norway, Russia, Sweden (Group A) and Belarus, Canada, Estonia, Hungary, Netherlands and United States (Group B).

Finland became world champions. For the first time ever (and, as of 2025, still the only time) the championship went to a team other than Soviet Union/Russia or Sweden.

== Group A ==
- Finland
- Sweden
- Russia
- Kazakhstan
- Norway

=== First round ===
- 1 February

Sweden v Kazakhstan 14–2
Russia v Norway 6–3

- 2 February

Kazakhstan v Russia 3–10
Sweden v Finland 7–1

- 3 February

Finland v Norway 5–3
Sweden v Russia 4–3

- 4 February

Kazakhstan v Norway 4–4
Russia v Finland 3–4

- 5 February

Finland v Kazakhstan 3–7
Sweden v Norway 6–6

Pos	Team	Pld	W	D	L	GF	GA	GD	Pts	Qualification
1	Sweden	4	3	1	0	31	12	+19	7	Semifinals
2	Russia	4	2	0	2	22	14	+8	4	Semifinals
3	Finland	4	2	0	2	13	20	−7	4	Semifinals
4	Kazakhstan	4	1	1	2	16	31	−15	3	Semifinals
5	Norway	4	0	2	2	16	21	−5	2	

=== Final round ===
==== Semifinals ====
- 7 February

Sweden v Kazakhstan 10–3
Russia v Finland 3–4

==== Match for 3rd place ====
- 8 February

Russia v Kazakhstan 5–2

==== Final ====
- 8 February

Sweden v Finland 4–5 (aet)

== Group B ==
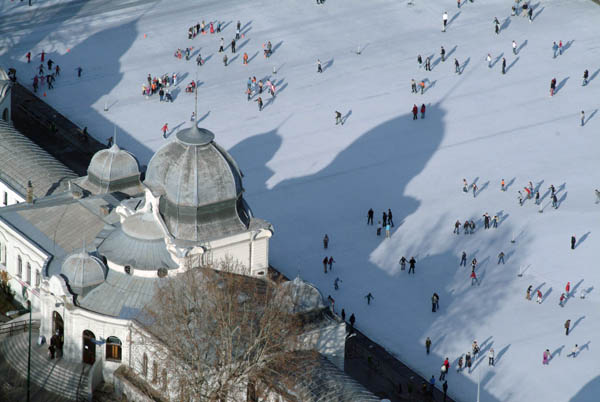
Group B was played in Budapest

- United States
- Belarus
- Hungary
- Canada
- Netherlands
- Estonia

=== First round ===
- 25 February

Canada v USA 3–4
Hungary v Estonia 2–3
Belarus v Netherlands 7–0
Estonia v Canada 2–6
Hungary v USA 1–10

- 26 February

Belarus v Estonia 2–1
Netherlands v USA 0–12
Belarus v Canada 3–2
Estonia v USA 0–10
Hungary v Netherlands 4–1

- 27 February

Hungary v Belarus 4–2
Netherlands v Canada 1–6
Belarus v USA 1–6
Netherlands v Estonia 0–6
Hungary v Canada 3–3

Pos	Team	Pld	W	D	L	GF	GA	GD	Pts	Qualification
1	United States	5	5	0	0	42	5	+37	10	Final
2	Belarus	5	3	0	2	15	13	+2	6	Final
3	Canada	5	2	1	2	20	13	+7	5	Match for 3rd place
4	Hungary	5	2	1	2	14	19	−5	5	Match for 3rd place
5	Estonia	5	2	0	3	12	20	−8	4	
6	Netherlands	5	0	0	5	2	35	−33	0	

=== Play-off matches ===
==== Match for 3rd place ====
- 28 February

Hungary v Canada 5–1

==== Final ====
- 28 February

USA v Belarus 7–0
