= 2012 Bandy World Championship =

Tournament details
- Host country: Kazakhstan
- Teams: 14

Final positions
- Champions: Sweden
- Runners-up: Russia
- Third place: Kazakhstan
- Fourth place: Finland

Tournament statistics
- Scoring leader(s): Yevgeny Ivanushkin (12 goals)

The 2012 Bandy World Championship was an edition of the top annual event in international bandy, held between January 29 and February 5, 2012, in Almaty, Kazakhstan. 14 countries participated in the 2012 championships: Finland, Kazakhstan, Norway, Russia, Sweden, the United States (group A), Belarus, Canada, Hungary, Latvia, and the Netherlands (group B), and Estonia, Japan, and Kyrgyzstan (group C). Group C was introduced, and 14 teams made the record number for Bandy World Championships. The qualifiers match between the team in the last place in Group A and the first team in Group B was not played. The United States, who finished sixth in Group A, in 2013 will play in group B, and Belarus, the winner of Group B, will play in 2013 in Group A. Estonia, the winner of Group C, will play in Group B in 2013. The team relegated to Group C was not the last of Group B, but Mongolia, because they withdrew late from the tournament.

Sweden, which were the 2010 champion but in 2011 only finished third, became the champion again. Russia, the defending champion, lost to Sweden in the finals. Kazakhstan took the bronze medal, for the third time in their history.

The semifinal match between Kazakhstan and Sweden, which Sweden won on penalties, ended in a controversy, since the Swedish player Daniel Mossberg was not listed in the paperwork submitted by Sweden before the match. Kazakhstan filed a protest. As the result, Sweden were fined, but the result was kept, and Sweden went on to the finals against Russia.

== Group A ==
=== Preliminary round ===
Team	Pld	W	D	L	GF	GA	GD	Pts
Russia	5	5	0	0	54	16	+38	10
Sweden	5	4	0	1	49	7	+42	8
Kazakhstan	5	3	0	2	40	25	+15	6
Finland	5	2	0	3	22	30	−8	4
Norway	5	1	0	4	10	47	−37	2
United States	5	0	0	5	10	60	−50	0

29 January 2012
Sweden	12–0	Finland
Russia	19–3	United States
Kazakhstan	10–1	Norway
30 January 2012
Russia	5–4	Finland
Sweden	11–0	Norway
Kazakhstan	13–3	United States
31 January 2012
Finland	7–1	United States
Russia	16–1	Norway
Kazakhstan	1–9	Sweden
1 February 2012
Finland	7–2	Norway
Sweden	15–0	United States
Kazakhstan	6–8	Russia
2 February 2012
Norway	6–3	United States
Kazakhstan	10–4	Finland
Russia	6–2	Sweden

=== Knockout phase ===
Semi-finals
4 February - Almaty
Russia	6
Finland	4
4 February - Almaty
Kazakhstan	4 (5)
Sweden	4 (6)

Final
5 February - Almaty
Russia	4
Sweden	5
Third place
5 February - Almaty
Kazakhstan	10
Finland	5

==== Semi-finals ====
4 February 2012
Russia	6–4	Finland
Kazakhstan	4–4 (5–6)	Sweden

==== Match for third place ====
5 February 2012
Kazakhstan	10–5	Finland

==== Final ====
5 February 2012
Russia	4–5	Sweden

== Group B ==
=== Preliminary round ===
Team	Pld	W	D	L	GF	GA	GD	Pts
Belarus	4	4	0	0	43	10	+33	8
Canada	4	3	0	1	35	10	+25	6
Hungary	4	2	0	2	15	27	−12	4
Netherlands	4	1	0	3	10	23	−13	2
Latvia	4	0	0	4	9	42	−33	0

30 January 2012
Netherlands	6–2	Latvia
Belarus	13–5	Hungary
31 January 2012
Hungary	4–2	Latvia
Canada	11–1	Netherlands
1 February 2012
Canada	11–1	Hungary
Belarus	19–3	Latvia
2 February 2012
Belarus	6–0	Canada
Hungary	5–1	Netherlands
3 February 2012
Belarus	5–2	Netherlands
Canada	13–2	Latvia

=== Final tour ===
==== Match for fourth place ====
4 February 2012
Latvia	2–1	Netherlands

==== Match for second place ====
4 February 2012
Canada	9–2	Hungary

== Group C ==
=== Preliminary round ===
Note - Matches were of 60 minutes duration rather than the standard 90 minutes in Groups A and B.'

Team	Pld	W	D	L	GF	GA	GD	Pts
Estonia	4	3	1	0	33	5	+28	7
Japan	4	2	1	1	25	8	+17	5
Kyrgyzstan	4	0	0	4	1	46	−45	0

30 January 2012
Estonia	6–2	Japan
Estonia	13–0	Kyrgyzstan
31 January 2012
Japan	13–0	Kyrgyzstan
Estonia	12–1	Kyrgyzstan
1 February 2012
Estonia	2–2	Japan
Japan	8–0	Kyrgyzstan

=== Final tour ===
==== Match for second place ====
4 February 2012
Japan	4–0	Kyrgyzstan

== Gallery ==
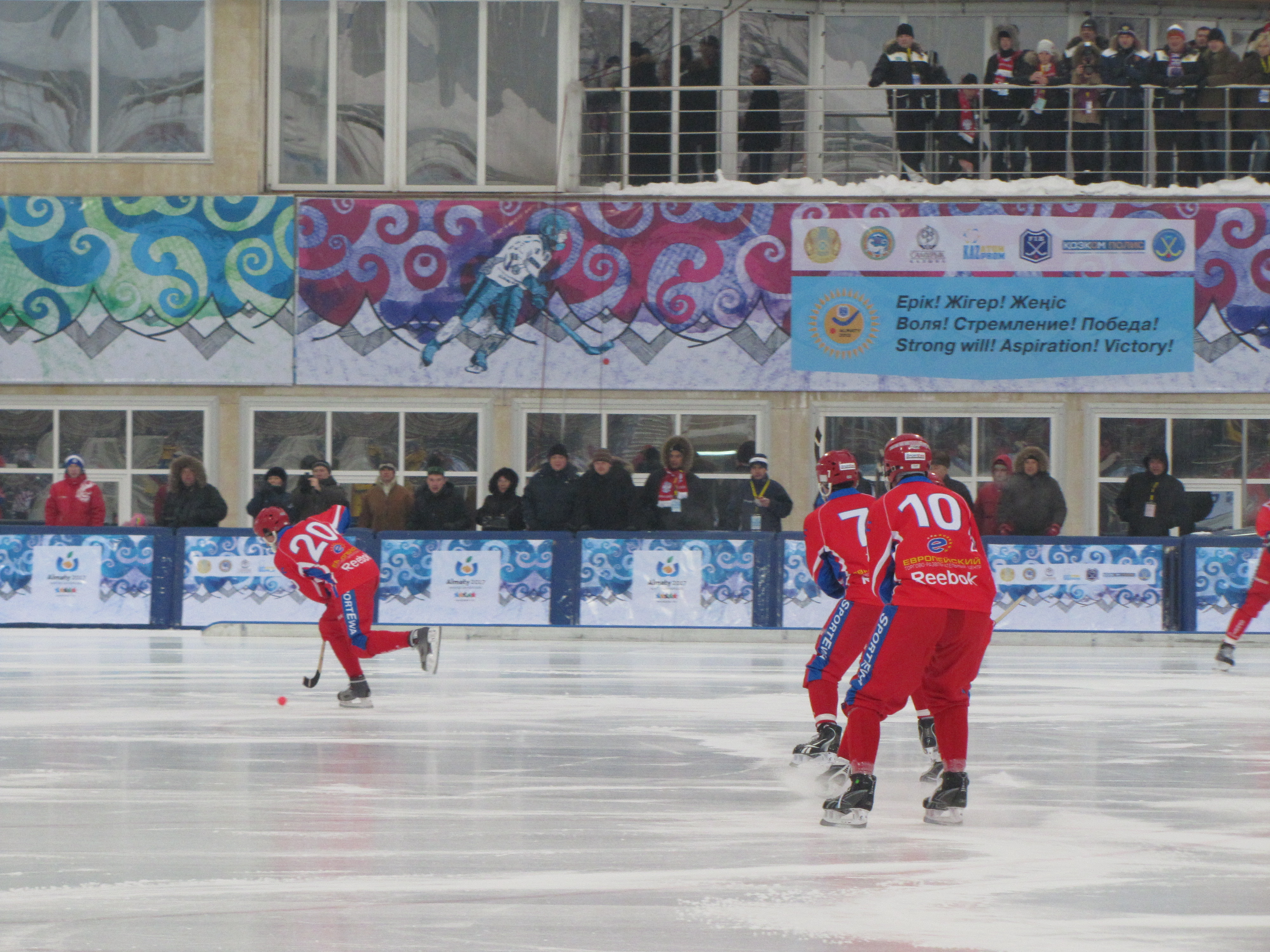
The final match between Russia (pictured) and Sweden.

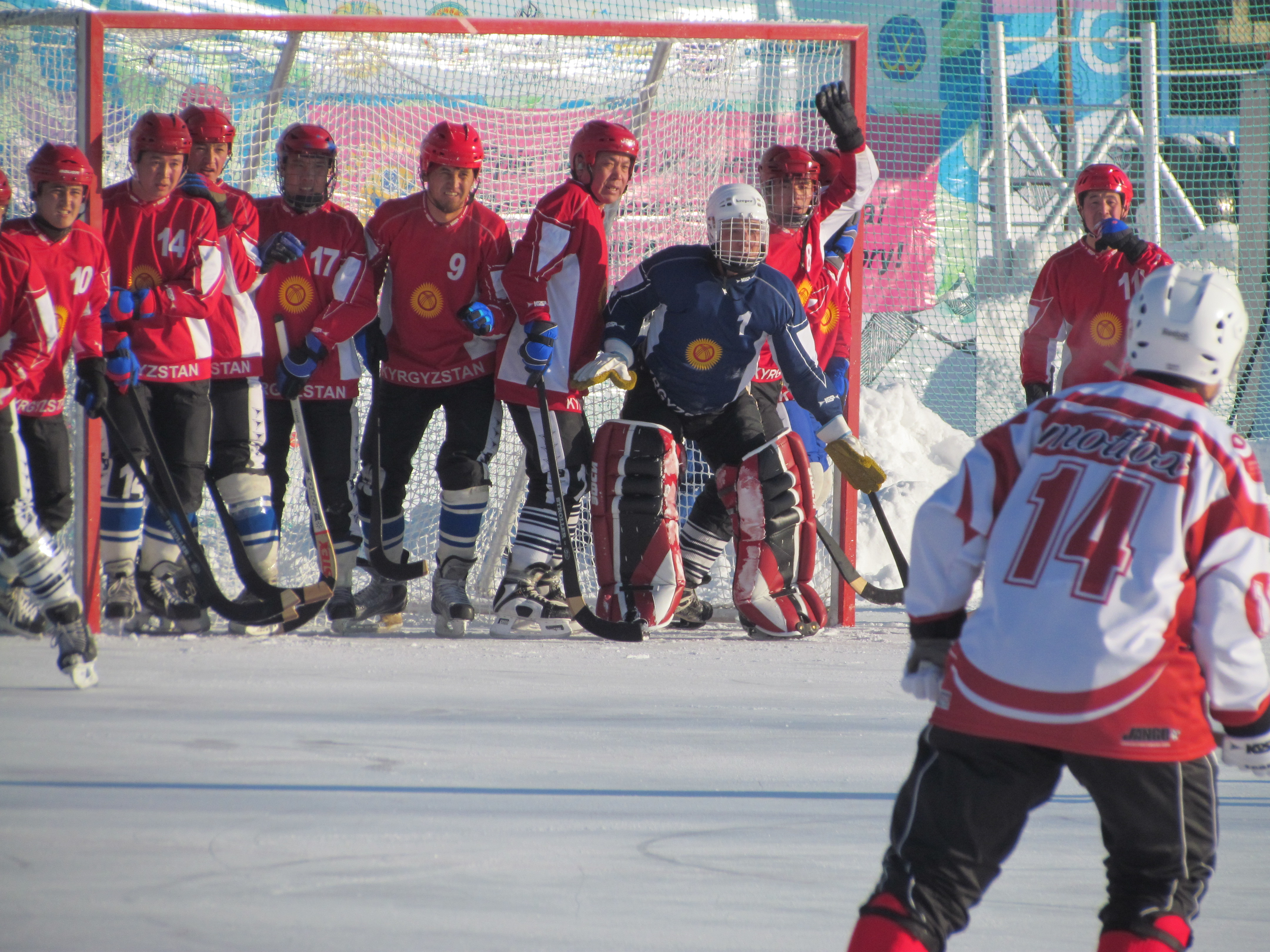
Japan and Kyrgyzstan

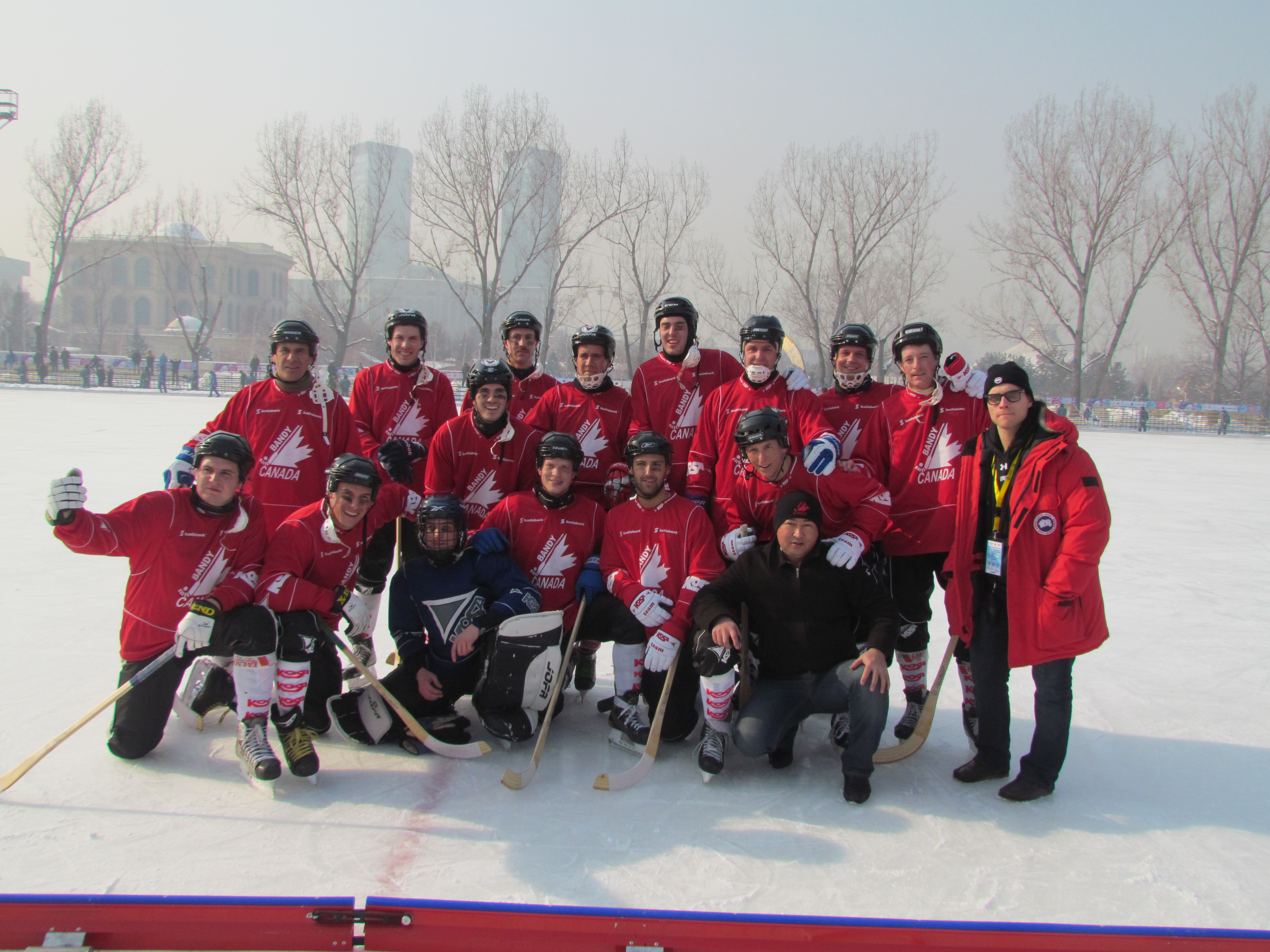
Canadian men's national bandy team, 2012 Bandy World Championship
