= 1993 Bandy World Championship =

18th Bandy World Championship

Tournament details
- Host country: Norway
- Dates: 2–7 February
- Teams: 8

Final positions
- Champions: Sweden (4th title)
- Runners-up: Russia
- Third place: Norway
- Fourth place: Finland

Tournament statistics
- Games played: 19
- Goals scored: 126 (6.63 per game)

The 1993 Bandy World Championship was contested by eight men's bandy playing nations. Russia made its debut, replacing the former Soviet Union. The championship was played in Norway, mostly in Vikingskipet Olympic Arena, from 2 to 7 February 1993. Sweden became champions. The group stages were played with 30 minute halves whereas the final tour games were played with 45 minute halves.

== Group A ==
- Sweden
- Russia
- Norway
- Finland

=== Premier tour ===
- 2 February

Sweden v Norway 6–1
Russia v Finland 1–0

- 3 February

Finland v Sweden 1–10
Russia v Norway 2–0

- 4 February

Norway v Finland 1–4
Russia v Sweden 1–2

Pos	Team	Pld	W	D	L	GF	GA	GD	Pts	Qualification
1	Sweden	3	3	0	0	18	3	+15	6	Semifinals
2	Russia	3	2	0	1	4	2	+2	4	Semifinals
3	Finland	3	1	0	2	5	12	−7	2	Semifinals
4	Norway	3	0	0	3	2	12	−10	0	Quarterfinal

== Group B ==
- United States
- Canada
- Hungary
- Netherlands

=== Premier tour ===
- 3 February

USA v Canada 8–0
Hungary v Netherlands 3–0
Canada v Netherlands 4–1
USA v Hungary 4–0

- 4 February

USA v Netherlands 9–1
Canada v Hungary 4–1

Pos	Team	Pld	W	D	L	GF	GA	GD	Pts	Qualification
1	United States	3	3	0	0	21	1	+20	6	Quarterfinal
2	Canada	3	2	0	1	8	9	−1	4	
3	Hungary	3	1	0	2	4	8	−4	2	
4	Netherlands	3	0	0	3	1	16	−15	0	

== Final Tour ==
=== Quarterfinal ===
- 5 February

Norway v USA 7–0

=== Semifinals ===
- 6 February

Russia v Finland 8–5
Sweden v Norway 6–3

=== Match for 7th place ===
- 6 February

Hungary v Netherlands 6–4

=== Match for 5th place ===
- 6 February

USA v Canada 5–3

=== Match for 3rd place ===
- 7 February

Finland v Norway 3–5

=== Final ===
- 7 February

Sweden v Russia 8–0
