= Estonia national bandy team =

Estonia
- Association: Estonian Bandy Association
- Head coach: (Sweden) Frank Lundin
- Team colors
Home colours	Away colours

First international
- Finland 22 – 0 Estonia; Helsinki, 17 January 1923

Biggest win
- Estonia 20 – 0 Somalia; Harbin, 31 January 2018

Biggest defeat
- Finland 22 – 0 Estonia; Helsinki, 17 January 1923

Bandy World Championship
- Appearances: 15 (first in 2003)
- Best result: 8th (2003)

The Estonian national bandy team competed for the first time during the first period of Estonian independence, in the interwar years 1918–1940. Estonia played six international friendlies against Finland between 1923 and 1934, losing them all.

Estonia got occupied by the Soviet Union in 1944 and regained its independence in 1991. The modern Estonian Bandy Association was founded in 2001 and joined the Federation of International Bandy in 2002.

The re-established national bandy team participated in the annual Bandy World Championship for the first time in 2003. Estonia won the Davos Cup in 2016 but was disqualified from the 2016 Bandy World Championship.

== World Championship record ==
Games	Finish
Russia 2003, Arkhangelsk	8th place
(Sweden) Hungary 2004, Budapest	Group B, 5th place
Russia 2005, Kazan	Group B, 4th place
Sweden 2006, a bit outside Stockholm	Group B, 6th place
Russia 2007, Kemerovo	Division B, 6th place
Russia 2008, Moscow	Group B, 4th place
Sweden 2009, Västerås	Division B, 2nd place
Russia 2010, Moscow	-
Russia 2011, Kazan	-
Kazakhstan 2012, Almaty	Group C, 1st place
Sweden and Norway 2013, Vänersborg / N/A	Division B, 5th place
Russia 2014, Irkutsk / Shelekhov	Division B, 2nd place
Russia 2015, Khabarovsk	Division B, 2nd place
Russia 2016, Ulyanovsk	Division B, DQ
Sweden 2017, Sandviken	Division B, 6th place
Russia and China 2018, Khabarovsk / Harbin	Division B, 3rd place
Sweden 2019, Vänersborg	Division B, 1st place
Russia 2020, Irkutsk	Division A
