= 2001 Bandy World Championship =

22nd Bandy World Championship

Tournament details
- Host countries: Finland; Sweden
- Dates: 24 March – 1 April
- Teams: 7

Final positions
- Champions: Russia
- Runners-up: Sweden
- Third place: Finland
- Fourth place: Kazakhstan

Tournament statistics
- Games played: 26

The 2001 Bandy World Championship for men was played in Haparanda, Sweden, and Oulu, Finland, on March 24–April 1, 2001. Seven teams contested the tournament. The main arena was Raksila Artificial Ice Rink Pakkalan kenttä. Russia became champions.

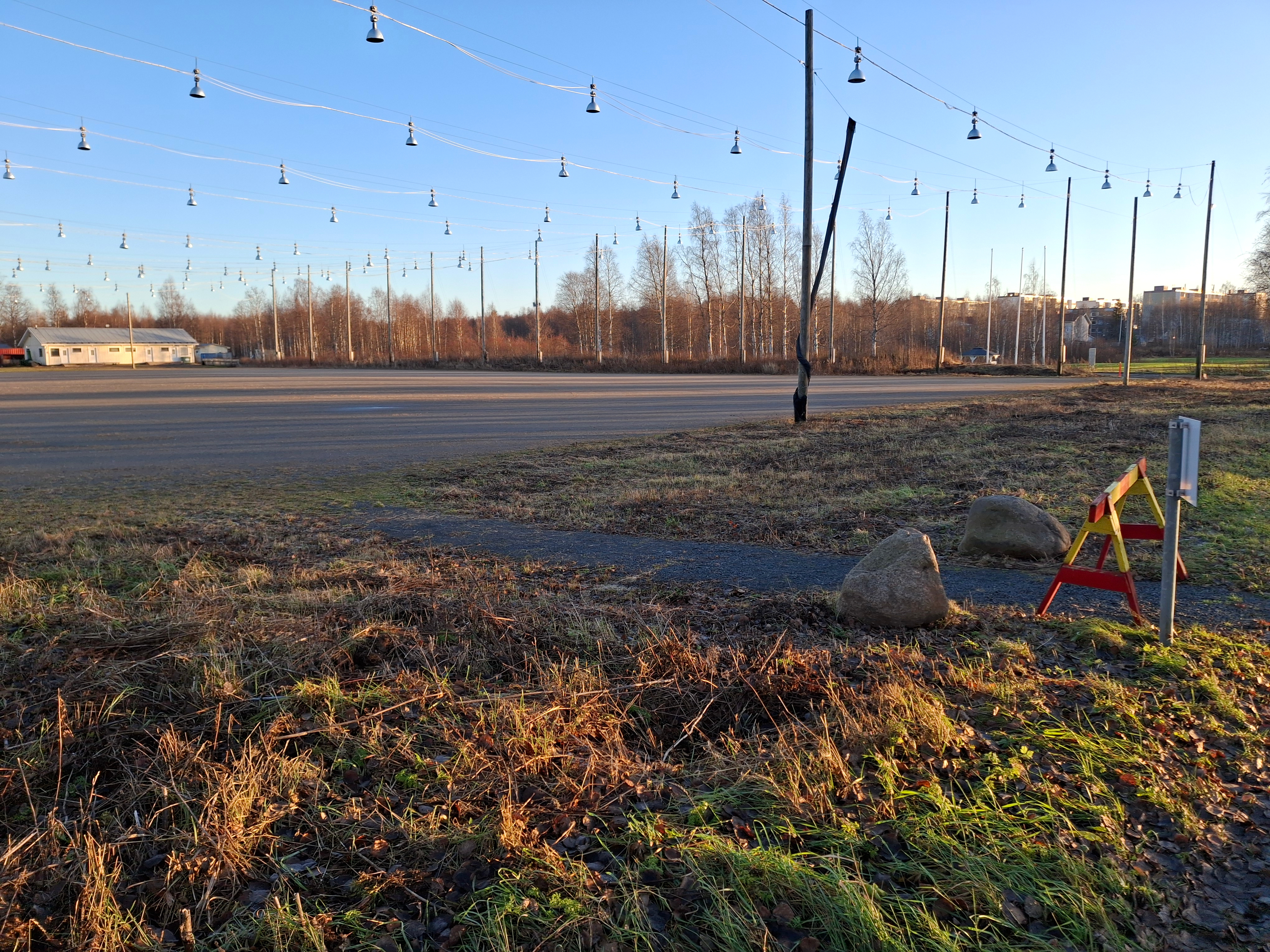
The bandy field in Tornio

== Group stage ==
Team	Pld	W	L	GF	GA	GD	Pts
Sweden	6	6	0	76	18	+58	12
Russia	6	5	1	63	16	+47	10
Kazakhstan	6	4	2	63	39	+24	8
Finland	6	3	3	57	29	+28	6
Norway	6	2	4	48	44	+4	4
United States	6	1	5	21	59	−38	2
Belarus	6	0	6	1	124	−123	0

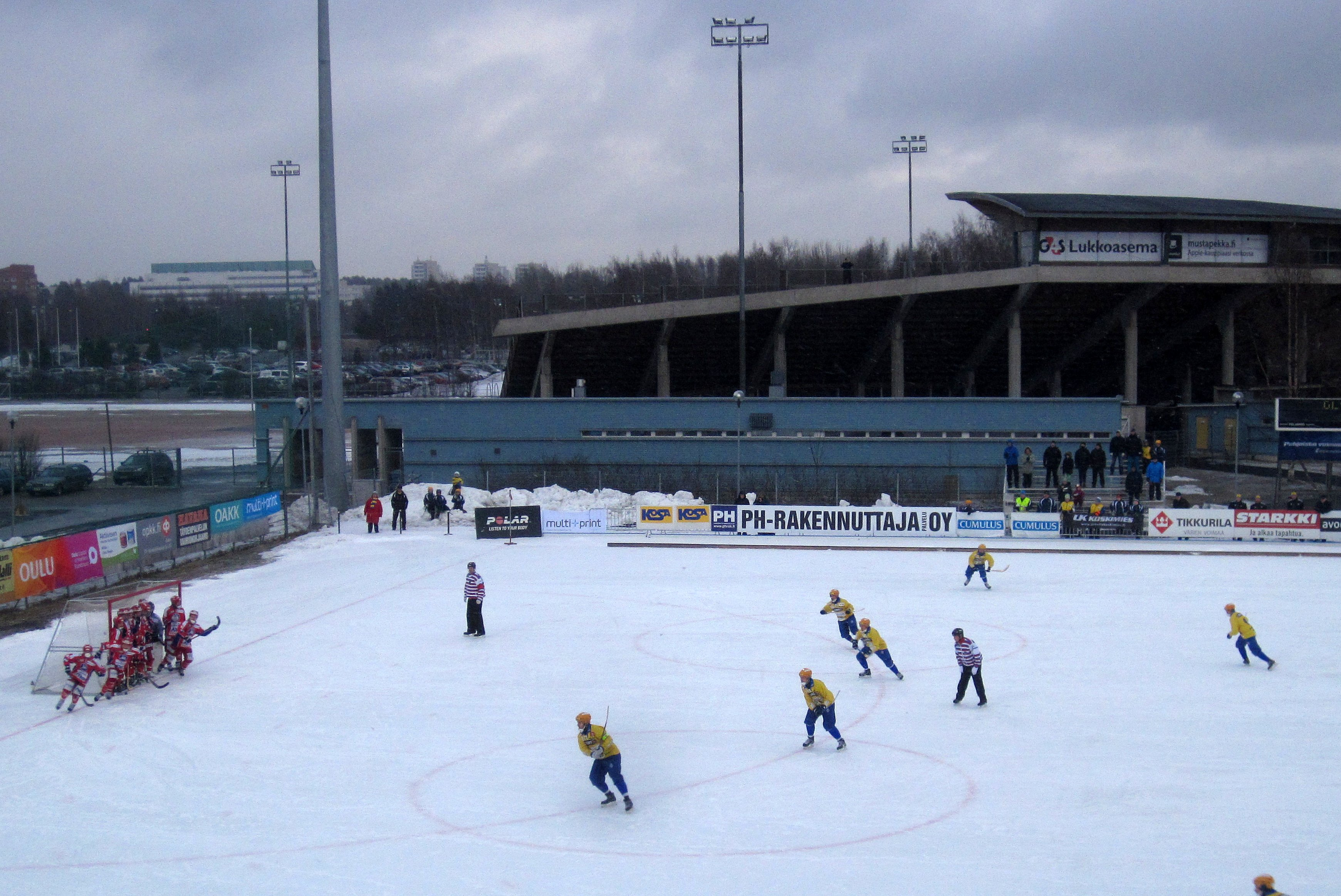
The main arena in Oulu

== Final four ==
Semi-finals
March 31
Finland	2
Sweden	4
March 31
Russia	13
Kazakhstan	5

Final
April 1
Sweden	1
Russia	6
Third place
April 1
Finland	3
Kazakhstan	2
