= 1999 Bandy World Championship =

21st Bandy World Championship

Tournament details
- Host country: Russia
- City: Arkhangelsk
- Venues: 2 (in 1 host city)
- Dates: 30 January – 7 February
- Teams: 6

Final positions
- Champions: Russia (1st / 15th title)
- Runners-up: Finland
- Third place: Sweden
- Fourth place: Norway

Tournament statistics
- Games played: 20
- Goals scored: 168 (8.4 per game)

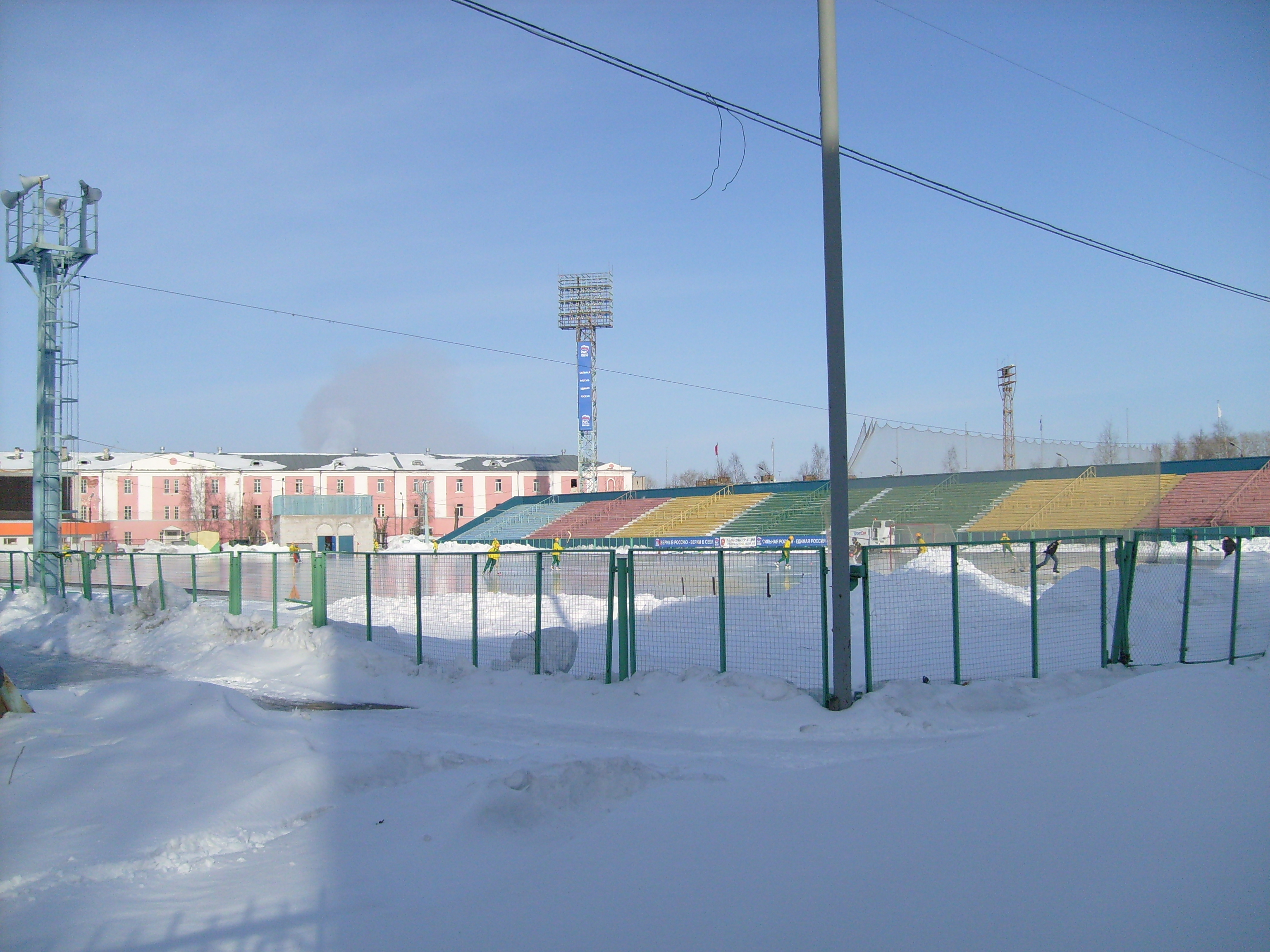
Vodnik's home stadium Trud, the arena for the final.

The 1999 Bandy World Championship was a competition between bandy playing nations for men. The championship was played in Arkhangelsk, Russia, between 30 January and 7 February 1999, with six teams contesting. Russia became champions.

== Participant teams ==
- Russia
- Finland
- Sweden
- Norway
- Kazakhstan
- United States

== Premier tour ==
- 30 January

Kazakhstan v USA 5–0
Sweden v Norway 8–1
Russia v Finland 5–3

- 31 January

USA v Sweden 0–11
Norway v Finland 4–5
Kazakhstan v Russia 2–11

- 1 February

Norway v Kazakhstan 6–2
Finland v Sweden 3–4
USA v Russia 1–12

- 3 February

Finland v USA 11–1
Sweden v Kazakhstan 16–0
Norway v Russia 1–6

- 4 February

Norway v USA 7–0
Kazakhstan v Finland 2–6
Russia v Sweden 0–0, 3–2 (penalty shootout)

Pos	Team	Pld	W	D	L	GF	GA	GD	Pts	Qualification
1	Russia	5	4	1	0	34	7	+27	9	Semifinals
2	Sweden	5	4	1	0	39	4	+35	9	Semifinals
3	Finland	5	3	0	2	28	16	+12	6	Semifinals
4	Norway	5	2	0	3	19	21	−2	4	Semifinals
5	Kazakhstan	5	1	0	4	11	39	−28	2	Match for 5th place
6	United States	5	0	0	5	2	46	−44	0	Match for 5th place

== Final Tour ==
=== Match for 5th place ===
- 6 February

Kazakhstan v USA 5–2

=== Semifinals ===
- 6 February

Russia v Norway 4–1
Finland v Sweden 6–2

=== Match for 3rd place ===
- 7 February

Sweden v Norway 9–1

=== Final ===
- 7 February

Russia v Finland 5–0
