= Can-Am Bandy Cup =

- Status: Active
- Genre: sports
- Frequency: annual
- Location: various
- Organiser: FIB

Can-Am Bandy Cup is the name of an annually recurring friendly bandy match played between the Canadian and the American national bandy teams.
