= 2010 Bandy World Championship =

Tournament details
- Host country: Russia
- City: Moscow
- Venue: Ice Palace Krylatskoye
- Dates: 24–31 January 2010
- Teams: 11

Final positions
- Champions: Sweden
- Runners-up: Russia
- Third place: Finland
- Fourth place: Kazakhstan

Tournament statistics
- Scoring leader(s): Yevgeny Ivanushkin & Pavel Ryazantsev (14 goals)

The Bandy World Championship 2010 was held between 24 and 31 January 2010, in Moscow, Russia. Men's teams from 11 countries participated in the 2010 competition: Finland, Kazakhstan, Norway, Russia, Sweden, the United States (group A) and Canada, Hungary, Latvia, Mongolia and the Netherlands (group B).

The tournament was won by Sweden, beating Russia with 6–5 after sudden death. The standing was 5–5 after full-time and the match winning goal was conceived by Daniel Mossberg, scoring in the 110th minute. This was Sweden's tenth Championship victory in this the XXIXth Bandy World Championship. Russia won silver medals and Finland won bronze medals.

All matches were played in the indoor venue Ice Palace Krylatskoye in Moscow, Russia.

== Participating teams ==
=== Division A ===
- Finland
- Kazakhstan
- Norway
- Russia
- Sweden
- United States

=== Division B ===
- Canada
- Hungary
- Latvia
- Mongolia
- Netherlands

Belarus had qualified for play in this year's Division A during the 2009 Bandy World Championship, but since they did not take part in 2010, the USA, which had lost the qualifier to Belarus in 2009, was promoted to Division A instead.

== Venues ==
Moscow
Ice Palace Krylatskoye
Capacity: 8,000
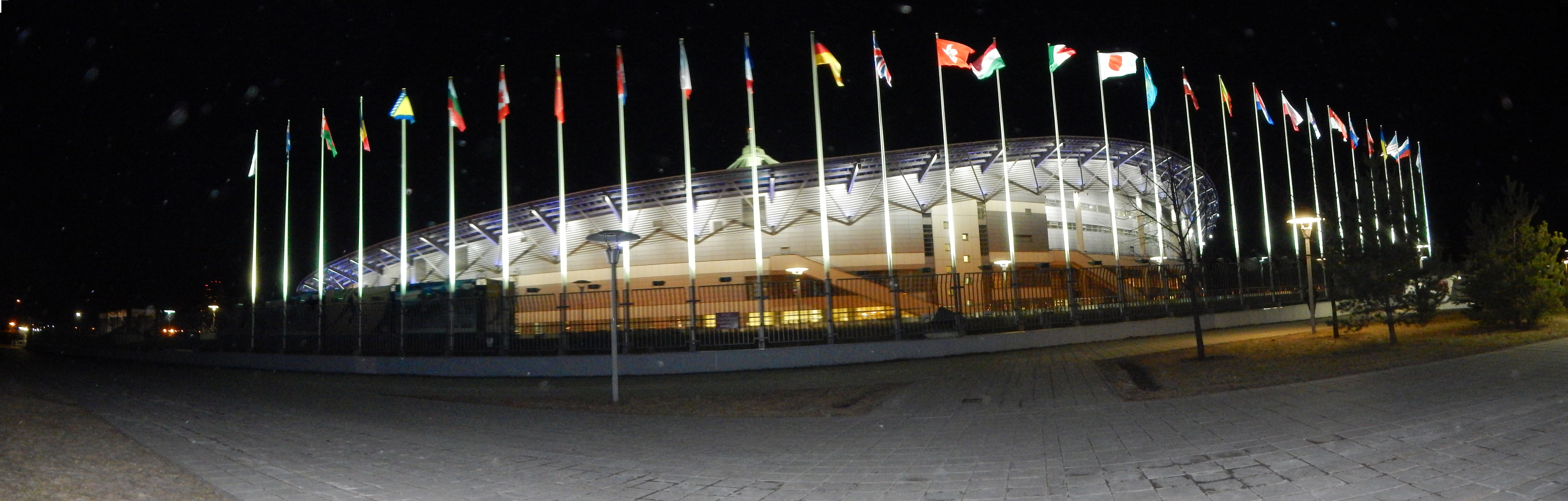

== Division A ==
=== Preliminary round ===
| Pos | Team | Pld | W | D | L | GF | GA | GD | Pts | Group stage result |
|---|---|---|---|---|---|---|---|---|---|---|
| 1 | Russia (H) | 5 | 5 | 0 | 0 | 64 | 17 | +47 | 10 | Advance to Knockout stage |
| 2 | Sweden | 5 | 4 | 0 | 1 | 51 | 16 | +35 | 8 | Advance to Knockout stage |
| 3 | Finland | 5 | 3 | 0 | 2 | 33 | 32 | +1 | 6 | Advance to Knockout stage |
| 4 | Kazakhstan | 5 | 2 | 0 | 3 | 28 | 39 | −11 | 4 | Advance to Knockout stage |
| 5 | Norway | 5 | 1 | 0 | 4 | 22 | 51 | −29 | 2 | |
| 6 | United States | 5 | 0 | 0 | 5 | 23 | 73 | −50 | 0 | Qualification to Relegation playoffs |

Updated to match(es) played on completed. Source:
(H) Hosts
24 January 2010

| Russia | 14–2 | Kazakhstan |

Ice Palace Krylatskoye, Moscow
24 January 2010

| Sweden | 8–1 | Finland |

Ice Palace Krylatskoye, Moscow
24 January 2010

| United States | 5–10 | Norway |

Ice Palace Krylatskoye, Moscow
25 January 2010

| Norway | 3–12 | Kazakhstan |

Ice Palace Krylatskoye, Moscow
25 January 2010

| Sweden | 14–6 | United States |

Ice Palace Krylatskoye, Moscow
25 January 2010

| Russia | 12–4 | Finland |

Ice Palace Krylatskoye, Moscow
26 January 2010

| Finland | 13–2 | United States |

Ice Palace Krylatskoye, Moscow
26 January 2010

| Kazakhstan | 0–12 | Sweden |

Ice Palace Krylatskoye, Moscow
26 January 2010

| Russia | 12–2 | Norway |

Ice Palace Krylatskoye, Moscow
27 January 2010

| Sweden | 13–2 | Norway |

Ice Palace Krylatskoye, Moscow
27 January 2010

| Finland | 6–5 | Kazakhstan |

Ice Palace Krylatskoye, Moscow
27 January 2010

| Russia | 19–5 | United States |

Ice Palace Krylatskoye, Moscow
28 January 2010

| United States | 4–9 | Kazakhstan |

Ice Palace Krylatskoye, Moscow
28 January 2010

| Norway | 5–9 | Finland |

Ice Palace Krylatskoye, Moscow
28 January 2010

| Russia | 7–4 | Sweden |

Ice Palace Krylatskoye, Moscow

=== Knockout stage ===
Semi-finals
30 January – Moscow
Russia | 16
Kazakhstan | 3
30 January – Moscow
Sweden | 9
Finland | 4

Final
31 January – Moscow
Russia | 5(5)
Sweden | 5(6)
Third place
31 January – Moscow
Kazakhstan | 3
Finland | 4

==== Semi-finals ====
30 January 2010

| Sweden | 9–4 | Finland |

Ice Palace Krylatskoye, Moscow
30 January 2010

| Russia | 16–3 | Kazakhstan |

Ice Palace Krylatskoye, Moscow

==== Third place play-off ====
31 January 2010

| Finland | 4–3 | Kazakhstan |

Ice Palace Krylatskoye, Moscow

==== Final ====
31 January 2010

| Russia | 5–6 (sd) | Sweden |

Ice Palace Krylatskoye, Moscow

== Division B ==
=== Preliminary round ===
| Pos | Team | Pld | W | D | L | GF | GA | GD | Pts | Group stage result |
|---|---|---|---|---|---|---|---|---|---|---|
| 1 | Canada | 4 | 4 | 0 | 0 | 65 | 6 | +59 | 8 | Qualification to Playoffs |
| 2 | Latvia | 4 | 2 | 1 | 1 | 21 | 27 | −6 | 5 (Note: Latvia won after-match penalties against Netherlands 3–2.) | Advance to Second place play-off |
| 3 | Netherlands | 4 | 2 | 1 | 1 | 15 | 29 | −14 | 5 | Advance to Second place play-off |
| 4 | Mongolia | 4 | 0 | 1 | 3 | 11 | 34 | −23 | 1 (Note: Mongolia won after-match penalties against Hungary 3–2.) | Advance to Fourth place play-off |
| 5 | Hungary | 4 | 0 | 1 | 3 | 16 | 32 | −16 | 1 | Advance to Fourth place play-off |

Updated to match(es) played on completed. Source:
Notes:
24 January 2010

| Netherlands | 5–4 | Hungary |

Ice Palace Krylatskoye, Moscow
24 January 2010

| Canada | 15–2 | Latvia |

Ice Palace Krylatskoye, Moscow
25 January 2010

| Netherlands | 1–17 | Canada |

Ice Palace Krylatskoye, Moscow
25 January 2010

| Hungary | 5–5 | Mongolia |

Ice Palace Krylatskoye, Moscow
26 January 2010

| Mongolia | 2–18 | Canada |

Ice Palace Krylatskoye, Moscow
26 January 2010

| Latvia | 5–5 | Netherlands |

Ice Palace Krylatskoye, Moscow
27 January 2010

| Canada | 15–1 | Hungary |

Ice Palace Krylatskoye, Moscow
27 January 2010

| Mongolia | 1–7 | Latvia |

Ice Palace Krylatskoye, Moscow
28 January 2010

| Netherlands | 4–3 | Mongolia |

Ice Palace Krylatskoye, Moscow
28 January 2010

| Latvia | 7–6 | Hungary |

Ice Palace Krylatskoye, Moscow

=== Knockout stage ===
==== Fourth place play-off ====
30 January 2010

| Mongolia | 5–5 | Hungary |
Penalties
| | 1–2 |

Ice Palace Krylatskoye, Moscow

==== Second place play-off ====
30 January 2010

| Latvia | 7–4 | Netherlands |

Ice Palace Krylatskoye, Moscow

== Relegation playoffs ==
The team that finished last in Division A, the United States, and the winner in Division B, Canada, met in a qualifying match for the vacant seat in next year's WC Division A. The match was won by 9–6 by the USA, thus secured another year in Division A.

30 January 2010

| United States | 9–6 | Canada |

Ice Palace Krylatskoye, Moscow

== Sources ==
- Official website (in English and Russian)
