= Lokomotiv Orenburg =

- City: Orenburg, Russia
- League: Russian Bandy Supreme League
- Division: Group 2
- Founded: 1937; 88 years ago
- Home arena: Orenburg Stadium

KhK Lokomotiv Orenburg (Russian: ХК «Локомотив» Оренбург) is a bandy club in Orenburg, Russia, established in 1937. The club has earlier been playing in the Russian Bandy Super League, the top-tier of Russian bandy. The home games are played at Stadium Orenburg in Orenburg. The club colours are red, white and blue.
