= 2022 Bandy World Championship =

International sport competition

2022 World Championships
- Location: Syktyvkar, Russia
- Dates: 27 March – 3 April (Division A) (Note: Cancelled)

The 2022 Bandy World Championship was to be held from 27 March to 3 April 2022 in Syktyvkar, Russia.

== History ==
The championship was originally scheduled to take place from 30 March to 4 April 2021 but was postponed due to the COVID-19 pandemic.

The Federation of International Bandy (FIB) had announced that the 2020 Division A tournament in Irkutsk would be finalised in October 2021, and the subsequent World Championship in Syktyvkar (originally scheduled for 2021) would instead be played in 2022. On 24 August 2021, Sweden announced its withdrawals from the competition in Irkutsk, due to the continued threat of COVID-19; Finland and Norway had already made the same decisions earlier. Subsequently, on 30 August 2021, the FIB decided to postpone the championships once again, now to March - April 2022.

On 24 February 2022, the Finland's Bandy Association announced that they would not take part in the competition due to the Russian invasion of Ukraine that day. Later on the same day, Sweden, Norway, and the United States also pulled out of the tournament. The FIB then announced on 1 March 2022 that the tournament would be cancelled altogether due to so few countries wanting to participate.
