= Yunost Stadium (Oral) =

Sports stadium in Oral, Kazakhstan

Coordinates: 52.04245°N 113.47274°E

Yunost Stadium (or Zhastar Stadium in Kazakh:) (Russian: Стадион «Юность», lit. 'Youth Stadium') is a sports stadium in Oral, Kazakhstan. The stadium is used for the home games of bandy team Akzhayik Sports Club. Starting in the 2017–18 season, the stadium was supposed to have an artificial ice surface. It got delayed but in 2018 it was officially ready for use.
