= Akzhayik Sports Club =

Bandy team in Kazakhstan

Akzhayik
- City: Uralsk, Kazakhstan
- League: Russian Bandy Supreme League
- Home arena: Yunost Stadium
- Website: sc-akzhayik.kz

Akzhayik Sports Club (Kazakh: Aqjаi'yq spоrt kly'by,Russian: Спортивный клуб Акжайык), also known as Aqjaiyiq is a bandy team in Kazakhstan, which is the only professional team in the country. The team has not participated in any professional league since the 2024/25 season.

Their home arena is Stadion Yunost (Stadion Zhastar in Kazakh), which was supposed to become equipped for artificial ice in 2015, however, the project got delayed. In October 2016, works with the aim of finishing the project started. Therefore, in the season 2016-17 their home arena was Stadion Stenovik in Zashagan (Zachagansk in Russian), a nearby village administered by the city of Oral (Uralsk). By July 2017 the schedule was that the works at Stadion Yunost should be completed before the end of the year. In October the date of opening was pinpointed to the 16th of December. Still the first home matches of the season was played on Stenovik and now it was presumed that Stadion Yunost could not be used before the 2018-19 season. In 2018 it officially was ready for use. All the players of the Youth-23 national team in the 2013-14 season came from this club. In September 2017 Kazakhstan Bandy Federation bought the club. The club colours are yellow, white and blue.
