= Bandy =

Ballgame on ice

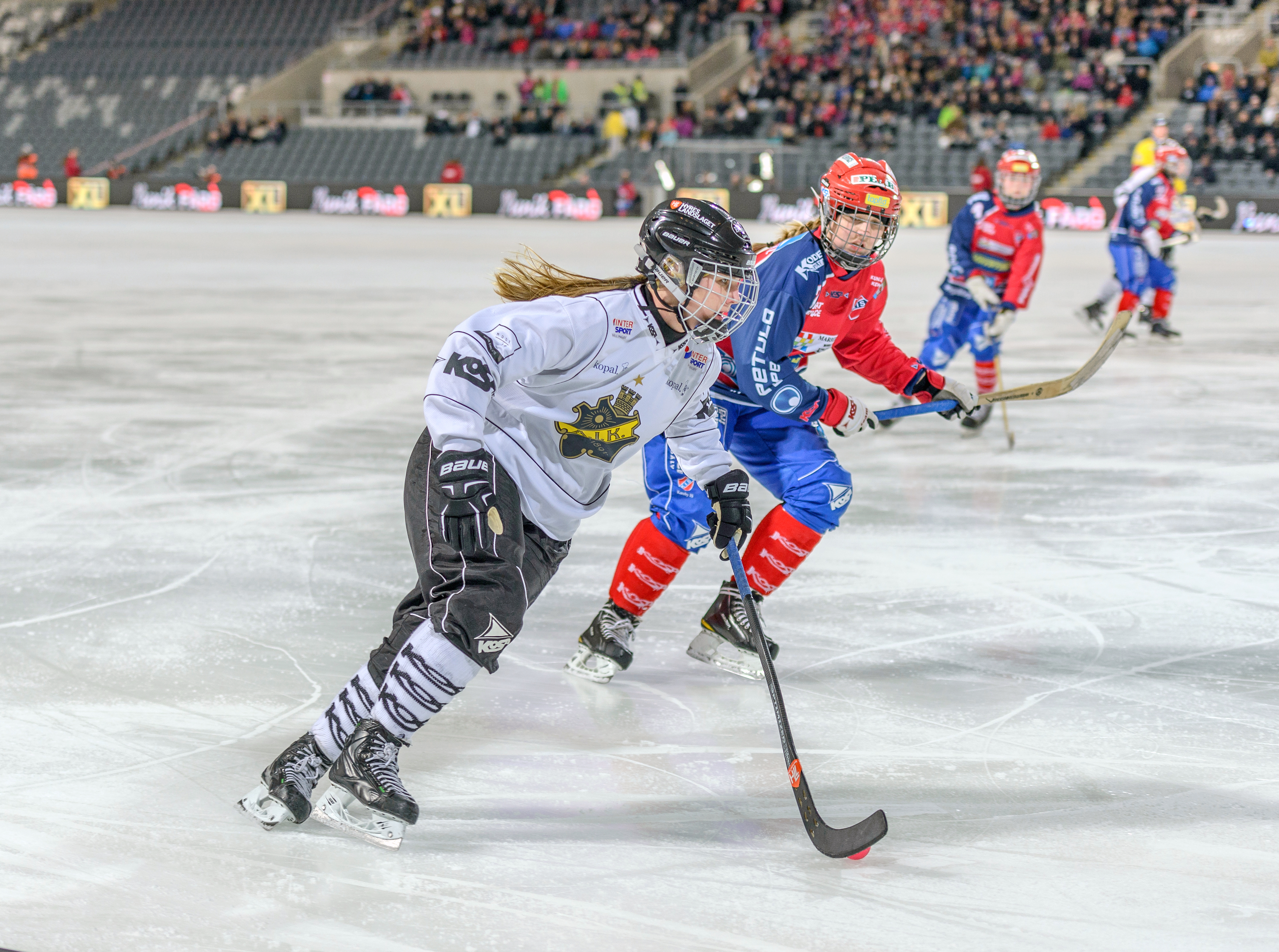
- Swedish Championship, Women's final, 2015
- Highest governing body: Federation of International Bandy (FIB)
- Nicknames: Hockey on the ice, Winter football
- First played: 1882; 144 years ago England

Characteristics
- Contact: Limited (Shouldering allowed but body checking illegal)
- Team members: 11 field players
- Mixed-sex: No, separate competitions
- Type: Team sport; Winter sport
- Equipment: Bandy ball; Bandy stick; Bandy skates; Protective equipment
- Venue: Bandy field (official); Sports complex; Frozen body of water; lake, river, pond; Ice rink; Ice field

Presence
- Olympic: Demonstration 1952; (recognized as a sport by the IOC in 2001)
- Paralympic: No
- World Games: No

Bandy is a winter sport and ball sport played by two teams wearing ice skates on a large ice surface (either indoors or outdoors) while using sticks to direct a ball into the opposing team's goal. Bandy is sometimes considered the predecessor of ice hockey, both sports belonging to a family of sports called hockey.

The playing surface, called a bandy field or bandy rink, is a sheet of ice which measures 90–110 metres (300–360 ft) by 45–65 metres (148–213 ft), about the size of a football pitch. The field is considerably larger than the ice rinks commonly used for ice hockey.

The sport has a common background with association football, ice hockey, shinty, and field hockey. Bandy's origins are debatable, but its first rules were organized and published in England in 1882.

Internationally, bandy's strongest nations in both men's and women's competitions have long been Sweden and Russia; both countries have established professional men's bandy leagues. In Russia, it is estimated that more than one million people play bandy. The sport also has organized league play and fans in other countries, including Finland, Norway, and Kazakhstan. The premier international bandy competition for men is the Bandy World Championship and for women it is the Women's Bandy World Championship.

Organized bandy started in the late 19th century; however, until 1955, there was no established international governing body for the sport. Since February 1955, the sport is governed by the Federation of International Bandy (FIB). In 2001, bandy was recognized as a sport by the International Olympic Committee (IOC). Both traditional eleven-a-side bandy and rink bandy (which is played on a smaller rink) are recognized by the IOC. During the 2025-26 season, short bandy was approved by the FIB as an official discipline. Based on the number of participating athletes, the FIB has claimed bandy is the world's second-most participated winter sport after ice hockey.

== History ==
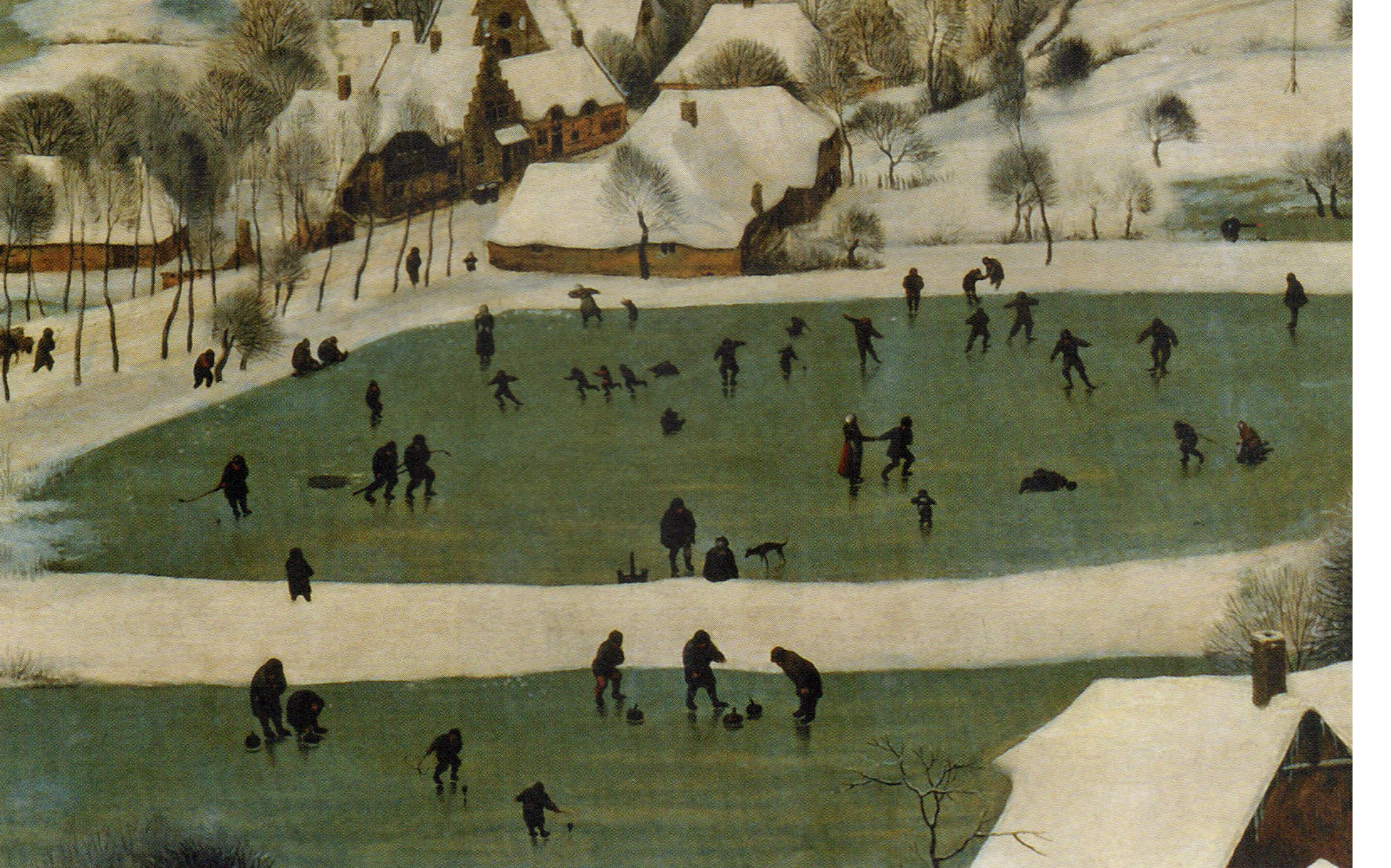
Detail from Brueghel's 1565 The Hunters in the Snow

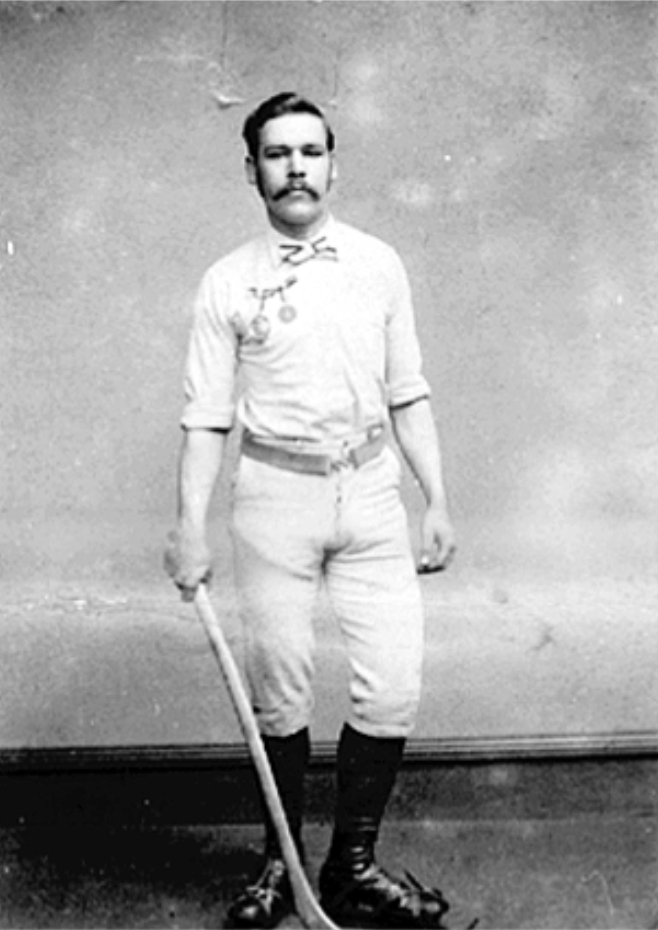
Charles Goodman Tebbutt with a bandy stick in 1889

=== Background ===
The earliest origin of the sport is debated. Though many Russians see their old countrymen as the creators of the sport – reflected by the unofficial title for bandy, "Russian hockey" (русский хоккей) – Russia, Sweden, medieval Iceland (it has been compared to knattleikr), the Netherlands, England, and Wales each had pastimes, such as bando, which can be seen as forerunners of bandy. The mid-eighteenth-century Devonshire Dialogue collection lists Bandy as "a game, like that of Golf, in which the adverse parties endeavour to beat a ball (generally a knob or gnarl from the trunk of a tree,) opposite ways... the stick with which the game is played is crook'd at the end".

The sport's first published set of organized rules was codified in 1882 by Charles Goodman Tebbutt of the Bury Fen Bandy Club. When the international federation was founded in 1955, it came about after a compromise between Russian and English rules, in which more of the English rules prevailed.

Since association football was already popular in England, the codified bandy rules took after much of the football rules. Like association football, games are normally two 45 minute halves and there are 11 players per side. Players sticks are curved like large field hockey sticks and the bandy ball is roughly the size of a tennis ball with a cork core and hard plastic coating. Bandy balls were originally usually red but are now either orange or more commonly cerise.

=== Early days ===
==== 19th Century: the sport is formalised ====
Bandy as an ice skating sport first developed in England. It developed as a winter sport in the Fens of East Anglia. Large expanses of ice would form on the flooded meadows or shallow washes in cold winters where fen skating, which has been a tradition dating back to at least medieval times, took place. Bandy's early recorded modernization period can be traced back to 1813.

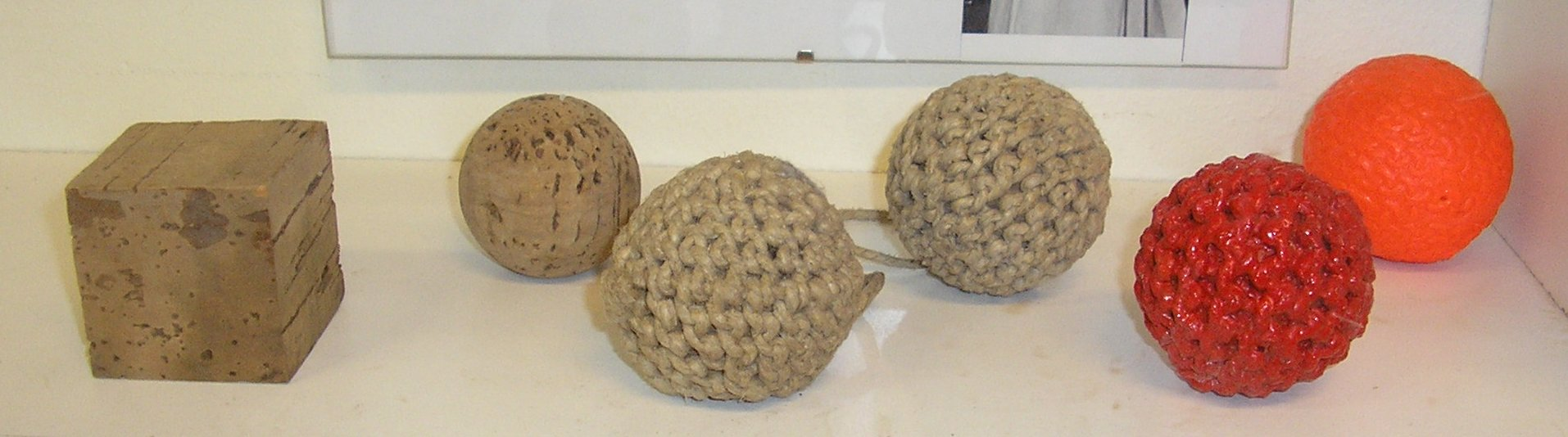
Making of a historic bandy ball in stages, from the original cork on the left to the final ball painted red, with a modern bandy ball to far right

Members of the Bury Fen Bandy Club published rules of the game in 1882, and introduced it into other European countries. A variety of stick and ball games involving ice skating were introduced to North America by the 1800s but failed to organize and develop popular rules codes. However, these stick and ball games became one of the eventual antecedents of the modern sport of ice hockey, whose first rules were codified in Canada in 1875.

The first international bandy match took place in 1891 between Bury Fen and the Haarlemsche Hockey & Bandy Club from the Netherlands (a club which after a couple of club fusions now is named HC Bloemendaal). The same year, the National Bandy Association was established as a governing body for the sport in England. National governing federations for bandy were also founded in the 1890s in the Netherlands and Russia and in the following decade in Finland (then part of the Russian Empire), Sweden, and Norway.

The match later dubbed "the original bandy match", was actually held in 1875 at The Crystal Palace in London. However, at the time, the game was called "hockey on the ice", probably as it was considered an ice variant of field hockey.

An early maker of bandy sticks was the firm of Gray's, Cambridge. One such stick, now in the collections of the Museum of Cambridge, has a length of rope twisted round the handle to rescue any player who might fall through the ice, as the game was played on frozen lakes back then. An 1899 photo of two players demonstrating the game shows the sticks being held single-handed.

Historically, bandy was a popular sport in some central and western European countries until the First World War, and from 1901 to 1926 it was played in the Scandinavian Nordic Games, the first international multi-sport event focused on winter sports.

==== First national bandy league ====
The first national bandy league in modern history was started in Sweden in 1902.

==== Bandy in the Nordic Games ====
Bandy was played at the Nordic Games in both Stockholm and Kristiania (present day Oslo) in 1901, 1903, 1905, 1909, 1913, 1917, 1922 and 1926, and between Swedish, Finnish and Russian teams at similar games in Helsinki in 1907. Bandy appeared as a sport in all eight editions of the Nordic Games from 1901 to 1926.

==== Bandy at the Winter Spartakiad ====
The Spartakiad was an international multisport event arranged by workers' sports clubs in the 1920s and 1930s and sponsored by the Soviet Union. In the first Winter Spartakiad, held in Oslo, Norway, in 1928, bandy was played by teams from Norway, the Soviet Union and Sweden.

==== Bandy at the 1952 Olympics ====
Bandy was played as a demonstration sport at the 1952 Oslo Olympics. Norway, Finland and Sweden took part. Finland defeated Norway 3-2 in front of 500 fans. Norway then took on the Swedes later that day, with 3000 people watching as the underdog Norwegians defeated Sweden 2-1, which was their first recorded victory versus their larger neighbor. In the final game, Sweden beat Finland 4-0.

=== Etymology ===
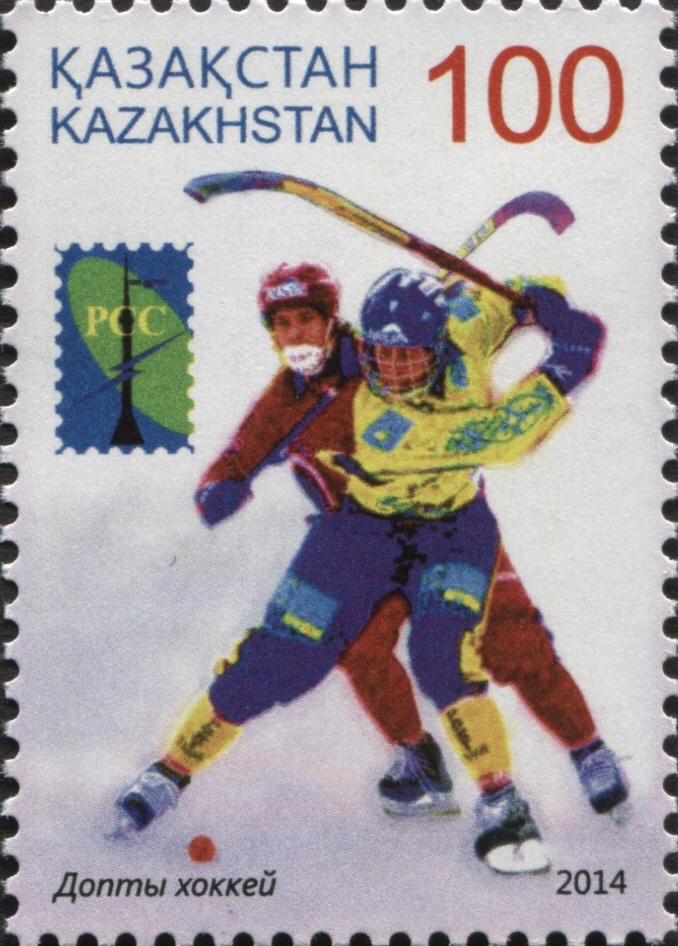
Kazakh stamp featuring bandy (допты хоккей dopty khokkey, "ball hockey")

The sport's English name comes from the verb "to bandy", from the Middle French bander ("to strike back and forth"), and originally referred to a seventeenth-century Irish game similar to field hockey. The curved stick was also called a "bandy". The etymological connection to the similarly named Welsh hockey game of bando is not clear.

An old name for bandy is hockey on the ice; in the first rule books from England at the turn of the century 1900, the sport is literally called "bandy or hockey on the ice". Since the early 20th century, the term bandy is usually preferred to prevent confusion with ice hockey.

The sport is known as bandy in many languages, with a few exceptions. In Russia, bandy is called "Russian hockey" (русский хоккей) or more frequently, and officially, "hockey with a ball" (хоккей с мячом) while ice hockey is called "hockey with a puck" (хоккей с шайбой) or more frequently just "hockey". If the context makes it clear that bandy is the subject, it as well can be called just "hockey". In Belarusian, Ukrainian and Bulgarian it is also called "hockey with a ball" (хакей з мячoм, хокей з м'ячем and хокей с топка respectively). In Slovak "bandy hockey" (bandyhokej) is the name. In Armenian, Kazakh, Kyrgyz, Mongol and Uzbek, bandy is known as "ball hockey" (գնդակով հոկեյ, допты хоккей, топтуу хоккей, бөмбөгтэй хоккей and koptokli xokkey respectively). In Finnish the two sports are distinguished as "ice ball" (jääpallo) and "ice puck" (jääkiekko), as well as in Hungarian (jéglabda; jégkorong), although in Hungarian it is more often called "bandy" nowadays. In Estonian and Lithuanian bandy is also called "ice ball" (jääpall; ledo riedulys). In Mandarin Chinese it is "bandy ball" (班迪球). In Scottish Gaelic the name is "ice shinty" (camanachd-deighe). In old times shinty or shinney were also sometimes used in English for bandy.

Because of its similarities with association football, bandy is also nicknamed "winter football" (Swedish: Vinterns fotboll).

=== Historical relationship with other sports ===
==== Bandy and association football ====
With association football and hockey on ice or bandy both being popular sports in parts of Europe around 1900, bandy was highly influenced by football and taking after its main rules: having a field approximately the same size, having the same number of players on each team and having the same game time (2×45 minutes). It is natural that bandy got the nickname 'winter football'.

It was common for sports clubs to have both a bandy and a football section, with athletes playing both sports but at different times of the year. Some examples are Nottingham Forest Football and Bandy Club in England (today known just as Nottingham Forest F.C.) and Norwegian Strømsgodset IF and Mjøndalen IF, with both having an active bandy section.

In Sweden, most football clubs that were active during the first half of the 20th century also played bandy. Swedish player Orvar Bergmark earned silver medals in the world championships of both sports in the 1950s. Later, as the season for each sport increased in time, it was not as easy for the players to engage in both sports, so some clubs came to concentrate on one or the other. Many old clubs still have both sports on their program. Sten-Ove Ramberg is the last Swedish male player in both national teams (1978 in bandy, 1979–1984 in football).

==== Bandy and ice hockey ====
No clear distinction between bandy and ice hockey was made before the 1920s. As bandy in a way can be seen as a precursor to ice hockey, bandy has influenced the development and history of ice hockey, mainly in European and former Soviet countries. While modern ice hockey was created in Canada, a variety of games which bore a closer resemblance to bandy were initially played there after British soldiers introduced the game of bandy in the late 19th century. At the same time as modern ice hockey rules were formalized in British North America (present-day Canada), bandy rules were decided upon in Europe. A cross between English and Russian bandy rules eventually developed with the football-inspired English rules (cf the passage above about bandy and Association football) becoming dominant, together with the Russian low-border along most of the two sidelines, an addition to the sport which has maintained its presence since the 1950s.

Before Canadians introduced ice hockey into Europe in the early 20th century, "hockey" was another name for bandy, and still is in parts of Russia and Kazakhstan.

Both bandy and ice hockey were played in Europe during the 20th century, especially in Sweden, Finland, and Norway. Ice hockey became more popular than bandy in most of Europe, mostly because it had become an Olympic sport, while bandy had not. Athletes in Europe who had played bandy switched to ice hockey in the 1920s to compete in the Olympics. The smaller ice fields needed for ice hockey also made its rinks easier to maintain, especially in countries with short winters. On the other hand, ice hockey was not played in the Soviet Union until the 1950s, when the USSR wanted to compete internationally. The typical European style of ice hockey, with flowing, less physical play, represents a heritage of bandy.

=== Modern development ===
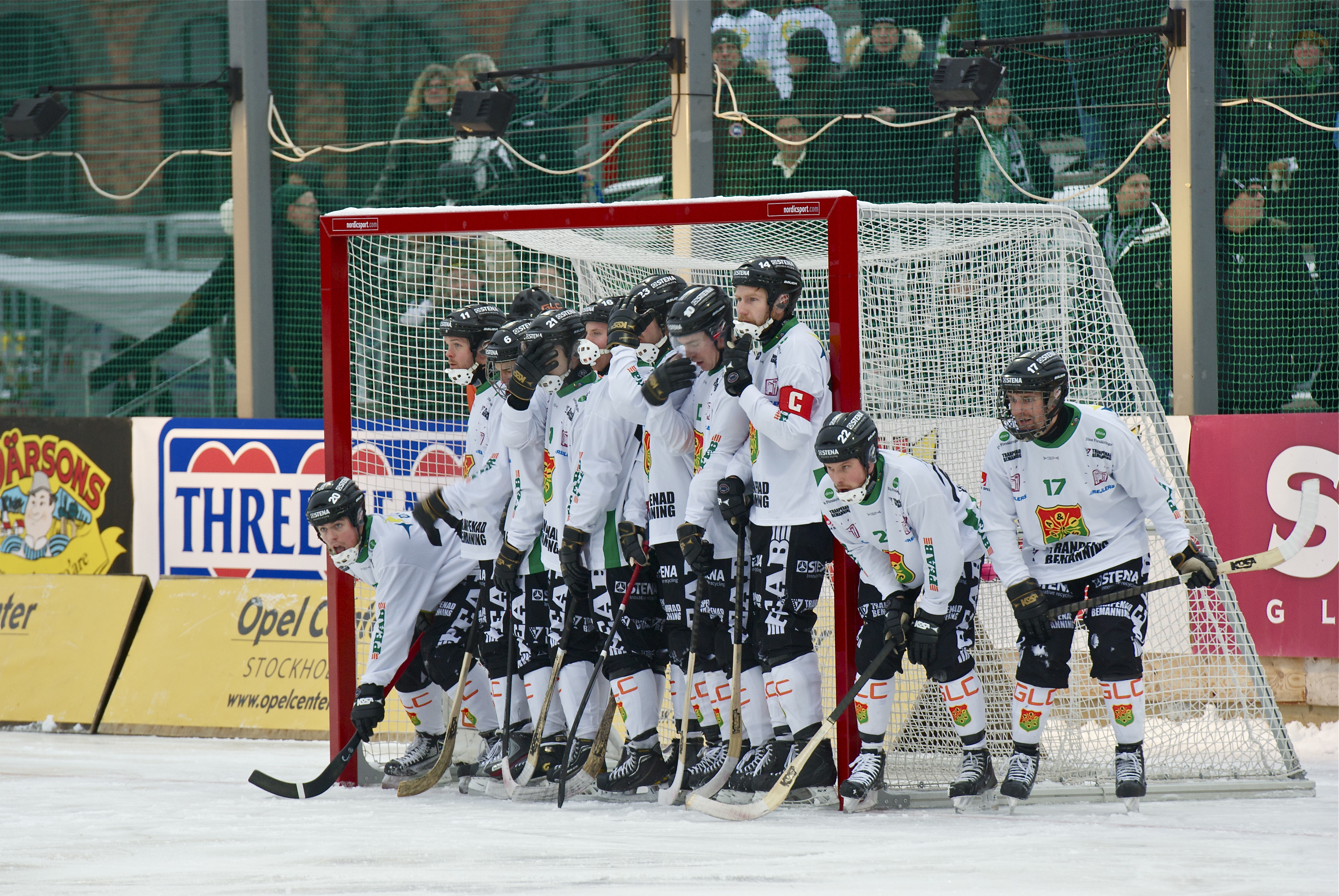
The Bandy team GAIS preparing to defend their goal against a corner stroke in 2012

==== World Championships and Russian performance ====
A bandy pictogram

Since the 1950s, when the Soviet Union ended its isolation and started to take part in international sports events, there has been a reason to play world championships. The International Bandy Federation was founded in 1955 and the first world championships were played in 1957 with the Soviet Union and then Russia (as its successor country in 1993) almost consistently in a top position in the sport of bandy alongside Sweden. Finland has won once, in 2004.

In a similar fashion, Russia, along with Sweden, has emerged as one of the two dominant women's bandy nations internationally in the Women's Bandy World Championship.

==== Women's bandy ====
Women's bandy uses the exact same rules as men, but the women's game is played separately. Women have been playing bandy since the sport was originally developed. Although there were several attempts in the early part of the 19th century to organize bandy leagues for women's teams, regular leagues only started in the 1970s in Sweden and Finland and then later in the 1980s in Norway and the Soviet Union.

==== Highest altitude ====
The highest altitude where bandy has been played is in Khorugh, the capital of the Tajik autonomous province of Gorno-Badakhshan. Khorugh is situated 2,200 metres (7,200 feet) above sea level in the Pamir Mountains.

==== Bandy moving indoors ====
Starting in the 1980s and increasingly since the turn of the millennium, more and more indoor arenas for bandy have been built (often as joint arenas to be used also for football or speed skating). The use of indoor arenas makes the effects of the weather on a game virtually insignificant, something which earlier always have been a factor to consider for the teams and the audiences. However, unlike some other sports, bandy is still the same game with the same rules indoors or outdoors and no changes are made to the rules depending on whether there's a roof overhead or not. Many games, even in the highest leagues, are still played outdoors. In Sweden there are more indoor arenas than in all other countries combined.

== Overview ==
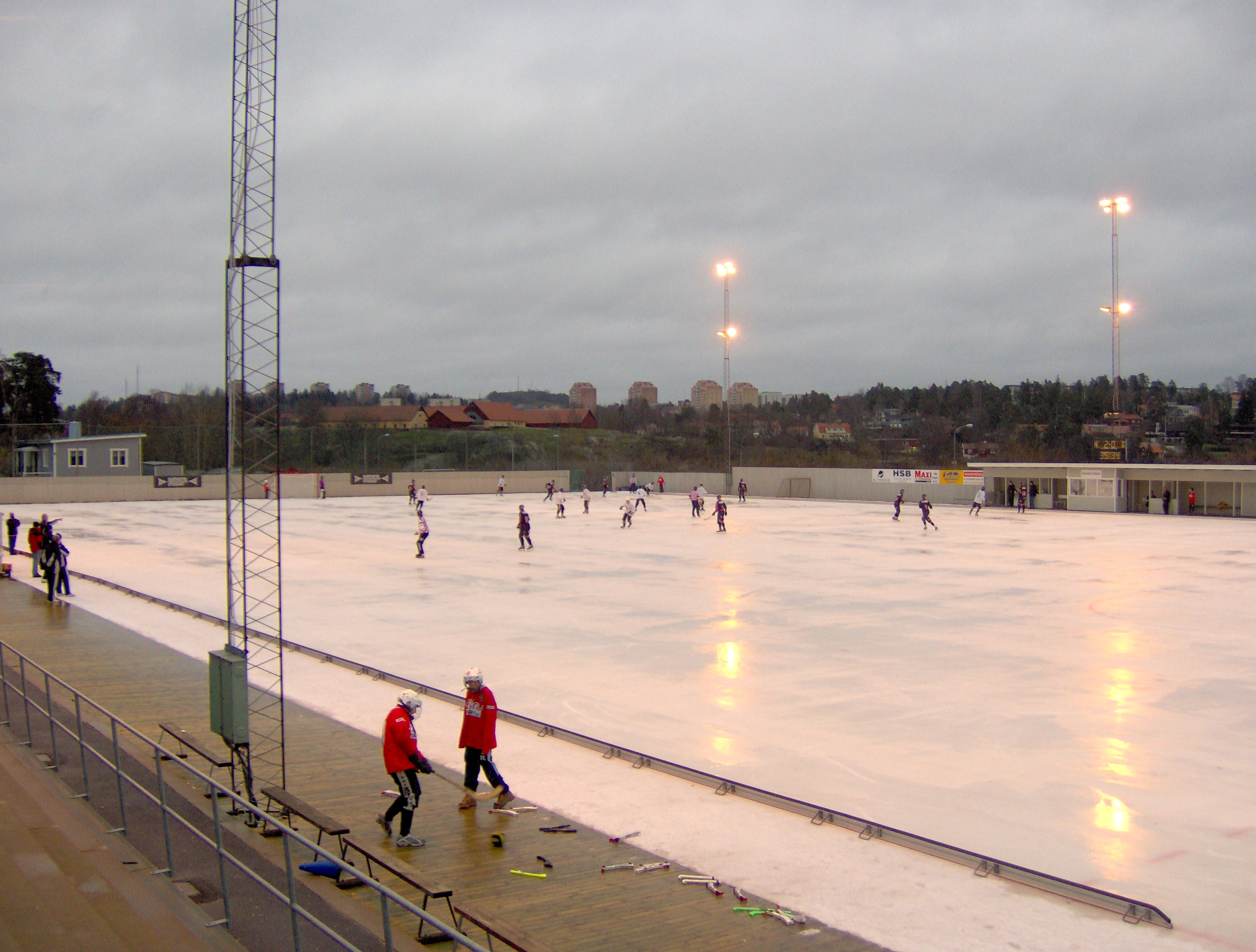
View of an outdoor bandy match in Sweden in December 2006

Bandy is played on ice, using a single round bandy ball. Two teams of 11 players each compete to get the ball into the other team's goal using bandy sticks, thereby scoring a goal. The team that has scored more goals at the end of the game is the winner. If both teams have scored an equal number of goals, then, with some exceptions, the game is a draw. The game is designed to be played on a rectangular sheet of ice, called a bandy field, which is the same size as a football (soccer) field.

In a typical game, players attempt to propel the ball toward their opponents' goal through individual control of the ball, such as by dribbling, passing the ball to a teammate, and taking shots at the goal, which is guarded by the opposing goalkeeper. Opposing players may try to regain control of the ball by intercepting a pass or tackling the opponent who controls the ball. However, physical contact between opponents is limited. Bandy is generally a free-flowing game, with play stopping only when the ball has left the field of play, or when play is stopped by the referee. After a stoppage, play can recommence with a free stroke, a penalty shot or a corner stroke. If the ball has left the field along the sidelines, the referee must decide which team touched the ball last, and award a restart stroke to the opposing team, just like football's throw-in.

In terms of rules, bandy has several rules that are similar to football. Each team has 11 players, one of whom is a goalkeeper. Goalkeepers use gloves made specifically for their position and wear them on both hands but do not use any type of stick. The offside rule, which in general is similar to the one used in football, is also employed. A goal cannot be scored from a goal throw, but unlike football, a goal can be scored from a stroke-in. All free strokes are "direct" and allow a goal to be scored without another player touching the ball. A primary rule is that players (other than the goalkeepers) may not intentionally touch the ball with their heads, hands or arms during play. Although players usually use their sticks to move the ball around, they may use any part of their bodies other than their heads, hands or arms and may use their skates in a limited manner.

The rules do not specify any player positions other than goalkeeper, but a number of player specialisations have evolved. Broadly, these include three main categories:

- forwards, whose main task is to score goals
- defenders, who specialise in preventing their opponents from scoring
- midfielders, who take the ball from the opposition and pass it to the forwards.

Players in these positions are referred to as outfield players, to discern them from the single goalkeeper. These positions are further differentiated by which side of the field the player spends most time in. For example, there are central defenders, and left and right midfielders. The ten outfield players may be arranged in these positions in any combination (for example, there may be three defenders, five midfielders, and two forwards), and the number of players in each position determines the style of the team's play; more forwards and fewer defenders would create a more aggressive and offensive-minded game, while the reverse would create a slower, more defensive style of play. While players may spend most of the game in a specific position, there are few restrictions on player movement, and players can switch positions at any time. The layout of the players on the pitch is called the team's formation, and defining the team's formation and tactics is usually the prerogative of the team's manager(s). Formation in bandy is often comparable to the formation in association football.

Shouldering is allowed in checking situations and body contact therefore does occur, but body checking and fighting are illegal.

Bandy is a swift game. Elite players have a mean skating velocity of over 16 km/h (10 mph) and the skating velocity can in some cases reach 37 km/h (23 mph).

== Rules ==
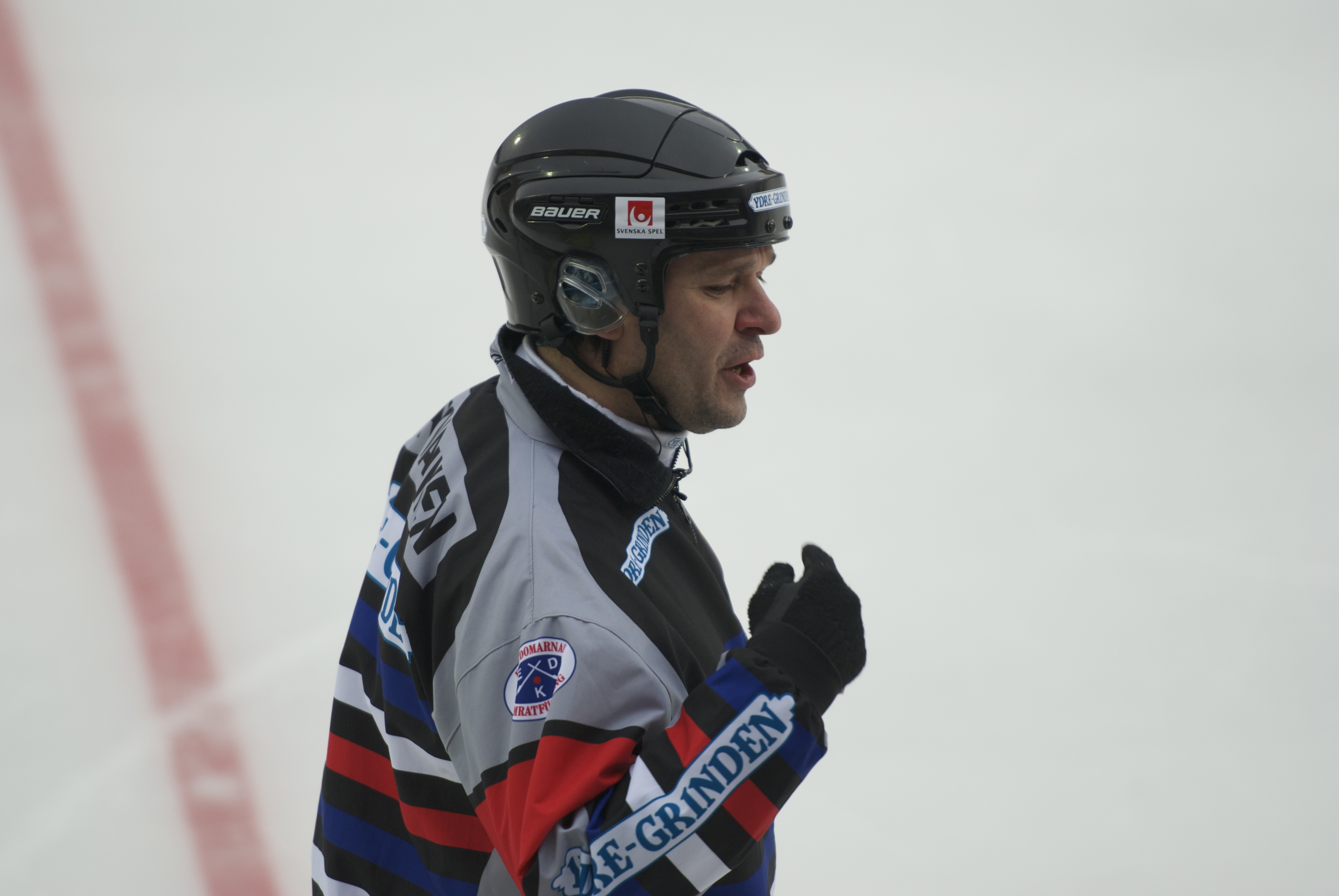
Referee

There are eighteen rules in official play, designed to apply to all levels of bandy, although certain modifications for groups such as juniors, veterans or women are permitted. The rules are often framed in broad terms, which allow flexibility in their application depending on the nature of the game. A game is officiated by a referee, the authority and enforcer of the rules, whose decisions are final. The referee may have one or two assistant referees. A secretary outside of the field often takes care of the match protocol.

The Bandy Playing Rules can be found on the official website of the Federation of International Bandy, and are overseen by the Rules and Referee Committee.

=== Players ===
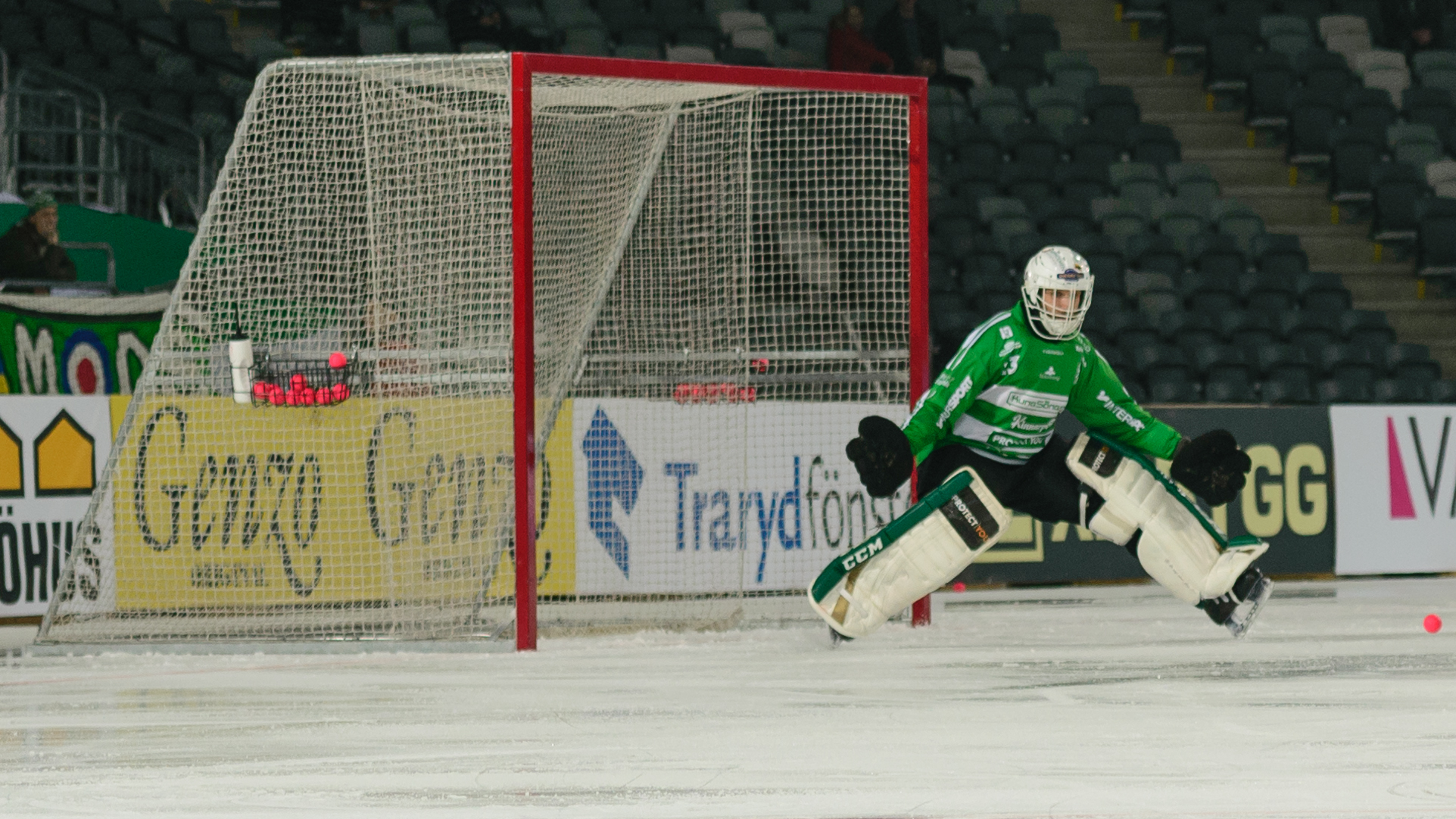
The goalkeeper has no stick.

Each team consists of a maximum of 11 players (excluding substitutes), one of whom must be the goalkeeper. A team of fewer than eight players may not start a game. Goalkeepers are the only players allowed to play the ball with their hands or arms, and they are only allowed to do so within the penalty area in front of their own goal.

Though there are a variety of positions in which the outfield (non-goalkeeper) players are strategically placed by a coach, these positions are not defined or required by the rules of the game.

The positions and formations of the players in bandy are virtually the same as the common association football positions and the same terms are used for the different positions of the players. A team usually consists of defenders, midfielders and forwards. The defenders can play in the form of centre-backs, full-backs and sometimes wing-backs, midfielders playing in the centre, attacking or defensive, and forwards in the form of centre forward, second strikers and sometimes a winger. Sometimes one player is also taking up the role of a libero.

Any number of players may be replaced by substitutes during the course of the game. Substitutions can be performed without notifying the referee and can be performed while the ball is in play. However, the substitute must leave the ice before the teammate enters it. A team can bring at the most four substitutes to the game, five if one of these is an extra goalkeeper.

=== Formation ===
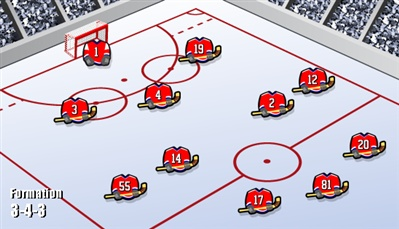
Bandy positions in 3–4–3 formation

Formation in bandy describes how the players in a team generally position themselves on the rink and is often comparable to the formation in association football. The team's manager(s) define the team's formation while tactics are usually their prerogative as well.

Bandy is a fluid and fast-moving game, and (with the exception of the goalkeeper) a player's position in a formation defines their role less rigidly than — for instance — for a rugby player, nor are there episodes in play where players must expressly line up in formation (as in gridiron football). The bandy games are more similar to association football in this regard. Nevertheless, a player's position in a formation generally defines whether a player has a mostly defensive or attacking role, and whether they tend to play towards one side of the pitch or centrally.

=== Duration and tie-breaking measures ===
A standard adult bandy match consists of two periods of 45 minutes each, known as halves. Each half runs continuously, meaning the clock is not stopped when the ball is out of play; the referee can, however, make allowance for time lost through significant stoppages as described below. There is usually a 15-minute half-time break. The end of the match is known as full-time.

The referee is the official timekeeper for the match and may make an allowance for time lost through substitutions, injured players requiring attention, or other stoppages. This added time is commonly referred to as stoppage time or injury-time, and must be reported to the match secretary and the two captains. The referee alone signals the end of the match.

If it is very cold or if it is snowing, the match can be broken into thirds of 30 minutes each. At the extremely cold 1999 World Championship some matches were played in four periods of 15 minutes each and with extra long breaks in between. In the World Championships the two halves can be 30 minutes each for the nations in the B division.

In league competitions, games may end in a draw, but in some knockout competitions if a game is tied at the end of regulation time it may go into extra time, which usually consists of two further 10-minute periods. If the score is still tied after extra time, the game will be decided on penalties. The teams shoot five penalties each and if this doesn't settle the game, the teams shoot one more penalty each until one of them misses and the other scores.

=== Ball in and out of play ===
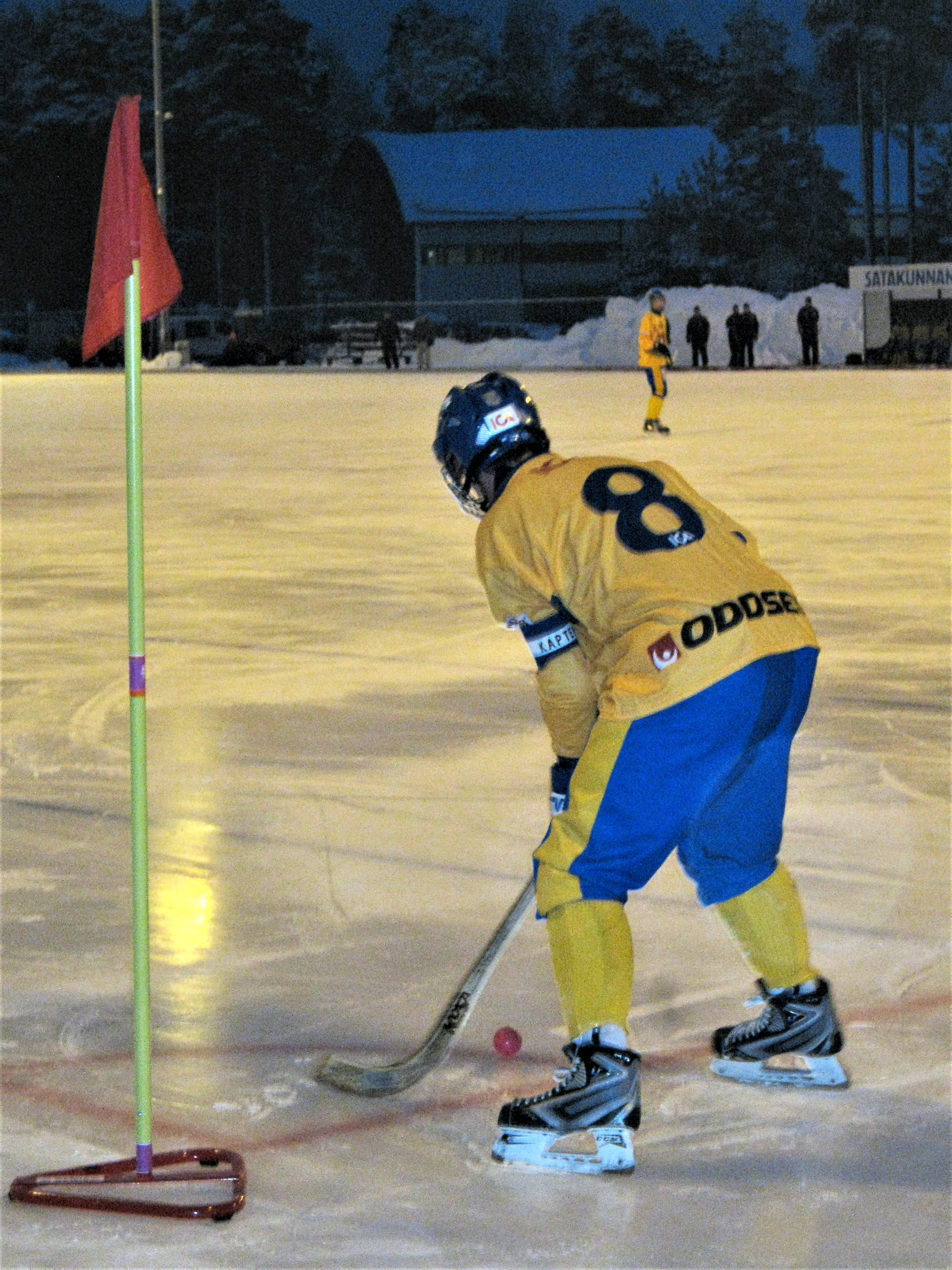
Swedish U17 player on a corner stroke

Under the rules, the two basic states of play during a game are ball in play and ball out of play. From the beginning of each playing period with a stroke-off (a set strike from the centre-spot by one team) until the end of the playing period, the ball is in play at all times, except when either the ball leaves the field of play, or play is stopped by the referee. When the ball becomes out of play, play is restarted by one of six restart methods depending on how it went out of play:

- Stroke-off
- Goal-throw
- Corner stroke
- Free-stroke
- Penalty shot
- Face-off

If the time runs out while a team is preparing for a free-stroke or penalty, the strike should still be made but it must go into the goal by one shot to count as a goal. Similarly, a goal made via a corner stroke should be allowed, but it must be executed using only one shot in addition to the strike needed to put the ball in play.

=== Free-strokes and penalty shots ===
Free-strokes can be awarded to a team if a player of the opposite team breaks any rule, for example, by hitting with the stick against the opponent's stick or skates. Free-strokes can also be awarded upon incorrect execution of corner-strikes, free-strikes, goal-throws, and so on, or the use of incorrect equipment, such as a broken stick.

Rather than stopping play, the referee may allow play to continue when its continuation will benefit the team against which an offence has been committed. This is known as "playing an advantage". The referee may "call back" play and penalise the original offence if the anticipated advantage does not ensue within a short period of time, typically taken to be four to five seconds. Even if an offence is not penalised because the referee plays an advantage, the offender may still be sanctioned (see below) for any associated misconduct at the next stoppage of play.

If a defender violently attacks an opponent within the penalty area, a penalty shot is awarded. Certain other offences, when carried out within the penalty area, for instance a defender holding or hooking an attacker, or blocking a goal situation with a lifted skate, thrown stick or glove and so on result in a penalty shot. Also, the defenders (with the exception of the goal-keeper) are not allowed to kneel or lie on the ice. The final offences that might mandate a penalty shot are those of hitting or blocking an opponent's stick or touching the ball with the hands, arms, stick or head. A 10-minute penalty or a red card may be issued to the offending player as well.

=== Warnings and penalties ===
Yellow: warning, White: 5 minutes penalty, Blue: 10 minutes penalty, Red: match penalty

A yellow card indicates a warning given to an entire team for technical fouls such as errors in the execution of goal-throws or free strokes, or the obstruction of a player without ball. Subsequent technical fouls by the same team result in a five-minute penalty indicated by a white card. A five-minute penalty is traditionally indicated using a white card but today the card is rarely shown, rather an announcement from the match secretary or the referee is used instead. In a similar manner, traditionally a ten-minute penalty is indicated by use of a blue card. A ten-minute penalty can be given for protesting or behaving incorrectly, attacking an opponent violently or stopping the ball incorrectly to get an advantage.

The third time a player receives a time penalty, it will be a personal penalty, meaning he or she will miss the remainder of the match. A substitute can enter the field after five or ten minutes, depending on the type of time penalty received. A full game penalty can be received upon using abusive language or directly attacking an opponent and means that the player can neither play nor be substituted for the remainder of the game. A match penalty is indicated through the use of a red card.

=== Offside ===
The offside rule effectively limits the ability to attack players to remain forward (i.e. closer to the opponent's goal-line) of the ball, the second-to-last defending player (which can include the goalkeeper), and the half-way line. This rule is in general similar to that of soccer.

== Equipment ==
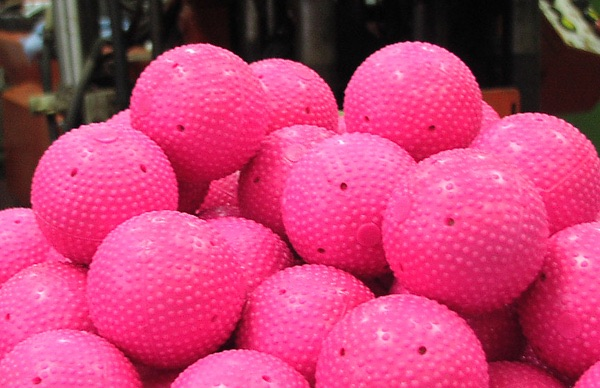
Bandy balls have a rubber or plastic coating and should be orange or, like here, cerise coloured. Historically, red balls with a tightly spun textile cover were used.

The basic equipment players are required to wear includes a pair of bandy skates, a helmet, a mouthguard and, in the case of the goalkeeper, a faceguard.

The teams must wear uniforms that make it easy to distinguish the two teams. The goalkeeper wears distinct colours to be singled out from his or her teammates, just as in football. The ice skates, sticks and any tape on the stick must be of another colour than the bandy ball, which is orange or cerise.

In addition to the aforementioned items, various pieces of gear are used to protect the knees, elbows, genitals and throat. The pants and gloves may contain padding.

=== Bandy ball ===
The core of the ball is made of cork and is surrounded by rubber or rubber-like plastic. Balls should be manufactured in a diameter of 62.4 or 63.8 mm (2.46 or 2.51 in) (the latter is called a "Russian ball"). Originally, bandy balls were red, then later became orange or cerise. According to the Bandy Playing Rules set up by the Federation of International Bandy, any of these are allowed, but all balls used in one game must be of the same colour and type.

=== Bandy stick ===
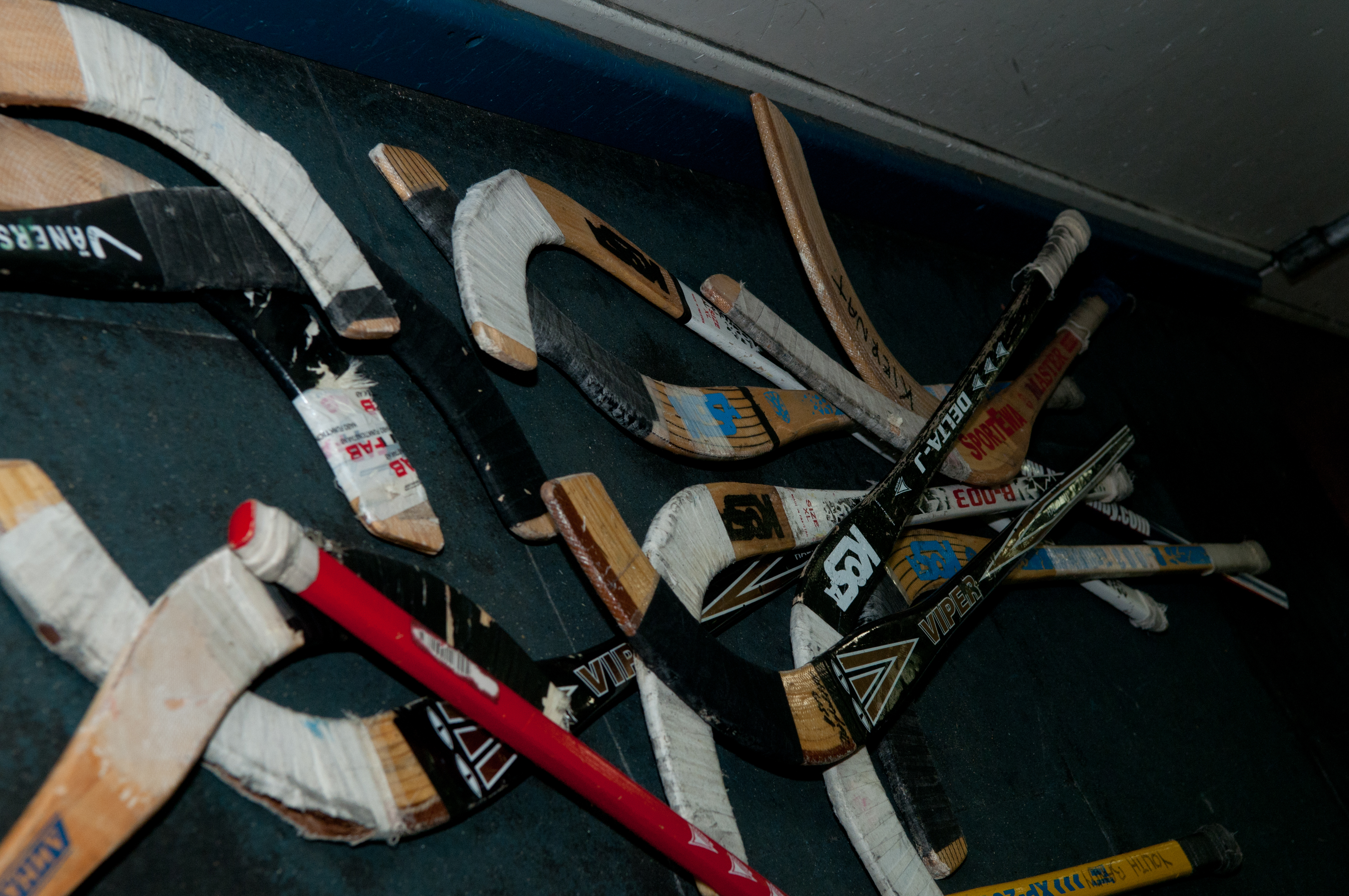
A collection of different bandy sticks

The stick used in bandy is an essential part of the sport. It should be made of an approved material such as wood or a similar material and should not contain any metal or sharp parts which can hurt the surrounding players.

Sticks are crooked and are available in five angles, where 1 has the smallest bend and 5 has the most. Bend 4 is the most common size in professional bandy.

The bandy stick should not have similar colours to the ball, such as orange or pink; it should be no longer than 127 centimetres (50 in), and no wider than 7 centimetres (2.8 in).

=== Bandy field ===
Standard field measurements

A bandy field is 45–65 metres (148–213 ft) by 90–110 metres (300–360 ft), a total of 4,050–7,150 square metres (43,600–77,000 sq ft), or about the same size as a football pitch and considerably larger than an ice hockey rink, which is 25–30 metres (82–98 ft) by 60 metres (200 ft). Along the sidelines a 15 cm (6 in) high border (vant, sarg, wand, wall) is placed to prevent the ball from leaving the ice. It should not be attached to the ice, to glide upon collisions, and should end 1–3 metres (3 ft 3 in – 9 ft 10 in) away from the corners.

Centered at each shortline is a 3.5 m (11 ft) wide and 2.1 m (6 ft 11 in) high goal cage and in front of the cage is a half-circular penalty area with a 17 m (56 ft) radius. A penalty spot is located 12 metres (39 ft) in front of the goal and there are two free-stroke spots at the penalty area line, each surrounded by a 5 m (16 ft) circle.

A centre spot with a circle of radius 5 m (16 ft) denotes the center of the field. A centre-line is drawn through the centre spot parallel with the shortlines.

At each of the corners, a 1 m (3 ft 3 in) radius quarter-circle is drawn, and a dotted line is painted parallel to the shortline and 5 metres (16 ft) away from it without extending into the penalty area. The dotted line can be replaced with a 0.5-metre (1 ft 8 in) long line starting at the edge of the penalty area and extending towards the sideline, 5 metres (16 ft) from the shortline.

The goal cage used in bandy is3.5 m (11 ft) wide and 2.1 metres (6 feet 11 inches) high and is the largest one used by any organized winter team sport.

=== Protective equipment ===
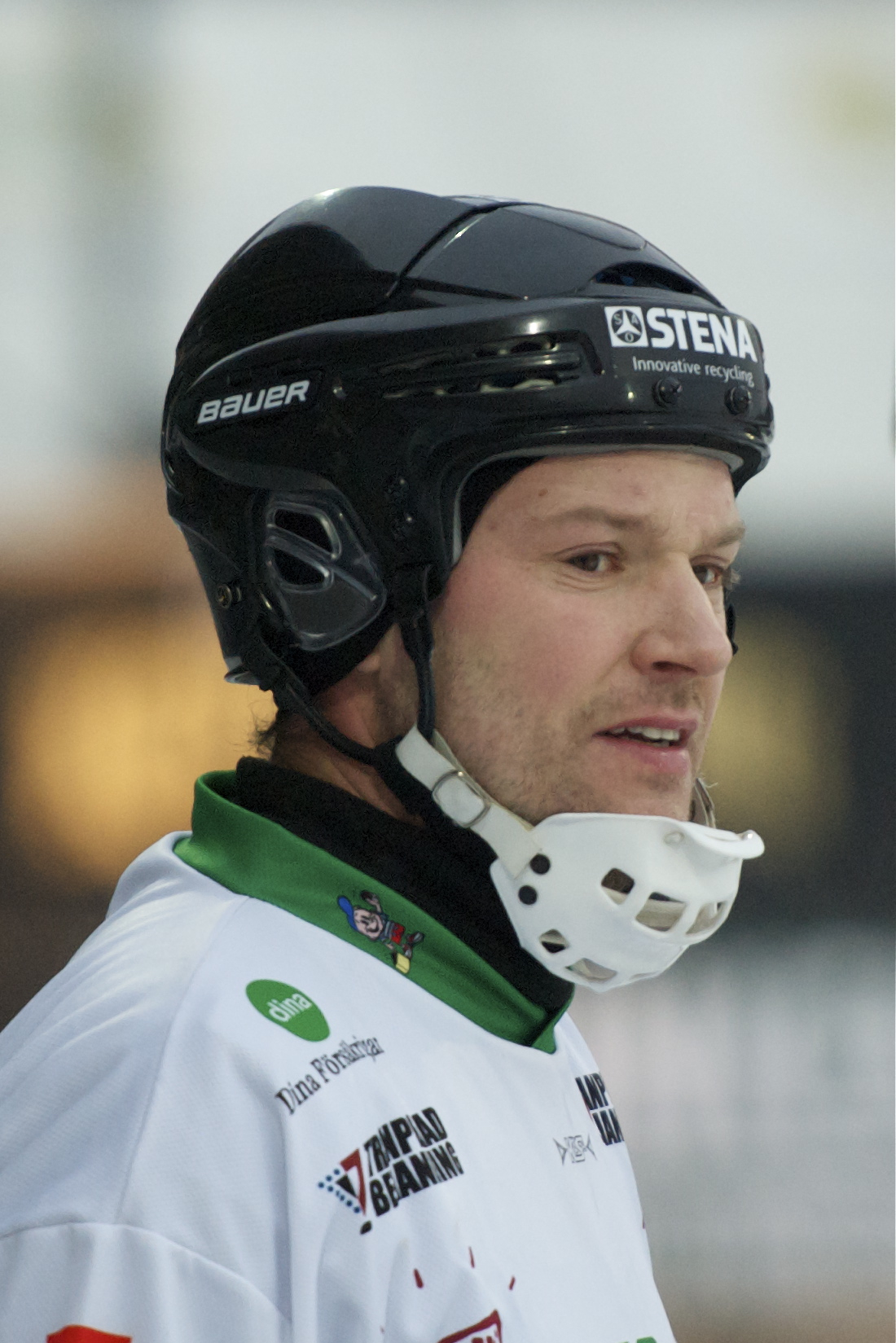
Magnus Muhrén with a bandy helmet and chinguard

Bandy players require protective equipment, some of which is designed specifically for the sport such as the bandy chinguard. Equipment is similar to that worn in ice hockey but is typically smaller, lighter, and more flexible, and more closely resembles the equipment worn in the modern sport of ringette.

All players are required to wear helmets. While some bandy players are required to wear facemasks such as young players, some outfield players only wear a helmet with a bandy chin guard. Goaltenders are the exception and must wear a helmet and facemask at all times.

== International ==
=== International games in the early years ===
The first international games were played by club teams in the 1890s.

Starting in the first decade of the 20th century, friendlies were played between national teams of some European countries. While games like this did not take place in central and western Europe after the 1910s, the Nordic countries of Estonia, Finland, Norway, and Sweden continued, doing it more regularly during the 1920s and 1930s with annually or semi-annually recurring friendlies between some of them.

Sweden tried to arrange for friendly games against the Soviet Union in the latter half of the 1940s, but it did not come to be until the mid-1950s.

=== Nordic Games ===
Bandy was played as one of the sports at the Nordic Games, international winter sports events held during the first few decades of the 20th century.

=== International federation ===
The Fédération internationale de hockey sur glace, or International Ice Hockey Federation as it is more well known as today, was founded in 1908 and was governing some bandy competitions in its early years, before only concentrating on ice hockey.

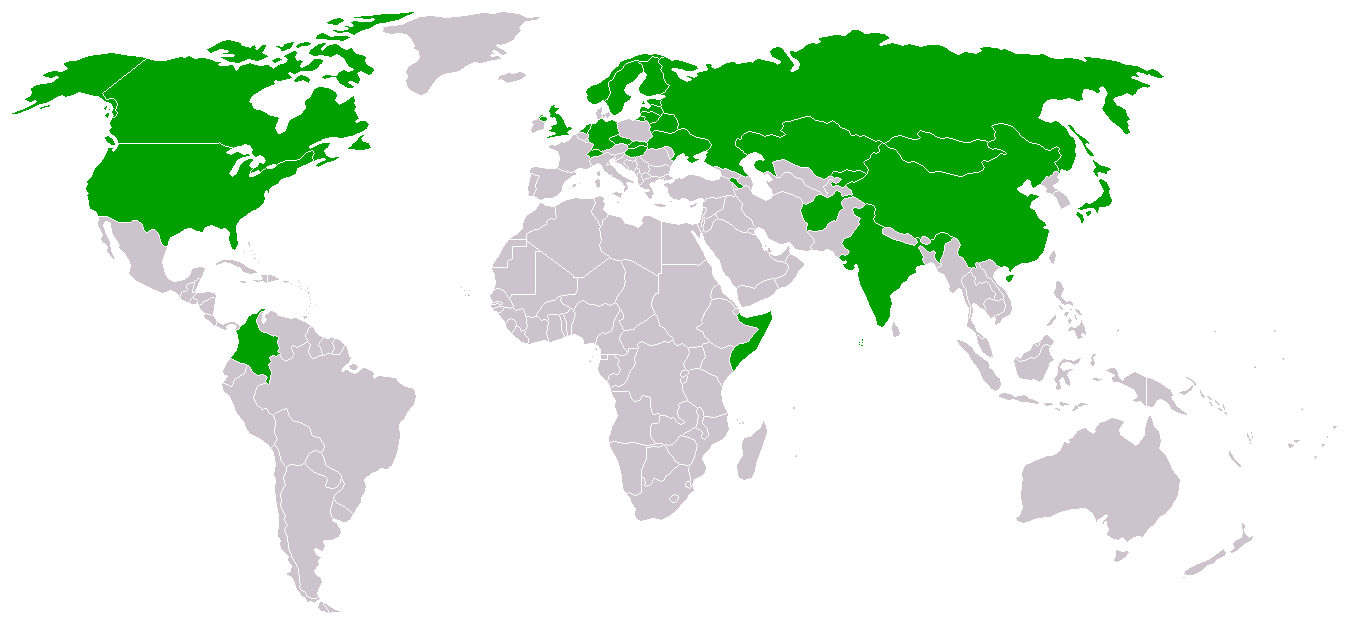
World map showing the 27 Federation of International Bandy members as of May 2017

The Federation of International Bandy (FIB) was formed as International Bandy Federation in 1955 and has had 33 members at most, each representing a country where bandy is played. Currently, there are 27 members of the federation. The name of the federation was changed to the present one in 2001 after the International Olympic Committee approved it as a so-called "recognized sport". The abbreviation "IBF" was at the time already used by another recognized sports federation, and IOC considers it important that the official abbreviations of sports federations are unique, so that the federations are not mistaken for one another.

In 2004, FIB was fully accepted by IOC. FIB is now a member of Association of IOC Recognised International Sports Federations.

=== World Championships ===
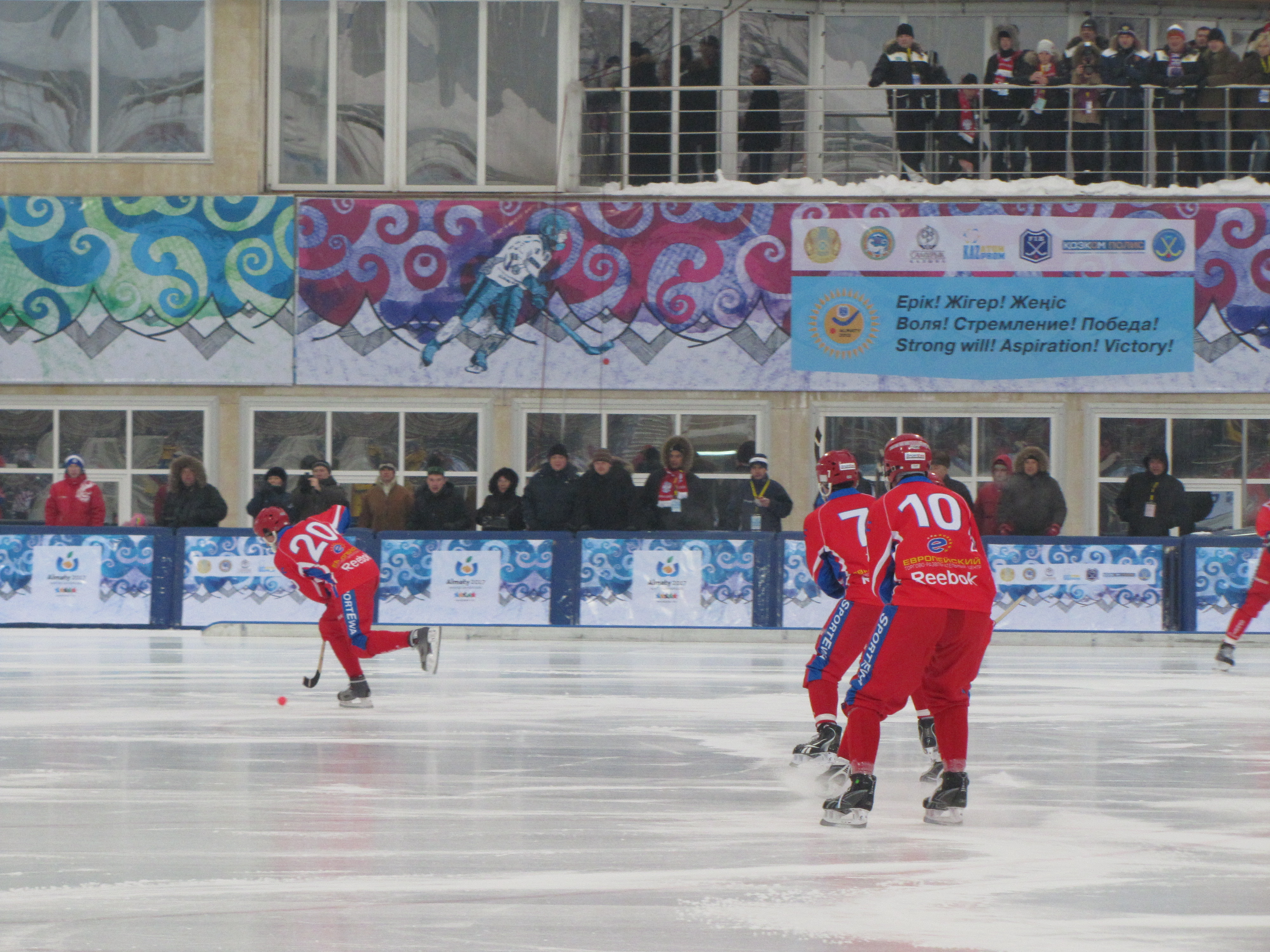
Russia in the men's World Championships 2012

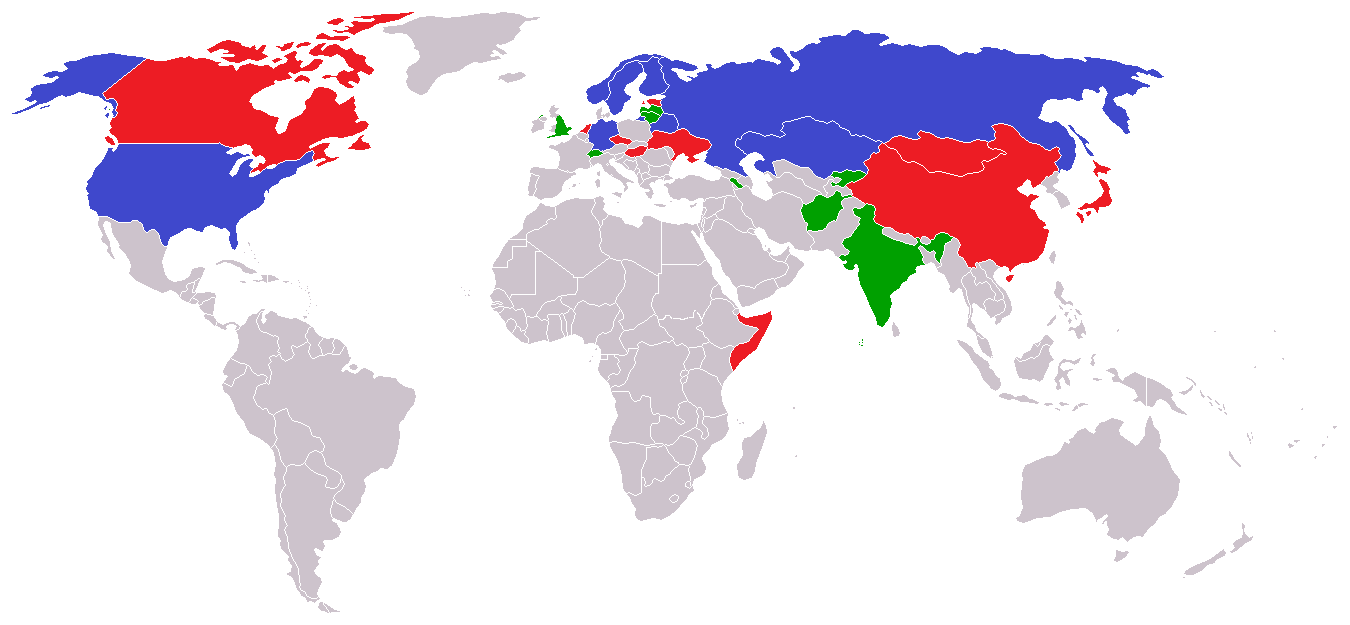
A record eighteen countries participated in the World Championships of 2016 and 2017. Blue means Division A countries, red Division B countries as of the 2017 tournament and green the other FIB members. Latvia, which was relegated from Division A in 2016, made a late cancellation in 2017.

==== Men ====
The Bandy World Championship for men is arranged by the FIB and was first held in 1957. It was held every two years starting in 1961, and every year since 2003.

Currently, the record number of countries participating in the World Championships is twenty (2019). Since the number of countries playing bandy is not large, every country which can set up a team is welcome to take part in the World Championship. The quality of the teams varies; however, with only six nations, Sweden, the Soviet Union, Russia, Finland, Norway, and Kazakhstan, having won medals (allowing for the fact that Russia's team took over from the Soviet Union in 1993). Finland won the 2004 world championship in Västerås, Sweden, while all other championships have been won by Sweden, the Soviet Union and Russia.

The Soviet Union won all championships until 1981, when Sweden managed to break the streak of eleven straight gold medals. Sweden won again in the next tournament in 1983, but Soviet again seized the victory in 1985. The Soviet Union also won at its last two appearances, and then Sweden won in 1993, 1995 and 1997. Russia, having taken over after the Soviet Union, and Sweden have kept on winning all championships between them except for 2004, when Finland managed to claim the win.

In 2020, the B division of the World Championship was played, but the A division – which was to be played about a month later – was first postponed a couple of times due to the outbreak of the COVID-19 pandemic and later moved to the next year as the pandemic did not end. The championship tournament could however not be played in 2021 either. In 2022, the championship was finally to be held, but since it was scheduled to be played in Russia, many national federations said they did not want to participate because of the 2022 Russian invasion of Ukraine and it was cancelled by the FIB since this meant there would have been too few competing teams.

==== Women ====
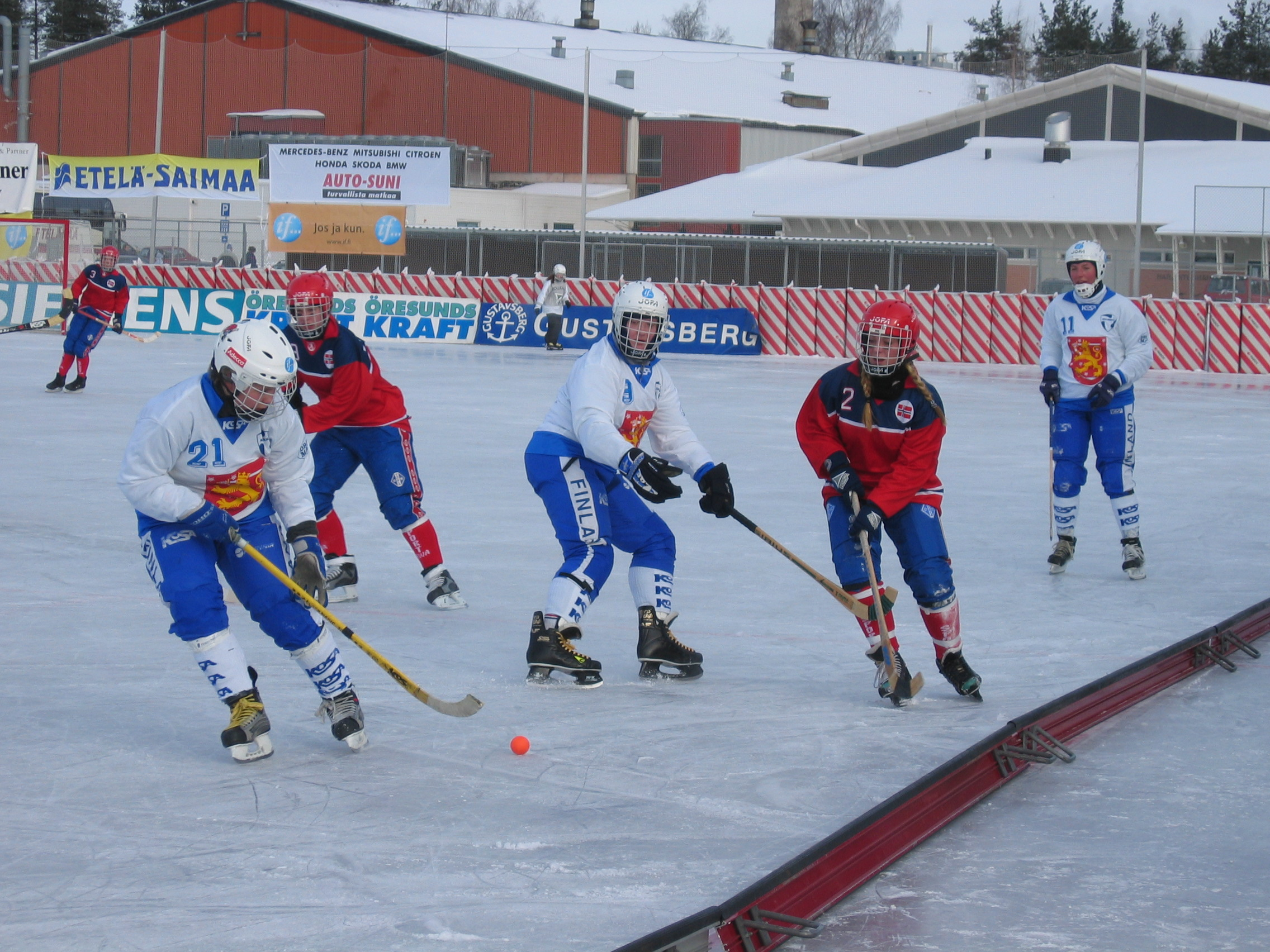
Finland and Norway at the 2004 Women's World Championships in Lappeenranta

The first World Championship for women took place in February 2004 in Lappeenranta, Finland. Sweden won the championship without conceding a goal. In the 2014 women's World Championship Russia won for the first time, defeating Sweden, making it the first time Sweden did not win the world title. In 2016 Sweden took the title back.

The 2018 women's tournament was played in a country situated completely in Asia for the first time, when it was hosted in Chengde, China. It was the same for the men's tournament that same year (the area north and west of the Ural River is located in Europe, thus Kazakhstan, which had hosted a world championship before, is a transcontinental country), when Harbin hosted the 2018 Division B tournament.

The 2020 championship saw China withdraw its participation due to the COVID-19 pandemic, but the tournament was held in Norway in February and the pandemic had not yet reached Europe. In 2022 when the championship was played in Sweden, China did not yet return, while Russia and Ukraine both withdrew because of the 2022 Russian invasion of Ukraine.

==== Youth ====
There are also Youth Bandy World Championships in different age groups for boys and young men and in one age group for girls. The oldest group is the under 23 championship, Bandy World Championship Y-23.

=== Olympic Movement ===
During most of the 20th century, a host nation for Olympic Games had the right to arrange demonstration games for almost any sport of its own choosing. In 1952, the Winter Olympic Games were arranged in Oslo, Norway, and the Norwegians presented bandy as a demonstration sport. The tournament of bandy at the 1952 Winter Olympics was played by three countries, Norway, Finland and Sweden. This is the only time bandy has been played at Olympic Games.

Bandy was officially recognized by the International Olympic Committee (IOC) under the Association of IOC Recognised International Sports Federations (ARISF) in 2004, and was played as a demonstration sport at the 1952 Winter Olympics in Oslo. However, it has yet to officially be played at the Olympics.

According to the FIB, bandy is the world's second-most participated winter sport after ice hockey based on the number of participating athletes. It is unclear how many of the players participate in the male category and how many in the female category. The FIB has also recorded bandy (men's) as having ranked as the number two winter sport in terms of tickets sold per day of competitions at the sport's world championship.

However, compared with the seven Winter Olympic sports, bandy's popularity among other winter sports across the globe is considered by the International Olympic Committee to have a, "gap between popularity and participation and global audiences", which is a roadblock to future Olympic inclusion.

In addition, the Olympic Charter requires a sport to be widely practiced by men in at least 75 countries and on four continents, and by women in no fewer than 40 countries and on three continents in order to be accepted.

FIB president Boris Skrynnik lobbied for bandy to be included in the 2014 Winter Olympics in Sochi, given Russia's prominence in the sport. Members of the Chinese Olympic Committee were present at the 2017 world championships to meet with Skrynnik about the possibility of considering the sport for the 2022 Winter Olympics in Beijing. However, in 2018 it was announced no new sports would be added for 2022.

==== Asian Winter Games ====
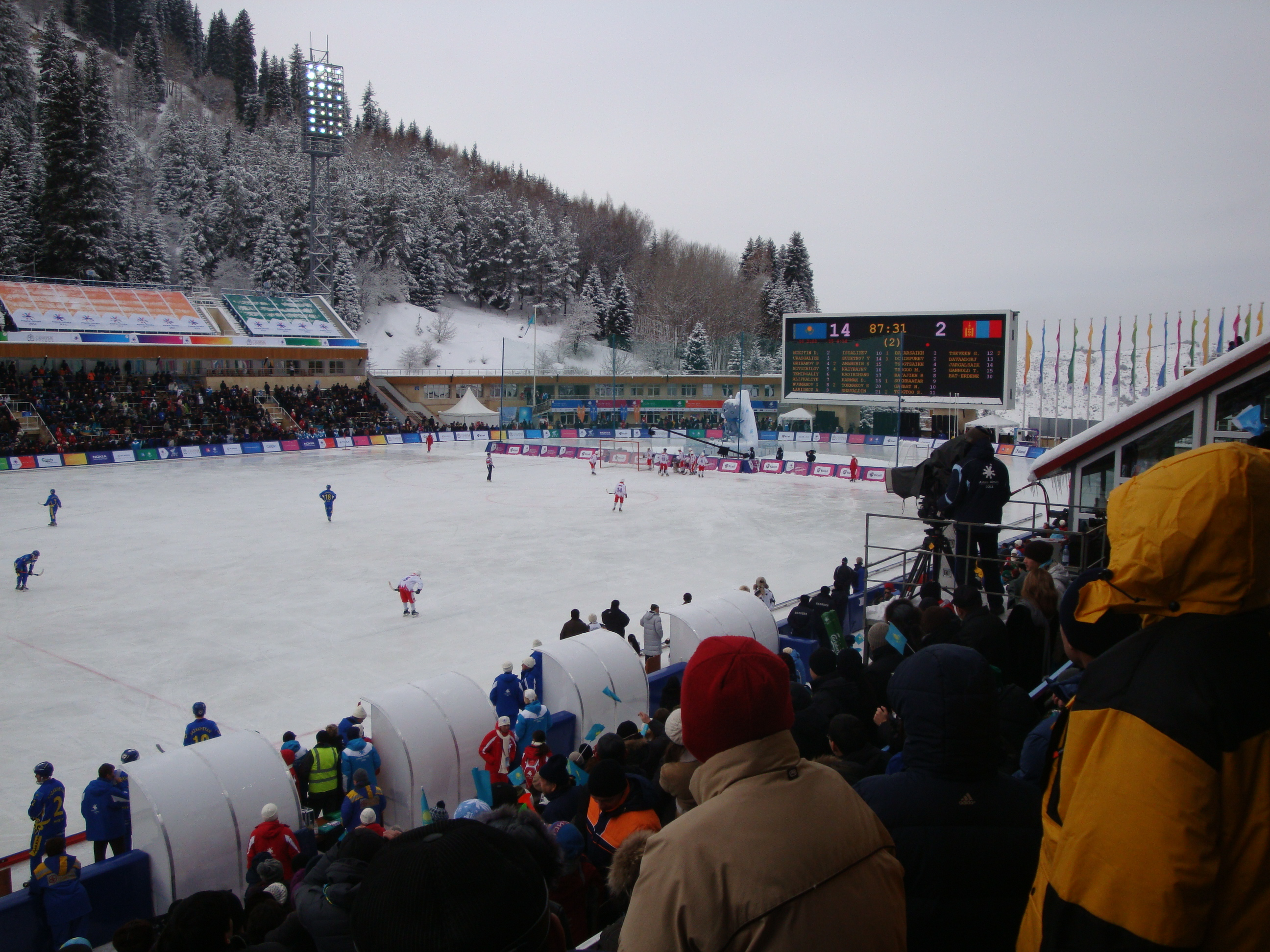
The final of the bandy tournament at Asian Winter Games at Medeu between Kazakhstan and Mongolia

At the 2011 Asian Winter Games, open to members of the Olympic Council of Asia, men's bandy was included for the first time. Three teams contested the inaugural competition, and Kazakhstan won the gold medal. The President of Kazakhstan, Nursultan Nazarbayev, attended the final.

There was no bandy competition at the next Games, the 2017 Asian Winter Games held in Japan.

=== Winter Universiade/Winter World University Games ===
Bandy made its debut at the Winter Universiade during the 2019 Games in Krasonyarsk, Russia. Originally a six-team tournament for men and a four-team tournament for women were planned to be held. However, later China withdrew from the men's tournament and was supposed to be replaced by Belarus. Since that did not happen either, participating teams among women were Russia, Sweden, Norway and the United States, while among men Russia, Sweden, Norway, Finland and Kazakhstan.

In 2019, the International University Sports Federation expected bandy to be a part of the 2023 Winter World University Games (Winter World University Games being the new name of the Winter Universiade) too, however, this did not turn out to be so, as the hosts in Lake Placid, USA, did not included it in its schedules and no bandy teams were invited to the games.

=== World Cup ===
The World Championships should not be confused with the annual Bandy World Cup competitions. The World Cup is for club teams.

==== Men ====
The Bandy World Cup for men in Ljusdal, Sweden, has been played annually since the 1970s and is the biggest bandy tournament for elite-level club teams. It is played indoors in Sandviken since 2009 because Ljusdal has no indoor arena. It is expected to return to Ljusdal once an indoor arena has been built. World Cup matches are played day and night, and the tournament is played in four days in late October. The teams participating are mostly, and some years exclusively, from Sweden and Russia, which has the two best leagues in the world.

The COVID-19 pandemic led to the Cup being cancelled in 2020 and 2021.

==== Women ====
There is also a club competition for women's bandy teams called Bandy World Cup Women. Its inaugural year was in 2007.

=== European Cup ===
The European Cup was first played in 1974 and was a competition featuring the national men's champion team from any European country which had a national bandy championship. This meant, at the time, that only four teams competed every year, which were the men's champions from Finland, Norway, the Soviet Union, and Sweden. After the Soviet Union had been dissolved in 1991, the Russian champions took part instead. The cup is not formally defunct, but the last installment was played in 2009.

=== 4 Nations Tournament ===
The Federation of International Bandy usually arranges a four nations tournament every year between national teams from Norway, Finland, Russia and Sweden. The 2022 tournament was originally set for 21–23 January, but was cancelled after the Swedish Bandy Association announced they would not be hosting it for that season.

=== Rossiya Tournament (Russian Government Cup) ===
During the period 1972–1990, the Rossiya Tournament was held semi-annually for national teams in the years when there was no world championship. This tournament was always played in the Soviet Union and arranged by the newspaper Sovetskaya Rossiya. It was affectionately called "the small world championship". From 1992 the tournament was renamed Russian Government Cup. The last instalment was played in 2012.

=== European Bandy Championship ===
There has likely never been any European Championship played in bandy. Some sources describe a 1913 European Bandy Championships as having been held in February 1913, in Switzerland, at the same time as the bandy tournament at the 1913 Nordic Games. However, this European Championship tournament likely never happened, or is a conflation of titles, since no contemporary sources have been found.

== Overview of international competitions ==
There are several existing international bandy competitions with events varying based upon age, competitive level, and sex.

=== Senior ===
Senior competition (adult)
Sex	Event	Age
Men's competition	Bandy World Championship (international)	Men's International (adult)
Men's competition	Bandy World Cup (club)	Men's Club (adult)
Women's competition	Women's Bandy World Championship (international)	Women's International (adult)
Women's competition	Bandy World Cup Women (club)	Women's Club (adult)

=== Junior ===
Youth and Under 23 competition (youth/young adult)
Sex	Event	Age
Youth Bandy World Championship; Young men's competition
Youth Bandy World Championship; Young men's competition	World Championship Y15	Boys under 15
Youth Bandy World Championship; Young men's competition	World Championship Y17	Boys under 17
Youth Bandy World Championship; Young men's competition	World Championship Y19	Boys under 19
Youth Bandy World Championship; Young men's competition	World Championship Y21/Y23	Young men under 23
Youth Bandy World Championship; Young women's competition	Bandy World Championship G-17 a.k.a. F17 WC	Girls under 17

== Variants of bandy and sports developed from bandy ==
=== 7-a-side bandy ===
Varieties of bandy exist, utilising the same rules only with slight differences, like seven-a-side bandy with regulation sized goal cages but without corner strokes and often on a smaller sized rink. Seven-a-side bandy was popular in central Europe and in England in the late 19th and early 20th centuries, while eleven-a-side bandy was preferred in the Nordic countries and in Russia. Seven-a-side bandy rules were applied at the Davos Cup in 2016.

=== Rink bandy ===
Rink bandy is a bandy variant played on an ice hockey-size rink. It was originally conceived as a way of practicing bandy in the summertime, when there were no bandy sized indoor rinks but ice hockey rinks had started to be built indoors. Rink bandy is played by basically the same rules as regular bandy but on a playing surface the size of an ice hockey rink with ice hockey goal cages and six players on each team (or five in the case of the USA Rink Bandy League).

There have been international competitions for rink bandy played by the best bandy players in the 1980s and 1990s, both for club teams and for national teams, there were world championships in rink bandy in those days and the Hofors World Cup for clubs was played annually from 1984 to 1998. When more indoor bandy rinks have been built, rink bandy has more become a sport for lower league teams and recreational play.

Rink bandy was played in the 2012 European Company Sports Games program.

Some member nations of the Federation of International Bandy, which is the international governing body for rink bandy as well as bandy, do not have regulation sized bandy surfaces which are larger than the more common ice hockey ice rink and therefore only play rink bandy at home; this includes most of the World Championships Group B participants.

=== Short bandy ===
In the Czech Republic, the national federation has developed its own version of rink bandy with somewhat different rules, which is meant to help the players transition to playing on a full-sized bandy rink. This is called short bandy. Read more in the section below.

=== Rinkball ===
Rink bandy has in turn led to the creation of the sport of rinkball. The sport of rinkball has at times been referred to as a variant of bandy, however it organized by the 1980s and has since become an established organized sport with its own governing body and differs considerably from both bandy and ice hockey, the sport's two major influences.

=== Floorball ===
Bandy is also the predecessor of floorball, which was invented when people started playing with plastic bandy shaped sticks and lightweight balls when running on the floors of indoor gym halls.⁣

=== Landbandy ===
In Sweden, informal games played like bandy but on ice-free ground (usually on gravel or asphalt concrete) are called landbandy. The term should not be confused with landhockey, the Swedish term for field hockey.

=== No roller or parasport variants exist ===
There is no formal roller sport companion to bandy involving either inline skates or parallel wheel roller skates, even if rink hockey can be considered to have some similarities with bandy. There is also no formally organized skateless ice variant of bandy, and bandy does not have any parasport variant.

== Countries ==
=== Canada ===
Bandy has been played in Canada since the 1980s, but is not nearly as popular as ice hockey in this country. Friendlies are played against the United States. The Canadian bandy federation is called Canada Bandy.

=== China ===
The China Bandy Federation was set up in 2014. Since them, China has since participated in a number of world championship tournaments, with men's, women's and youth teams. China Bandy is mainly financed by private resources. The development of the sport in China is supported by the Harbin Sport University.

=== Czech Republic ===
A team from Prague in present-day Czech Republic became Austrian national bandy champions in 1911.

Czech Republic has been playing in the World Championship since 2016. As a way of preparing as well as possible for international matches, the Czechs have invented modified rules for games on ice hockey rinks, a variety called short bandy, which differs from rink bandy. The Czech (former rink bandy) national league is now called Liga českého národního bandy.

=== Estonia ===
Bandy as an organized sport was played in Estonia in the 1910s to 1930s and the country had a national championship for some years. The national team played friendlies against Finland in the 1920s and 1930s. The sport was played sporadically during the Soviet occupation 1944–1991. It has since then become more organized again, partly through exchange with Finnish clubs and enthusiasts. As of 2018, Estonia takes part in both the Bandy World Championship for men, and the Women's Bandy World Championship.

=== Finland ===
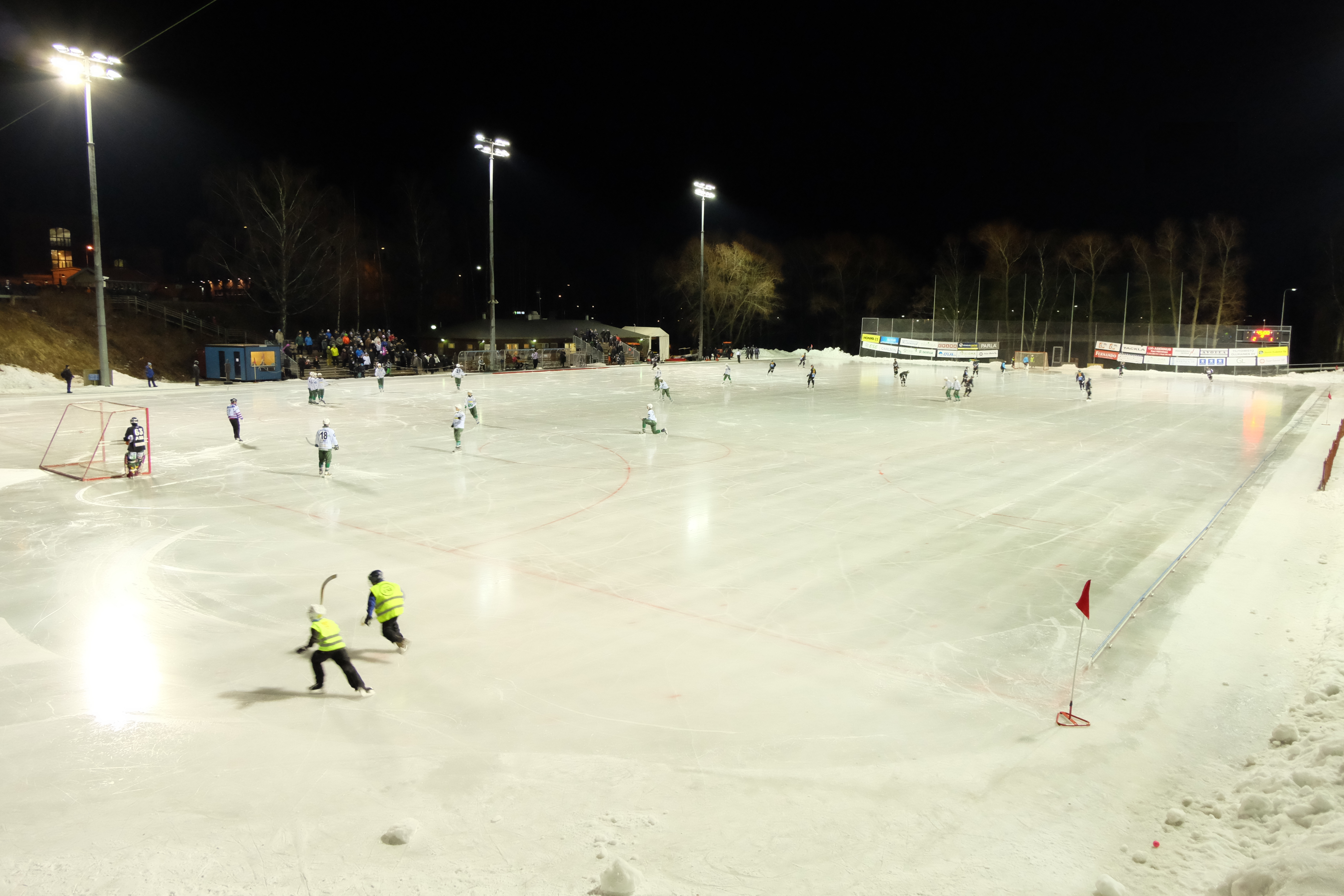
A match in Finland

Bandy as an organized sport was introduced to Finland from Russia in the 1890s. Finland has been playing bandy friendlies against Sweden and Estonia since its independence in 1917.

The first men's Finnish national championships were held in 1908 and was the first national Finnish championship held in any team sport. National champions have been named every year except for three years in the first half of the 20th century when Finland was at war. The top national league is called Bandyliiga and is semi-professional. The best players turn fully professional by being recruited by clubs in Sweden or Russia. As of the 2020–21 season, Bandyliiga consisted of the following teams: Akilles, Botnia-69, HIFK, JPS, Kampparit, Narukerä, OLS, Veiterä and WP 35.

Finland was an original member of the Federation of International Bandy and is the only country besides Russia/Soviet Union and Sweden to have won a Bandy World Championship, which it did in 2004.

The Federation of International Bandy (FIB) is planning for a major premiere for indoor bandy in Finland in 2023 with the venue taking place at an indoor arena in Lappeenranta. When the arena is ready, an international inauguration is to take place with a 4-nation bandy tournament. Participants will include teams from Russia, Sweden, Norway and Finland. The tournament is scheduled for 20–22 January 2023.

=== Germany ===
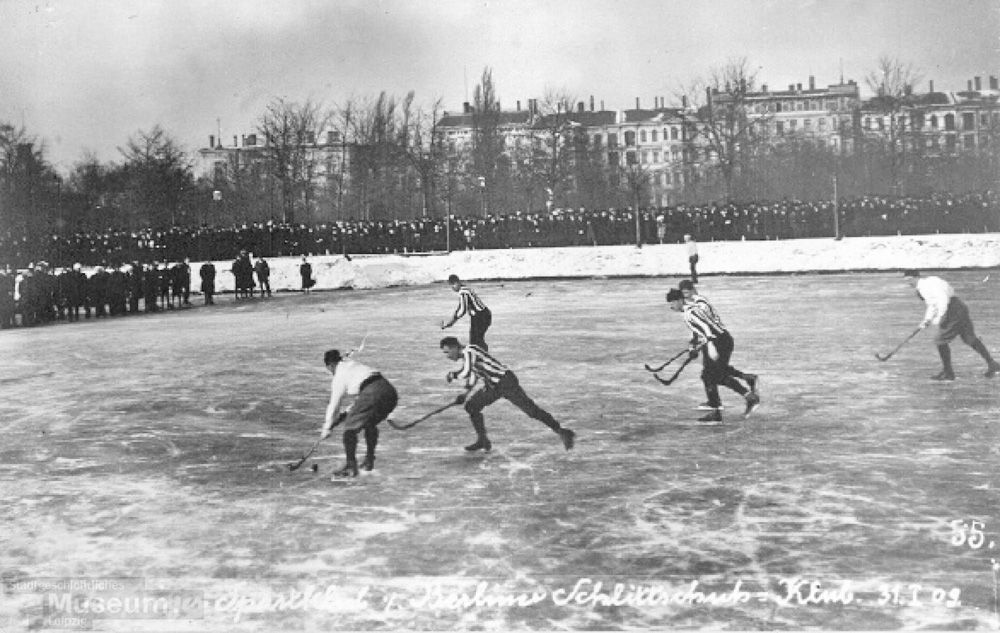
Match in Leipzig between LSC and Berliner Schlittschuh-Klub 1909

Bandy was played in Germany in the early 20th century, including by Crown Prince Wilhelm, but the interest died out in favour of ice hockey. The Leipziger Sportclub, which arguably had the best team, was also the last club to give bandy up. The sport was reintroduced to Germany in the 2010s, with the German Bandy Federation being founded in 2013. Germany has been participating in the Bandy World Championship, a competition for male competitors, since 2014.

=== India ===
Bandy is being played in northern parts of India close to the Himalayas, where there is usually cold weather and snow in the winter time. A national championship is contested every year, but India has yet to send a national team to the World Championships or any other international competition.

=== Kazakhstan ===
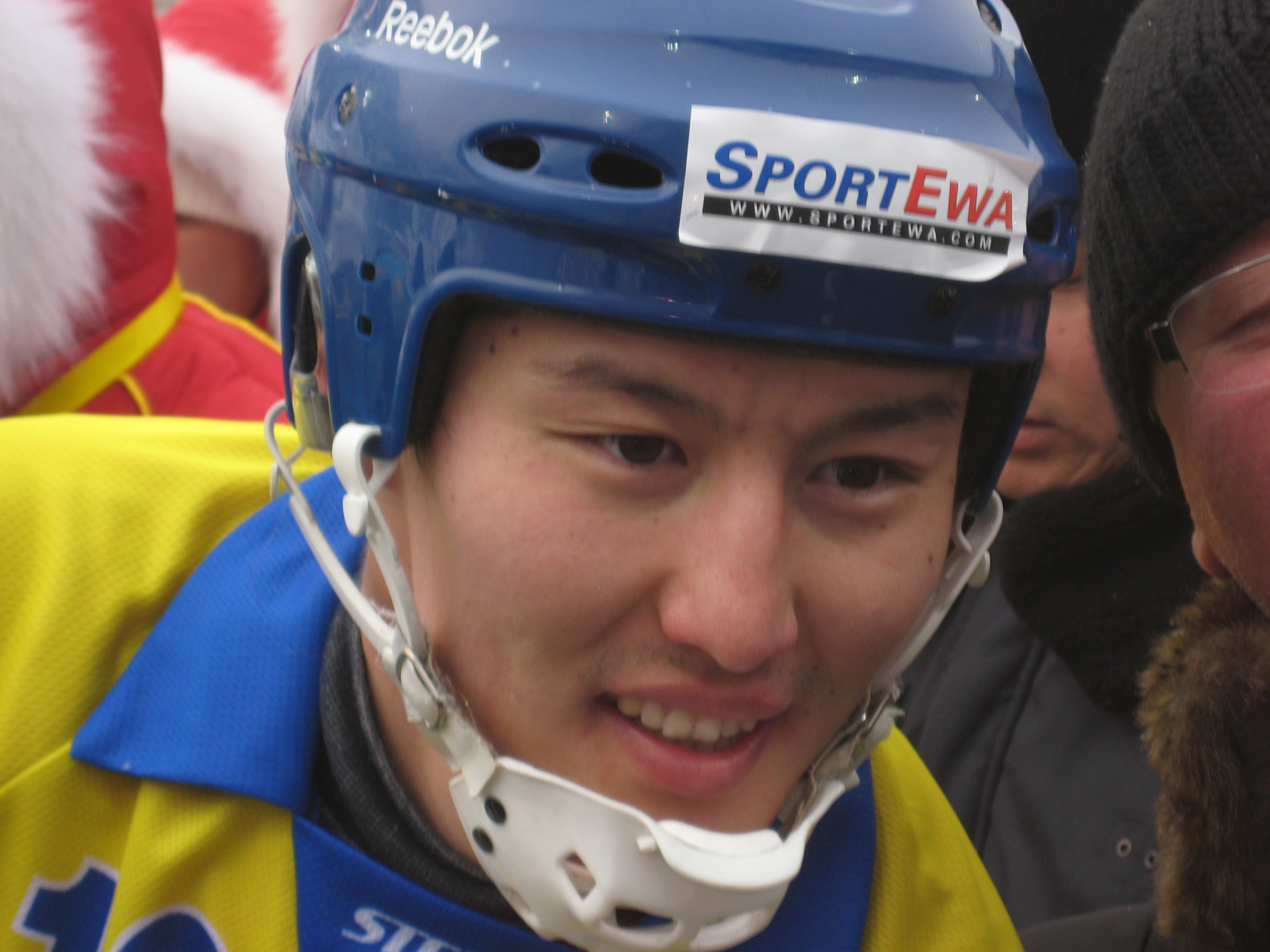
Rauan Isaliyev, captain of the Kazakhstan national bandy team

Bandy has a long history in many parts of Kazakhstan and it used to be one of the most popular sports in Soviet times. However, after independence it suffered a rapid decline in popularity and only remained in Oral (often called by the Russian name, "Uralsk"), where the country's only professional club Akzhaiyk is located. They presently compete in the Russian second tier division, the Russian Bandy Supreme League.

Recently bandy has started to gain popularity again outside of Oral, most notably in Petropavl and Khromtau. Those were for example the three Kazakh cities which had players in the team at the Youth-17, Youth Bandy World Championship for boys in 2016. The capital Astana has hosted national youth championships in rink bandy as well as championships in traditional eleven-a-side bandy.

In recent years the former capital Almaty has hosted both the Asian Winter Games (with bandy on the program) as well as the Bandy World Championship for men in which Kazakhstan finished 3rd. Plans are being made to reinvigorate the bandy section of the club Dynamo Almaty, who won the Soviet Championships in 1977 and 1990 as well as the European Cup in 1978. Almaty is also the home of the headquarters of the Asian Bandy Federation. Since bandy began regaining popularity and acceptance, the state has begun supporting bandy. Medeu in Almaty is the only arena with artificial ice. A second arena in Almaty was built for the World Championship 2012, but it was taken down afterwards. Stadion Yunost in Oral was supposed to get artificial ice for the 2017–18 season. It got delayed but in 2018 it was officially ready for use.

=== Mongolia ===
The national team took a silver medal at the 2011 Asian Winter Games, which led to being chosen as the best Mongolian sport team of 2011. Mongolia was proud to win the bronze medal of the B division at the 2017 Bandy World Championship after which the President of Mongolia, Tsakhiagiin Elbegdorj, held a reception for the team.

=== Netherlands ===
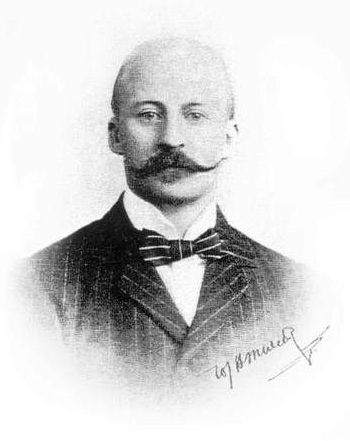
Pim Mulier introduced bandy to the Netherlands.

Bandy as an organized sport was introduced to the Netherlands in the 1890s by Pim Mulier and the sport became popular. However, in the 1920s, the interest turned to ice hockey, but in contrast to other countries in central and western Europe, the sport has been continuously played in the Netherlands and since the 1970s, the country has become a member of FIB and games have been more formalised again. The national team started to compete at the WCS in 1991. However, without a proper venue, only rink bandy is played within the country. The national governing body is the Bandy Bond Nederland.

=== Norway ===
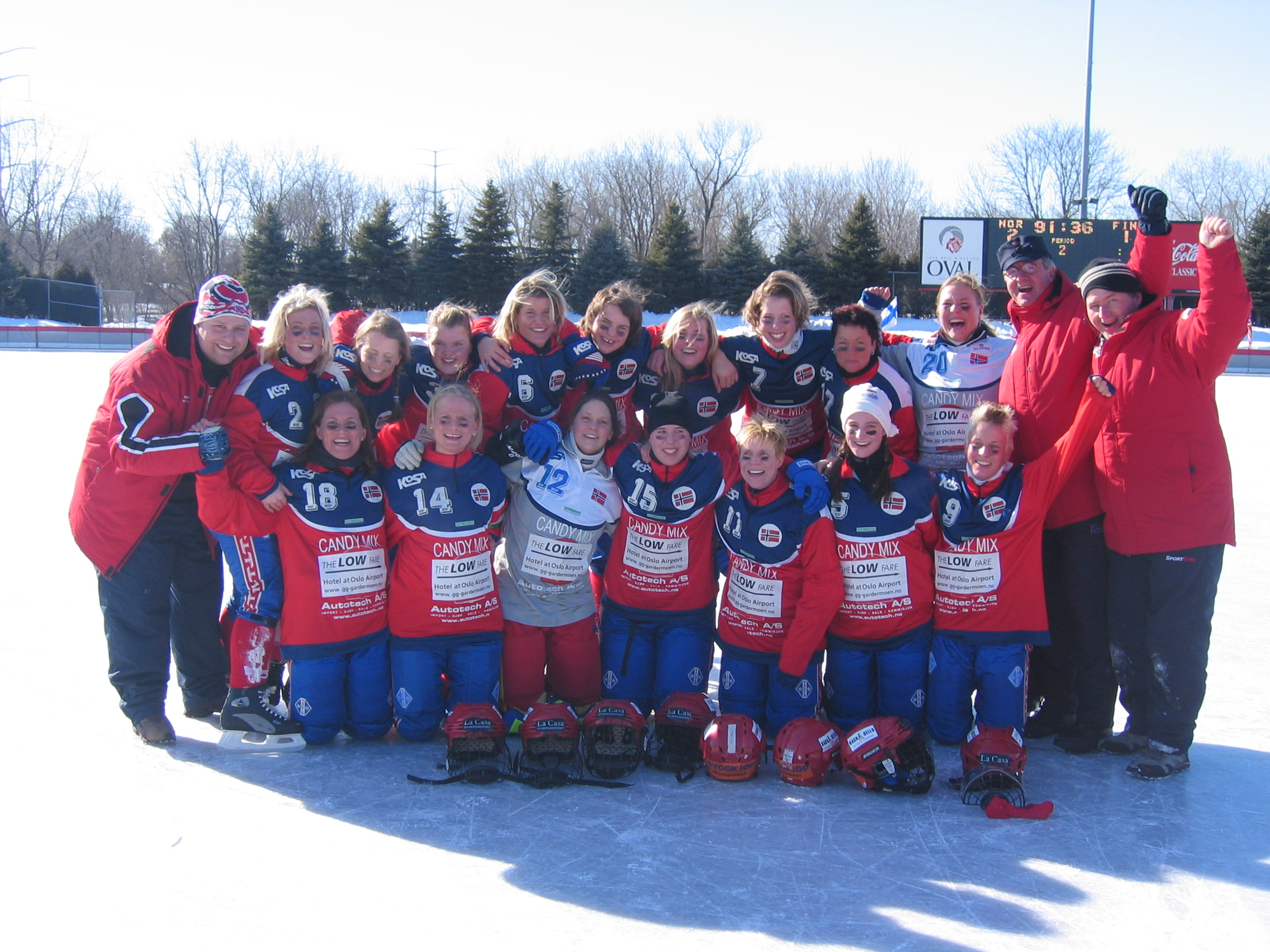
The Norwegian team celebrating the bronze medal in WCS 2006

Bandy as an organized sport was introduced to Norway in the 1910s. The Swedes contributed largely and clubs sprang up around the capital of Kristiania (present day Oslo). Oslo, including neighbouring towns, is in the twenty-first century still the region where bandy enjoys most popularity in Norway.

In 1912 the Norwegians played their first National Championship, which was played annually up to 1940. During World War II, when Norway was occupied by Germany, illegal bandy was played in hidden places in forests, on ponds and lakes. In 1943, 1944 and 1945, illegal championships were held. In 1946 legal play resumed and still goes on in form of the Norwegian Bandy Premier League (Eliteserien). After World War II the number of teams rose, as well as attendance which regularly were in the thousands, but mild winters in the 1970s and 1980s shrunk the league, and in 2003 only five clubs (teams) fought out the 1st division with low attendance numbers and little media coverage. As of 2021 there are 10 teams in the Norwegian Bandy Premier League.

Norway's best result in the World Championship is a second place in 1965.

==== Norwegian Championship ====
The Norwegian bandy champion is decided each year by a play-off among the best teams in the Norwegian Bandy Premier League. The first Norwegian bandy champions was decided in 1912 and the championship has been held almost every year since. Until 1928, the championship was played as 7-a-side bandy.

=== Russia ===
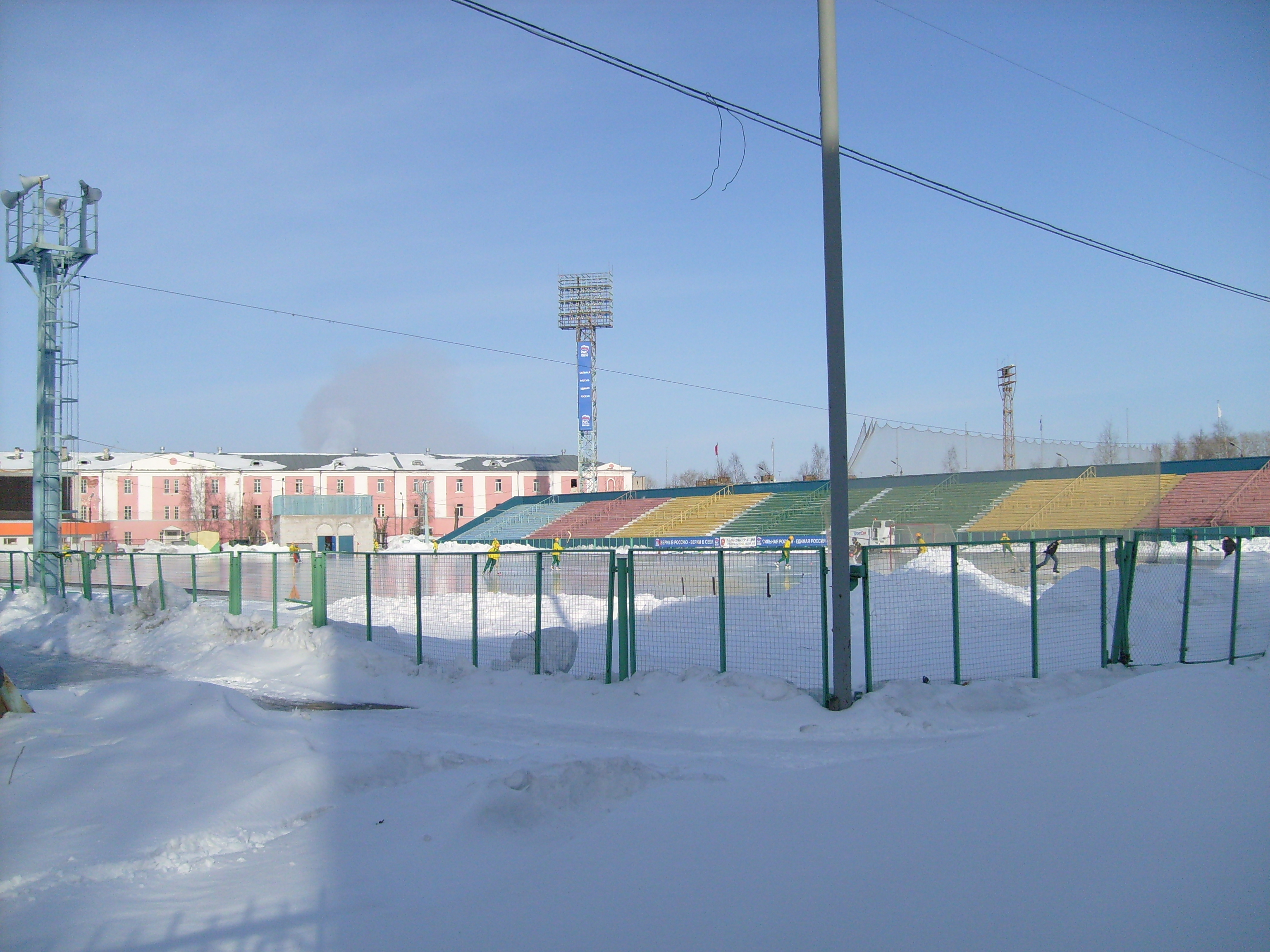
Trud Stadium in Arkhangelsk

In Russia bandy is known as hockey with a ball or simply Russian hockey. A similar game became popular among the Russian nobility in the early 1700s, with the imperial court of Peter the Great playing a predecessor of modern bandy on Saint Petersburg's frozen Neva river. Russians initially played this game using ordinary footwear with sticks made out of juniper wood, but it wasn't until later that ice skates were introduced. Bandy did not become popular among the masses throughout the Russian Empire until the second half of the 19th century. The predecessor of the current Russian Bandy Federation was founded in 1898. Bandy is considered a national sport in Russia and is the only discipline to have official support of the Russian Orthodox Church.

Traditionally the Russians used a longer skate blade than other nations, giving them the advantage of skating faster. However, they would find it more difficult to turn quickly. A bandy skate has a longer blade than an ice hockey skate, and the "Russian skate" is even longer.

Though bandy was still played in the Soviet Union after the Russian Revolution, they did not partake in any international games for many decades. While agreements had previously been made to play friendlies against Sweden in the late 1940s, these plans had not come to fruition. The bandy event at the 1952 Winter Olympics in Oslo, Norway, where men's bandy featured as a demonstration sport, was played without any Soviet team. However, the Soviets reconsidered their position following this competition.

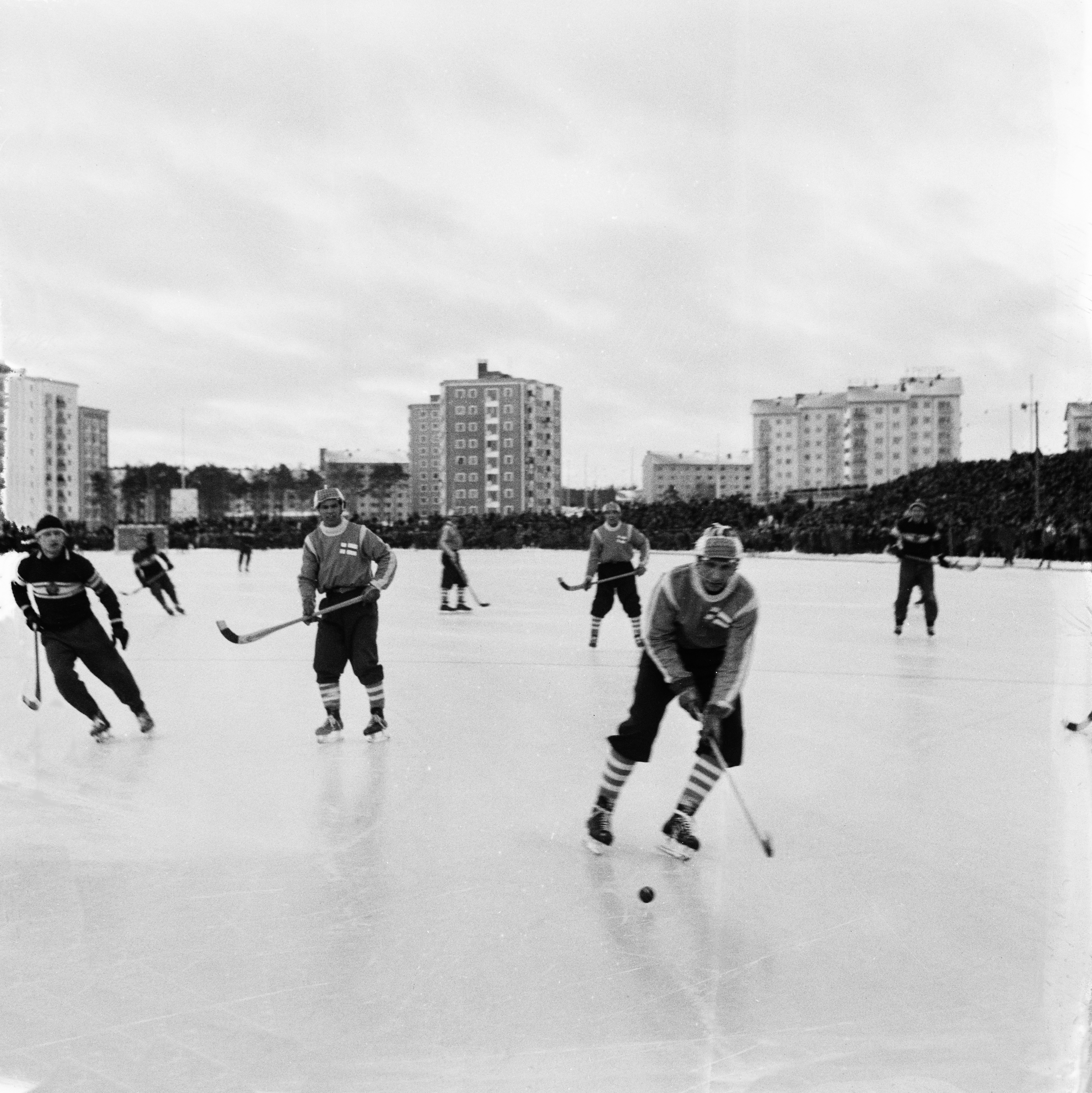
Finland - Soviet Union in 1959

When the Federation of International Bandy was formed in 1955, with the Soviet Union as one of its founding members, the Russians largely adopted the international rules of the game developed in England in the 19th century, with one notable exception. The other countries adopted the border which until then had only been used in Russia.

Since the 1950s, when the Soviet Union ended its isolation and started to take part in international sports events, the Soviet Union and then Russia (as its successor country in 1991) has consistently held a top position in the sport of bandy, both as a founding nation of the International Federation in 1955, and fielding the most successful team in the Bandy World Championship, the premiere international competition for men, (when counting the previous Soviet Union team and Russia together).

The men's Russian professional bandy league is called the Russian Bandy Super League. The Russian Bandy Supreme League is the second tier of men's Russian bandy, below the Russian Bandy Super League. In Sweden, the Elitserien (literally, the "Elite League") is the highest bandy league in the country for men, while Bandyallsvenskan is the second division. In Finland, the highest bandy league for men is the Bandyliiga. In a similar fashion, Russia, along with Sweden, has emerged as one of the two dominant women's bandy nations internationally, regularly placing first or second at the premier international bandy competition for women, the Women's Bandy World Championship.

After the victory in the 2016 World Championship, the fourth in a row, President Vladimir Putin received four players of the national team, Head Coach and Vice-President of the Russian Bandy Federation Sergey Myaus, the Russian Bandy Federation as well as Federation of International Bandy President Boris Skrynnik in The Kremlin. He talked, among other things, about the need to give more support to Russian bandy. It was the first time a head of state had accepted a meeting to talk about Russian bandy. Attending the meeting were also Minister of Sport, Tourism and Youth policy Vitaly Mutko and presidential adviser Igor Levitin. The month after, Igor Levitin held a follow-up meeting.

Following the Russian invasion of Ukraine in 2022, Russia is temporarily banned from taking part in international tournaments.

==== Russian Championship ====
The men's Russian professional bandy league is called the Russian Bandy Super League. The Russian Bandy Supreme League is the second tier of men's Russian bandy, below the Russian Bandy Super League.

The Russian Bandy Super League is the top tier of the Russian bandy league system. It is professional and played every year. The winner in the final becomes Russian champion. It is considered a continuation of the Soviet Union championship, which was played annually until the dissolution of the Soviet Union in 1991.

==== Russian Cup ====
The Russian Cup has been played annually most years since 1937, originally called the Soviet Cup.

=== Sweden ===
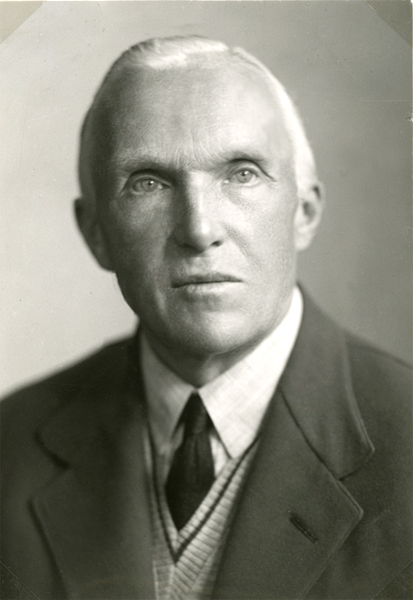
Clarence von Rosen introduced bandy to Sweden.

Bandy as an organized sport was introduced to Sweden in 1895. The Swedish royal family, noblemen and diplomats were among the first players. While the original inspiration mainly came from England, there also were early exchanges with Germany and Russia. Bandy was taken up as one of the sports at the international Nordic Games held in Sweden semi-annually from 1901. Swedish championships for men have been played annually since 1907 and Sweden was the first country to have an annual bandy league.

In the 1920s students played the game, then it spread across the country and became a largely middle-class sport. The games could attract huge crowds of spectators in those days. After Slottsbrons IF won the Swedish championship in 1934 it became popular amongst workers in many smaller industrial towns and villages. Where there was a bandy club the local factory corporation also usually sponsored the club to mutual benefit as a successful team led to good PR for the company. Bandy remains the main sport in many of these places.

In the mid-20th Century, bandy was the most popular spectator sport in Sweden, drawing huge crowds for most events and having bigger audiences than football or ice hockey. While not having the same numbers now, bandy is increasing the number of spectators in the 2020s, in contrast to many other sports.

Bandy in Sweden is famous for its "culture" where both playing bandy and being a spectator requires great fortitude and dedication. A bandyportfölj (Bandy Briefcase) is the classic accessory for spectating and is typically made of brown leather, well worn, and contains a warm drink in a thermos and/or a bottle of liquor. Bandy is most often played at outdoor arenas during winter time, so the need for spectators to carry flasks or thermoses of 'warming' liquid like glögg is a natural effect. With the sport moving indoors in recent decades and the arenas urging for non-alcoholic policies for the audiences, this tradition has partly changed, though not without opposition.

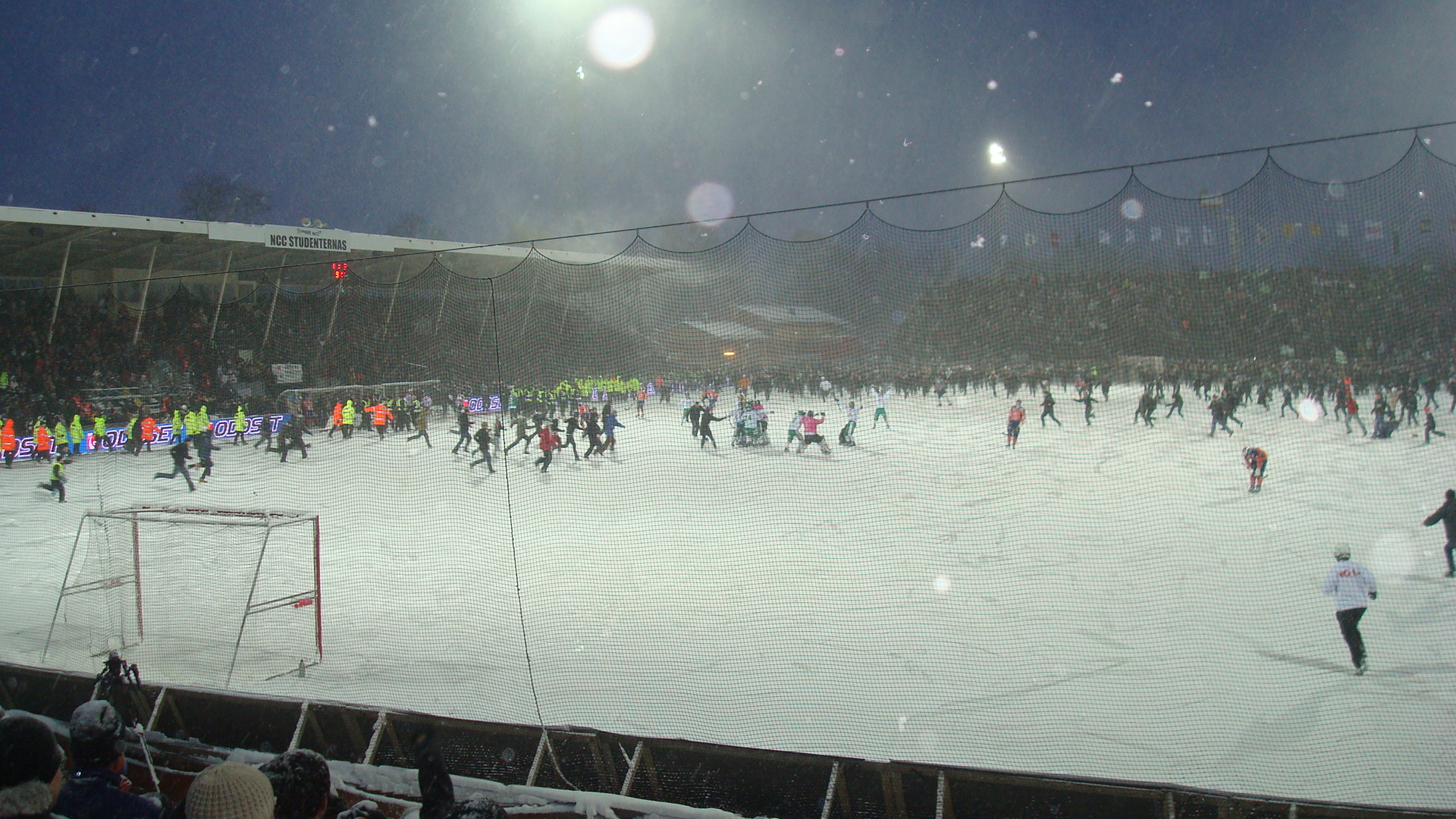
After the 2010 final at Studenternas Idrottsplats in Uppsala, Sweden

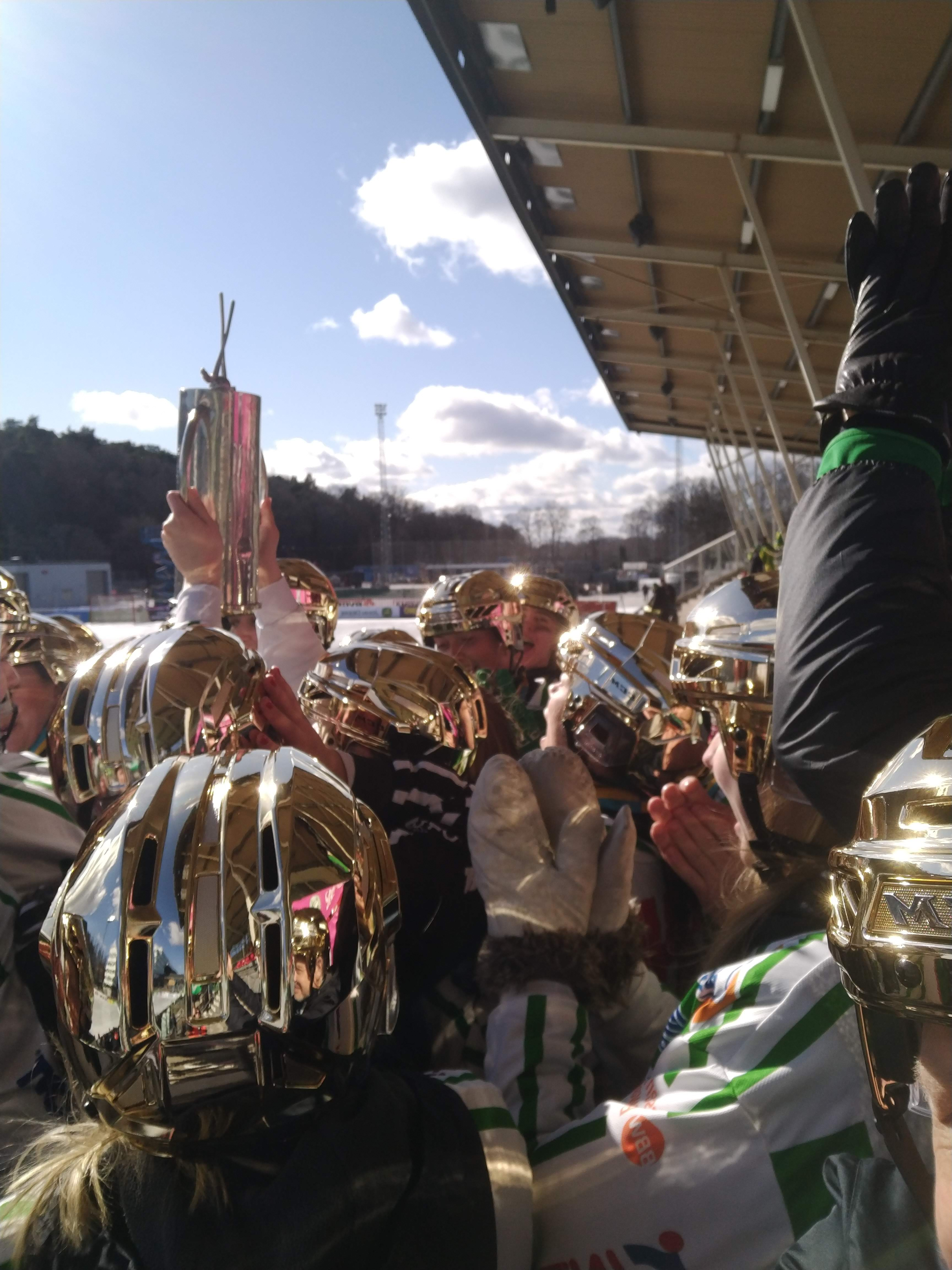
Västerås SK raises the Swedish Championship trophy for women after their victory against Skutskär in 2020.

A notable tradition is "annandagsbandy", bandy games played on Saint Stephen's Day (annandagen = ’the second day [of Christmas]’), which for many Swedes is an important Christmas season tradition and always draws bigger crowds than usual. Games traditionally begin at 1:15 pm.

==== Swedish Championship ====
In Sweden, the Elitserien (literally, the "Elite League") is the highest bandy league in the country for men, while Bandyallsvenskan is the second division. The Elite League is the top tier of Swedish bandy and is fully professional. At the end of the season, a play-off is made to make out the two teams playing the final match for the Swedish Championship. The Final is played every year on the third Saturday of March. From 1991 to 2012, it was played at Studenternas Idrottsplats in Uppsala, often drawing crowds in excess of 20,000. One reason the play-off match was set in Uppsala is because of IFK Uppsala's success at the beginning of the 20th century. IFK Uppsala won 11 titles in the Swedish Championships between 1907 and 1920, which made them the most successful bandy club in the entire country (now, however, the record is held by Västerås SK). A contributing factor was also the poor quality of the ice at Söderstadion, where the finals were held from 1967 to 1989.

In 2013 and 2014 the final was played indoors in Friends Arena, the national stadium for football in Solna, Stockholm, with a retractable roof and a capacity of 50,000. The first final at Friends Arena in 2013 drew a record crowd of 38,474 when Hammarby IF Bandy, after ending up in second place in six finals during the 2000s, won their second title. Due to declining attendance from 2015 through 2017 Tele2 Arena in southern Stockholm was chosen as a new venue. However, the new indoor venue failed to attract much more than half of the total capacity. In May 2017 it was announced that the finals will again be held at Studenternas IP in Uppsala from 2018 through at least 2021.

==== Svenska Cupen (The Swedish Cup) ====
The Svenska Cupen (English: The Swedish Cup), Svenska Cupen i bandy, takes place exclusively in Sweden. It is a single-elimination tournament competition in Swedish bandy and the second-most prominent bandy competition which is open only to domestic Swedish teams, after the national championship. Its inaugural year was 2005. The first women's competition was played in 2019.

=== Switzerland ===
In the late nineteenth and early 20th century, Switzerland had become a popular place for winter vacations and people went there from all over Europe. Winter sports like skiing, sledding and bandy was played in Geneva and other towns. Students from Oxford and Cambridge went to Switzerland to play each other – the predecessor of the recurring Ice Hockey Varsity Match was a bandy match played in St. Moritz in 1885. This popularity for Swiss venues of winter sport may have been a reason, the European Championship was held there in 1913.

Bandy has mainly been played as a recreational sport in Switzerland in the 2000s and 2010s. A Swiss men's national team was finally started up in 2017 and a Swiss women's national team made its international début in the 2018 Women's Bandy World Championship.

=== Ukraine ===
Bandy was played in Ukraine when it was part of the Soviet Union. After independence in 1991, it took some years before organized bandy formed again, but Ukrainian champions have been named annually since 2012.

=== United Kingdom ===
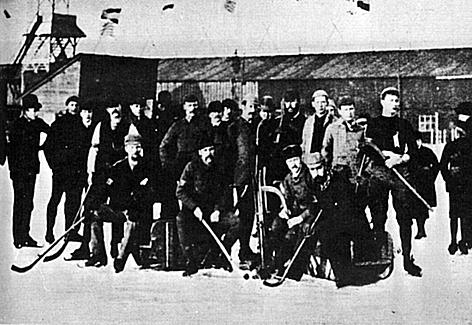
Members of the Bury Fen Bandy Club, an English bandy team in 1913

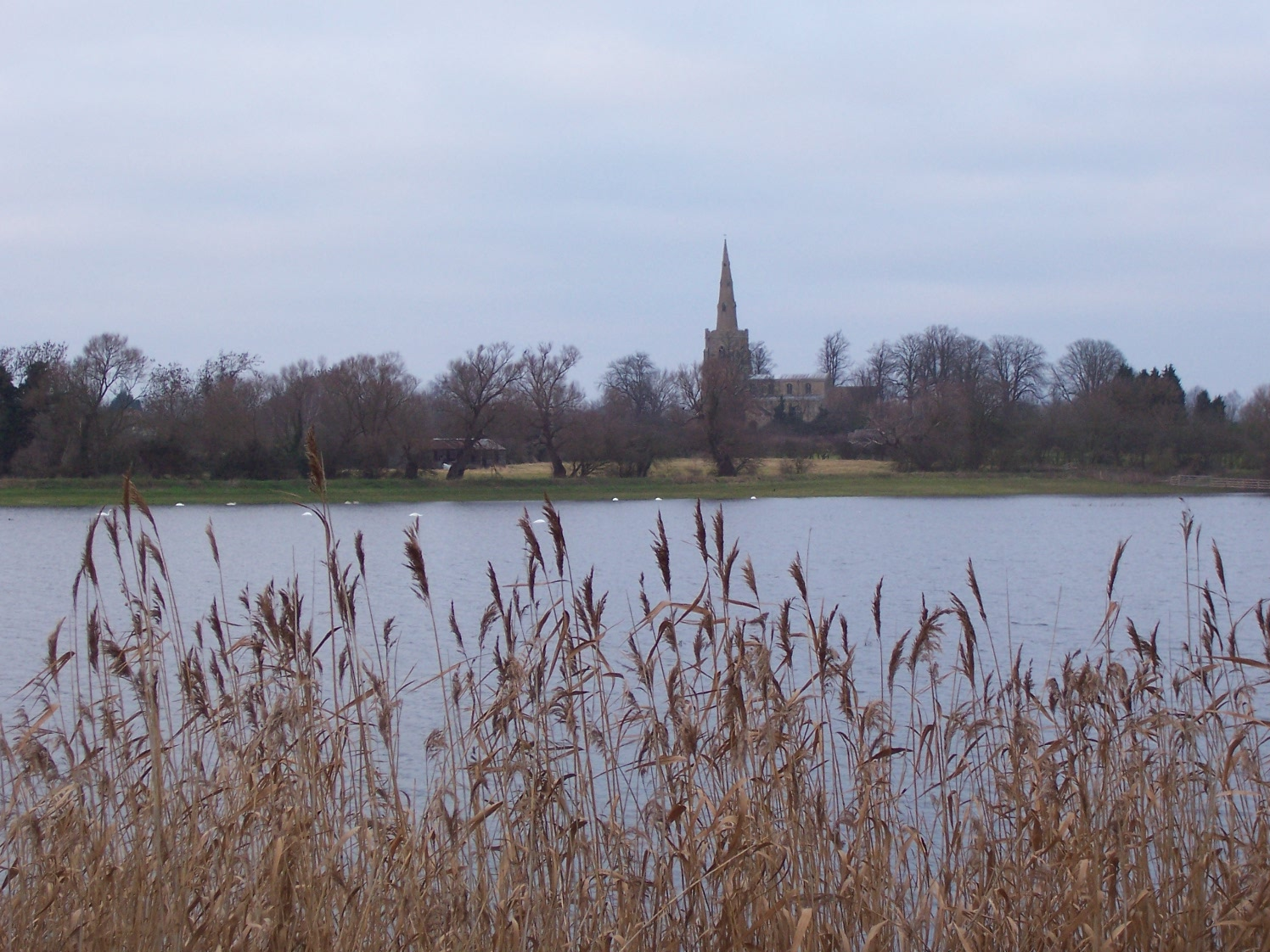
Bury Fen

The first recorded games of what may be considered bandy on ice took place in The Fens during the great frost of 1813–1814, although it is probable that the game had already been played there in the previous century. Bury Fen Bandy Club from Bluntisham-cum-Earith, near St Ives, was the most successful team, said to have remained unbeaten for a hundred years until the winter of 1890–1891. Charles Goodman Tebbutt of the Bury Fen Bandy Club was responsible for the first published rules of bandy in 1882, and also for introducing the game into the Netherlands and Sweden, as well as elsewhere in England where it became popular with cricket, rowing, and hockey clubs. Tebbutt's homemade bandy stick can be seen in the Norris Museum in St Ives.

The first Ice Hockey Varsity Matches between Oxford University and Cambridge University were played to bandy rules, even if it was called hockey on the ice at the time.

It is sometimes claimed that a national team for England won the European Bandy Championships in 1913, but that tournament likely never took place. While bandy is often thought to have been a popular sport in England in the decades around 1900, few records seem to have been kept.

A statue of a bandy player, designed by Peter Baker, was erected at the village pond of Earith to commemorate the 200th anniversary of the first documented game in 2013.

In March 2004, Norwegian ex-player Edgar Malman invited two big clubs to play a rink bandy exhibition game in Streatham, London. Russian Champions and World Cup Winner Vodnik met Swedish Champions Edsbyns IF in a match that ended 10–10. In 2010 England became a Federation of International Bandy member. The national federation is based in Cambridgeshire, the historical heartland.

The England Bandy Federation, was set up on 2 January 2017 at a meeting held in the historic old skaters public house, the Lamb and Flag in Welney in Norfolk, England, replacing the Bandy Federation of England which had been founded in 2010 but had had dwindling activity. In September 2017, the federation decided to widen its territory to all of the United Kingdom and changed its name to Great Britain Bandy Association. Great Britain entered a national team in the 2019 World Championships Group B in January and undefeated up to the final, won the silver medal in their final match against Estonia. They were set to return to the 2020 World Championships, but were refused visas to Russia. Since then they have not participated. However, the comeback will come in 2025.

In 2022, Great Britain premiered its national women's bandy team at the 2022 Women's Bandy World Championship.

=== United States ===
Bandy in its original, informal manner disappeared from the North American continent entirely once it and elements from the early game had become absorbed into a new sport of ice hockey. While ice hockey was growing and organizing in the United States, bandy was doing the same, but only in Europe and Scandinavia. It would not arrive in its organized format in the United States until the 1970s, almost a century after its initial development.

Bandy has been played in the United States since around the 1970s, after its promotion by Russians, Swedes and Finns in an exchange with softball, a sport which was promoted by Americans during the same time in the Soviet Union, Sweden and Finland. A key-person in the establishment of the sport in America was Bob Kojetin of Minnesota Softball. The sport is centered in Minnesota, with very few teams based elsewhere. The United States national bandy team has participated in the Bandy World Championships since 1985 and is also regularly playing friendly matches against Canada. The leading organization for bandy in the US is USA Bandy. The US has a men's national bandy team and a women's national bandy team.

The first bandy game in the US was played in December 1979 at the Lewis Park Bandy Rink in Edina, Minnesota. It was a friendly game between the Swedish junior national team and Swedish club team Brobergs IF.

United States bandy championships have been played annually since the early 1980s, but the sport is not widely covered by American sports media. The championship trophy is called the Gunnar Cup, named after Gunnar Fast, a Swedish army captain who helped introduce bandy to the United States around 1980.

==== Playing surfaces ====
While North American ice hockey rinks can be used for playing the bandy variant of rink bandy, places where the traditional game of bandy can be played require a larger sized playing surface, a bandy field, and are almost non-existent in North America. Minnesota is home to the only regulation sized bandy "rink" in North America, the Guidant John Rose Minnesota Oval, commonly referred to as, "The Oval", and is also the largest outdoor refrigerated skating rink in North America. The rink is 10,219 square meters with more than 800 tons of refrigeration and 135 km of pipes underneath the ice. The ice can be maintained in temperatures up to +10 degrees Celsius. The Oval can hold up to 300 spectators and has hosted World Cup Speedskating, the 2016 Women's Bandy World Championship, and Aggressive Skating/Biking competitions. The Oval is used mostly for inline hockey during the summer.

== National bandy federations ==
The following associations are the governing bodies for bandy in different countries and are member organizations of the Federation of International Bandy.

- Belarus – Беларуская федэрацыя хакея з мячaм (Belarusian Bandy Federation)
- Canada – Canada Bandy
- People's Republic of China – China Bandy Federation
- Colombia – Colombia Federation of Skating Sports
- Czech Republic – Czech Association of Bandy
- Estonia – Eesti Jääpalliliit (Estonian Bandy Association)
- Finland – Finland's Bandy Association
- Germany – German Bandy Federation
- Hungary – Hungarian Bandy Federation
- India – Bandy Federation of India
- Italy – Federazione Italiana Bandy
- Japan – Japan Bandy Federation
- Kazakhstan – Kazakhstan Bandy Federation
- Kyrgyzstan – Bandy Federation of Kyrgyzstan
- Latvia – Latvijas Bendija Federācija
- Mongolia – Bandy Federation of Mongolia
- Netherlands – Bandy Bond Nederland.
- Norway – Norges Bandyforbund
- Russia – Федерация хоккея с мячом России (Russian Bandy Federation)
- Somalia – Somali National Bandy Association
- Sweden – Svenska Bandyförbundet
- Switzerland – Federation of Swiss Bandy
- Ukraine – Українськa Федерація хокею з м'ячем та рінк-бенді (Ukrainian Bandy and Rink bandy Federation)
- United Kingdom – Great Britain Bandy Association
- United States – American Bandy Association

== See also ==
- Bandy World Championship
- Women's Bandy World Championship
- Rink bandy
- Bando
- Rinkball
- Pond hockey
- Ice hockey
- Ringette

== Bibliography ==
- The Earl of Suffolk and Berkshire Hedley Park and Aflalo, F.G. Bandy (includes definition and rules), pp. 71–72, 1897. Published by Lawrence & Bullen, Ltd., 16 Henrietta St., Covent Garden, London.
