= Kazakhstan Bandy Federation =

Sports governing body in Kazakhstan

Kazakhstan Bandy Federation (Qazaqstan Bendı Federatsııasy) is the governing body for the sport of bandy in Kazakhstan. It is based in Nur-Sultan. Its president is Oralbay Zhaksymbetov, while Vladimir Pashkovsky is Vice-President.

Bandy has been played for many decades in Kazakhstan when the country belonged to the Soviet Union. The Kazakh club Dynamo Alma-Ata became Soviet national champions in 1977 and in 1990. After the dissolution of the Soviet Union in 1991, the Kazakh federation was founded in 1993 and became a member of the Federation of International Bandy the same year. Kazakhstan Bandy Federation hosted the 2012 Bandy World Championship and received praise for the arrangement.

In September 2017 "ҚБФ" bought the country's only professional club, Akzhaiyk.

The Kazakhstan national bandy team has competed in the World Championships since 1995, winning the bronze medal six times as of 2015.

The federation will send a team to the men's tournament at the 2019 Winter Universiade.
