= Great Britain women's national bandy team =

National sports team

Great Britain
- Association: Great Britain Bandy Association (GBBA)
- Team colors

First international
- Great Britain 8–0 Switzerland (Åby, Sweden; 23 March 2022)

Biggest win
- Great Britain 12–1 Germany (Uppsala, Sweden; 19 March 2026)

Biggest defeat
- Great Britain 2–10 Netherlands (Uppsala, Sweden; 17 March 2026)

Women's Bandy World Championship
- Appearances: 2
- Best result: 6th (x2) (2nd in B div.) (2022)(2026)

The Great Britain women's national bandy team represents the United Kingdom in the sport of bandy. It is governed by the Great Britain Bandy Association.

The team made its international debut at the 2022 Women's Bandy World Championship, finishing in 6th place overall among eight teams.

The team did not enter the 2023 championship.

== Earlier attempt, for England ==
Coached by Hungarian former world championship player György Dragomir, a team representing England planned to participate at the 2014 Women's Bandy World Championship. but was eventually not scheduled to appear.

== Tournament participation ==
=== World Championships ===
- 2022 – 6th place (2nd in Division B)
- 2026 – 6th place (2nd in Division B)

== Team GB International Record ==
Updated as of the 2026 Women's Bandy World Championship

GB Overall Record 2022-2026
Country	Games Played	Wins	Losses	Win%	Goals For	Goals Against	Goal Difference	First Match	Last Match
Great Britain	9	6	3	66.66	47	23	24	21.1.2019	21.3.2026

International Record 2012-2026
Country	Games PLayed	Wins	Losses	Win%	Goals For	Goals Against	Goal Difference	First Match	Last Match
Netherlands	4	1	3	25	7	17	-10	25.3.2022	21.3.2026
Switzerland	3	3	0	100	23	3	20	22.3.2022	18.3.2026
Germany	1	1	0	100	12	1	11	19.3.2026	19.3.2026
Estonia	1	1	0	100	5	2	3	24.3.2022	24.3.2022

== Team GB Player Stats ==
Updated as of the 2026 Women's Bandy World Championship

Player Stats 2022-2026
Nat.	Name	Position	Games	Points	Goals	Assists	PIM	Gold	Silver	Bronze
(England) (Sweden)	Saga Hartley	-	9	31	26	5	12	-	2	-
(England) (Canada)	Ila Hobbins	-	9	12	9	3	0	-	2	-
(Wales) (Sweden)	Nandini Brolin	-	4	5	4	1	10	-	1	-
(United Kingdom)	Miranda Bache	-	5	3	3	0	0	-	1	-
(United Kingdom)	Matilda Revell	-	9	3	2	1	5	-	2	-
(United Kingdom)	Beth Milne	-	5	3	0	3	0	-	1	-
(Republic of Ireland)	Aisling Rafter	-	9	2	1	1	0	-	2	-
(England)	Laura Cope	-	4	1	1	0	0	-	1	-
(England)	Catherine Ruff	-	3	1	1	0	0	-	1	-
(England)	Judith Waller	-	9	1	0	1	0	-	2	-
(Scotland)	Victoria Carson	-	9	1	0	1	20	-	2	-
(United Kingdom)	Grace Ralphs	-	4	1	0	1	0	-	1	-
(United Kingdom)	Helen Clark	-	4	1	0	1	10	-	1	-
(Wales) (Sweden)	Emma Gordon	-	5	0	0	0	0	-	2	-
(England)	Same Payne	-	5	0	0	0	0	-	1	-
(England)	Clare Ledburg	-	5	0	0	0	0	-	1	-
(England)	Lucy Kirkman	-	5	0	0	0	0	-	1	-
(England)	Nina Brown	-	5	0	0	0	0	-	1	-
(United Kingdom) (United States)	Eva Harrison	-	5	0	0	0	0	-	2	-
(Wales)	Gemma Davies	GK	5	0	0	0	0	-	1	-
(England)	Abbie Thornton	-	5	0	0	0	0	-	2	-
(United Kingdom)	Eirys Hunter	GK	4	0	0	0	0	-	1	-
(England) (Sweden)	Cassandra Ward	-	3	0	0	0	30	-	1	-
(England)	Eleanor Shaw	-	3	0	0	0	10	-	1	-
(England)	Samantha Ruff	-	3	0	0	0	0	-	1	-
(Scotland)	Violet Mair	-	3	0	0	0	0	-	1	-

== Team GB Game History ==
Updated as of the 2022 Women's Bandy World Championship

GB Game History 2022-2026
Championships	Date	Opponent	Outcome	GF	GA	Game
Sweden, Womens B, Åby 2022	23.3.2022	Switzerland	W	8	0	-
Sweden, Womens B, Åby 2022	24.3.2022	Estonia	W	5	2	-
Sweden, Womens B, Åby 2022	25.3.2022	Netherlands	W	2	1	-
Sweden, Womens B, Åby 2022	26.3.2022	Switzerland	W	9	0	Semi Final
Sweden, Womens B, Åby 2022	27.3.2022	Netherlands	L	0	1	Gold Final
Sweden, Womens B, Uppsala 2026	17.3.2026	Netherlands	L	2	10	-
Sweden, Womens B, Uppsala 2026	18.3.26	Switzerland	W	6	3	-
Sweden, Womens B, Uppsala 2026	19.3.2026	Germany	W	12	1	-
Sweden, Womens B, Uppsala 2026	21.3.26	Netherlands	L	3	5	Gold Final

== The squad for the 2022 Women's Bandy World Championship ==
THE 2022 LINE-UP
Name	Number	Position
Sam Payne	2	-
Beth Milne	4	-
Emma Gordon	5	-
Abbie Thornton	7	-
Clare Lebburg	8	-
Lucy Kirkham	10	-
Nina Brown	16	-
Miranda Bache	18	-
Ila Hobbins	21	-
Aisling Rafter	22	-
Saga Hartley	33	-
Judith Waller	39	-
Victoria Carson	49	-
Eva Harrison	77	-
Matilda Revell	88	-
Gemma Davies	96	GK

== The squad for the 2026 Women's Bandy World Championship ==
THE 2026 LINE-UP
Name	Number	Position
Eirlys Hunter	1	GK
Samantha Ruff	3	-
Abbie Thornton	6, 23	-
Ila Hobbins	7	-
Cassandra Ward	9	-
Laura Cope	14, 43	-
Grace Ralphs	17	-
Nina Brodin	21	-
Aisling Rafter	22	-
Saga Hartley	33	-
Judith Waller	39	-
Victoria Carson	49	-
Helen Clark	62	-
Catherine Ruff	67	-
Eva Harrison	77	-
Violet Mair	84	-
Eleanor Shaw	86	-
Matilda Revell	88	-

== See also ==
- Bandy
- Rink bandy
- Women's Bandy World Championship
  - Sweden women's national bandy team
  - Russia women's national bandy team
  - Finland women's national bandy team
  - Norway women's national bandy team
  - Switzerland women's national bandy team
  - China women's national bandy team
  - Canada women's national bandy team
  - United States women's national bandy team
  - Hungary women's national bandy team
  - Soviet Union women's national bandy team
