= Federation of Swiss Bandy =

Federation of Swiss Bandy is the governing body for bandy and rink bandy in Switzerland. Its headquarters is in Lausanne. Federation of Swiss Bandy became a member of Federation of International Bandy in 2006.

The Federation of Swiss Bandy co-arranged the four nation tournament for the Coupe Norsel in Davos on 6 January 2014, which was a centenary celebration of the European Championship of 1913, which was held in the same town. The participating teams were Czech Republic, Hungary, Germany, and Netherlands. The women's national team made its debut in the 2018 Women's Bandy World Championship. The Swiss men's team made its debut in the 2019 Bandy World Championship.

== Link ==
- "Bienvenue sur le site de la Fédération Suisse de Bandy". swissbandy.ch. Archived from the original on 2013-12-05.
