= 2026 Bandy World Championship =

International bandy tournament in Finland

XLIV Bandy World Championship

Tournament details
- Host country: Finland
- Cities: Pori (Division A), Uppsala (Division B)
- Venue(s): Pori artificial ice rink (Division A); Serwent Indoor Arena (Division B)
- Dates: 12 – 18 January (Division A); 17 – 21 March (Division B)
- Teams: 6 (Division A) and 5 (Division B)

Final positions
- Champions: Sweden (15th title)
- Runners-up: Finland
- Third place: Norway
- Fourth place: United States

Tournament statistics
- Games played: 12
- Goals scored: 210 (17.5 per game)
- Attendance: 5,398 (450 per game)
- Scoring leader(s): Division A (Sweden) Christoffer Edlund (Division A 19 (24) points)

Official website
- https://www.bandywc2026.fi/

The 2026 Bandy World Championship was held in Finland from 12 to 18 January 2026. The tournament is the 42nd Bandy World Championship. The last time the championship was held in Finland was in 2001. The tournament is the seventh Bandy World Championship to be held in Finland.

The Federation of International Bandy awarded the games to Finland in June 2025. The visual identity of the games was released in August 2025.

== Venues ==
All matches were played at Pori artificial ice rink in Pori, Satakunta and Serwent Arena, Uppsala, Sweden.

Finland	Sweden
Pori	Uppsala
Venue; Pori artificial ice rink	Venue; Serwent Arena

== Qualified nations ==
=== Division A ===
- Finland
- Hungary
- Netherlands
- Norway
- Sweden
- United States

=== Division B ===
- Czech Republic
- Germany
- Great Britain
- Switzerland
- Ukraine

== Division A ==
=== Preliminary round ===
All times are local (UTC+2).

Pos	Team	Pld	W	D	L	GF	GA	GD	Pts	Qualification
1	Finland (H)	5	5	0	0	60	4	+56	10	Semifinals
2	Sweden	5	4	0	1	94	7	+87	8	Semifinals
3	Norway	5	3	0	2	48	22	+26	6	Semifinals
4	United States	5	2	0	3	23	49	−26	4	Semifinals
5	Netherlands	5	1	0	4	14	75	−61	2	Fifth place match
6	Hungary	5	0	0	5	3	85	−82	0	Fifth place match

Source: 2026 WCS MEN A – GAME SCHEDULE AND RESULTS
(H) Hosts
12 January 2026
13:00

Netherlands	0–21	Norway
	Report	Marius Andersen 1', 42', 55', 76'; Felix Callander 3', 14', 29', 51', 70', 73'; Fredrik Nordby 9', 11', 12', 46', 58'; Isac Jerner 33'; Fritiof Hagberg 38'; Jesper Tho 40'; Felix Ljungberg 72'; Tobias Mofjell 82'; Sondre Høydahl 89'

Pori artificial ice rink, Pori
Referee: (Sweden) Mats-Olof Gustafsson
12 January 2026
16:00

Sweden	34–0	Hungary
William Arvidsson 1', 6', 23', 39', 42', 61', 63', 76', 86'; Christoffer Edlund 4', 5', 32', 40', 46', 65', 77'; Martin Landström 11', 53', 54'; Pontus Vilén 14', 15', 60', 69', 72', 84'; Joel Broberg 16', 78'; Vladimir In-Fa-Lin 20', 28'; Sune Gustafsson 25'; Martin Karlsson 36', 82'; Alexander Härndahl 52'; Albin Airisniemi 71'	Report

Pori artificial ice rink, Pori
Referee: (Finland) Adam Jokinen
12 January 2026
19:00

Finland	14–1	United States
Emil Fedorov 2'; Ville Hämäläinen 8', 89'; Jaakko Hyvönen 10', 52'; Tero Liimatainen 22'; Tuukka Ässämäki 30', 44', 65'; Tatux Ässämäki 39'; Niklas Holopainen 47'; Teemu Määttä 48'; Samuli Helavuori 74'; Kalle Lempinen 78'	Report	Alexander Turtinen 36'

Pori artificial ice rink, Pori
Attendance: 756
Referee: (Norway) Fredrik Bjørseth Vigsnæs

13 January 2026
10:00

Sweden	28–0	Netherlands
William Arvidsson 2', 10', 36', 66'; Christoffer Edlund 9', 33', 41', 46', 54', 62', 65', 87'; Albin Airisniemi 15'; Joel Broberg 17', 35', 49'; Pontus Vilén 18', 21', 46', 63', 79'; Martin Karlsson 24', 59'; Martin Landström 30', 31', 82'; Vladimir In-Fa-Lin 32', 54'	Report

Pori artificial ice rink, Pori
Attendance: 63
Referee: (Norway) Fredrik Bjørseth Vigsnæs
13 January 2026
13:00

Finland	19–0	Hungary
Tuukka Ässämäki 3', 82', 83'; Teemu Määttä 14', 90'; Niklas Holopainen 25', 34' (p), 79'; Emil Fedorov 28', 57', 86' (p); Riku Hämäläinen 31', 46'; Tero Liimatainen 35', 77'; Jaakko Hyvönen 60', 73'; Kalle Lempinen 63'; Tatu Ässämäki 69'; Tero Liimatainen 77'	Report

Pori artificial ice rink, Pori
Attendance: 1,253
Referee: (Finland) Antti Malaska
13 January 2026
16:00

Norway	13–3	United States
Isac Jerner 12', 53'; Marius Andersen 30', 39'; Fredrik Nordby 32', 50'; Felix Callander 35', 43', 75'; Fritiof Hagberg 45+2'; Felix Ljungberg 57'; Stian Stærkeby 65'; Mathias Farnes 89'	Report	Michael Fabie 13'; Kyle Osterberg 23'; John Snodgrass 90'

Pori artificial ice rink, Pori
Attendance: 78
Referee: (Finland) Adam Jokinen

14 January 2026
08:00

Netherlands	0–16	Finland
	Report	Emil Fedorov 5', 26'; Tuukka Ässämäki 6', 49'; Riku Hämäläinen 15'; Topi Saukkonen 17'; Jaakko Hyvönen 19', 55'; Ville Hämäläinen 24', 75'; Niklas Holopainen 53', 63', 85'; Kalle Lempinen 60' (p), 71'; Teemu Määttä 74'

Pori artificial ice rink, Pori
Attendance: 887
Referee: (Norway) Fredrik Bjørseth Vigsnæs
14 January 2026
11:00

Norway	1–12	Sweden
Felix Callander 82'	Report	Martin Landström 1'; William Arvidsson 3'; Pontus Vilén 12'; Vladimir In-Fa-Lin 34', 76'; Christoffer Edlund 36', 85'; Alexander Härndahl 44'; Viktor Spångberg 60'; Joel Broberg 63', 89'; 69' (o.g.)

Pori artificial ice rink, Pori
Attendance: 152
Referee: Antti Malaska
14 January 2026
14:00

United States	10–0	Hungary
Lucas Philippenko 19'; Alexander Turtinen 27'; John Snodgrass 42', 86'; Michael Hosfield 45', 89'; Nolan Haney 57'; Porter Haney 63'; Kyle Osterberg 79'; Nicholas Cerrato 88'	Report

Pori artificial ice rink, Pori
Attendance: 124
Referee: (Sweden) Mats-Olof Gustafsson

15 January 2026
08:00

United States	2–17	Sweden
Nicholas Cerrato 33'; Nolan Haney 63'	Report	Pontus Vilén 3'; William Arvidsson 4', 14', 24', 46', 55'; Alexander Härndahl 6', 90+2'; Anton Dahlberg 10', 28'; Joel Broberg 16', 40'; Martin Landström 39', 44', 78'; Albin Airisniemi 53', 62'

Pori artificial ice rink, Pori
Attendance: 155
Referee: (Sweden) Mats-Olof Gustafsson
15 January 2026
14:00

Hungary	3–9	Netherlands
Dennis Pacsai 23'; Linus Schellin 29'; Andre Bergloenn 80'	Report	2' (o.g.); Sander Heinsbroek 16'; William Reuser 22', 45+1', 88'; Mikkel Hansen 45', 71'; Vincent Hole-Ruigrok 58', 76'

Pori artificial ice rink, Pori
Attendance: 118
Referee: (Finland) Antti Malaska
15 January 2026
20:00

Norway	0–7	Finland
	Report	Teemu Määttä 20'; Topi Saukkonen 24', 34'; Kalle Lempinen 25'; Emil Fedorov 39'; Tuukka Ässämäki 41'; Tero Liimatainen 75'

Pori artificial ice rink, Pori
Attendance: 1,813
Referee: (Finland) Adam Jokinen

16 January 2026
12:00

Netherlands	5–7	United States
Mikkel Hansen 2', 60'; William Reuser 13', 27'; Vincent Hole-Ruigrok 66'	Report	Kyle Osterberg 3'; John Snodgrass 20'; 23' (o.g.); Darian Romanko 26'; Alexander Turtinen 64', 84'; Michael Fabie 90+4'

Pori artificial ice rink, Pori
Referee: (Norway) Fredrik Bjørseth Vigsnæs
16 January 2026
15:00

Hungary	0–13	Norway
	Report	Marius Andersen 12', 25', 57', 70'; Mathias Farnes 15'; Fredrik Nordby 24', 27'; Fritiof Hagberg 48'; Sondre Høydahl 54'; Isac Jerner 79'; Felix Callander 80', 82', 88'

Pori artificial ice rink, Pori
Attendance: 532
Referee: (Finland) Adam Jokinen
16 January 2026
18:00

Finland	4–3	Sweden
Niklas Holopainen 12', 40'; 60' (o.g.); Emil Fedorov 86'	Report	William Arvidsson 2', 48'; Joel Broberg 4'

Pori artificial ice rink, Pori
Attendance: 3,000
Referee: (Sweden) Mats-Olof Gustafsson

=== Final round ===
==== Bracket ====
Semifinals
17 January
Finland	10
United States	1
17 January
Sweden	8
Norway	2

Final
18 January
Finland	1
Sweden	9
Third place
18 January
United States	3
Norway	8

==== Placement Game 5-6 ====
17 January 2026
7:30

Netherlands	3–1	Hungary
Remo Speijers 11'; Sander Heinsbroek 42'; Vincent Hole-Ruigrok 86'	Report	Peter Jankovics 87'

Pori artificial ice rink, Pori
Attendance: 102
Referee: Antti Malaska

==== Semifinals ====
17 January 2026
13:30

Sweden	8–2	Norway
Christoffer Edlund 4', 65'; Martin Landström 14'; Joel Broberg 19'; William Arvidsson 25', 41'; Pontus Vilén 31'; Sune Gustafsson 84'	Report	Felix Ljungberg 15'; Isac Jerner 39'

Pori artificial ice rink, Pori
Attendance: 414
Referee: Adam Jokinen
17 January 2026
19:15

Finland	10–1	United States
Teemu Määttä 5'; Jaakko Hyvönen 12', 70'; Samuli Helavuori 15'; Tero Liimatainen 17'; Niklas Holopainen 44'; Topi Saukkonen 55'; Emil Fedorov 56', 90'; Elias Gillgren 77'	Report	Cullen Munson 34'

Pori artificial ice rink, Pori
Attendance: 2,712
Referee: Fredrik Bjørseth Vigsnæs

==== Bronze Game ====
18 January 2026
11:00

United States	3–8	Norway
Alexander Turtinen 33'; Nolan Haney 73'; Michael Fabie 83'	Report	Isac Jerner 30', 44'; Fredrik Nordby 36', 90+2'; Felix Callander 41'; Felix Ljungberg 49' (p); Tobias Mofjell 66'; Tyler Myrmo 90+3'

Pori artificial ice rink, Pori
Attendance: 372
Referee: Fredrik Bjørseth Vigsnæs

==== Final ====
18 January 2026
17:30

Finland	1 – 9	Sweden
Niklas Holopainen 60' (p)	Report	Christoffer Edlund 2', 16' (p), 50', 84', 86'; Pontus Vilén 31', 56'; Alexander Härndahl 52'; Albin Airisniemi 58'

Pori artificial ice rink, Pori
Attendance: 3,000
Referee: (Sweden) Mats-Olof Gustafsson

=== Final ranking ===
Rank	Team
1st place, gold medalist(s)	Sweden
2nd place, silver medalist(s)	Finland
3rd place, bronze medalist(s)	Norway
4	United States
5	Netherlands
6	Hungary

=== Top Scorer ===
Scoring Leaders (Source: profixio):

- 24 Goals: (Sweden) Christoffer Edlund
- 23 Goals: (Sweden) William Arvidsson
- 16 Goals: (Sweden) Pontus Vilén
- 14 Goals: (Norway) Felix Callander
- 11 Goals: (Finland) Niklas Holopainen
- 11 Goals: (Norway) Fredrik Nordby
- 11 Goals: (Sweden) Martin Landström
- 11 Goals: (Sweden) Joel Broberg
- 10 Goals: (Norway) Marius Andersen
- 10 Goals: (Finland) Emil Fedorov
- 9 Goals: (Finland) Tuukka Ässämäki
- 8 Goals: (Finland) Jaakko Hyvönen
- 7 Goals: (Norway) Isac Jerner
- 6 Goals: (Sweden) Vladimir In-Fa-Lin
- 6 Goals: (Finland) Teemu Määttä
- 5 Goals: (Finland) Kalle Lempinen
- 5 Goals: (Netherlands) William Reuser
- 5 Goals: (Finland) Tero Liimatainen
- 5 Goals: (Sweden) Alexander Härndahl
- 5 Goals: (Sweden) Albin Airisniemi
- 4 Goals: (Sweden) Martin Karlsson
- 4 Goals: (Netherlands) Mikkel Hansen
- 4 Goals: (United States) John Snodgrass
- 4 Goals: (United States) Alexander Turtinen
- 4 Goals: (Finland) Ville Hämäläinen
- 4 Goals: (Norway) Felix Ljungberg
- 4 Goals: (Netherlands) Vincent Hole-Ruigrok
- 4 Goals: (Finland) Topi Saukkonen
- 3 Goals: (Finland) Riku Hämäläinen
- 3 Goals: (United States) Kyle Osterberg
- 3 Goals: (Norway) Fritiof Hagberg
- 3 Goals: (United States) Nolan Haney
- 3 Goals: (United States) Michael Fabie
- 2 Goals: (Finland) Tatux Ässämäki
- 2 Goals: (Sweden) Anton Dahlberg
- 2 Goals: (Norway) Sondre Høydahl
- 2 Goals: (United States) Michael Hosfield
- 2 Goals: (United States) Nicholas Cerrato
- 2 Goals: (Norway) Mathias Farnes
- 2 Goals: (Finland) Samuli Helavuori
- 2 Goals: (Sweden) Sune Gustafsson
- 2 Goals: (Netherlands) Sander Heinsbroek
- 2 Goals: (Norway) Tobias Mofjell
- 1 Goal: (United States) Lucas Philippenko
- 1 Goal: (Norway) Stian Stærkeby
- 1 Goal: (Hungary) Linus Schellin
- 1 Goal: (United States) Darian Romanko
- 1 Goal: (United States) Porter Haney
- 1 Goal: (Hungary) Dennis Pacsai
- 1 Goal: (Norway) Jesper Tho
- 1 Goal: (Hungary) Andre Bergloenn
- 1 Goal: (Sweden) Viktor Spångberg
- 1 Goal: (Netherlands) Remo Speijers
- 1 Goal: (Finland) Elias Gillgren
- 1 Goal: (Norway) Tyler Myrmo
- 1 Goal: (Hungary) Peter Jankovics
- 1 Goal: (United States) Cullen Munson
- 1 Goal: (United States) Alexander Turtinen

== Division B ==
=== Preliminary round ===
All times are local (UTC+1).

Pos	Team	Pld	W	D	L	GF	GA	GD	Pts	Qualification
1	Great Britain	4	4	0	0	17	11	+6	8	Final
2	Germany	4	3	0	1	17	9	+8	6	Final
3	Czech Republic	4	1	0	3	10	12	−2	2	Third place game
4	Ukraine	4	1	0	3	8	15	−7	2	Third place game
5	Switzerland	4	1	0	3	10	15	−5	2	

Updated to match(es) played on 21 March 2026. Source: FIB

The order of places among teams with the same number of points was determined by the goal difference in head-to-head matches (Czechia 5-4, Ukraine 6-6 and Switzerland 5-6).

17 March 2026
10:00

Switzerland	4-3 (2-1)	Ukraine
Nicolai Aulie 1'; William Sandstedt 24', 54'; Gian Luca Beeler 57'		self goal 11'; Matviy Khotyaintsev 56'; Arsenii Shevchuk 58'

Serwent Arena, Uppsala
17 March 2026
12:00

Czech Republic	2-4 (0-3)	Germany
Jiri Doskocil 47'; Rene Skala 53'		Johan Koch 19', 29'; Philip Billington 23'; Simon Främgårdh 21'

Serwent Arena, Uppsala
17 March 2026
20:00

Great Britain	4-3 (2-1)	Switzerland
Espen More-Mellem 7'; Jack Smith 23'; Steven Russel 44'; Jacob Signeul 63'		William Sandstedt 29'; Patrik Meyer 40', 47'

Serwent Arena, Uppsala

18 March 2026
12:00

Ukraine	0-5 (0-4)	Germany
		Simon Främgårdh 2', 24'; Elias Hjortenhed 6'; Jaromir Freiberger 32'; Frans Asp Von Schoultz 33'

Serwent Arena, Uppsala
18 March 2026
14:00

Czech Republic	3-4 (2-3)	Great Britain
Jakub Marik 22'; Jakub Sorse 26'; Miraslav Brokl 61'		Jonas Corcoran 9'; Thomas Kay 14', 25'; Martin Deacon 32'

Serwent Arena, Uppsala

19 March 2026
10:00

Switzerland	1-3 (0-2)	Czech Republic
Gian Luca Beler 33'		Peter Benes 2'; Jan Petr 21'; Jiri Doskocil 33'

Serwent Arena, Uppsala
19 March 2026
12:00

Germany	3-5 (1-3)	Great Britain
Johan Koch 9', 56'; Simon Främgårdh 57'		Thomas Kay 3'; Martin Deacon 4'; Jacob Signeul 19'; Ulf Carter 36'; Jack Smith 39'

Serwent Arena, Uppsala
19 March 2026
20:00

Ukraine	3-2 (1-1)	Czech Republic
Sergii Mozgovoi 14', 47'; Matviy Khotyaintsev 32'		Tomas Benak 7'; Rene Skala 43'

Serwent Arena, Uppsala

20 March 2026
15:00

Germany	5-2 (0-2)	Switzerland
Philip Billington 32', 52', 63'; Maximilian Fichter 33'; Justus Held 43'		Nikolai Aulie 7'; Arvid Vogstad 30'

Serwent Arena, Uppsala
20 March 2026
17:00

Great Britain	4-2 (2-0)	Ukraine
Jonas Corcoran 21'; Thomas Kay 30'; Steven Russel 49'; Ulf Carter 52'		Matviy Khotyaintsev 38'; Oleksandr Nechyporuk 60'

Serwent Arena, Uppsala

=== Final round ===
==== Third place game ====
21 March 2026
11:00

Czech Republic	4-3 (2-0)	Ukraine
Rene Skala 17', 31'; Pavel Banin 70', 73'		Oleksandr Badamshyn 54', 57'; Matviy Khotyaintsev 59'

Serwent Arena, Uppsala

==== Final ====
21 March 2026
17:00

Great Britain	12-2 (6-1)	Germany
Espen More-Mellem 1'; Stuart Jackson 7'; Martin Deacon 15', 92'; Steven Russel 26', 39'; Alex Ward 34'; Jacob Signeul 48'; Thomas Kay 63', 66', 72', 75'		Johan Koch 21'; Philip Billington 87'

Serwent Arena, Uppsala

=== Final ranking ===
Rank	Team
1st place, gold medalist(s)	Great Britain
2nd place, silver medalist(s)	Germany
3rd place, bronze medalist(s)	Czech Republic
4	Ukraine
5	Switzerland

=== Top Scorer ===
- 8 Goals: (United Kingdom) Thomas Kay
- 5 Goals: (Germany) Johan Koch
- 5 Goals: (Germany) Philip Billington
- 4 Goals: (Czech Republic) Rene Skala
- 4 Goals: (Germany) Simon Främgårdh
- 4 Goals: (United Kingdom) Martin Deacon
- 4 Goals: (United Kingdom) Steven Russel
- 4 Goals: (Ukraine) Matviy Khotyaintsev
- 3 Goals: (United Kingdom) Jacob Signeul
- 3 Goals: (Switzerland) William Sandstedt
- 2 Goals: (Czech Republic) Jiri Doskocil
- 2 Goals: (Czech Republic) Pavel Banin
- 2 Goals: (United Kingdom) Jack Smith
- 2 Goals: (United Kingdom) Jonas Corcoran
- 2 Goals: (United Kingdom) Ulf Carter
- 2 Goals: (United Kingdom) Espen More-Mellem
- 2 Goals: (Switzerland) Patrik Meyer
- 2 Goals: (Switzerland) Gian Luca Beeler
- 2 Goals: (Switzerland) Nicolai Aulie
- 2 Goals: (Ukraine) Sergii Mozgovoi
- 2 Goals: (Ukraine) Oleksandr Badamshyn
- 1 Goal: (Czech Republic) Jakub Marik
- 1 Goal: (Czech Republic) Jakub Sorse
- 1 Goal: (Czech Republic) Miraslav Brokl
- 1 Goal: (Czech Republic) Peter Benes
- 1 Goal: (Czech Republic) Jan Petr
- 1 Goal: (Czech Republic) Tomas Benak
- 1 Goal: (Germany) Elias Hjortenhed
- 1 Goal: (Germany) Jaromir Freiberger
- 1 Goal: (Germany) Frans Asp Von Schoultz
- 1 Goal: (Germany) Maximilian Fichter
- 1 Goal: (Germany) Justus Held
- 1 Goal: (United Kingdom) Stuart Jackson
- 1 Goal: (United Kingdom) Alex Ward
- 1 Goal: (Switzerland) Arvid Vogstad
- 1 Goal: (Ukraine) Arsenii Shevchuk
- 1 Goal: (Ukraine) Oleksandr Nechyporuk
- 1 Self Goal: (Switzerland) for (Ukraine)

== Broadcasting rights ==
Country/region	Broadcaster
Finland	Yle, Satakunnan Kansa
Russia	Start
Sweden	Aftonbladet
Worldwide	FIB TV

Souruce:
