= 2020 Bandy World Championship =

XLth Bandy World Championship

Tournament details
- City: Irkutsk
- Venues: 5 (in 2 host cities)
- Dates: Division A: Cancelled; Division B: 1–6 March 2020
- Teams: Division A: 8; Division B: 10

The 2020 Bandy World Championship was to be an international sports tournament between men's national teams among bandy playing nations. It was to be the fortieth Bandy World Championship. While the Division B tournament was held from 1 to 6 March 2020, the Division A tournament was postponed a number of times and finally cancelled on 1 March 2022.

The Division A tournament was supposed to be held from 29 March to 5 April 2020 but was postponed due to the COVID-19 pandemic. The Division A tournament was cancelled on 15 September 2020. The FIB later announced that the 2020 Division A tournament in Irkutsk would be finalised in October 2021, and the subsequent World Championship in Syktyvkar would be played in 2022. On 24 August 2021, Sweden announced its withdrawals from the competition, due to the continued threat of COVID-19. Finland and Norway had already made the same decisions earlier. Subsequently, on 30 August 2021, the FIB decided to postpone the championships once again, now to March - April 2022, which would be the 2022 Bandy World Championship.

== Host selection ==
The 2019 tournament was originally supposed to be held in Irkutsk in Russia, but the decision was reconsidered due to a failure to meet the demands on an arena accepted for international play and the tournament was held in Vänersborg in Sweden instead.

For 2020, the new Arena Baikal will be ready for play, and therefore, this year's world championship will be held in Irkutsk. Some games will probably be played in surrounding cities too.

The last time the World Championship was held in Irkutsk, was in 2014.

== Venues ==
- Syktyvkar – Ice Palace Arena

== Qualified nations ==
Based on the nations taking part in the last world championship tournament and the qualification made there, the following nations were foreseen to participate.

=== Division A ===
==== Pool A ====
- Finland
- Kazakhstan
- Russia
- Sweden

==== Pool B ====
- Estonia
- Germany
- Norway
- United States

=== Division B ===
- ~~China~~
- Czech Republic
- ~~Great Britain~~
- Hungary
- Japan
- Latvia
- Mongolia
- Netherlands
- Slovakia
- Somalia
- Switzerland
- Ukraine

== Division A ==
=== Preliminary round ===
==== Group A ====
Pos	Team	Pld	W	D	L	GF	GA	GD	Pts	Qualification
1	Russia (H)	0	0	0	0	0	0	0	0	Semifinals
2	Sweden	0	0	0	0	0	0	0	0	Semifinals
3	Finland	0	0	0	0	0	0	0	0	Quarterfinals
4	Kazakhstan	0	0	0	0	0	0	0	0	Quarterfinals

First match(es) will be played: unknown. Source:
(H) Hosts

==== Group B ====
Pos	Team	Pld	W	D	L	GF	GA	GD	Pts	Qualification
1	Norway	0	0	0	0	0	0	0	0	Quarterfinals
2	United States	0	0	0	0	0	0	0	0	Quarterfinals
3	Germany	0	0	0	0	0	0	0	0	7th place game
4	Estonia	0	0	0	0	0	0	0	0	7th place game

First match(es) will be played: unknown. Source:

=== Knockout stage ===
==== Bracket ====
Quarterfinals
A4
B1
A3
B2

Semifinals
A1
A2

Final
Third place

Seventh place

Fifth place

==== Quarterfinals ====
A4	Cancelled	B1

Syktyvkar

A3	Cancelled	B2

Syktyvkar

==== Seventh place game ====
B3	Cancelled	B4

Syktyvkar

==== Fifth place game ====
Cancelled

Syktyvkar

==== Semifinals ====
Cancelled

Syktyvkar

Cancelled

Syktyvkar

==== Third place game ====
Cancelled

Syktyvkar

==== Final ====
Cancelled

Syktyvkar

== Division B ==
2020–21 Bandy World Championship Division B
Tournament details
- Host country: Russia
- Venues: 4 (in 2 host cities)
- Dates: 1–6 March 2020
- Teams: 10

Final positions
- Champions: Hungary
- Runners-up: Ukraine
- Third place: Slovakia
- Fourth place: Mongolia

Tournament statistics
- Games played: 34
- Goals scored: 176 (5.18 per game)
- Attendance: 8,988 (264 per game)
- Scoring leader(s): (Hungary) Linus Schellin (10 goals)

=== Preliminary round ===
==== Group A ====
Pos	Team	Pld	W	D	L	GF	GA	GD	Pts	Qualification
1	Hungary	4	4	0	0	17	3	+14	8	Quarterfinals
2	Ukraine	4	2	1	1	8	5	+3	5	Quarterfinals
3	Netherlands	4	1	2	1	12	7	+5	4	Quarterfinals
4	Czech Republic	4	1	1	2	7	10	−3	3	Quarterfinals
5	Switzerland	4	0	0	4	2	21	−19	0	9th place game

Source: FIB
1 March 2020
08:30

Czech Republic	0–2	Ukraine
	Report

Zenit Stadium, Irkutsk
Attendance: 250
Referee: (Russia) Rodion Yarovenko
1 March 2020
09:00

Netherlands	2–3	Hungary
	Report

Trud Stadium, Irkutsk
Attendance: 150
Referee: (Sweden) Andreas Rönnbäck
1 March 2020
15:00

Netherlands	2–2	Czech Republic
	Report
Penalties
	4–3

Rekord Stadium, Irkutsk
Attendance: 215
Referee: (Canada) Brenden Burnell
1 March 2020
15:00

Hungary	7–0	Switzerland
	Report

Trud Stadium, Irkutsk
Attendance: 700
Referee: (Czech Republic) Radek Kopal

2 March 2020
09:00

Netherlands	2–2	Ukraine
	Report
Penalties
	2–4

Trud Stadium, Irkutsk
Attendance: 100
Referee: (Kazakhstan) Andrey Piunov
2 March 2020
10:00

Czech Republic	4–1	Switzerland
	Report

Zenit Stadium, Irkutsk
Attendance: 150
Referee: (Russia) Rodion Yarovenko
2 March 2020
15:00

Hungary	5–1	Czech Republic
	Report

Trud Stadium, Irkutsk
Attendance: 250
Referee: (Canada) Brendan Burnell
2 March 2020
16:00

Ukraine	4–1	Switzerland
	Report

Rekord Stadium, Irkutsk
Attendance: 298
Referee: (Kazakhstan) Andrey Piunov

3 March 2020
11:00

Hungary	2–0	Ukraine
	Report

Stroitel Stadium, Shelekhov
Attendance: 154
Referee: (Sweden) Andreas Rönnbäck
3 March 2020
11:00

Netherlands	6–0	Switzerland
	Report

Rekord Stadium, Irkutsk
Attendance: 146
Referee: (Canada) Brenden Burnell

==== Group B ====
Pos	Team	Pld	W	D	L	GF	GA	GD	Pts	Qualification
1	Mongolia	4	4	0	0	18	1	+17	8	Quarterfinals
2	Slovakia	4	3	0	1	14	4	+10	6	Quarterfinals
3	Latvia	4	2	0	2	13	7	+6	4	Quarterfinals
4	Japan	4	1	0	3	11	6	+5	2	Quarterfinals
5	Somalia	4	0	0	4	0	38	−38	0	9th place game

Source: FIB
1 March 2020
10:00

Latvia	0–4	Slovakia
	Report

Rekord Stadium, Irkutsk
Attendance: 240
Referee: (Czech Republic) Radek Kopal
1 March 2020
11:30

Mongolia	10–0	Somalia
	Report

Stroitel Stadium, Shelekhov
Attendance: 380
Referee: (Kazakhstan) Andrey Piunov
1 March 2020
17:30

Japan	9–0	Somalia
	Report

Trud Stadium, Irkutsk
Attendance: 650
Referee: (Russia) Rodion Yarovenko
1 March 2020
19:30

Slovakia	0–4	Mongolia
	Report

Trud Stadium, Irkutsk
Attendance: 250
Referee: (Canada) Brenden Burnell

2 March 2020
09:00

Latvia	11–0	Somalia
	Report

Rekord Stadium, Irkutsk
Attendance: 32
Referee: (Sweden) Andreas Rönnbäck
2 March 2020
10:00

Japan	1–2	Mongolia
	Report

Stroitel Stadium, Shelekhov
Attendance: 154
Referee: (Czech Republic) Radek Kopal
2 March 2020
16:00

Slovakia	8–0	Somalia
	Report

Stroitel Stadium, Shelekhov
Attendance: 184
Referee: (Russia) Rodion Yarovenko
2 March 2020
18:00

Japan	1–2	Latvia
	Report

Rekord Stadium, Irkutsk
Attendance: 168
Referee: (Sweden) Andreas Rönnbäck

3 March 2020
11:00

Japan	0–2	Slovakia
	Report

Zenit Stadium, Irkutsk
Attendance: 160
Referee: (Czech Republic) Radek Kopal
3 March 2020
14:00

Latvia	0–2	Mongolia
	Report

Rekord Stadium, Irkutsk
Attendance: 180
Referee: (Kazakhstan) Andrey Piunov

=== Knockout stage ===
==== Bracket ====
Quarterfinals
4 March
Hungary	4
Japan	1
4 March
Netherlands	2
Slovakia	3
4 March
Czech Republic	1
Mongolia	2
4 March
Ukraine	5
Latvia	1

Semifinals
5 March
Hungary	5
Slovakia	0
5 March
Mongolia	1
Ukraine	3

Final
6 March
Hungary	4
Ukraine	1
Third place
6 March
Slovakia	3
Mongolia	2

5–8th place semifinals
5 March
Japan	2 (1)
Netherlands (pen.)	2 (3)
5 March
Czech Republic	1
Latvia	3

Fifth place
6 March
Netherlands (OT)	5
Latvia	4
Seventh place
6 March
Japan	3
Czech Republic	1

==== Quarterfinals ====
4 March 2020
10:00

Hungary	4–1	Japan
	Report

Trud Stadium, Irkutsk
Attendance: 200
Referee: (Czech Republic) Radek Kopal
4 March 2020
10:00

Czech Republic	1–2	Mongolia
	Report

Rekord Stadium, Irkutsk
Attendance: 102
Referee: (Canada) Brenden Burnell
4 March 2020
12:00

Netherlands	2–3	Slovakia
	Report

Trud Stadium, Irkutsk
Attendance: 150
Referee: (Sweden) Andreas Rönnbäck
4 March 2020
12:00

Ukraine	5–1	Latvia
	Report

Rekord Stadium, Irkutsk
Attendance: 34
Referee: (Russia) Rodion Yarovenko

==== 5–8th place semifinals ====
5 March 2020
09:00

Japan	2–2 (a.e.t.)	Netherlands
	Report
Penalties
	1–3

Rekord Stadium, Irkutsk
Attendance: 125
Referee: (Russia) Rodion Yarovenko
5 March 2020
11:40

Czech Republic	1–3	Latvia
	Report

Rekord Stadium, Irkutsk
Attendance: 97
Referee: (Kazakhstan) Andrey Piunov

==== Semifinals ====
5 March 2020
12:00

Hungary	5–0	Slovakia
	Report

Trud Stadium, Irkutsk
Attendance: 32
Referee: (Canada) Brenden Burnell
5 March 2020
14:30

Mongolia	1–3	Ukraine
	Report

Trud Stadium, Irkutsk
Attendance: 367
Referee: (Czech Republic) Radek Kopal

==== Ninth place game ====
5 March 2020
13:40

Somalia	0–10	Switzerland
	Report

Rekord Stadium, Irkutsk
Attendance: 102
Referee: (Sweden) Andreas Rönnbäck

6 March 2020
10:00

Switzerland	4–1	Somalia
	Report

Stroitel Stadium, Shelekhov
Attendance: 142
Referee: (Kazakhstan) Andrey Piunov

Switzerland won 14–1 on aggregate.

==== Seventh place game ====
6 March 2020
09:00

Japan	3–1	Czech Republic
	Report

Rekord Stadium, Irkutsk
Attendance: 102
Referee: (Canada) Brenden Burnell

==== Fifth place game ====
6 March 2020
11:00

Netherlands	5–4 (OT)	Latvia
	Report

Rekord Stadium, Irkutsk
Attendance: 114
Referee: (Czech Republic) Radek Kopal

==== Third place game ====
6 March 2020
12:00

Slovakia	3–2	Mongolia
	Report

Trud Stadium, Irkutsk
Attendance: 256
Referee: (Russia) Rodion Yarovenko

==== Final ====
6 March 2020
15:00

Hungary	4–1	Ukraine
	Report

Trud Stadium, Irkutsk
Attendance: 2,354
Referee: (Sweden) Andreas Rönnbäck

=== Final ranking ===
Rank	Team
1	Hungary ▲
2	Ukraine
3	Slovakia
4	Mongolia
5	Netherlands
6	Latvia
7	Japan
8	Czech Republic
9	Switzerland
10	Somalia
