= Great Britain national bandy team =

Great Britain
- Association: Great Britain Bandy Association (GBBA)
- Team colors

First international
- Great Britain 5–0 Latvia (Vänersborg, Sweden; 21 January 2019)

Biggest win
- Great Britain 13–1 Switzerland (Uppsala, Sweden; 14 March 2025)

Biggest defeat
- Great Britain 2–9 Netherlands (Uppsala, Sweden; 13 March 2025)

Bandy World Championship
- Appearances: 3
- Best result: 7th (1st in B div.) (2026)

The Great Britain national bandy team represents the United Kingdom in international bandy for men since 2019. There used to be a team England in international bandy in the late 19th and early 20th centuries, but when Britain eventually came back to the sport, it was decided to do it under the name Great Britain.

== Early days: 1890s to 1910s ==
An England national bandy team was formed in the years around 1900. It was a natural consequence of England being the birthplace of bandy in the 19th century, bandy often being seen as the winter equivalent to either association football or field hockey. Early international games were played against the Netherlands, Germany and France. At the time, bandy in England was administered through the National Bandy Association.

The societal upheavals due to World War I then ended the interest for bandy in Britain.

== Present time: 2010s and 2020s ==
After almost a hundred years, a new national federation for bandy was formed. The Bandy Federation of England joined the Federation of International Bandy in 2010 and England aimed to play in the World Championships in the coming years. Debuting in 2018 was the goal.

The federation changed names to England Bandy Federation in January 2017 and to Great Britain Bandy Association in September 2017. The Great Britain national bandy team made its debut at the 2019 Bandy World Championship in Sweden and managed to become runners-up in the B Division in its début championship tournament, but could not attend the 2020 World Championship in Russia due to problems getting visas for the players. The early 2020s has since seen a hiatus in international play due to the COVID-19 pandemic and the Russian invasion of Ukraine. However, in 2025 the men's team returned to play in the Bandy World Cup, achieving third place in Division B.

== Tournament participation ==
=== World Championships ===
- 2019 – 10th place (2nd in Division B)
- 2025 – 8th place (3rd in Division B)
- 2026 – 7th place (1st in Division B)

== Team GB International Record ==
Updated as of the 2026 World Championship

GB Overall Record 2019-2026
Country	Games Played	Wins	Losses	Win%	Goals For	Goals Against	Goal Difference	First Match	Last Match
Great Britain	17	14	3	82.35	107	44	63	21.1.2019	21.3.2026

International Record 2019-2026
Country	Games Played	Wins	Losses	Win%	Goals For	Goals Against	Goal Difference	First Match	Last Match
Switzerland	3	3	0	100	26	4	22	10.3.2025	17.3.2026
Germany	3	2	1	66.6	20	9	11	12.3.2025	21.3.2026
Slovakia	2	2	0	100	10	3	7	23.1.2019	11.3.2025
Somalia	1	1	0	100	14	0	14	22.1.2019	22.1.2019
China	1	1	0	100	11	0	11	22.1.2019	22.1.2019
Latvia	1	1	0	100	5	0	5	21.1.2019	21.1.2019
Ukraine	1	1	0	100	4	2	2	20.3.2026	20.3.2026
Japan	1	1	0	100	3	1	2	24.1.2019	24.1.2019
Hungary	1	1	0	100	5	4	1	24.1.2019	24.1.2019
Czech Republic	1	1	0	100	4	3	1	18.3.2026	18.3.2026
Estonia	1	0	1	0	3	9	-6	25.1.2019	25.1.2019
Netherlands	1	0	1	0	2	9	-7	13.3.2025	13.3.2025

== Team GB Player Stats ==
Updated as of the 2026 World Championship

Player Stats 2019-2026
Nat.	Name	Position	Games	Points	Goals	Assists	PIM	Gold	Silver	Bronze
(Republic of Ireland) (Sweden)	Cormac Åhlström Horgan	-	17	30	6	24	15	1	1	1
(United Kingdom) (Sweden)	Martin Deacon	-	11	21	12	9	32	1	1	-
(England) (Sweden)	Alex Ward	-	17	16	9	7	6	1	1	1
(England) (Norway)	Steven Russell	-	10	15	9	6	0	1	-	1
(United Kingdom) (Norway)	Oscar Gillingham-Aukner	-	7	13	11	2	6	-	1	-
(England) (Sweden)	Jack Evitt-Smith	-	10	11	9	2	12	1	-	1
(England) (Sweden)	Jacob Signeul	-	17	11	8	3	36	1	1	1
(England) (Norway)	Thomas Kay	-	5	8	8	0	10	1	-	-
(United Kingdom) (Norway)	Espen Moore-Mallen	-	8	8	6	2	0	1	-	1
(England) (Sweden)	Alexander Smith	Defender	11	7	4	3	34	-	1	1
(England) (Sweden)	Ulf Carter	-	9	5	4	1	16	1	-	1
(United Kingdom)	Joe Edwards	-	6	5	2	3	6	-	1	-
(United Kingdom)	Michael Willock	-	7	4	3	1	6	-	1	-
(England) (Sweden)	Oliver Corcan	-	12	4	2	2	16	1	1	-
(England)	Stuart Jackson	-	8	3	2	1	12	1	-	1
(United Kingdom) (Norway)	Travis Brannan	-	5	3	2	1	6	-	-	1
(England) (Sweden)	Jonas Corcoran	-	5	3	2	1	0	1	-	-
(England) (Sweden)	Robin Signeul	-	17	3	1	2	12	1	1	1
(United Kingdom)	Nathan Gilbert	-	7	2	2	0	0	-	1	-
(United Kingdom)	Lewis Enfield	-	7	2	1	1	0	-	1	-
(England) (Switzerland)	Jack Wright	-	5	2	1	1	0	-	-	1
(England) (Norway)	Jakob Møller Haggerty	-	7	2	1	1	0	1	-	1
(United Kingdom) (Sweden)	Colin Jack	Defender	15	1	1	0	30	1	1	1
(England)	Thomas Parker	-	7	1	1	0	0	-	1	-
(United Kingdom) (Norway)	Mathias Curle-Halvorsen	-	5	1	0	1	0	-	-	1
(England) (Norway)	Nicholas Evans	GK	9	1	0	1	0	1	-	1
(Scotland) (Sweden)	Erik Gordon	GK	10	0	0	0	0	1	-	1
(United Kingdom) (Norway)	Christopher Hall	GK	7	0	0	0	0	-	1	-
(United Kingdom)	Timothy Smith	GK	7	0	0	0	0	-	1	-
(England)	Charlie Hargrove	-	2	0	0	0	0	-	-	1
(England)	Jack Haynes	-	2	0	0	0	0	1	-	-

== Team GB Game History ==
Updated as of the 2026 World Championship

GB Game History 2019-2026
Championships	Date	Opponent	Outcome	GF	GA	Game
Sweden, Mens B, Vänersborg 2019	21.1.2019	Latvia	W	5	0	-
Sweden, Mens B, Vänersborg 2019	22.1.2019	China	W	11	0	-
Sweden, Mens B, Vänersborg 2019	22.1.2019	Somalia	W	14	0	-
Sweden, Mens B, Vänersborg 2019	23.1.2019	Slovakia	W	6	1	-
Sweden, Mens B, Vänersborg 2019	24.1.2019	Japan	W	3	1	-
Sweden, Mens B, Vänersborg 2019	24.1.2019	Hungary	W	5	4	Semi-Finals
Sweden, Mens B, Vänersborg 2019	25.1.2019	Estonia	L	3	9	Gold Final
Sweden, Mens B, Uppsala 2025	10.3.2025	Switzerland	W	9	0	-
Sweden, Mens B, Uppsala 2025	11.3.2025	Slovakia	W	4	2	-
Sweden, Mens B, Uppsala 2025	12.3.2025	Germany	L	3	4	-
Sweden, Mens B, Uppsala 2025	13.3.2025	Netherlands	L	2	9	-
Sweden, Mens B, Uppsala 2025	14.3.2025	Switzerland	W	13	1	Bronze Final
Sweden, Mens B, Uppsala 2026	17.3.2026	Switzerland	W	4	3	-
Sweden, Mens B, Uppsala 2026	18.3.2026	Czech Republic	W	4	3	-
Sweden, Mens B, Uppsala 2026	19.3.2026	Germany	W	5	3	-
Sweden, Mens B, Uppsala 2026	20.3.2026	Ukraine	W	4	2	-
Sweden, Mens B, Uppsala 2026	21.3.2026	Germany	W	12	2	Gold Final

== The squad for the 2019 Bandy World Championship ==
THE 2019 LINE-UP
Name	Number	Position
Collin Jack	5	Defender
Alexander Smith	6	Defender
Thomas Parker	8	-
Nathan Gilbert	9	-
Martin Deacon	10	-
Jacob Signeul	15	-
Oscar Gillingham-Aukner	18	-
Robin Signeul	22	-
Christopher Hall	29	GK
Timothy Smith	35	GK
Alex Ward	42	-
Oliver Corcoran	57	-
Joe Edwards	64	-
Michael Willock	65	-
Cormac Åhlström Horgan	77	-
Lewis Enfield	98	-
Anders Gidrup	-	Manager
Hans Åström	-	Coach
Patrik Larsson		Coach

== The squad for the 2025 Bandy World Championship ==
THE 2025 LINE-UP
Name	Number	Position
Cormac Åhlström Horgan	2	-
Collin Jack	3	Defender
Charlie Hargrove	4	-
Jack Wright	5	-
Stuart Jackson	6	-
Robin Signeul	7	-
Alex Ward	8	-
Jack Evitt-Smith	9	-
Jakob Møller Haggerty	10	-
Ulf Carter	11	-
Jacob Signeul	12	-
Espen Moore-Mellem	13	-
Steven Russell	14	-
Mathias Curle-Halvorsen	15	-
Travis Brannan	16	-
Alexander Smith	17	Defender
Nicholas Evans	29	GK
Erik Gordon	35	GK
Petter Halvorsen	-	Manager
Anders Gidrup	-	Coach
Jonas Bengtsson	-	Coach

== The squad for the 2026 Bandy World Championship ==
THE 2026 LINE-UP
Name	Number	Position
Nicholas Evans	1	GK
Collin Jack	5	Defender
Thomas Kay	8	-
Steven Russel	10	-
Jakob Haggetry	11	-
Jonas Corcoran	13	-
Jacob Signeul	15	-
Robin Signeul	17	-
Martin Deacon	18	-
Ulf Carter	19	-
Jack Evitt-Smith	21	-
Jack Haynes	24	-
Espen Moore-Mellem	25	-
Erik Gordon	37	GK
Stuart Jackson	38	-
Alex Ward	42	-
Oliver Corcoran	57	-
Cormac Åhlström Horgan	77	-
-	-	Manager
-	-	Coach
-	-	Coach
