= Davos Cup =

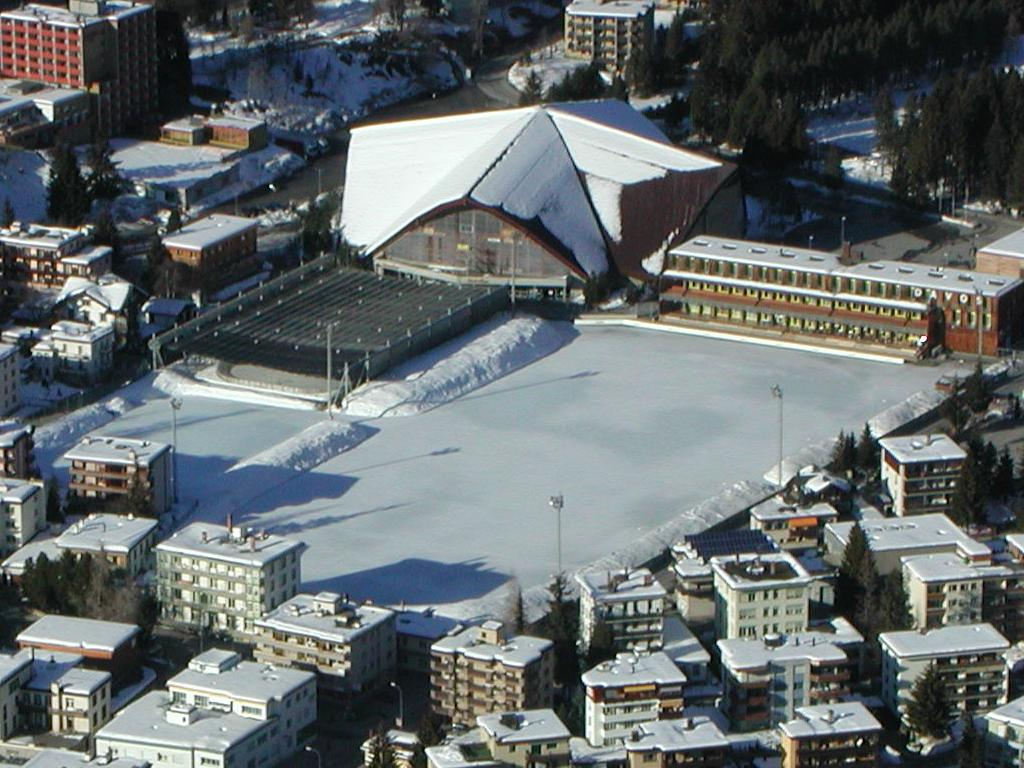
Eisstadion Davos in 2005

The Davos Cup was a bandy tournament held in 2016 for national teams from continental Europe.

== History ==
In January 2016 the Federation of International Bandy together with the Federation of Swiss Bandy arranged a tournament in Davos. Due to recent weather conditions and in line with what had been done at the 1913 European Bandy Championships, the games were not played with modern 11 man teams but on a smaller bandy field with 7 men on each team and without corners. Estonia, Germany, and Netherlands played the tournament. The Estonians won this unofficial European Championship, followed by the Netherlands and Germany.

This tournament was a follow-up of the 2014 Davos tournament.

== Results table ==
Result	Сountry	P	W	D	L	G	+/-	Points
1	Estonia	4	4	0	0	17—6	+11	8
2	Netherlands	4	2	0	2	13—9	+4	4
3	Germany	4	0	0	4	3—18	-15	0
