= National Bandy Association =

National Bandy Association was the first English governing body for the team winter sport of bandy, and actually the first bandy governing body anywhere in the world. The association was founded in 1891. The first general rules for bandy were written down by Englishman Charles Goodman Tebbutt in 1882. Bandy was a popular sport in England until the First World War, and the England national bandy team won the 1913 European Bandy Championships, but then the English lost interest in the sport and the National Bandy Association was discontinued.

== Modern successor ==
The Bandy Federation of England was founded in 2010 with the intent of reviving the sport in England and has been a member of the Federation of International Bandy since its founding year. It was renamed the Great Britain Bandy Association in 2017.
