= Great Britain Bandy Association =

Sports governing body

The logo of the Great Britain Bandy Association.

The logo of the England Bandy Federation.

The Great Britain Bandy Association (GBBA) is the governing body of the sport of bandy in the United Kingdom. It is based in Littleport, at the border between Cambridgeshire and East Anglia. Formerly, the federation was named Bandy Federation of England. After years of low activity, the federation was restarted and given the name the England Bandy Federation in January 2017. In September 2017 the present name was adopted, as the federation widened its scope to all of the UK.

The men's Great Britain national bandy team made its debut at the 2019 Bandy World Championship. A Great Britain women's national bandy team has also been formed and made its international debut in 2022 at the 2022 Women's Bandy World Championship.

The Association planned to have a full-size indoor bandy field in the Littleport Ice Stadium, though the project was not funded (2018).

== Organisation ==
The organisation's President is Rev Lyn Gibb-de Swarte of Littleport, a past resident of Streatham in southwest London, where she was chair of the Streatham ice speed club, ice hockey club and of the association of ice clubs. Vice Presidents are Thomas Parker and Clare Ledbury. The chair is Andrew Hutchinson. The treasurer is Tammy Nichol Twallin. General Secretary, Fixtures and Minutes Secretary, Cathy Gibb-de Swarte. The president is also the project director of the Littleport Ice Stadium Project with plans for a 400 metres indoor speed skating oval and an inner ice pad 100 × 60 metres bandy pitch.

== History of bandy in England ==
Bandy has a proud history in Britain. England is seen as one of the sport's birthplaces, together with Wales and Russia where a similar game developed simultaneously. Games which can be seen as bandy were played in the Fens in the 19th Century. The first English governing body for bandy, the National Bandy Association, was founded in 1891. The first rules were written down by Charles Goodman Tebbutt in 1882.

Some English sports clubs had both football and bandy on their programme in the 19th Century, playing bandy when there was snow and ice in the winter time, for instance Nottingham Forest F.C. The match which was later dubbed the original bandy match, was held at the Crystal Palace in London in 1875. However, at the time, the game was called "hockey on the ice", probably as it was considered an ice variant of field hockey. The first international match took place in 1891 between the English Bury Fen Bandy Club and Haarlemsche Hockey & Bandy Club, the present HC Bloemendaal from the Netherlands. The same year, the National Bandy Association was started in England. England national bandy team won the 1913 European Bandy Championships in Davos, Switzerland, where national teams from eight countries played. Following the outbreak of the First World War, the interest for bandy vanished in England and the National Bandy Association was discontinued.

There is a renewed interest in the sport steered by the new Great Britain Bandy Federation. The president of the Football Association, Prince William, enthusiastically took part in a bandy event in Stockholm in January 2018.
