= 2025 Bandy World Championship =

International bandy tournament in Sweden

XLIII Bandy World Championship

Tournament details
- Host country: Sweden
- City: Lidköping (Division A), Uppsala (Division B)
- Venue(s): Sparbanken Lidköping Arena, Serwent Arena (in 2 host cities)
- Dates: 24–30 March (Division A); 11–15 March (Division B)
- Teams: 5 (Division A) and 5 (Division B)

Final positions
- Champions: Sweden (14th title)
- Runners-up: Finland
- Third place: Norway
- Fourth place: United States

Tournament statistics
- Games played: 14
- Goals scored: 190 (13.57 per game)
- Scoring leader(s): Division A (Sweden) Martin Landström (18 goals); Division B (Netherlands) William Reuser (17 goals)

Awards
- MVP: (Sweden) Martin Karlsson

The 2025 Bandy World Championship for men, Division A, and the 2025 Women's Bandy World Championship were played in Lidköping, Sweden, on 24th – 30th March 2025. For the second time, the men's world championship and the women's world championship were played at the same arena and interwined with each other. The Division B tournament for men was played in Uppsala between the 10th and 14th of March.

Originally the Division A tournament was scheduled to be played with 6 participating teams. Kazakhstan was forced to withdraw its participation. The decision was made after the country's Ministry of Tourism and Sports chose not to provide financial support to the Kazakh national team.

== Venues ==
All matches were played in Sparbanken Lidköping Arena, Lidköping and Serwent Arena, Uppsala.

Sweden
Lidköping	Uppsala
Venue; Sparbanken Lidköping Arena	Venue; Serwent Arena

== Qualified nations ==
=== Division A ===
Finland
Hungary
Norway
Sweden
(United States) USA

=== Division B ===
Germany
(United Kingdom) Great Britain
Netherlands
Slovakia
Switzerland

== Division A ==
=== Preliminary round ===
All times are local (UTC+1 for matches from 25 to 29 March, UTC+2 from 30 March).

Pos	Team	Pld	W	D	L	GF	GA	GD	Pts	Qualification
1	Sweden (H)	4	4	0	0	60	8	+52	8	Semifinals
2	Finland	4	3	0	1	34	8	+26	6	Semifinals
3	Norway	4	2	0	2	37	14	+23	4	Semifinals
4	United States	4	1	0	3	7	39	−32	2	Semifinals
5	Hungary	4	0	0	4	3	72	−69	0	

Source: FIB
(H) Hosts
24 March 2025
15:30

United States	4–2	Hungary
Mikael Lickteig 23', 33'; Lucas Philippenko 38', 58'	Report	Robert Thelin 30', 46'

Sparbanken Lidköping Arena, Lidköping
Attendance: 187
24 March 2025
19:00

Sweden	9–3	Norway
Christoffer Fagerström 24'; Christoffer Edlund 31', 36', 70'; Martin Hammarberg 46', 90'; Martin Landström 47', 82'; Nicklas Ögren 52'	Report	Marius Mörch 15'; Tyler Myrmo 17'; Tobias Mofjeli 52'

Sparbanken Lidköping Arena, Lidköping

25 March 2025
13:00

Sweden	31–0	Hungary
Martin Landström 3', 11', 26', 34', 39', 63', 64', 67', 85'; Alexander Harndahl 15', 24', 35', 51'; Christoffer Edlund 18', 33'; Oscar Wikblad 19', 43', 63', 79'; Christoffer Fagerström 22', 27', 36'; Alexander Härndahl 31', 32', 70'; Viktor Spångberg 48'; Vladimir In-Fa-Lin 55', 87'; Ludvig Johansson 57'; Joel Broberg 69'; Martin Karlsson 78'; Nicklas Ögren 90'	Report

Sparbanken Lidköping Arena, Lidköping
25 March 2025
20:30

Norway	0–3	Finland
	Report	Teemu Määttä 13', 72'; Tuukka Ässämäki 93'

Sparbanken Lidköping Arena, Lidköping
Attendance: 1,139

26 March 2025
17:00

Finland	17–0	Hungary
Emil Fedorov 3', 4', 77'; Tuukka Ässämäki 10', 29', 46'; Mathis Lehtonen 19'; Niklas Holopainen 25', 64'; Jaakko Hyvönen 32', 43', 87'; Teemu Määttä 37', 63'; Tero Liimatainen 48'; Patrick Backman 67'; Topi Saukkonen 91'	Report

Sparbanken Lidköping Arena, Lidköping
26 March 2025
19:30

Sweden	12–2	United States
Oscar Wikblad 2', 26'; Martin Landström 6', 39', 60', 62'; Christoffer Edlund 19', 68'; Alexander Härndahl 22'; Martin Hammarberg 30'; Self goal 33'; Vladimir In-Fa-Lin and 76'	Report	Mike Fabie 50'; Daren Richardson 83'

Sparbanken Lidköping Arena, Lidköping
Attendance: 1,311

27 March 2025
14:30

United States	0–11	Finland
	Report	Matias Lehtonen 18'; Teemu Määttä 29'; Riku Hämäläinen 29', 40', 77'; Niklas Holopainen 30'; Emil Fedorov 32'; Jaakko Hyvönen 49', 76'; Tuukka Ässämäki 82'; Tero Liimatainen 83'

Sparbanken Lidköping Arena, Lidköping
27 March 2025
19:30

Hungary	1–20	Norway
Linus Schellin 65'	Report	Felix Callander 1', 60', 67'; Petter Löyning 13'; Nikolai Rustad Jensen 19'; Fritiof Hagberg 23', 46'; Marius Mörk Andersen 28'; Marius Mörch Andersen 39', 55', 56', 73'; Mathias Farnes 59', 75'; Tobias Mofjell 60'; Johan Mörch Andersen 71'; Fredrik Nordby 74', 84', 89'; Thomas Staerkeby 91'

Sparbanken Lidköping Arena, Lidköping
Attendance: 788

28 March 2025
17:00

United States	1–14	Norway
Kevin Brown 43'	Report	Felix Ljungberg 2'; Tyler Myrmo 11'; Fredrik Nordby 13', 42', 63', 81', 90', 92'; Tobias Mofjell 34'; Marius Mörch Andersen 39', 78'; Fritiof Hagberg 40'; Petter Löyning 50'; Jonas Röine 74'

Sparbanken Lidköping Arena, Lidköping
28 March 2025
19:30

Sweden	8–3	Finland
Christoffer Edlund 3', 49', 69', 87'; Oscar Wikblad 12', 27', 47'; Vladimir In-Fa-Lin 71'	Report	Samuli Helavuori 20'; Niklas Holopainen 34', 88'

Sparbanken Lidköping Arena, Lidköping

=== Knockout stage ===
==== Bracket ====
Semifinals
29 March
Sweden	22
United States	0
29 March
Finland	5
Norway	2

Final
30 March
Sweden	5
Finland	3
Third place
30 March
Norway	12
United States	1

==== Semifinals ====
29 March 2025
15:30

Finland	5–2	Norway
Samuli Helavuori 4', 69'; Kalle Lempien 29'; Riku Hämäläinen 85'; Tero Liimatainen 89'	Report	Felix Callander 24'; Marius Mörch Andersen 25'

Sparbanken Lidköping Arena, Lidköping

29 March 2025
18:00

Sweden	22–0	United States
Vladimir In-Fa-Lin 19', 35'; Christoffer Edlund 20', 34', 68'; Christofer Fagerström 26', 48', 53', 56', 58'; Oscar Wikblad 40', 49', 75'; Martin Landström 48', 66', 78', 82'; Joel Broberg 54', 72'; Alexander Härndahl 70', 83', 92'	Report

Sparbanken Lidköping Arena, Lidköping

==== Third place game ====
30 March 2025
09:30

Norway	12–1	United States
Nikolai Rustad Jensen 3', 10'; Petter Löyning 6'; Fredrik Nordby 13'; Marius Mörch Andersen 17'; Nikolai Rustad Jensen 23'; Felix Ljungberg 30'; Felix Callander 44', 89'; Jesper Wilhelmsen Tho 55'; Tobias Mofjel 86'; Fritiof Hagberg 94'	Report	Daren Richardson 91'

Sparbanken Lidköping Arena, Lidköping

==== Final ====
30 March 2025
16:00

Sweden	5–3	Finland
Oscar Wikblad 5', 93'; Vladimir In-Fa-Lin 38'; Martin Hammarberg 41'; Christoffer Edlund 52'	Report	Tatu Ässämäki 35'; Emil Fedorov 47', 85'

Sparbanken Lidköping Arena, Lidköping

=== Final ranking ===
Rank	Team
1st place, gold medalist(s)	Sweden
2nd place, silver medalist(s)	Finland
3rd place, bronze medalist(s)	Norway
4	United States
5	Hungary

== Division B ==
=== Preliminary round ===
All times are local (UTC+1).

Pos	Team	Pld	W	D	L	GF	GA	GD	Pts	Qualification
1	Netherlands	4	4	0	0	39	5	+34	8	Final
2	Germany	4	3	0	1	28	11	+17	6	Final
3	Great Britain	4	2	0	2	18	15	+3	4	Third place game
4	Switzerland	4	1	0	3	4	37	−33	2	Third place game
5	Slovakia	4	0	0	4	6	27	−21	0	

Source: FIB
10 March 2025
09:00

Netherlands	12–0	Switzerland
William Reuser 3', 4', 16', 26', 37', 43'; Mikkel Ebbing Hansen 14', 57', 60'; Remo Speijers 36', 39'; Jesse Kroes 60'	Report

Serwenthallen, Uppsala
Attendance: 63
10 March 2025
11:00

Germany	8–1	Slovakia
Maximilian Fichter 2'; Johan Koch 4', 33'; Nilas Houck 12'; Simon Framgardh 20', 37'; Simon Hjortenhed 31'; Bernhard Lüttke 53'	Report	Tobias Neckar 37'

Serwenthallen, Uppsala
Attendance: 67
10 March 2025
14:00

Great Britain	9–0	Switzerland
Jack Smith 3'; Espen Mellem-Moore 10', 23'; Steven Russel 10', 39', 49'; Travis Brannan 31'; Cormac Ahlström-Corgan 43'; Jacob Signeul 45'	Report

Serwenthallen, Uppsala
Attendance: 93

11 March 2025
11:00

Netherlands	7–3	Germany
William Reuser 17', 44', 56', 62'; Mikkel Ebbing Hansen 20', 55'; Remo Speijers 24'	Report	Johan Koch 4'; Philip Billington 31'; Simon Framgardh 33'

Serwenthallen, Uppsala
11 March 2025
14:00

Slovakia	2–4	Great Britain
Patrik Kosa 47'; Self goal 61'	Report	Jack Wright 6'; Espen Mellem-Moore 24'; Jack Smith 56', 51'

Serwenthallen, Uppsala
Attendance: 135

12 March 2025
09:00

Switzerland	4–3	Slovakia
Patrik Meyer 16', 36'; William Sandstedt 43'; Vitaly Iglin 66'	Report	Patrik Kosa 9', 61', 65'

Serwenthallen, Uppsala
12 March 2025
11:00

Germany	4–3	Great Britain
Johan Koch 12'; Simon Framgardh 44', 54', 62'	Report	Steven Russel 39'; Cormac Ahlstrom-Horgan 51'; Alex Smith 59'

Serwenthallen, Uppsala
12 March 2025
14:00

Netherlands	11–0	Slovakia
Robin Cras 4'; Stefan Geenen 8'; Vincent Hole-Ruigrok 13'; Remo Speijers 19'; Jasper Prins 36'; Dennis Vooren 39', 51'; Mikkel Ebbing Hansen 45'; William Reuser 47', 52', 62'	Report

Serwenthallen, Uppsala

13 March 2025
11:00

Great Britain	2–9	Netherlands
Ulf Carter 1'; Mikkel Ebbing Hansen 56'	Report	Vincent Hole-Ruigrok 5'; Mikkel Ebbing Hansen 7'; Robin Cras 18'; William Reuser 25', 33', 48'; Jordan Braam 27'; Espen Mellem-Moore 41'; Sander Heinsbroek 54'

Serwenthallen, Uppsala
Attendance: 99
13 March 2025
14:00

Germany	13–0	Switzerland
Johan Koch 6', 21', 40', 61'; Nilas Houck 9', 28'; Philip Billington 12', 38'; Simon Framgardh 17', 31', 59'; Konstantin Karmilin 18'; Eugen Kudrin 35'	Report

Serwenthallen, Uppsala
Attendance: 61

=== Final round ===
==== Third place game ====
14 March 2025
14:00

Great Britain	13–1	Switzerland
Steven Russel 19'; Jack Smith 28', 49', 55', 57'; Travis Brannan 39'; Jacob Signeul 42'; Cormac Ahlstrom-Horgan 43'; Jakob Moeller Haggerty 68'; Ulf Carter 78'; Alex Ward 80'; Robin Signeul 88'; Stuart Jackson 91'	Report	Patrik Meyer 47'

Serwenthallen, Uppsala
Attendance: 83

==== Final ====
14 March 2025
17:30

Netherlands	7–1	Germany
Mikkel Ebbing Hansen 8', 22', 46', 78'; Remo Speijers 25'; Sander Heinsbroek 37'; William Reuser 47'	Report	Johan Koch 31'

Serwenthallen, Uppsala
Attendance: 176

=== Final ranking ===
Rank	Team
1st place, gold medalist(s)	Netherlands
2nd place, silver medalist(s)	Germany
3rd place, bronze medalist(s)	Great Britain
4	Switzerland
5	Slovakia
