= National colours of Ukraine =

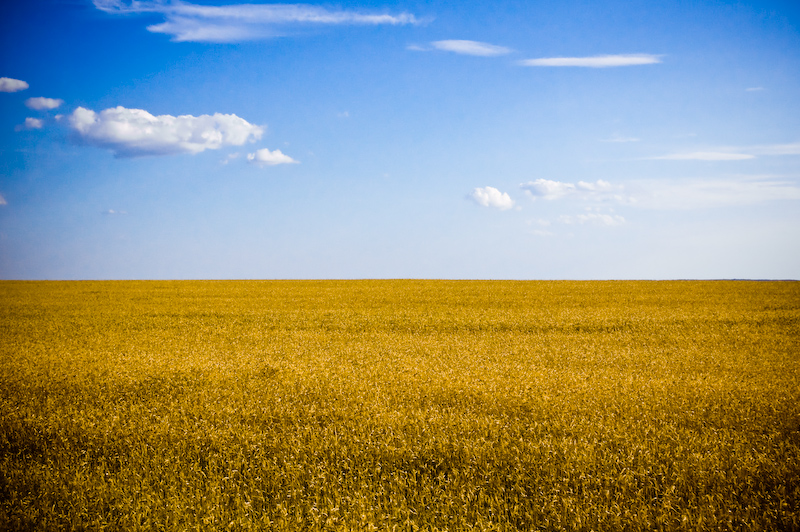
Typical agricultural landscape of Ukraine, Kherson Oblast

The national colours of Ukraine are usually identified as the combination of blue and gold in that order. These colours are the same as in the flag of Ukraine. The roots of Ukrainian national colours come from before Christian times when yellow and blue prevailed in traditional ceremonies, reflecting fire and water. The most solid proof of yellow and blue colours could be traced as far as the Battle of Grunwald at which militia formations from various lands of the Polish-Lithuanian Union participated. In maps of the 19th and 20th centuries, the territories of Ukraine were usually coloured yellow. The "gold" (Or) is nearly always represented by a shade of yellow, as there is no distinct colour "yellow" in heraldry; they both count as "Gold". There is a theory that the colors have arrived in the area of present-day Ukraine, together with the governor Prinz Władysław II Opolczyk, who established them to the Principality of Ruthenia on model of his native Upper Silesia.

Blue and gold are also national colours of Sweden, Palau and Kazakhstan.

== Origins ==
Scheme	Strong azure	Yellow
Pantone	Pantone Coated 2935 C	Pantone Coated Yellow 012 C
RAL	5019 Capri blue	1023 Traffic yellow
RGB color model	0, 91, 187	255, 213, 0
CMYK	100, 47, 0, 0	0, 4, 100, 0
HEX	#0057b8	#ffd700
Websafe	#0066cc	#ffcc00

The colors in the Ukrainian flag are often interpreted to represent golden fields of grain under a clear blue sky, appropriate for a country known as the "bread basket" of its area.

The Ukrainian flag was light blue over yellow prior to the establishment of the Soviet Republic. Used sparingly, blue signifies blue skies or air. It can be used to denote good health.

== Decorations ==
Ukraine's state coat of arms feature the same colours found on the Ukrainian flag; a blue shield with gold trident, called the tryzub, which means 'trident' (more literally 'three teeth'). It appears on the Presidential standard of Ukraine. Blue coloured tridents are considered to be irregular representation by the Ukrainian Heraldry Society.

In addition to the Hero of Ukraine Order, decorations that include or consist of the national colours are the Order of Prince Yaroslav the Wise, Order of Liberty, Order of Danylo Halytsky, Order of Merit, Order of Bohdan Khmelnytsky and Shevchenko National Prize.

== Sport ==
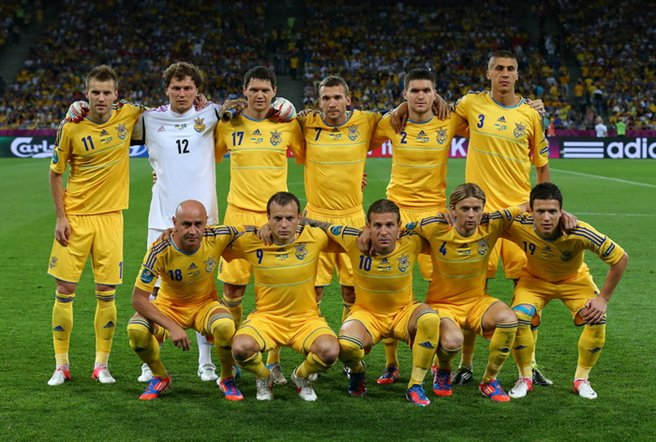
Ukraine national football team

In many international team sports Ukraine (such as in the Olympic Games), colours used for the team are yellow and blue, where the blue is often a very dark blue. These include National Olympic Committee of Ukraine, Ukraine men's national ice hockey team, Ukraine national basketball team, Ukraine national football team, and Ukraine national bandy team. The club team FC Metalist Kharkiv has also adopted these colours.

== Branding ==
Ukraine International Airlines current livery is a "Eurowhite" scheme, comprising a white fuselage with UIA titles and a Ukrainian flag. The tail is blue with a yellow line across it. This livery has been in use since the late 1990s. The tail was white with two thick blue lines, which tapered from the rear of the tail and met at a point towards the front bottom.
