= Four nation bandy tournament in 2014 =

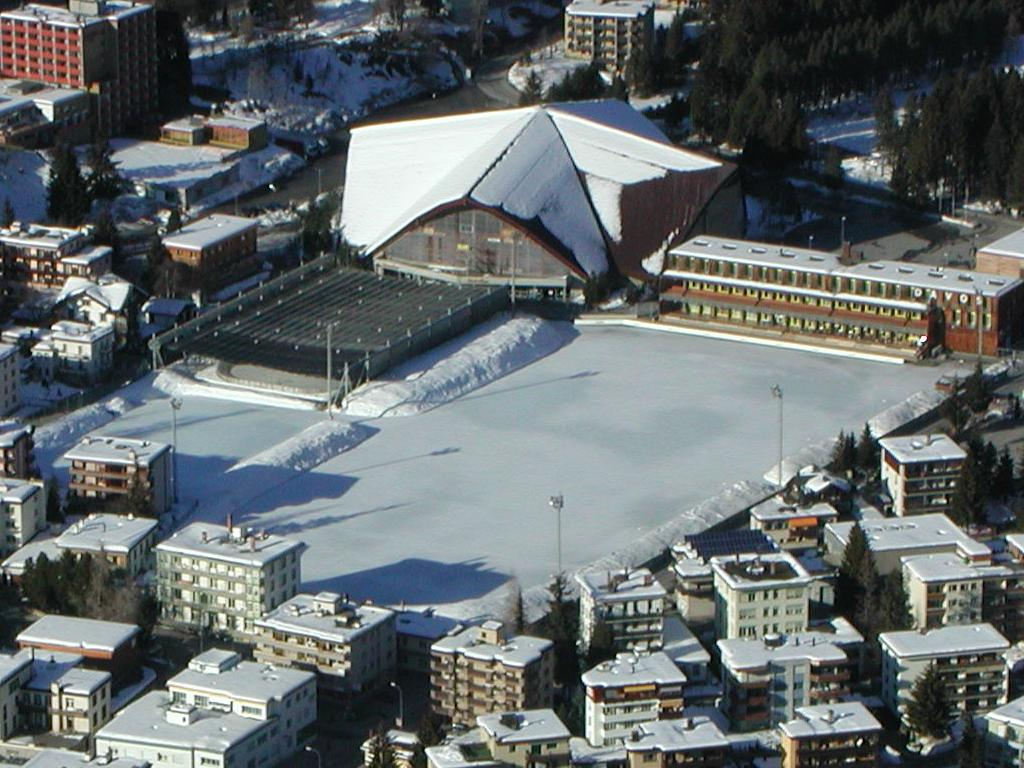
Eisstadion Davos in 2005

The four-nation bandy tournament in 2014 was a centenary celebration of the 1913 European Bandy Championships.

On 6 January 2014, the Federation of International Bandy and the Federation of Swiss Bandy arranged a four-nation tournament in Davos to celebrate the anniversary of the 1913 European Championship. Czech Republic, Germany, Hungary and the Netherlands played at the same venue as 101 years ago. The Dutch won this unofficial European Championship.

This tournament got a follow-up with the Davos Cup in 2016.

== Games ==
Date	Time (UTC+1)	Match	Result	Arena
6 January 2014	09:00	Hungary – Germany	7–2	Eisstadion Davos
6 January 2014	10:15	Czech Republic – Netherlands	1–4	Eisstadion Davos
6 January 2014	12:00	Czech Republic – Hungary	4–10	Eisstadion Davos
6 January 2014	13:15	Germany – Netherlands	0–5	Eisstadion Davos
6 January 2014	15:30	Germany – Czech Republic	4–9	Eisstadion Davos
6 January 2014	17:00	Hungary – Netherlands	1–3	Eisstadion Davos

== Results table ==
Result	Сountry	P	W	D	L	G	+/-	Points
1	Netherlands	3	3	0	0	12—2	+10	6
2	Hungary	3	2	0	1	18—9	+9	4
3	Czech Republic	3	1	0	2	14—18	-4	2
4	Germany	3	0	0	3	6—22	-16	0
