= Czech Association of Bandy =

Sports governing body in the Czech Republic

- Sport: bandy, rink bandy
- Founded: 2013
- Affiliation: FIB
- Affiliation date: 2014

Official website
- www.czechbandy.cz

Czech Association of Bandy (Czech: Česká Asociace Bandy) is the governing body for bandy and rink bandy in the Czech Republic. The association was founded in 2013 and became a member of the Federation of International Bandy in 2014.

The Czech Republic national bandy team is controlled by the association.
