= Netherlands national bandy team =

Netherlands
- Association: Bandy Bond Nederland
- Team colors

Bandy World Championship
- Appearances: 20 (first in 1991)
- Best result: 5th (2026)

The Dutch national bandy team represents the Netherlands in the sport of bandy.

The team made its international championship debut at the 1913 European Bandy Championships in Davos, Switzerland. However, the Netherlands did not compete in the Bandy World Championship before the 1990s, even if bandy actually has been played more or less regularly in the Netherlands since the early 20th Century. The Netherlands participated in their first World Championship tournament in 1991 and has been attending the tournaments regularly since the 2003 championship.

By the 1991 World Championship the team had the traditional Dutch orange jerseys, but before that the colours of the flag.

On 6 January 2014 the Dutch won a four nation tournament in Davos, a centenary celebration of the European Championship of 1913. The other teams were Czech Republic, Hungary, and Germany. The Netherlands also took part in the 2016 Davos Cup.

The current team is controlled by the Bandy Bond Nederland.

== World Championships ==
- 1991 – 8th place
- 1993 – 8th place
- 1997 – 9th place
- 2003 – 9th place (4th in Division B)
- 2004 – 11th place (6th in Division B)
- 2005 – 9th place (3rd in Division B)
- 2006 – 10th place (4th in Division B)
- 2007 – 10th place (4th in Division B)
- 2008 – 11th place (5th in Division B)
- 2009 – 11th place (5th in Division B)
- 2010 – 9th place (3rd in Division B)
- 2011 – 11th place (5th in Division B)
- 2012 – 11th place (5th in Division B)
- 2013 – 12th place (6th in Division B)
- 2014 – 11th place (5th in Division B)
- 2015 – 12th place (4th in Division B)
- 2016 – 14th place (6th in Division B)
- 2017 – 15th place (7th in Division B)
- 2018 – 9th place (1st in Division B)
- 2019 – 8th place
- 2020 – (5th in Division B)
- 2023 – 8th place (3rd in Division B)
- 2025 – 6th place (1st in Division B)
- 2026 – 5th place

== Team Netherlands International Record ==
Updated as of the 2026 World Championship

Netherlands Overall Record 1991-2026
Country	Games Played	Wins	Draws	Losses	Win%	Goals For	Goals Against	Goal Difference	First Match	Last Match
Netherlands	131	45	10	76	34.4	426	671	-245	17.3.1991	17.1.2026

International Record 1991-2026
Country	Games Played	Wins	Draws	Losses	Win%	Goals For	Goals Against	Goal Difference	First Match	Last Match
Hungary	26	9	1	16	34.6	71	106	-35	17.3.1991	17.1.2026
Mongolia	10	5	3	2	50	25	26	-1	1.2.2006	27.1.2017
China	4	4	0	0	100	29	3	26	2.2.2015	28.1.2018
Slovakia	5	4	0	1	80	30	4	26	29.1.2018	12.3.2025
Estonia	15	4	1	10	26.7	44	59	-15	26.3.2003	2.2.2018
Somalia	3	3	0	0	100	43	3	40	1.2.2015	30.1.2018
Switzerland	3	3	0	0	100	29	0	29	3.3.2020	10.3.2025
Japan	6	3	1	2	50	16	14	2	24.1.2013	5.3.2020
Germany	7	3	0	4	42.9	42	44	-2	2.2.2015	14.3.2025
Ukraine	3	2	1	0	66.7	11	6	5	24.1.2013	2.3.2020
Czech Republic	4	2	2	0	50	14	8	6	24.1.2017	25.3.2023
Latvia	11	2	1	8	18.2	35	50	-15	31.1.2007	6.3.2020
United Kingdom	1	1	0	0	100	9	2	7	13.3.2025	13.3.2015
Finland	1	0	0	1	0	0	16	-16	14.1.2026	14.1.2016
Sweden	1	0	0	1	0	0	28	-28	13.1.2026	13.1.2016
Belarus	5	0	0	5	0	5	39	-34	29.3.2003	3.2.2012
Norway	2	0	0	2	0	0	35	-35	30.1.2019	12.1.2026
Canada	13	0	0	13	0	13	104	-91	18.3.1991	26.1.2017
United States	11	0	0	11	0	10	124	-114	20.3.1991	16.1.2026
