= German Bandy Federation =

Sports governing body in Germany

- Deutscher Bandy-Bund
- Logo of the federation.
- Formation: 2013
- Type: Governing body
- Purpose: Governing body for the sport of bandy
- Location: Germany
- Website: bandy-bund.de

German Bandy Federation (German: Deutscher Bandy-Bund) is the governing body for the sport of bandy in Germany.

German Bandy Association was founded and became member of the Federation of International Bandy in 2013. An earlier German bandy federation had been a member of FIB for just over a year in 1990-1991.

A national rink bandy championship has been played every year since the winter of 2014/15.

Germany managed to qualify for the A Division of the 2017 Bandy World Championship and was able to defend this position so the Germany national bandy team will be playing in the A Division in 2018 too.
