= Bandy Bond Nederland =

Governing body for bandy in the Netherlands

The logo of the association.

Bandy Bond Nederlands is the governing body for bandy in the Netherlands and is controlling the Netherlands national bandy team.

Bandy was introduced to the Netherlands by Pim Mulier in 1891 and the Nederlandsche Hockey en Bandy Bond, organising field hockey and bandy, was founded on 8 October 1898. In the 1920s and 1930s ice hockey increasingly became a tough competitor to bandy. The federation eventually let go of bandy and was renamed the Nederlandse Hockey Bond in 1935. However, bandy was still played by som clubs during the 1950s and 1960s. Sometimes it was played as rink bandy. By 1971 the new Nederlandse Bandy Federatie was founded. It became a member of the Federation of International Bandy in 1973 (or the International Bandy Federation, as it was known at the time), as the first non-founding member. The federation was merged into Skate Bond Nederland some decades later but since 2012 the sport has its own national federation again, in Bandy Bond Nederland.
