= Youth Bandy World Championship =

International bandy competitions

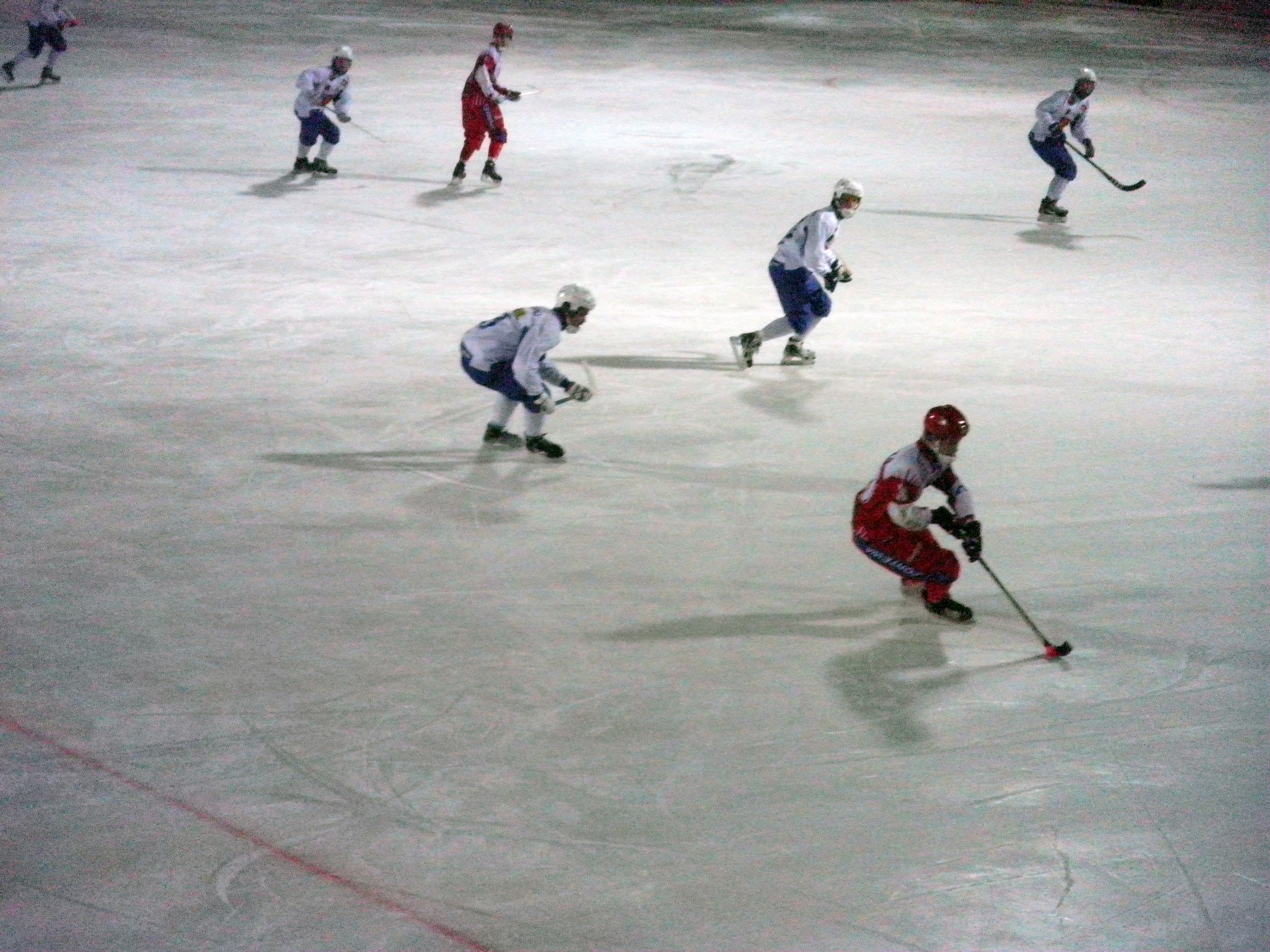
- Russia vs. Finland at the World Championship Y23 in 2011
- Status: Active
- Genre: Youth sports events
- Location: Various
- Major events: Bandy
- Organiser: Federation of International Bandy
- Member: Sweden, Russia, Finland, Ukraine, Norway, Kazakhstan, USA, Canada, C.I.S., Soviet Union

The Bandy World Championship for youth teams is a group of sports tournaments held for bandy athletes competing for their junior national teams. There are four different age classes for boys and young men and one age class for girls. The tournaments are governed by the Federation of International Bandy.

== Age classes ==
The following tournaments are held regularly:

- World Championship G17 – for girls' teams up to age 17

G17 is sometimes written as F17 and the Y designations may also be written with a U

- World Championship Y15 – for boys' teams up to age 15
- World Championship Y17 – for boys' teams up to age 17
- World Championship Y19 – for young men's teams up to age 19
- World Championship Y23 – for young men's teams up to age 23

== G17 ==
The first World Championship G17 was held in 2009 and it has since been held every other year.

=== G17 Champions ===
- 2009 Russia
- 2011 Sweden
- 2013 Sweden
- 2015 Sweden
- 2017 Sweden
- 2019 Sweden

== Y15 ==
The first World Championship Y16 was held in 1994. Starting with 2002, it has been for Y15 teams since. The 2020 World Championship Y15 tournament in Arkhangelsk, Russia, was cancelled.

=== Y15 Champions ===
- 1994 Sweden
- 1995 Russia
- 1996 Finland
- 1998 Sweden
- 2002 Russia
- 2004 Finland
- 2006 Sweden
- 2008 Russia
- 2010 Sweden
- 2012 Russia
- 2014 Russia
- 2016 Russia
- 2018 Russia
- 2020 Cancelled

== Y17 ==
The first World Championship Y17 was held in 1975, the next in 1979. The Soviet Union took part in both 1975 and 1979 but did not win a medal until the third installment in 1981. In 1995 and 1997 it was Y18 teams instead of Y17.

=== Y17 Champions ===
- 1975 Sweden
- 1979 Finland
- 1981 Sweden
- 1983 Soviet Union
- 1985 Sweden
- 1987 Soviet Union
- 1989 Sweden
- 1991 Sweden
- 1993 Sweden
- 1995 Sweden
- 1997 Russia
- 1999 Sweden
- 2001 Sweden
- 2003 Russia
- 2005 Russia
- 2007 Russia
- 2009 Russia
- 2011 Russia
- 2013 Finland
- 2015 Russia
- 2016 Russia
- 2017 Russia
- 2018 Sweden
- 2019 Russia
- 2020 Russia
- 2021
- 2022
- 2023 Sweden
- 2024 Finland
- 2025 Sweden
- 2026 Sweden

== Y19 ==
World Championship Y19 has been held biannually since 1968. In 1994 and 1996 it was Y20 teams instead.

=== Y19 Champions ===
- 1968 Sweden
- 1970 Soviet Union
- 1972 Sweden
- 1974 Soviet Union
- 1976 Soviet Union
- 1978 Sweden
- 1980 Soviet Union
- 1982 Sweden
- 1984 Sweden
- 1986 Soviet Union
- 1988 Sweden
- 1990 Sweden
- 1992 Sweden
- 1994 Russia
- 1996 Sweden
- 1998 Russia
- 2000 Sweden
- 2002 Sweden
- 2004 Russia
- 2006 Sweden
- 2008 Russia
- 2010 Sweden
- 2012 Russia
- 2014 Russia
- 2016 Sweden
- 2017 Russia
- 2018 Russia
- 2019 Russia
- 2020 Russia
- 2021 not held
- 2022 Sweden
- 2023 Sweden
- 2024 Sweden

== Y23 ==
World Championship Y23 were held in 1990 and in 1992, but then the next was not held until 2011. In 2016, 2017 and 2019 it was Y21 teams instead.

=== Y23 Champions ===
- 1990 Soviet Union
- 1992 Sweden
- 2011 Russia
- 2013 Russia
- 2016 Sweden
- 2017 Sweden
- 2019 Russia

== See also ==
- Bandy World Championship G-17
- Bandy World Championship Y-19
- Bandy World Championship Y-21
- Bandy World Championship
- Women's Bandy World Championship
