= 2023 Bandy World Championship =

Bandy tournament in Sweden

XLII Bandy World Championship

Tournament details
- Host country: Sweden
- City: Växjö (Åby)
- Venue(s): Eriksson Arena (in 1 host city)
- Dates: 28 March – 2 April (Division A); 24–27 March (Division B)
- Teams: 5 (Division A) and 6 (Division B)

Final positions
- Champions: Sweden (13th title)
- Runner-up: Finland
- Third place: Norway
- Fourth place: Kazakhstan

Tournament statistics
- Games played: 33
- Goals scored: 274 (8.3 per game)
- Attendance: 5,542 (168 per game)
- Scoring leader(s): Division A (Sweden) Christoffer Edlund (12 goals); Division B (Netherlands) William Reuser (13 goals)

Awards
- MVP: (Sweden) Martin Landström

Official website
- 2023 Men's and Women's Bandy World Championship 2023

The 2023 Bandy World Championship was an international bandy tournament between bandy playing nations. The tournament was played in Åby, a subdivision of Växjö City in Sweden. Two separate tournaments for men's national teams and women's national teams took place. This Bandy World Championship marked an important development for the sport at the international level. For the first time the men's world championships took place at the same time and in the same arena as the Women's Bandy World Championship which served as the international female equivalent for the sport known as the 2023 Women's Bandy World Championship. This article deals chiefly with the men's world competition.

According to original plans, the 2023 championship tournament would have been hosted by Russia, but since Russia is excluded from international play due to the Russo-Ukrainian War, the idea was brought forward during autumn of 2022 that a world championship should be arranged in Sweden instead. With the permission of the Federation of International Bandy, the Swedish Bandy Association therefore sent an invitation, in the form of an inquiry of interest, to all countries which at the 2019 Bandy World Championship qualified to compete in the A Division of the next world championship, except Russia. Countries invited are thus Finland, Norway, Kazakhstan, United States, Germany, Estonia, and Hungary.

The national men's bandy teams from Latvia and Estonia decided not to participate in the 2023 tournament. Other member national bandy federations which had previously competed but would not compete in 2023 stated costs as the main factor preventing them from participating in the event.

No A Division of a world championship has been played since 2019, which is why the qualification at that year's championship has been the basis for the invitations. In 2020 the A Division was cancelled due to the COVID-19 pandemic and in 2021 there was no world championship at all for the same reason. The 2022 Bandy World Championship was to be played in Russia, but it was cancelled since most countries did not want to play in or against Russia following the 2022 Russian invasion of Ukraine. Four national teams decided to withdraw after the invasion began.

== Venues ==
All matches were played in Eriksson Arena, Åby.

Both men's and women's games take place in Åby, a subdivision of Växjö City in Sweden	Sweden	
Both men's and women's games take place in Åby, a subdivision of Växjö City in Sweden	Åby	
Both men's and women's games take place in Åby, a subdivision of Växjö City in Sweden	Venue; Eriksson Arena; Capacity: 2,000	
Both men's and women's games take place in Åby, a subdivision of Växjö City in Sweden	Founded	13 November 2019

== Doping detection dog ==
The world's first doping detection dog will be present for the tournament, an 8-year-old Springer Spaniel named Molly. Molly will be used to detect certain banned substances that are not allowed as per the World Anti-Doping Agency's (WADA) prohibited list.

== Qualified nations ==
=== Division A ===
Finland
Kazakhstan
Norway
Sweden
(United States) USA

=== Division B ===
Czech Republic
Germany
Hungary
Netherlands
Slovakia
Switzerland

== Division A ==
=== Preliminary round ===
Pos	Team	Pld	W	D	L	GF	GA	GD	Pts	Qualification
1	Sweden (H)	4	3	1	0	43	5	+38	7	Final
2	Finland	4	3	1	0	31	6	+25	7	Final
3	Norway	4	2	0	2	23	26	−3	4	Third place game
4	Kazakhstan	4	1	0	3	9	28	−19	2	Third place game
5	United States	4	0	0	4	5	46	−41	0	

Source: FIB
(H) Hosts
28 March
10:30

United States	0–14	Finland
	Report	Tero Liimatainen 11'; Kalle Lempinen 17'; Riku Hämäläinen 25'; Jimi Heinonen 32', 55'; Teemu Määttä 45', 47'; Casper Hänninen 50'; Emil Fedorov 52', 54'; Jaakko Hyvönen 69'; Niklas Holopainen 72'; Tommi Määttä 80'; Topi Saukkonen 82'

Eriksson Arena, Åby
Attendance: 160
Referee: Mats Eriksson
28 March
13:30

Norway	2–16	Sweden
Nikolai Rustad Jensen 75'; Fredrik Nordby 78'	Report	Erik Pettersson 3'; Dennis Henriksen 8'; Martin Landström 10', 36'; Martin Karlsson 13', 73'; Oskar Wikblad 23', 27', 43', 45', 77'; Albin Airisniemi 41'; Christoffer Edlund 49' 60', 69'; Joel Broberg 90'

Eriksson Arena, Åby
Attendance: 163
Referee: Mats-Olof Gustafsson

29 March
12:00

Finland	8–1	Kazakhstan
Jimi Heinonen 10'; Jaakko Hyvönen 17', 31'; Emil Fedorov 27'; Riku Hämäläinen 46'; Tuomas Liukkonen 82', 83'; Kalle Lempinen 83'	Report	Rauan Issaliyev 33'

Eriksson Arena, Åby
Attendance: 25
Referee: Jonas Kandell
29 March
16:30

Sweden	13–1	United States
Albin Airisniemi 1', 21'; Christoffer Edlund 5', 18', 37', 46', 51', 83'; Martin Landström 33', 36'; Erik Pettersson 47'; Christoffer Fagerström 53'; Joel Broberg 85'	Report	Daren Richardson 45'

Eriksson Arena, Åby
Attendance: 163
Referee: Mats-Olof Gustafsson

30 March
10:00

Finland	7–3	Norway
Emil Fedorov 9', 17', 34', 78', 83'; Kalle Lempinen 45'; Tero Liimatainen 47'	Report	Petter Yngve Löining K 36'; Nikolai Rustad Jensen 41'; Fritiof Hagberg 79'

Eriksson Arena, Åby
Attendance: 94
Referee: Jonas Kandell
30 March
16:30

Kazakhstan	7–2	United States
Rauan Issaliyev 4', 85'; Kuanysh Temiralin 19', 28'; Maxim Utebaliyev 45', 86'; Petr Gribanov 57'	Report	Evan Richardson 33'; Mikael Lickteig 80'

Eriksson Arena, Åby
Attendance: 82
Referee: Mats Eriksson

31 March
12:30

Kazakhstan	1–6	Norway
Denis Maximenko 42'	Report	Petter Yngve Löining 6', 22', 28'; Markus Fremstad 14'; Tobias Tinius Mofjell 72'; Fritiof Hagberg 88'

Eriksson Arena, Åby
Attendance: 103
Referee: Mats-Olof Gustaffson
31 March
19:00

Sweden	2–2	Finland
Martin Karlsson 2', 58'	Report	Jimi Heinonen 19', 51'

Eriksson Arena, Åby
Attendance: 1,009
Referee: Mats Eriksson

1 April
11:30

United States	2–12	Norway
Mikael Lickteig 81'; Kevin Brown 90'	Report	Felix Callander 1'; Fredrik Nordby 25', 65', 89'; Markus Fremstad 28'; Petter Yngve Löining 37'; Fritiof Hagberg 39', 62'; Alv Sandaroe 44'; Nikolai Rustad Jensen 58', 84'; Tobias Tinius Mofjell 91'

Eriksson Arena, Åby
Attendance: 192
Referee: Jonas Kandell
1 April
16:30

Kazakhstan	0–12	Sweden
	Report	Martin Karlsson 1'; Dennis Henriksen 14'; Erik Pettersson 30', 79'; Christoffer Edlund 36', 88'; Christoffer Fagerström 57', 60'; Ted Hedell 59'; Joel Broberg 65'; Oskar Wikblad 86', 90'

Eriksson Arena, Åby
Attendance: 478
Referee: Mats-Olof Gustafsson

=== Final Round ===
==== Third place game ====
2 April
10:15

Norway	5–1	Kazakhstan
Nikolai Rustad Jensen 3', 9', 43', 90'; Fredrik Nordby 78'	Report	Samat Amanshin 35'

Eriksson Arena, Åby
Attendance: 223
Referee: Jonas Kandell

==== Final ====
2 April
16:30

Sweden	3–1	Finland
Martin Landström 26'; Joel Broberg 41'; Christoffer Edlund 43'	Report	Teemu Määttä 35'

Eriksson Arena, Åby
Attendance: 1,946
Referee: Mats-Olof Gustafsson, Andreas Lindvall Viktorsson, Andreas Jebsen Mikkelsen

=== Final ranking ===
Rank	Team
1st place, gold medalist(s)	Sweden
2nd place, silver medalist(s)	Finland
3rd place, bronze medalist(s)	Norway
4	Kazakhstan
5	United States

=== Awards ===
Best players selected by the directorate:

- Best Goaltender: (Finland) Kimmo Kyllönen
- Best Defenceman: (Sweden) Linus Pettersson
- Best Midfielder: (Sweden) Martin Landström
- Best Forward: (Sweden) Erik Pettersson
- MVP: (Sweden) Martin Landström

== Division B ==
=== Preliminary round ===
Pos	Team	Pld	W	D	L	GF	GA	GD	Pts	Qualification
1	Germany	5	4	0	1	32	16	+16	8	Semi-finals
2	Netherlands	5	4	0	1	31	10	+21	8	Semi-finals
3	Hungary	5	3	0	2	24	12	+12	6	Semi-finals
4	Slovakia	5	2	1	2	17	18	−1	5	Semi-finals
5	Czech Republic	5	1	1	3	13	21	−8	3	5th–6th place game
6	Switzerland	5	0	0	5	2	42	−40	0	5th–6th place game

Source: FIB
24 March
9:00

Netherlands	11–0	Switzerland
William Reuser 5', 21', 45', 48', 51'; Robin Cras 12', 57'; Sander Heinsbroek 13'; Alexander Cras 33'; Hidde Bakker 46'; Sverre Tveitan 55'	Report

Eriksson Arena, Åby
Attendance: 25
Referee: Jacob Liljegren
24 March
11:00

Germany	4–6	Slovakia
David Kall 24', 38'; Maximilian Fichter 43'; Michael Dunaev 30'	Report	Martin Grell 5', 13', 28'; Oliver Šanko 22', 54'; Michal Klejna 60'

Eriksson Arena, Åby
Attendance: 23
Referee: Anti Malaska
24 March
13:00

Hungary	7–0	Czech Republic
Robert Thelin 1', 43', 59', 61'; Balázs Gáspár 7'; Dennis Pacsay 42'; André Berglönn 53'	Report

Eriksson Arena, Åby
Attendance: 21
Referee: Niclas Schultz
24 March
16:00

Slovakia	1–6	Netherlands
Damián Iglovský 61'	Report	Sverre Tveitan 5'; Jordan Braam 20'; Alexander Cras 36', 53'; Robin Cras 46'; Joris Vriezen 56'

Eriksson Arena, Åby
Attendance: 32
Referee: Jacob Liljegren
24 March
18:00

Czech Republic	3–6	Germany
Marek Mastik 15'; Ondrej Suk 43'; Jan Petr 55'	Report	Bernhard Luttke 13'; Michael Dunaev 32', 49', 51'; Niklas Kvamme-elger 39'; Sergej Naab 59'

Eriksson Arena, Åby
Attendance: 31
Referee: Anti Malaska
24 March
20:00

Switzerland	1–7	Hungary
Jari Koponen 24'	Report	Dennis Pacsay 11', 38'; Jesper Nagy 21'; Robert Thelin 27'; Péter Jankovics 45'; Boldizsár Béres 49', 57'

Eriksson Arena, Åby
Attendance: 43
Referee: Niklas Schultz

25 March
8:00

Germany	6–3	Hungary
Michael Dunaev 3', 24'; Alexander Kolyagin 18', 32', 35', 53'	Report	Robert Thelin 14'; Jesper Nagy 25'; Dennis Pacsay 58'

Eriksson Arena, Åby
Attendance: 28
Referee: Anti Malaska
25 March
10:00

Slovakia	7–1	Switzerland
Imrich Tarnoczy 6', 59'; Stanislav Opavský 7', 21', 52'; Julius Sinkovic 19', 15'	Report	Jari Koponen 43'

Eriksson Arena, Åby
Attendance: 19
Referee: Niclas Schultz
25 March
12:00

Czech Republic	1–6	Netherlands
Renee Skala 34'	Report	William Reuser 4', 20'; Robin Cras 14'; Mees van Wijchen 37'; Sverre Tveitan 53'; Jordan Braam 61'

Eriksson Arena, Åby
Attendance: 53
Referee: Jacob Liljegren
25 March
15:00

Slovakia	1–5	Hungary
Martin Grell 42'	Report	Balázs Gáspár 11'; Robert Thelin 19', 36'; Dennis Pacsay 21'; Jesper Nagy 44'

Eriksson Arena, Åby
Attendance: 42
Referee: Anti Malaska
25 March
17:00

Switzerland	0–7	Czech Republic
	Report	Renee Skala 9', 26', 40'; Jakub Sarse 29'; Jiri Doskocil 34'; Michal Knapek 48'

Eriksson Arena, Åby
Attendance: 86
Referee: Niklas Schultz
25 March
19:00

Netherlands	4–6	Germany
William Reuser 8', 24'; Stan Vroon 10'; Sverre Tveitan 15'	Report	Elias Hjortenhed 5'; Alexander Kolyagin 11', 31', 53'; Anatoli Elenski 39'; Michael Dunaev 57'

Eriksson Arena, Åby
Attendance: 83
Referee: Jacob Liljegren

26 March
8:00

Czech Republic	2–2	Slovakia
Renee Skala 28', Tomas Benak 30'	Report	Michal Klejna 35', Oliver Šanko 63'

Eriksson Arena, Åby
Attendance: 18
Referee: Niklas Schultz
26 March
10:00

Germany	10–0	Switzerland
Alexander Kolyagin 3', 4'; Michael Dunaev 6', 13'; Anatoli Elenski 15', 29'; Sergej Naab 19'; Elias Hjortenhed 28', 53'; Bernhard Luttke 40'	Report

Eriksson Arena, Åby
Attendance: 62
Referee: Jakob Liljegren
26 March
12:00

Netherlands	4–2	Hungary
William Reuser 6', 25', 59'; Wessel Hole-Ruigrok 49'	Report	André Berglönn 27'; Robert Thelin 53'

Eriksson Arena, Åby
Attendance: 80
Referee: Anti Malaska

=== Final Round ===
==== Semi-finals ====
26 March
17:00

Germany	8–5	Slovakia
David Kall 3', 49'; Alexander Kolyagin 8', 14', 18'; Michael Dunaev 21', 50'; Alexander Kolyagin 60'	Report	Imrich Tarnoczy 1'; Oliver Šanko 28'; Michal Klejna 31'; Julius Sinkovic 52'; Peter Benes 57'

Eriksson Arena, Åby
Attendance: 40
Referee: Jacob Liljegren
26 March
19:00

Netherlands	0–2	Hungary
	Report	Dennis Pacsay 1'; Balázs Kocsány 52'

Eriksson Arena, Åby
Attendance: 55
Referee: Anti Malaska

==== 5th–6th place game ====
26 March
15:00

Czech Republic	4–2	Switzerland
Renee Skala 14', 31'; Jiri Doskocil 16'; Simon Vresansky 35'	Report	Patrik Meyer 1'; Gian Luca Beeler 57'

Eriksson Arena, Åby
Attendance: 23
Referee: Niclas Schultz

27 March
13:00

Switzerland	2–4	Czech Republic
Vitaly Iglin 21'; Gian Luca Beeler 35'	Report	Renee Skala 2', 60'; Tomas Benak 6'; Lukas Bretzina 28'

Eriksson Arena, Åby
Attendance: 7
Referee: Niclas Schultz

==== Third place game ====
27 March
15:00

Slovakia	0–4	Netherlands
	Report	William Reuser 19'; Robin Cras 47'; Alexander Cras 56'; Sverre Tveitan 60'

Eriksson Arena, Åby
Attendance: 51
Referee: Anti Malaska

==== Final ====
27 March
17:00

Germany	1–2	Hungary
Michael Dunaev 29'	Report	Dennis Pacsay 60', 63'

Eriksson Arena, Åby
Attendance: 82
Referee: Jacob Liljegren

=== Final ranking ===
Rank	Team
1st place, gold medalist(s)	Hungary
2nd place, silver medalist(s)	Germany
3rd place, bronze medalist(s)	Netherlands
4	Slovakia
5	Czech Republic
6	Switzerland
