= Christoffer Edlund =

Swedish bandy player (born 1987)

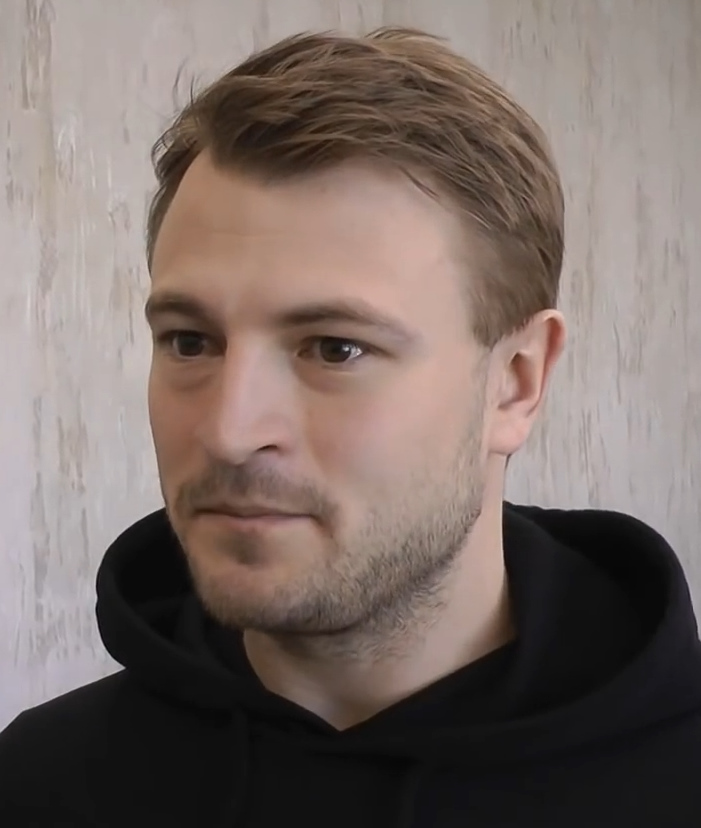
- Edlund in 2019

Personal information
- Born: 3 February 1987 (age 39)
- Playing position: Midfielder; Forward

Club information
- Current team: Villa Lidköping BK
- Number: 21

Youth career
- Vetlanda BK

Senior career*
Years	Team	Apps^{†}	(Gls)^{†}
2008–2009	Vetlanda BK	110	(108)
2009–2014	Sandvikens AIK	153	(380)
2014–2015	Yenisey	30	(62)
2015–2019	Sandvikens AIK	35	(74)
2019–2020	Yenisey	31	(60)
2020–	Villa Lidköping BK	29	(78)

National team
2003–2004	Sweden U17		
2004–2006	Sweden U19		
2008–	Sweden		
Medal record
Men's bandy
Representing Sweden
World Championships
Gold medal – first place	2009 Västerås	Team
Gold medal – first place	2010 Moscow	Team
Gold medal – first place	2017 Sandviken	Team
Gold medal – first place	2025 Lidköping	Team
Silver medal – second place	2014 Irkutsk	Team
Silver medal – second place	2015 Khabarovsk	Team
Silver medal – second place	2018 Khabarovsk	Team
- * Senior club appearances and goals counted for the domestic league only. † Appearances (Goals).

Christoffer Edlund (born 3 February 1987) is a Swedish bandy player who currently plays for Villa Lidköping BK as a midfielder or forward.

== Career ==
=== Club career ===
Edlund is a youth product of Vetlanda BK where he remained until 2008–09. 2009–10 to 2013–14 he played for Sandvikens AIK.

In 2014, Edlund joined Russian team Yenisey for one year. With Yenisey, Edlund won the Russian Championship and scored one goal in the final.

After one year with Yenisey, Edlund returned to Sandvikens AIK.

On 30 December 2022, he scored his 1 000th goal in the Swedish top division, when Villa Lidköping BK defeated IFK Vänersborg, 10–2, in an away game.

=== International career ===
Edlund has played for the Swedish U19 squad when he played during 2005–06 season.

He was part of Swedish World Champions teams of 2009, 2010, 2017, 2023, and 2025. At the 2023 Bandy World Championship, Edlund led all Division A scorers with 12 goals as Sweden went on to win their 13th World Championship.

== Honours ==
=== Country ===
Sweden

- Bandy World Championship: 2009, 2010, 2017, 2023, 2025

== Personal life ==
His father is Kent Edlund, former professional bandy player and coach, world champion (1987) and champion of Sweden (1985/1986, 1990/1991 and 1991/1992) for Vetlanda BK.
