= Germany national bandy team =

Germany
- Association: Deutscher Bandy-Bund
- Head coach: (Russia) Alexandr Yepifanov
- Team colors

First international
- Hungary 7–2 Germany (Davos, Switzerland; 6 January 2014)

Biggest win
- Somalia 1–22 Germany (Irkutsk, Russia; 27 January 2014)

Biggest defeat
- Sweden 34–6 Germany (Sandviken, Sweden; 2 February 2017)

Bandy World Championship
- Appearances: 6 (first in 2014)
- Best result: 7th (2017, 2018, 2019)

Germany national bandy team (German: Deutsche Bandynationalmannschaft der Herren) is a bandy team competing for Germany in the international bandy and rink bandy tournaments.

The German Empire national bandy team participated the 1913 European Bandy Championships in Davos.

After a long time with no organised bandy in Germany, the German Bandy Federation (Deutscher Bandy-Bund) was established in June 2013 and the new national bandy team was formed in September 2013. In January 2014 the German team participated in the four nation bandy tournament in Davos, Switzerland, a centenary celebration of the 1913 European Championship. The other teams were Netherlands, Hungary, and Czech Republic. Germany made its debut in the World Championship in Irkutsk 2014. Before that they played a friendly match against the team of Obukhovo

19-20 September 2015 the team took part in a rink bandy tournament in Nymburk. The team also participated at the 2016 Davos Cup.

At the World Championship in 2016, the team won Division B and as a consequence thereof debuted in Division A at the 2017 tournament, where they finished 7th, thereby qualifying for 2018.

== Tournament participation ==
=== World Championships ===
- 2014 – 15th place (7th in Division B)
- 2015 – 13th place (5th in Division B)
- 2016 – 9th place (1st in Division B)
- 2017 – 7th place
- 2018 – 7th place
- 2019 – 7th place
- 2023 – 7th place (2nd in Division B)
- 2025 – 7th place (2nd in Division B)
- 2026 – (Division B)

== Team Germany International Record ==
Updated as of the 2026 World Championship

Germany Overall Record 2014-2026
Country	Games Played	Wins	Draws	Losses	Win%	Goals For	Goals Against	Goal Difference	First Match	Last Match
Germany	49	26	5	18	53.1	300	319	-19	27.1.2014	21.3.2026

International Record 2014-2026
Country	Games Played	Wins	Draws	Losses	Win%	Goals For	Goals Against	Goal Difference	First Match	Last Match
Hungary	7	5	0	2	71.4	52	24	28	4.2.2015	27.3.2023
Netherlands	7	4	0	3	57.1	44	42	2	2.2.2015	11.3.2025
Switzerland	3	3	0	0	100	28	2	26	26.3.2023	20.3.2026
Somalia	2	2	0	0	100	34	2	32	27.1.2014	2.2.2015
China	2	2	0	0	100	16	6	10	3.2.2015	13.2.2016
Czech Republic	2	2	0	0	100	10	5	5	24.3.2023	17.3.2026
Slovakia	3	2	0	1	66.6	20	12	8	24.3.2023	10.3.2025
Ukraine	4	2	1	1	50	18	17	1	29.1.2014	18.3.2026
Belarus	2	1	1	0	50	19	14	5	31.1.2017	4.2.2017
Japan	2	1	1	0	50	7	5	2	29.1.2014	5.2.2015
Mongolia	2	1	0	1	50	5	5	0	28.1.2014	1.2.2015
United Kingdom	3	1	0	2	33.3	9	20	-11	12.3.2025	19.3.2026
Estonia	1	0	1	0	0	7	7	0	12.2.2016	12.2.2016
Latvia	1	0	0	1	0	3	9	-6	30.1.2014	30.1.2014
United States	3	0	1	2	0	15	30	-15	30.1.2017	30.1.2019
Kazakhstan	1	0	0	1	0	2	17	-15	31.1.2018	31.1.2018
Russia	1	0	0	1	0	1	26	-25	2.2.2018	2.2.2018
Sweden	1	0	0	1	0	6	34	-28	2.2.2017	2.2.2017
Norway	2	0	0	2	0	4	42	-38	1.2.2017	28.1.2019

== Current squad ==
German squad at the 2014 World Championship in Irkutsk, Russia.

Pos.	Age	Name	Club
GK	37	Mikhail Entaltsev
GK	33	Sören Löbrich
	44	Dimitri Antropov
	57	Sergei Bitkov
	34	Maxim Bulankin
	35	Michael Dunaev
	35	Johann Engelbrecht
	28	Evgeny Epifanov
		Dimitri Fichter
	37	Alexei Gebel
	41	Dmitri Kusmin
	19	Ulf Niklas Laue
	35	Nikita Obolkin
	33	Hauke Sander
	24	Steffen Walter Schlicht
		Oleg Schiebelbein
	23	Marcus Wigh
	34	Maxim Zinger
	39	Pavel Zinger
	16	Alexander Zislin
	45	Igor Zislin
