= 1913 European Bandy Championships =

1913 edition of the European Bandy Championships

1913 European Bandy Championships was, according to some sources, a European Championship tournament for national teams in bandy held in February 1913 in Saint-Moritz or in Davos, Switzerland, but there are no known contemporary sources for this and the oldest known source for the competition being held is from a Swedish book on bandy from the 1970s, itself not citing any sources. It is likely that the information could be a mixup with the actual 1913 LIHG Championship in Saint Moritz or the actual 1913 Ice Hockey European Championship in Munich, which were ice hockey tournaments between ice hockey teams from different European countries.

While it probably should be considered a factoid, the tournament has still been referred to as if it was a historical fact in many books and magazines about bandy and even led to a centenary celebration tournament being arranged by the Federation of International Bandy in 2014.

== Overview ==
The 1913 European Championship were supposedly played by national teams representing Austria, England, Belgium, Germany, Italy, Netherlands, France, and Switzerland. It is usually claimed to have been arranged by the International Ice Hockey Federation established in 1908 and that the teams were 7-men-teams.

Since Sweden and Russia followed the rules of 11-men teams, they are supposed to have rejected the invitation and competed in the 1913 Nordic Games in Stockholm, where a bandy competition actually took place. The 1913 Nordic Games were arranged at the same time as the European Championship competition should have taken place. The German team consisted mostly of the members of Leipziger SC, which was supposed to play in Stockholm as well, but because many of its players were selected for the German national team, they decided to travel to Switzerland.

== Revivals ==
On 6 January 2014, the Federation of International Bandy arranged a four nation tournament in Davos to celebrate the anniversary of the alleged 1913 European Championship. Czech Republic, Germany, Hungary and Netherlands played at the same venue as was thought to have been used for the competition 101 years ago. The Dutch won this unofficial European Championship.

In 2016, a somewhat smaller tournament dubbed the Davos Cup was held with national teams from three European countries and was won by Estonia.

== See also ==
- European Cup (bandy)
