= Slovakia national bandy team =

National sports team

Slovakia national bandy team is competing for Slovakia in the international bandy and rink bandy tournaments.

The debut came in a friendly rink bandy match against the Czech Republic, and the first international tournament was the European Rink Bandy Cup 2017 in Nymburk.

The country made its World Championship debut in the 2018 tournament.

== Tournament participation ==
=== World Championships ===
- 2018 – 15th place (7th in Division B)
- 2019 – 16th place (8th in Division B)
- 2020 – 3rd place in Division B
- 2023 – 9th place (4th in Division B)
- 2025 – 10th place (5th in Division B)
