= Ukraine national bandy team =

National sports team

Ukraine
- Association: Ukrainian Bandy and Rink bandy Federation
- Team colors
Home colours	Away colours

First international
- 2013 Bandy World Championship

Biggest win
- 2020 – Division B

Bandy World Championship
- Appearances: 2013, 2014, 2016, 2017, 2018, 2019, 2020 (first in 2013)
- Best result: (silver) Senior: 2nd; (Division B); 2020; Y15: 4th; 2014

Medal record

Bandy World Championships
	2013 Norway and Sweden	Team
	2014 Russia	Team
	2015 Russia	Withdrew
Bronze medal – third place	2016 Russia; Division B	Team
	2017 Sweden	Team
	2018 China and Russia	Team
	2019 Sweden	Team
Silver medal – second place	Russia 2020; Division B	
	2022 Russia	Cancelled

Medal record

Y15 Youth Bandy World Championship
	2014 Russia	Team
	2015 Russia	Withdrew
	2016 Russia	Team
	2017 Sweden	Team
	2018 Russia	Did not compete
	2020-22 Russia	Cancelled

The Ukraine national bandy team is Ukraine's national representative in the winter team sport of bandy. Two national teams exist, one for men and one for women. Both teams are organized by the Ukrainian Bandy and Rink bandy Federation. A national junior boys team has also competed internationally for Ukraine. This article deals chiefly with the men's senior national team. The national team's kit is in the Ukrainian colours of yellow and blue.

The Ukraine national men's bandy team made its debut at the 2013 Bandy World Championship. The Ukraine women's national bandy team was scheduled to make its world debut at the 2022 Women's Bandy World Championship but had to withdraw due to the 2022 Russian invasion of Ukraine. The Ukraine women's national bandy team made its debut at the 2023 Women's Bandy World Championship in Sweden, finishing 6th.

== History ==
The national team made its debut at the men's 2013 Bandy World Championship (XXXIIIrd), and also participated at the 2014 Bandy World Championship (XXXIVth). For the 2015 Bandy World Championship, the team withdrew for political reasons due to the conflict with Russia over Crimea. At the 2016 Bandy World Championship (XXXVIth) they returned, capturing bronze in Division B, currently the national team's best performance in history.

The men's national team did not participate in the 2022 Bandy World Championship which was to be the first time the men's tournament was to be held since the COVID-19 pandemic outbreak. The tournament was cancelled due to the unforeseen impact of the 2022 Russian invasion of Ukraine. The invasion also caused significant damage to the sport's infrastructure in Ukraine; the "Saltivskyi lid" rink in Kharkiv was hit by rocket attacks, and training for national teams was relocated to Dnipro.

== World Championship record ==
=== Seniors ===
The Ukraine national men's senior bandy team began competing in the Bandy World Championship making its debut at the 2013 Bandy World Championship. It did not compete in the 2015, 2022, or 2023 tournaments.

Bandy World Championship
Year	Location	Result
2013	Norway and Sweden	8th (Division B)
2014	(Russia) Irkutsk and Shelekhov	8th (Division B)
2015	Withdrew due to the conflict with Russia over Crimea	
2016	(Russia) Ulyanovsk Oblast, Ulyanovsk	Bronze (Division B)
2017	(Sweden) Slättbergshallen in Trollhättan	5th (Division B)
2018	(China) Harbin, Heilongjiang	6th (Division B)
2019	(Sweden) Vänersborg	9th (Division B)
2020	(Russia) Irkutsk	Silver (Division B)
2022	Tournament cancelled due to the Russian invasion of Ukraine	
2023	Did not enter	

=== Y15 Ukraine ===
Y15 Bandy World Championship
Year	Location	Result
2014	Russia	4th
2016	Russia	Did not compete
2018	Russia	Did not compete
2020	Tournament cancelled due to the COVID-19 pandemic	
2022	Tournament cancelled due to the Russian invasion of Ukraine	

== Team Ukraine Senior ==
=== 2013 Seniors ===
The Ukraine national bandy team competed in the 2013 Bandy World Championship in Division B with the following roster:

=== 2014 Seniors ===
The Ukraine national bandy team competed in the 2014 Bandy World Championship in Division B with the following roster:

=== 2015 Seniors ===
The Ukraine national bandy team did not compete in the 2015 Bandy World Championship. The national team withdrew from the tournament due to the conflict with Russia over Crimea.

=== 2016 Seniors ===
The Ukraine national bandy team competed in the 2016 Bandy World Championship in Division B with the following roster:

=== 2017 Seniors ===
The Brändö municipality in Finland was sponsor of the Ukraine national bandy team at the 2017 Bandy World Championship. The Ukraine national bandy team competed in the 2017 World Championship in Division B with the following roster:

Pos.	Number	Name
Goalkeeper		Andrii Kurudz
Goalkeeper		Dmytro Balashov
Field player		Oleh Chykariev
Field player		Oleksandr Badamshyn
Field player		Dmytro Ziuz
Field player		Sergii Mozgovoi
Field player		Viacheslav Kuzmin
Field player		Dmytro Tsymbal
Field player		Illia Ivanov
Field player		Roman Levchenko
Field player		Yurii Suzdalev
Field player		Andrii Vershetskyi
Field player		Matviy Khotyaintsev
Field player		Anton Lozovoi
Field player		Ivan Shvedchenko
Field player		Andrey Markovichenko
Field player		Mykhailo Skalytskyi
Field player		Oleksandr Mitlenko
Administrative and coaching staff
Head coach		Magnus Alm
Coach		Sergii Babenko
UBRF President		Ihor Skalytskyi
Press Officer		Hennadii Babenko

=== 2018 Seniors ===
The Ukraine national bandy team competed in the 2018 Bandy World Championship in Division B.

=== 2019 Seniors ===
The Ukraine national bandy team competed in the 2019 Bandy World Championship in Division B.

=== 2020 Seniors ===
The Ukraine national bandy team competed in the 2020 Bandy World Championship in Division B.

=== 2021 Seniors ===
The Ukraine national bandy team did not compete in the 2021 Bandy World Championship because it was cancelled due to the COVID-19 pandemic.

=== 2022 Seniors ===
The Ukraine national bandy team did not compete in the 2022 Bandy World Championship which was cancelled due to the Russian invasion of Ukraine.

== Team Ukraine Junior ==
The Bandy World Championship for youth teams are held in a number of different age classes and are held regularly for athletes who do not compete for the national senior team. The following are the age classes for males:

- World Championship Y15 – for boys' teams up to age 15
- World Championship Y17 – for boys' teams up to age 17
- World Championship Y19 – for young men's teams up to age 19
- World Championship Y23 – for young men's teams up to age 23

The first World Championship Y16 was held in 1994. Since 2002, it has been for Y15 teams only.

=== 2014 Y15 ===
The following was the Ukrainian youth team squad for the 2014 Y15 Youth Bandy World Championship who finished in 4th place:

Pos.	Number	Name	Club
Goalkeeper	1	Georgiy Sosyedka
Goalkeeper	20	Ignat Lemeshevskii
	2	Dmytro Poperezhai	Dnipro Dnipropetrovsk
	3	Bohdan Suzdalev	Dnipro Dnipropetrovsk
	4	Dmytro Bereza	Dnipro Dnipropetrovsk
	5	Artem Zakharchenco
	6	Mykhaylo Skalyts'kyy	Dnipro Dnipropetrovsk
	7	Mykola Baranov
	8	Yevgeniy Medvedyev
	10	Ilia Nasekin
	11	Ivan Sharkov
	13	Volodymyr Golets	Dnipro Dnipropetrovsk
	15	Sergiy Terent'yev	Dnipro Dnipropetrovsk
	21	Oleksandr Malko
	22	Semyon Zavarinski
	25	Mykhaylo Ivanov	Dnipro Dnipropetrovsk
Team Staff
Head coach
Assistant coach
Assistant coach
Trainer

=== 2015 Y15 ===
The Ukraine national youth team did not compete in the 2015 Y15 Youth Bandy World Championship. The national Y15 team withdrew from the tournament due to the conflict with Russia over Crimea. The intended roster had been as follows:

1. Yuri Vyborov (gk)
2. Arkadiy Nagoga
3. Kyrylo Shmatchenko
4. Sergei Smurov
5. Anton Riapolov
6. Kiril Dolgikh
7. Bogdan Arabov
8. Artur Sysoev
9. Evgenii Gromnitskii
10. Volodymyr Golets
11. Mykhaylo Skalyts`kyy
12. Maksym Melnychuk (gk)
13. Ivan Shvvedchenko
14. Bohdan Sukharov

=== 2016 Y15 ===
The Ukrainian youth team squad competed in the 2016 Y15 Youth Bandy World Championship.

=== 2020 Y15 ===
The 2020 World Championship Y15 tournament in Arkhangelsk, Russia, was cancelled.

== Notable players ==
- Суздалев Юрій Васильович, Suzdalev Yuriy Vasyliovych

== Gallery ==
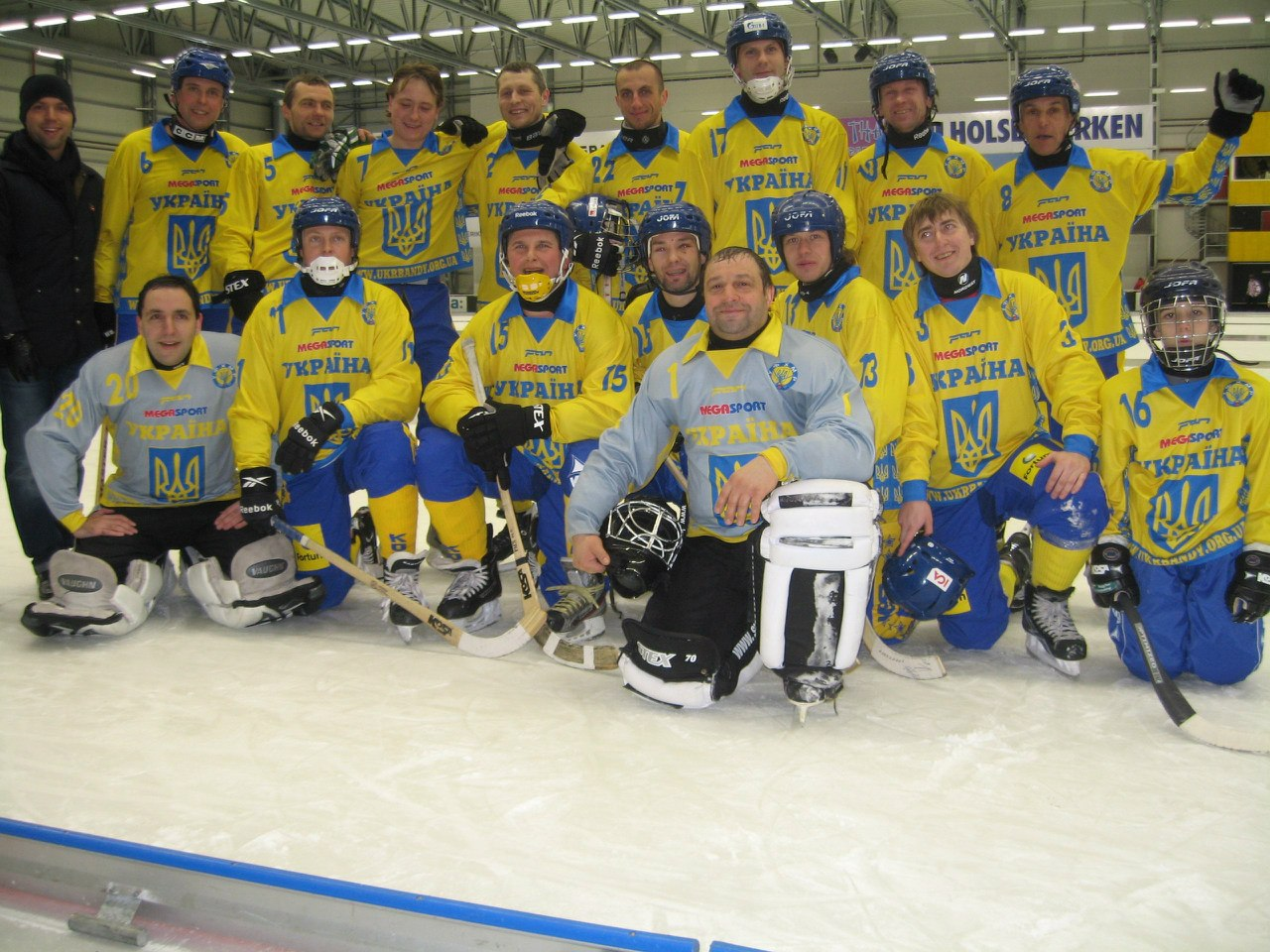
Ukraine at the 2013 Bandy World Championship

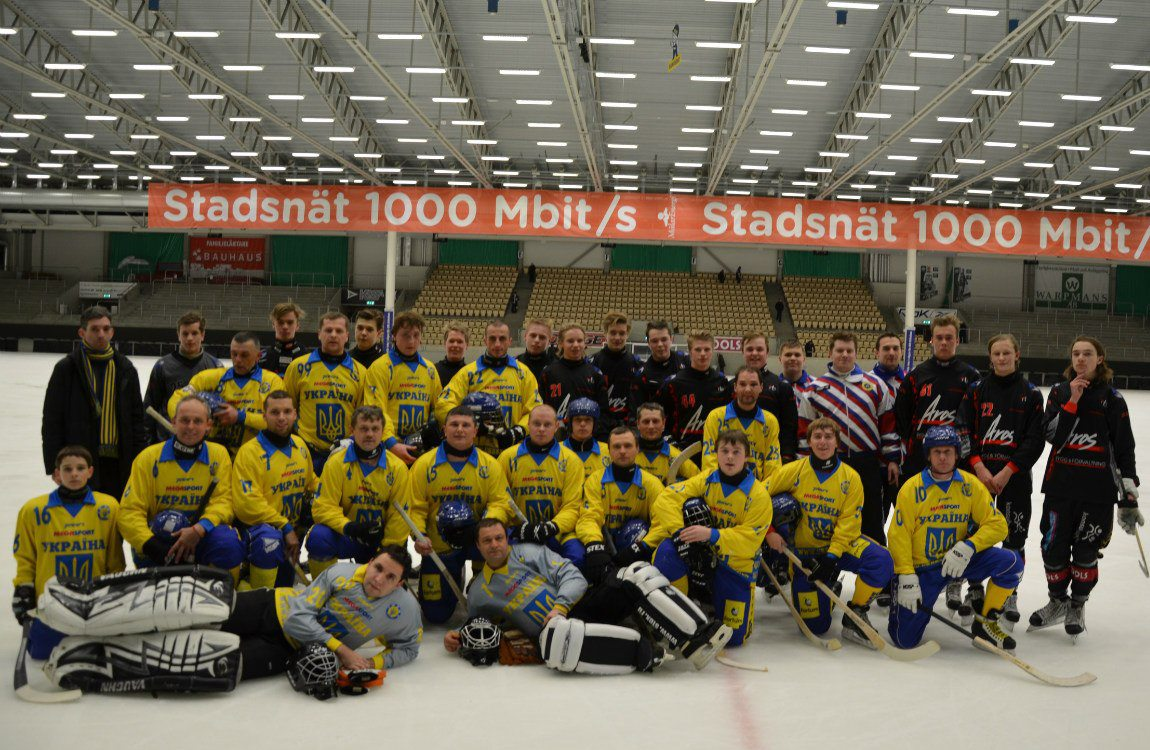
Ukraine at the 2013 Bandy World Championship

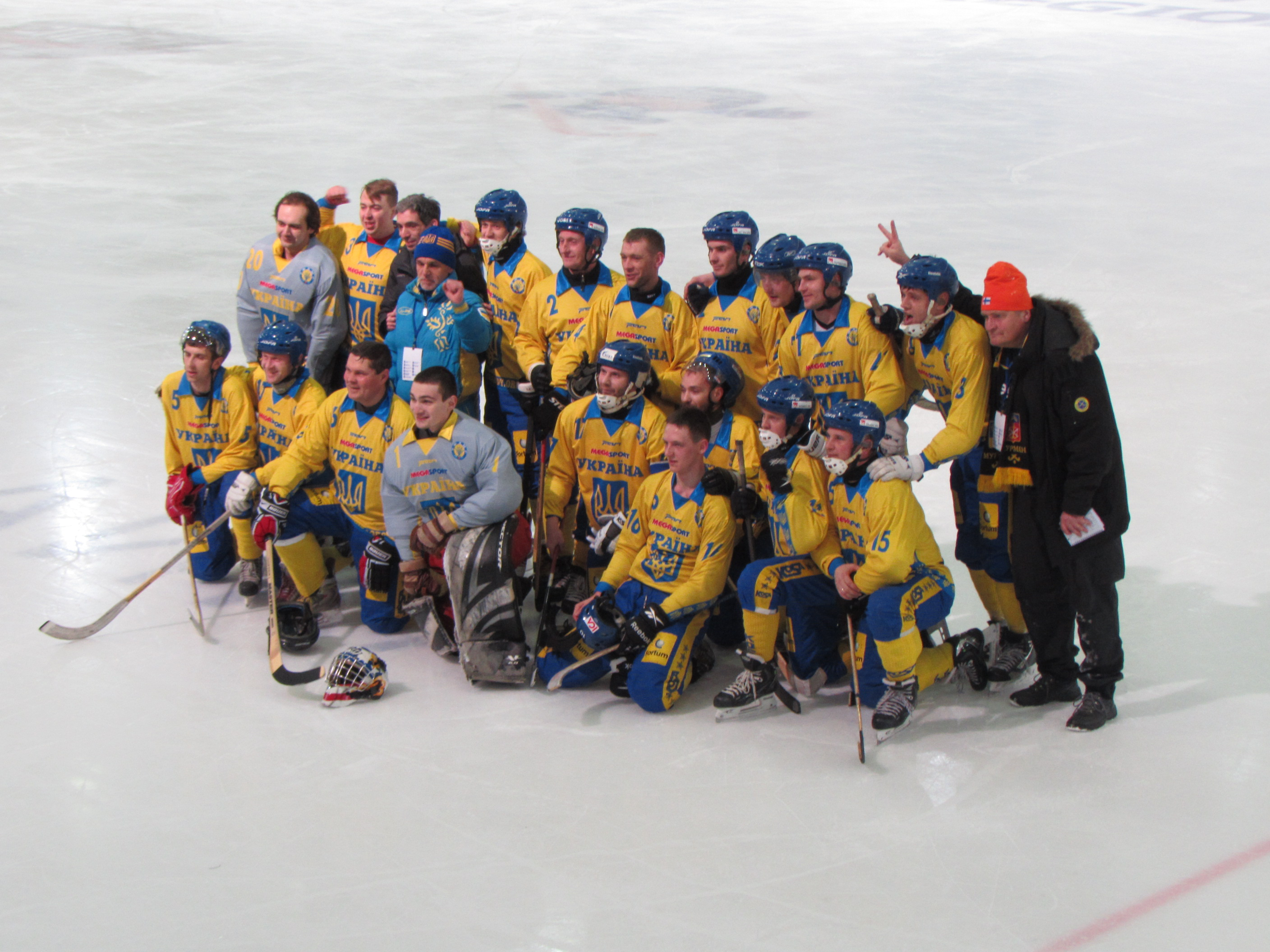
Ukraine national men's bandy team in February 2016

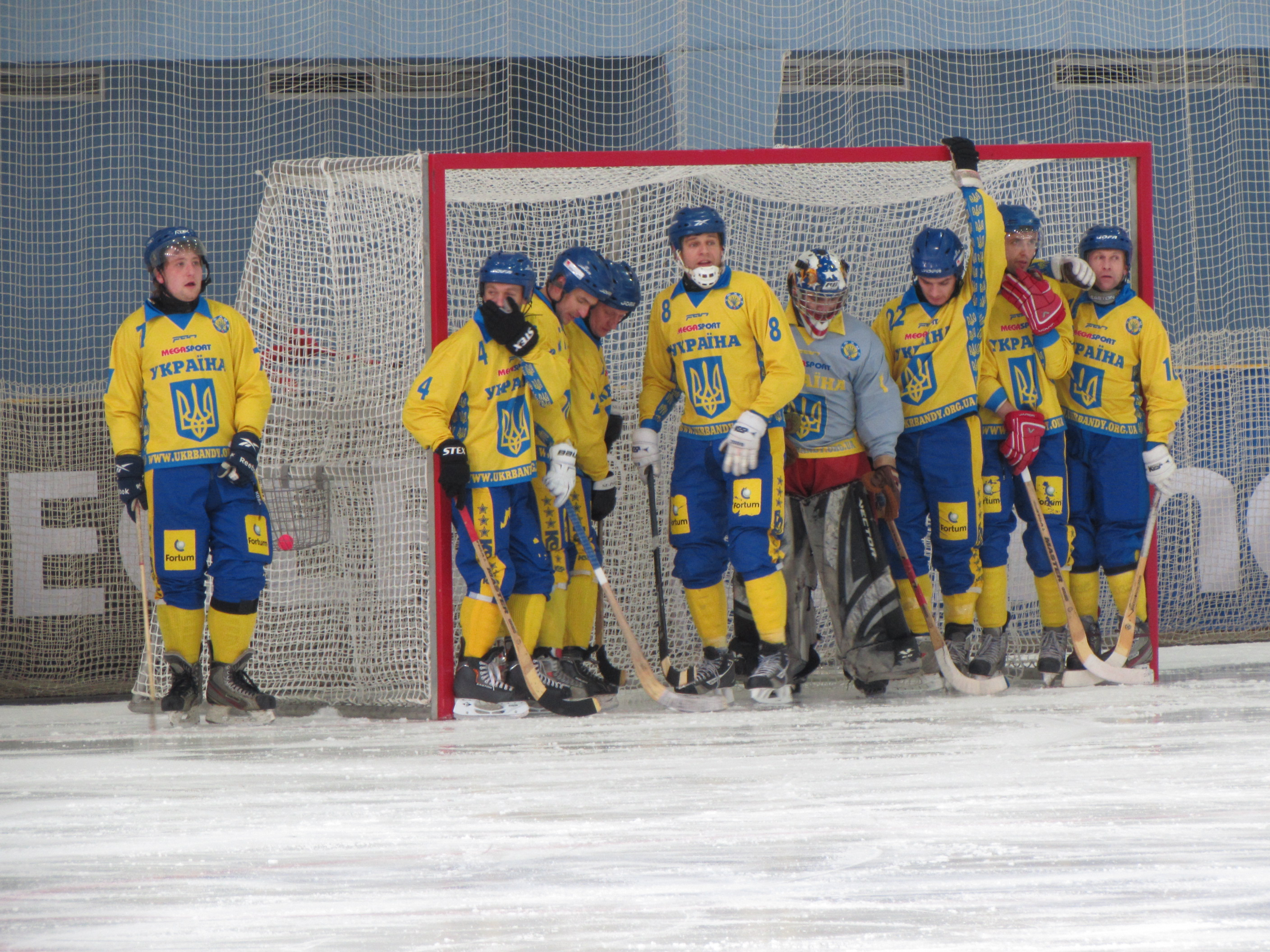
Ukraine at the 2016 World Championship

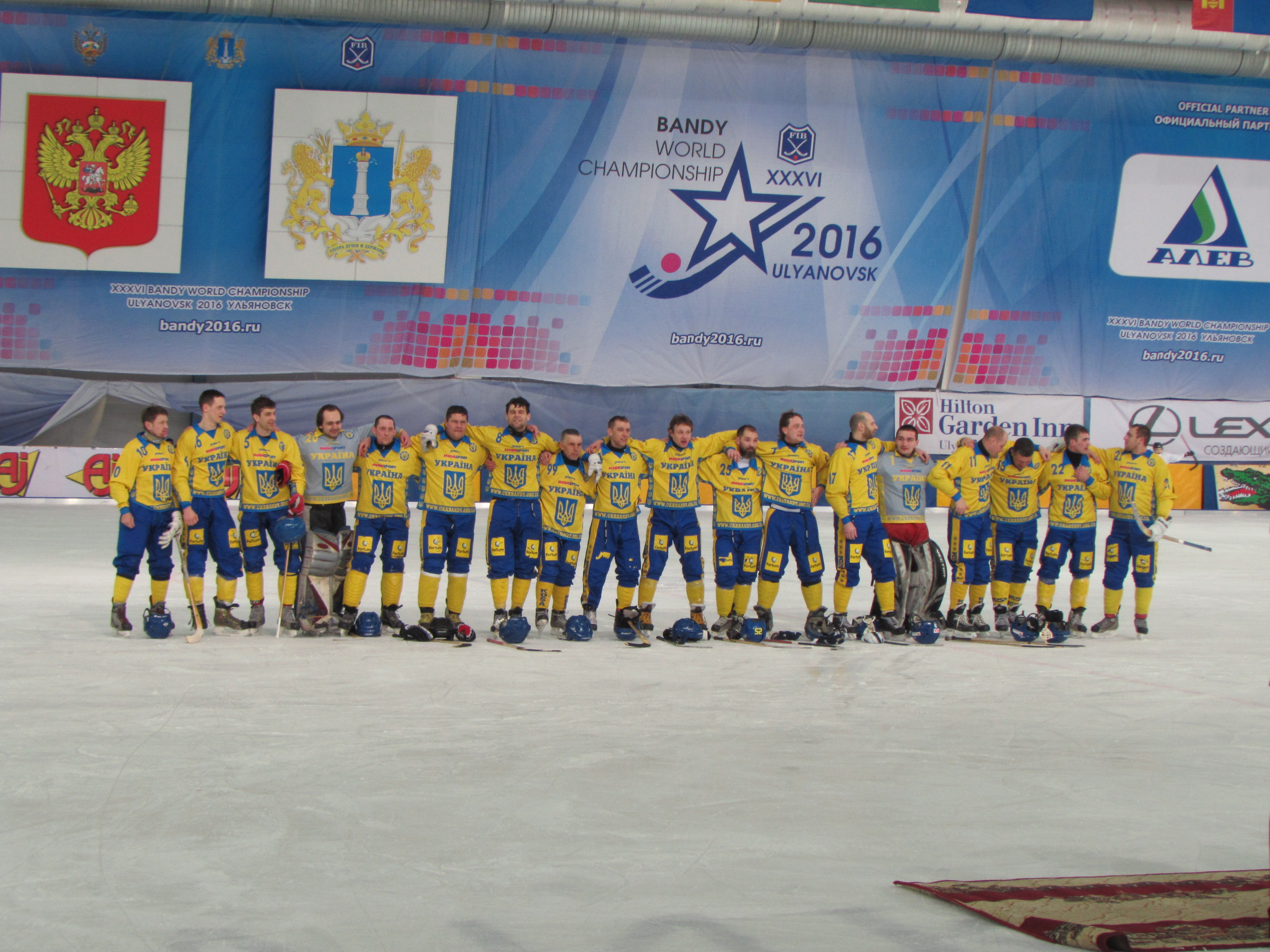
Ukraine at the 2016 World Championship
