= Czech Republic national bandy team =

Czech Republic national bandy team is competing for the Czech Republic in the international bandy and rink bandy tournaments. It is run by the Czech Association of Bandy.

== History ==
Bohemia, then a part of Austria-Hungary, was in its own right an early member of the Ligue International de Hockey sur Glace, which administered ice hockey and bandy in the years before the First World War.

The Czech Association of Bandy was founded in 2013 and became a member of the Federation of International Bandy in 2014.

On 6 January 2014 the Czech Republic participated in a four nation tournament in Davos, a centenary celebration of the European Championship of 1913. The other teams were the Netherlands, Hungary, and Germany.

19 September 2015 the team took part in a rink bandy tournament in Nymburk.

The country made the World Championship debut in the 2016 tournament.
