= Sergey Myaus =

Russian bandy player, manager and executive

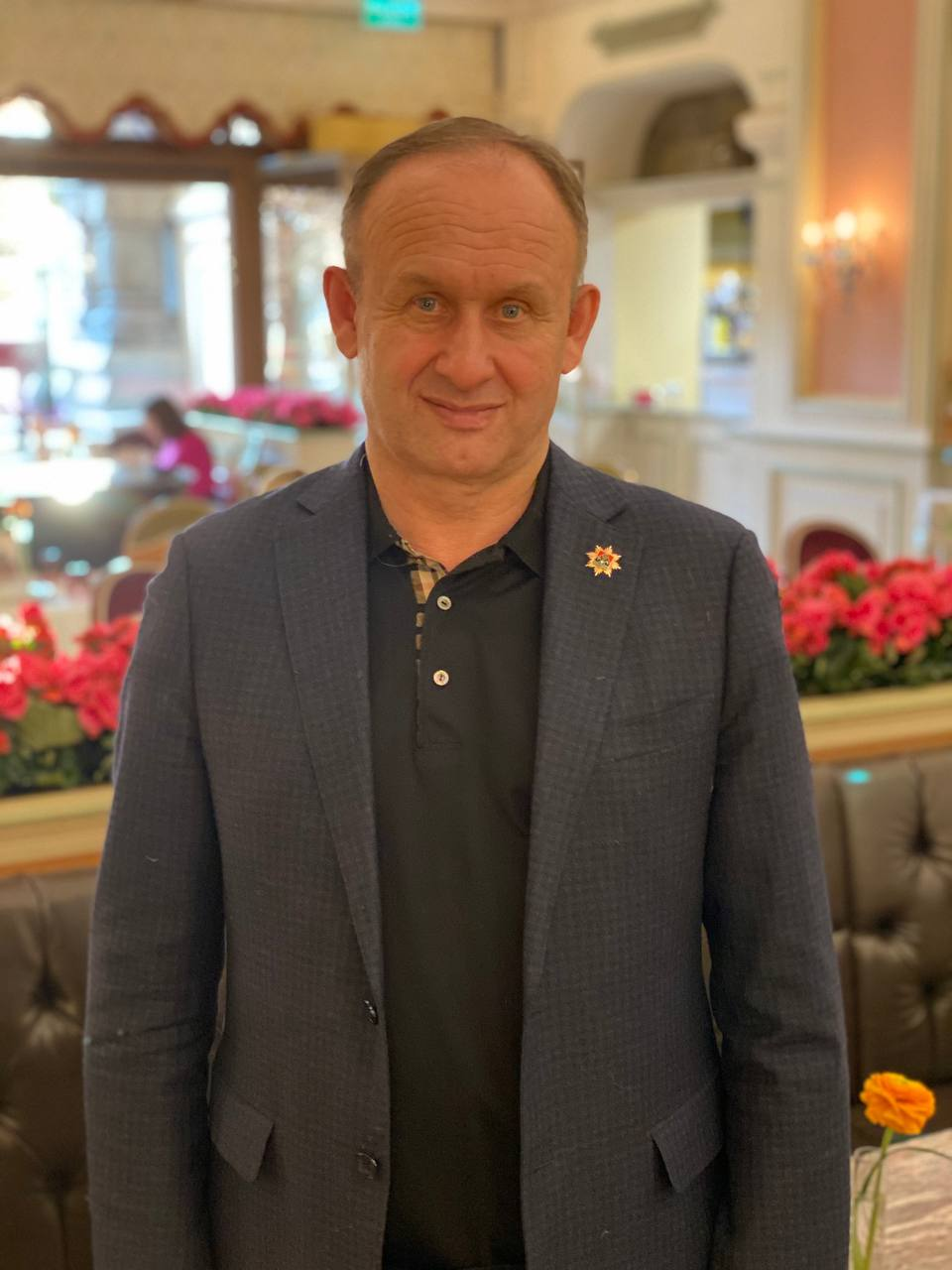

Personal information
- Full name: Sergey Anatolyevich Myaus
- Date of birth: 4 February 1959 (age 66)
- Place of birth: Kemerovo, Soviet Union

Senior career*
Years	Team	Apps^{†}	(Gls)^{†}
1978–1993	Kuzbass Kemerovo		
- * Senior club appearances and goals counted for the domestic league only. † Appearances (Goals).

Sergey Anatolyevich Myaus (Russian: Сергей Анатольевич Мяус; born 4 February 1959 in Kemerovo) is a Russian bandy manager and executive and former bandy player. He is a vice president of the Russian Bandy Federation (Федерация хоккея с мячом России), member of the FIB technical committee and a former head coach of the national bandy team.

He was a part of the delegation to China in September 2017 and the FIB representative at the second China-Russia University Winter Sports Carnival in Harbin in December same year.

Myaus played bandy in Kuzbass Kemerovo in 1978—1993.
