= Australian Bandy League =

- Sport: Bandy
- Jurisdiction: Australia
- Abbreviation: ABL
- Affiliation: Federation of International Bandy
- Headquarters: Sunbury, Victoria
- President: Adam O'Rourke
- (Australia)

Australian Bandy League was the governing body of the sport of bandy in Australia and was a member of the Federation of International Bandy. The league had its office in Victoria.

An Australian team was officially scheduled to appear at the Bandy World Championship in Khabarovsk, but never came
