= Boris Skrynnik =

Russian bandy player and executive (1948–2025)

Personal information
- Full name: Boris Ivanovich Skrynnik
- Born: 15 July 1948 Arkhangelsk, Russian SFSR, USSR
- Died: 11 December 2025 (aged 77)

Senior career*
Years	Team	Apps^{†}	(Gls)^{†}
1967–1979	Vodnik		
- * Senior club appearances and goals counted for the domestic league only. † Appearances (Goals).

Boris Ivanovich Skrynnik (Russian: Борис Иванович Скрынник; 15 July 1948 – 11 December 2025) was a Russian bandy executive and onetime bandy player. He was president of the Federation of International Bandy. He was also president of the Russian Bandy Federation (Федерация хоккея с мячом России).

== Life and career ==
Skrynnik was born in the Soviet Union on 15 July 1948. After the 2022 Russian invasion of Ukraine, Skrynnik first said he would continue to lead the Federation of International Bandy, saying: "I'm not going to suspend my Presidency. If someone wants, let them gather a quorum, and I'll suspend it." However, at the FIB annual congress in October 2022, he had changed his mind and voluntarily stepped down. He was succeeded by Stein Pedersen from Norway.

Skrynnik died on 11 December 2025, at the age of 77.

Preceded by Albert Pomortsev	President of Federation of International Bandy; 2005–2022	Succeeded by Stein Pedersen
