= Colombia Federation of Skating Sports =

Colombian sports governing body

Colombia Federation of Skating Sports (Spanish: Federación Colombiana de Patinaje) is the sports governing body of bandy, figure skating, ice hockey, speed skating and short track in Colombia. The federation is a member of the Federation of International Bandy, the International Skating Union and the International Ice Hockey Federation.
