= Russian Bandy Federation =

Sports governing body organizing bandy in Russia

- Федерация хоккея с мячом России
- Formation: 1898/1992
- Type: Governing body
- Purpose: Governing body for the sport of bandy
- Location: Moscow, Russia
- Region served: Russian Federation
- Members: Federation of International Bandy (1955/1992)
- President: Oleg Deripaska
- Website: rusbandy.ru

The Russian Bandy Federation (Russian: Федерация хоккея с мячом России, ФХМР (FKhMR)), formerly All-Russian Bandy Federation (Всероссийская федерация хоккея с мячом) is the governing body for bandy in the Russian Federation. It was founded in 1992 when it replaced the old Soviet federation (Bandy and Field Hockey Federation of the USSR) as a member of the Federation of International Bandy (FIB).

== History ==
The Soviet Union was dissolved in December 1991, in the middle of the bandy season. This led the Soviet national teams to initially be rebranded as CIS in January and February 1992. A new Russian national team was also set up and at the Russian Government Cup 1992 both teams played.

The Federation banned coach Igor Gapanovich of Vodnik Arkhangelsk and coach Evgeny Erakhtin of Baykal-Energiya each for 30 months in March 2017, and fined each club 300,000 rubles (£4,100/$5,100/€4,800) for the teams scoring an aggregate of 20 goals in their own nets rather than their opponent’s to ensure they played against a convenient team in upcoming play-offs.

== Structure ==
The Russian Bandy Federation is headquartered in Moscow. President since 2009 is Boris Skrynnik, who was also the president of FIB between 2005 and 2022. The federation has four vice presidents, one of whom is former pro-boxer Nikolai Valuev, who is also the general manager of the Russia national bandy team; another vice president is Sergey Myaus, head coach of the national bandy team.

The federation is governing the national leagues in Russia, which is set up in a top-tier Russian Bandy Super League and second tier leagues, as well as the Russian Cup. The Russian Bandy Super League is fully professional and the winning team each year is crowned Russian champions.

== Presidents ==
- 1992-2009 - Albert Pomortsev
- 2009-present - Boris Skrynnik

== See also ==
- Russia women's national bandy team
