= Albert Pomortsev =

Albert Ivanovich Pomortsev (Russian: Альберт Иванович Поморцев); born in September 25, 1939, is a Russian bandy executive. He was the president of the Federation of International Bandy in 1997-2005. When he left the presidency, vice president Seppo Vaihela took over as acting president for a while before Boris Skrynnik was elected as his successor.

Pomortsev was also the president of the Russian Bandy Federation (Федерация хоккея с мячом России) in 1992-2009.

Preceded by (Sweden) Staffan Söderlund	President of Federation of International Bandy; 1997–2005	Succeeded by (Russia) Boris Skrynnik
