= Italian Bandy Federation =

Sports governing body in Italy

- Sport: bandy, rink bandy
- Founded: 2003
- Affiliation: FIB
- Affiliation date: 26 October 2003

Italian Bandy Federation (Italian: Federazione Italiana Bandy) was a governing body for bandy and rink bandy in Italy. It had its headquarters in Milan.

The Federation was founded in 2003 and became a member of the Federation of International Bandy (FIB) on 26 October the same year. One of the driving forces behind the reintroduction of bandy in Italy was former AC Milan footballer Nils Liedholm, who became an honorary chairman of the federation. As of 2017, the federation is defunct and is not listed as a member of FIB anymore.
