= Bandy Federation of Denmark =

The Bandy Federation of Denmark (Danish: Dansk Bandy Forbund) was created in 2014 by two Danish brothers living in Sweden and playing bandy in Swedish clubs, Ole Gyldenlöve and Christian Gyldenlöve. It became a member of the Federation of International Bandy the same year. They hoped to be able to set up a Danish national team for the World Championship. However, this did not come true and the federation did not last. In 2017, it has been removed from the FIB member list.

== History of bandy in Denmark ==
Bandy has been played in Denmark before. The national federation Dansk Bandy Union was founded in 1909. A Danish national team took part in the bandy competition at the Nordic Games in 1917 and was also invited to the Nordic Games in 1922, when they however declined to participate. Due to bad (warm) winter weather in Denmark during the following years, the Danish interest for the sport died out and the then federation was discontinued.
