= Federation of International Bandy =

International sports governing body organizing bandy and rink bandy

- Formation: 12 February 1955
- Type: Sports federation
- Headquarters: Simrishamn Municipality, Sweden
- Members: 28 members
- Official language: English; Swedish; Russian
- President: Stein Pedersen
- Website: worldbandy.com

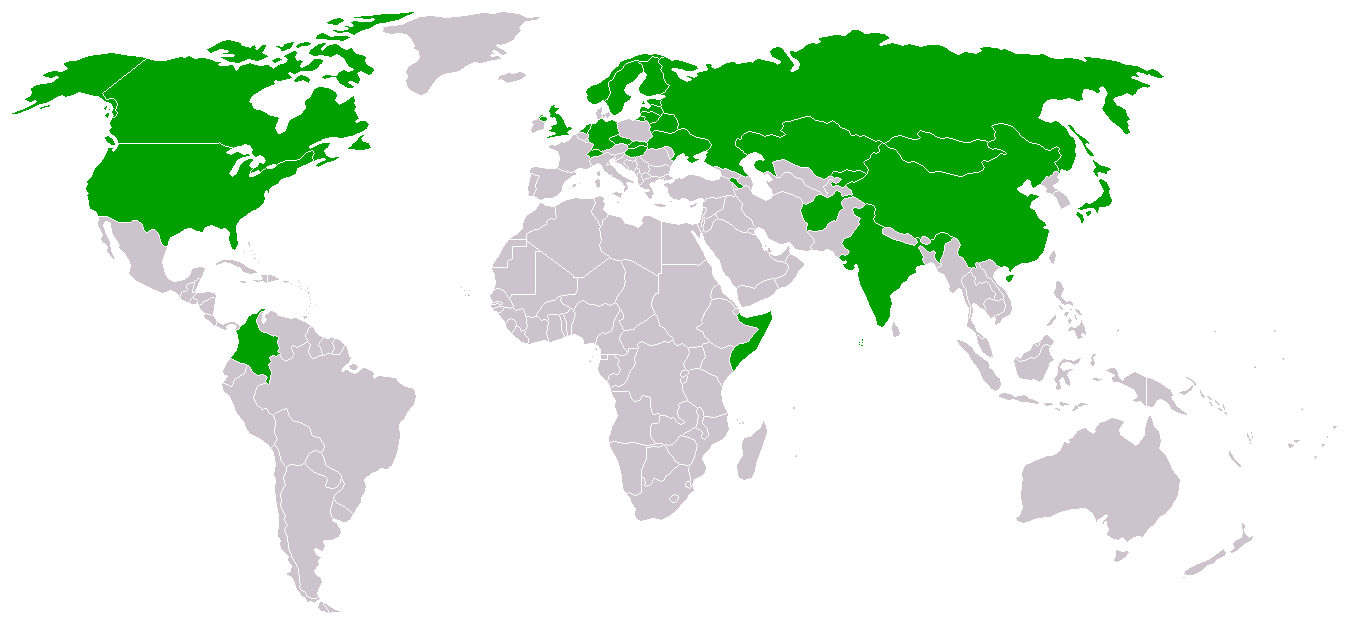
World map showing the present members of FIB (green)

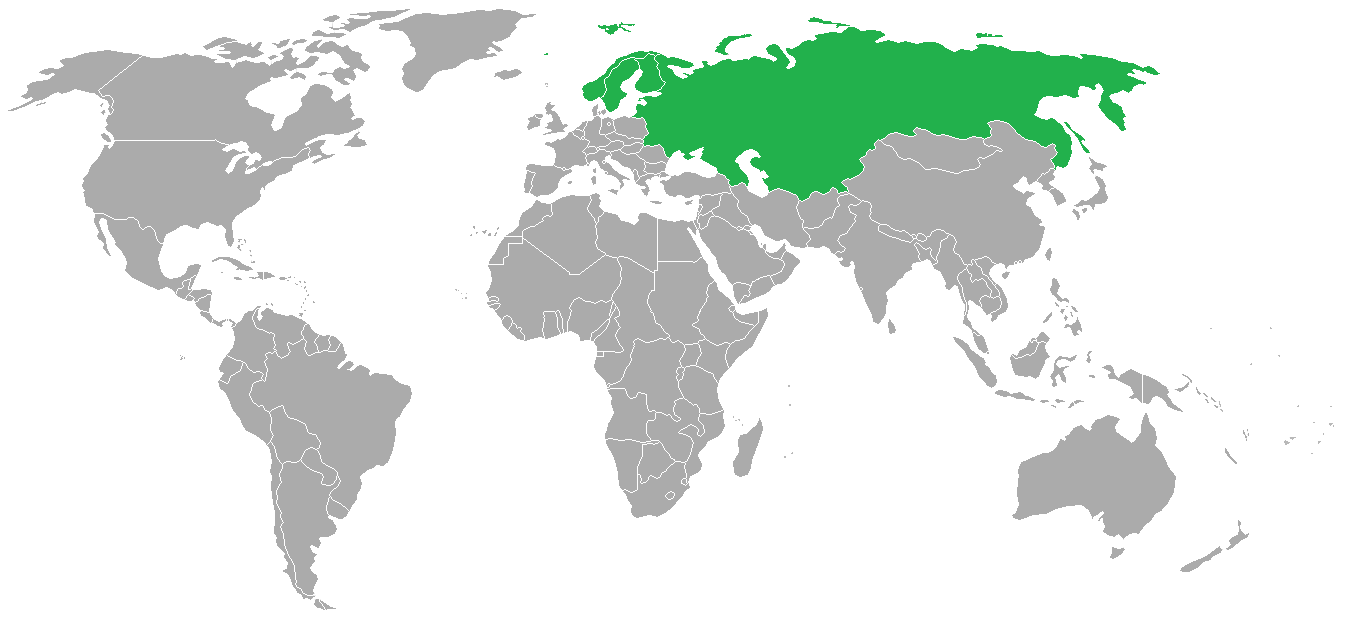
World map showing the 4 original members of FIB (green)

The Federation of International Bandy (FIB; French: Fédération internationale de bandy, Russian: Международная федерация хоккея с мячом, Swedish: Internationella Bandyförbundet) is the international governing body for the sport of bandy, including the varietys called rink bandy and short bandy. The latter was invented in 2021 and became an official discipline in 2026. The federation is headquartered in Östra Tommarp, Simrishamn Municipality, Sweden.

== History ==
Bandy as known today has been played since the later half of the 19th century. Rules were set up in the 1890s by the National Bandy Association in England and by the corresponding body in Russia. The Ligue International de Hockey sur Glace (LIHG) was founded on 15 May 1908 at 34 Rue de Provence in Paris, France, at a time when bandy and ice hockey were seen as variants of the same game. The founders of the federation were representatives from Belgium, France, Great Britain, Switzerland and Bohemia (now Czech republic). However, as ice hockey became an Olympic sport while bandy did not, bandy only survived in some of the Nordic countries and the Soviet Union. LIHG is now the International Ice Hockey Federation.

In the 1940s, the Nordic countries Finland, Norway and Sweden set up a joint rules committee. In the early 1950s, the Soviet Union decided to break out of its isolation in international sport and started a friendly exchange with said Nordic countries.

The federation was formed on 12 February 1955 at Hotell Malmen in Stockholm, Sweden, by representatives from Finland, Norway, the Soviet Union and Sweden. The federation has had its base in Sweden since 1979. Henrik Nilsson is the current President of the FIB.

When FIB was formed in 1955, it introduced the same rules for bandy all over the world. In Russia and other Soviet Republics, compared to in the Nordic countries, different rules had been used prior to this. From the Nordic rules, the weight of the ball, the shape of the stick and goalcage, the ban on playing with the feet, as well as the goalkeeper playing without a stick, prevailed, while the 15 cm (5.9 in) high border along the sidelines, and the offside rule, were kept from the Soviet rule book.

Bandy World Championships have been organized for men since 1957 and for women since 2004.

The federation was named the International Bandy Federation (IBF) between 1957 and 2001. The current name was adopted at a request from the International Olympic Committee when the IOC made bandy a "recognized sport", since the acronym IBF at the time was already in use by the International Badminton Federation (in 2006, the International Badminton Federation changed names to Badminton World Federation and now uses the acronym BWF). In 2004, FIB was accepted by IOC.

FIB is a member of Association of IOC Recognised International Sports Federations as well as Global Association of International Sports Federations.

The number of bandy playing nations have grown considerably in the last decades. There were 27 national members of the federation as of 2017 and Slovakia applied for membership.

After the International Olympic Committee's recommendations following the 2022 Russian invasion of Ukraine, the Federation of International Bandy excluded Russia from participating in the 2022 Women's Bandy World Championship. The men's 2020 Bandy World Championship had already been postponed due to the COVID-19 pandemic and was to be held in 2022, but was finally cancelled on 1 March 2022, after Finland, Sweden, Norway, and the United States announced that they would not take part in the competition in Russia due to the Russian invasion of Ukraine.

== Purposes ==
In 2011, FIB formulated its purposes as being the following.

FIB vows to completely share the principles and articles of the Olympic Charter in its activities, including the policy with regard to anti-doping controls.

FIB wants to promote the development of the sports of bandy and rink bandy in the member countries and wants to carry on propaganda for the importance and advantages of these sports. FIB also works for bandy to become an Olympic sport.

FIB declares itself to be an "independent autonomic mainsports organization which mainly is governing bandy activities all over the world".

FIB leads and supervises bandy and rink bandy around the world. FIB also sees as its job to settle the rules for the games.

One national member association should be entrusted by FIB with arranging an official world championship. FIB means that at least four nations must participate for it to be worth an event.

FIB also wants to promote the introduction and the membership of new nations to the organisation.

== Rules of the game ==
The rules of bandy are set in the Bandy Playing Rules. It is overseen by the Rules and Referee Committee.

== Cooperation with other sport governing bodies ==
FIB has an agreement with the International Skating Union to use the same arenas. The cooperation between the two federations is increasing, since both have an interest in more indoor venues with large ice surfaces being built.

== Presidents ==
The following persons have been presidents of FIB:

- 1955–1963, Gunnar Galin, Sweden
- 1963–1967, Allan Ljungqvist, Finland
- 1967–1971, Arne Argus, Sweden
- 1971–1978, Grigory Granaturov, Soviet Union
- 1978–1983, Pontus Widén, Sweden
- 1983–1991, Grigory Granaturov, Soviet Union
- 1991–1993, Carl Fogelberg, Finland
- 1993–1997, Staffan Söderlund, Sweden
- 1997–2005, Albert Pomortsev, Russia
- 2005–2005, Seppo Vaihela (acting), Sweden
- 2005–2022, Boris Skrynnik, Russia
- 2022–2024, Stein Pedersen, Norway
- 2024-2026 Henrik Nilsson, Sweden
- 2026– Stein Pedersen, Norway

== Events ==
- Bandy World Championship Since 1957
- Women's Bandy World Championship
- Youth Bandy World Championship (one class for girls and four classes for boys and young men)
- Bandy World Cup
- Bandy World Cup Women
- Bandy World Cup Girls Y17
- European Cup
- Bandy at the Asian Winter Games
- Bandy at the 2019 Winter Universiade

== Members and years of admission ==
The federation was founded by the national bandy associations in Finland, Norway, the Soviet Union and Sweden on 12 February 1955.

The Soviet membership was taken over by Russia in early 1992, following the dissolution of the Soviet Union in December 1991. For two months, the former Soviet Union national bandy team appeared as Commonwealth of Independent States, but the CIS was never formally a member of the FIB.

The member associations are divided in geographical zones. There are 27 associations in 4 zones (as of 25 March 2022): Furthermore, on 26 September 2023, Italy was granted provisional membership.

Number	Region	Countries
1	Africa	1
2	Asia (Asian Bandy Federation)	6
3	Europe	17
4	Americas	3
Total	World	27

=== Current members ===
Association	Founded (Predecessor founded)	FIB affiliation	External link	National teams	Top division
Afghanistan		2012		Men's; U21; U19; U17; Women's; W U21; W U17	
Armenia	1999	2008			
Belarus		1999		Men's; U21; U19; U17; Women's; W U21; W U17	
Canada	1983	1983		Men's; U21; U19; U17; Women's; W U21; W U17	
China	2014 (Note: China was originally represented by the Chinese Ice Hockey Association)	2010		Men's; U21; U19; U17; Women's; W U21; W U17	
Colombia		2017			
Czech Republic	2013	2014		Men's; U21; U19; U17; Women's; W U21; W U17	
Estonia	2002	2002		Men's; U21; U19; U17; Women's; W U21; W U17	
Finland	1972 (1907)	1955		Men's; U21; U19; U17; Women's; W U21; W U17	Bandyliiga (men); Naisten Bandyliiga (women)
Germany	2013	2013		Men's; U21; U19; U17; Women's; W U21; W U17	
Great Britain (Note: Represented only England until 2017)	2010 (1891)	2010		Men's; U21; U19; U17; Women's; W U21; W U17	
Hungary		1989		Men's; U21; U19; U17; Women's; W U21; W U17	
India	2001	2002		Men's; U21; U19; U17; Women's; W U21; W U17	
Italy		2024		Men's; U21; U19; U17; Women's; W U21; W U17	
Japan	2011	2011		Men's; U21; U19; U17; Women's; W U21; W U17	
Kazakhstan		1993		Men's; U21; U19; U17; Women's; W U21; W U17	
Latvia		2006		Men's; U21; U19; U17; Women's; W U21; W U17	
Lithuania		2008			
Mongolia		2002		Men's; U21; U19; U17; Women's; W U21; W U17	
Netherlands	2012 (1971) (1898)	1973		Men's; U21; U19; U17; Women's; W U21; W U17	
Norway	1920	1955		Men's; U21; U19; U17; Women's; W U21; W U17	Premier League (men)
Russia	1992 (1898)	1992 (Note: 1955 as Soviet Union)		Men's; U21; U19; U17; Women's; W U21; W U17	Super League (men)
Slovakia		2017		Men's; U21; U19; U17; Women's; W U21; W U17	
Somalia		2013		Men's; U21; U19; U17; Women's; W U21; W U17	
Sweden	1925 (1904)	1955		Men's; U21; U19; U17; Women's; W U21; W U17	Elitserien (men); Elitserien (women)
Switzerland		2006		Men's; U21; U19; U17; Women's; W U21; W U17	
Ukraine		2008		Men's; U21; U19; U17; Women's; W U21; W U17	
United States		1981		Men's; U21; U19; U17; Women's; W U21; W U17	

=== Former members ===
- Soviet Union 1955–1991: When the international federation was founded in 1955, the Soviet Union was one of its founding members. The Soviet national federation was called the Bandy and Field Hockey Federation of the USSR (Федерация хоккея с мячом и хоккея на траве СССР). The Soviet Union had a national bandy team for men and a national bandy team for women. When the Soviet Union was dissolved in December 1991, the national team came to represent the Commonwealth of Independent States for some months. In 1992, Russia took over its place in FIB.
- West Germany/Germany 1990–1991: Before the present German Bandy Association was founded in 2013, there had been an earlier, short-lived German federation, which was a member of FIB from 29 January 1990 until March 1991, when it voluntarily choose to leave. In its short life span, it still overlived the German reunification in October 1990.
- Kyrgyzstan 2004-2018: The Bandy Federation of Kyrgyzstan became a FIB member in 2004 and the national team took part at the 2011 Asian Winter Games and at the 2012 World Championship but did not take part in any more tournaments after that. In 2018, the federation had become effectively defunct and was removed from the FIB member list.

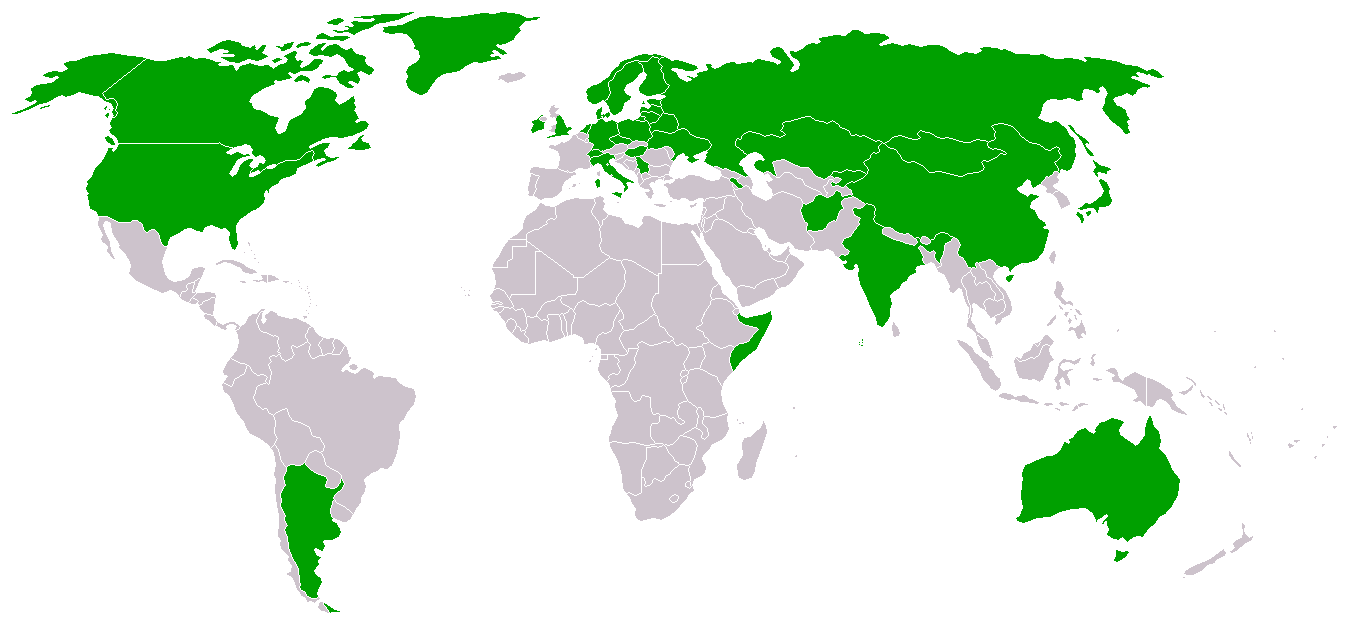
A world map showing all the member countries before the defunct associations were taken from the membership list of FIB in 2017.

- In early 2017, seven national bandy federations were removed from the member list of FIB. None of them had ever sent a team to any international competition. A number of national federations have been admitted as members during the years but then for different reasons not survived, often because of a lack of interest in the sport in their countries. These defunct national federations which were purged from the FIB member list in 2017 were:

Association	Founded	FIB affiliation	Note
Argentina	2008	2008	
Australia	2006	2006	
Denmark	2014	2014	
Ireland	2006	2006	
Italy	2003	2003	Italy has since rejoined in 2024 through a new national federation.
Poland	2005	2006	
Serbia	2006	2006	

=== Continental federations ===
Some of the Asian countries in FIB, and also the former member Kyrgyzstan, have founded the Asian Bandy Association, which has its headquarters in Astana, Kazakhstan. This helps organize the bandy competition at the Asian Winter Games and works to spread the knowledge of bandy in Asia.

Members:

1. China
2. Japan
3. Kazakhstan
4. Kyrgyzstan
5. Mongolia

== National Teams ==
=== Men ===
RANK MATCHES POINTS

1 Russia 255 4591

2 Sweden 672 4540

3 Finland 543 4293

4 Kazakhstan 161 3853

5 Norway 449 3833

6 USA 184 3278

7 Belarus 81 3127

8 Canada 102 2864

9 Denmark 2 2855

10 Netherlands 135 2748

11 Estonia 96 2641

12 Germany 47 2590

13 Hungary 142 2570

14 Great Britain 12 2507

15 Mongolia 73 2483

16 Latvia 83 2458

17 Ukraine 42 2359

18 Japan 55 2298

19 Slovakia 30 2165

20 Czechia 39 2157

21 China 34 1797

22 Switzerland 24 1761

23 Kyrgyzstan 7 1468

24 Somalia 44 927

25 Afghanistan 3 612

Ranking generated from a database of 1765 matches.

18 January, 2026.

=== Women ===
RANK MATCHES POINTS

1 Sweden 149 4530

2 Russia 85 4411

3 Norway 98 3907

4 USA 99 3707

5 Canada 61 3707

6 Finland 117 3515

7 China 10 2805

8 Great Britain 5 2715

9 Netherlands 14 2645

10 Hungary 12 2613

11 Japan 5 2612

12 Estonia 14 2386

13 Switzerland 23 1905

14 Ukraine 8 1824

15 Germany 4 1718

Ranking generated from a database of 352 matches.

18 January, 2026.

== See also ==
- Association of IOC Recognised International Sports Federations
