= Carl-Axel Acking =

Swedish architect, author and furniture designer

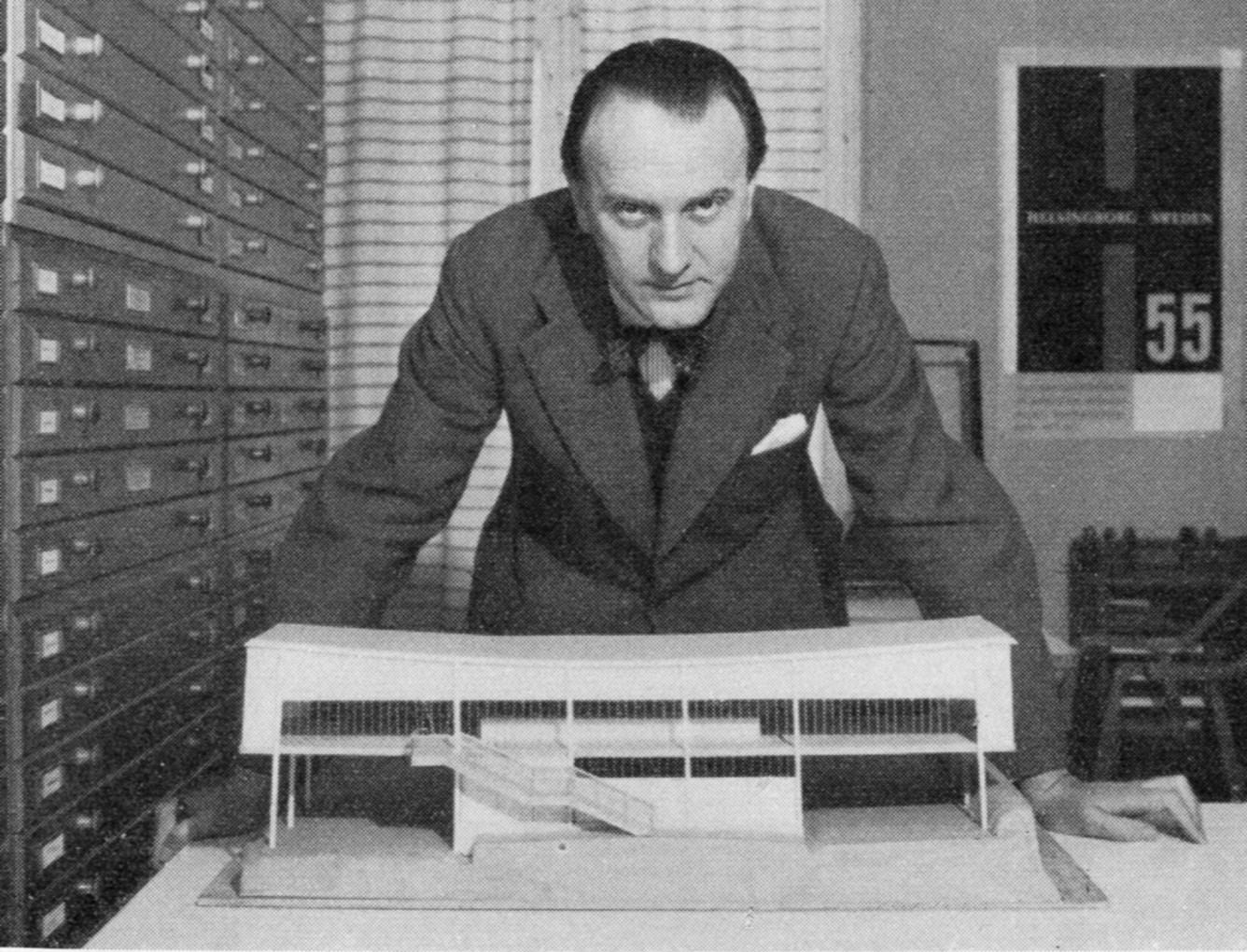
- Carl-Axel Acking with the model for the H55 exhibition pavilion
- Born: 8 March 1910; Helsingborg
- Died: 12 June 2001 (aged 91); Lund
- Resting place: Djursholms Begravningsplats
- Occupation: Architect

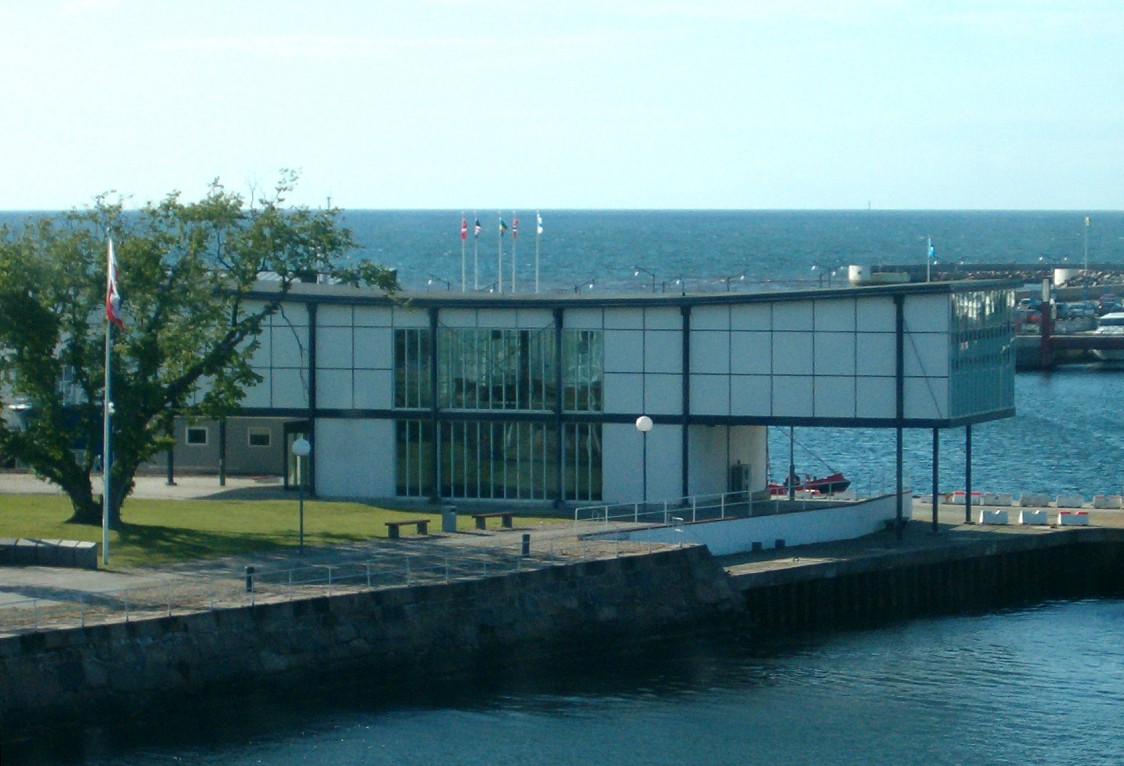
The reconstructed pavilion of H55

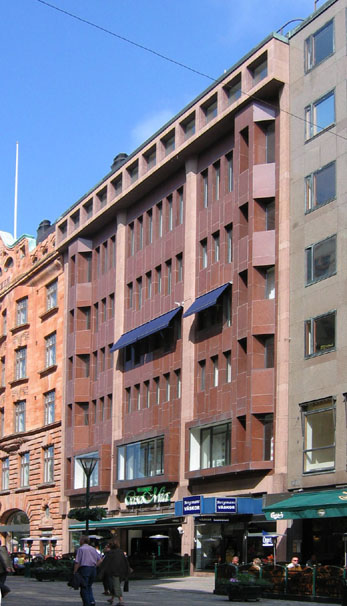
Skånska Banken on Södergatan in Malmö

Carl-Axel Acking (March 8, 1910 – June 12, 2001) was a Swedish architect, author and furniture designer, winner of the Lunning Prize in 1952.

== Notable works ==
- 1950 Siris kapell in Torsby
- 1955 Hässelby Familjehotell in Stockholm
- 1956 "Quality Hotel" Östersund
- 1965 Skånska banken och Kreditbanken på Södergatan i Malmö
- 1970 Telefonstation Bellevuegården in Malmö
- 1972 Birgittakyrkan in Skön
