= List of Cheltenham College alumni =

This is a list of former pupils of Cheltenham College.

== Nobel Prize recipient ==
- Patrick White (1912–1990) – 1973 Literature laureate

== Victoria Cross recipients ==
Fourteen Victoria Crosses (VCs) have been won by Old Cheltonians, with only Eton College (37), Harrow School (20), Haileybury College (17), and Wellington College (15), having higher totals (although the Duke of York's Royal Military School does not publish lists of recipients of bravery awards). The list of names, with age and rank at the time of the deed that merited the award of the VC, is as follows:

- Lieutenant Andrew Cathcart Bogle, 78th Regiment, Oonao, India, 29 July 1857, aged 28
- William Fraser McDonell, Bengal Civil Service, Arrah, India, 30 July 1857 aged 27
- Midshipman Duncan Gordon Boyes, HMS Euryalus, Japan, 6 September 1864, aged 17
- Captain George Nicolas Channer, 1st Gurkha Rifles, Perak Expedition, 20 December 1875, aged 32
- Lieutenant Teignmouth Melvill, 24th Regiment of Foot, Isandlwanha, Zululand, 22 January 1879, aged 36
- Lieutenant Reginald Clare Hart, Royal Engineers, Afghan War, 31 January 1879, aged 30
- Lieutenant John Duncan Grant, 8th Gurkha Rifles, Gyantse Jong, Tibet Expedition, 6 July 1904 aged 27
- Captain Douglas Reynolds, Royal Field Artillery, Le Cateau, France, 26 August 1914, aged 31
- Lieutenant Philip Neame, Royal Engineers, Neuve Chapelle, France, aged 26
- Lieut. Commander Edward Courtney Boyle, Submarine E14, Sea of Marmara, Dardanelles, 27 April 1915, aged 32
- Second Lieut. George Raymond Dallas Moor, Hampshire Regiment, Krithia, Dardanelles, 5 June 1915, aged 18
- Lieutenant Colonel James Forbes-Robertson (34)
- Sergeant Frederick Charles Booth, 1st Rhodesian Native Regiment, Johannes Bruck, East Africa, 12 February 1917, aged 26
- Commander Robert Edward Dudley Ryder, RN, St Nazaire, 27 March 1942, aged 34

== George Cross recipient ==
- André Gilbert Kempster (né Coccioletti). Royal Armoured Corps; Algeria, 21 August 1943

== Sport ==
- Nick Abendanon (1986–) – England international rugby player
- Michael Baines (1898–1990) – First-class cricketer and British Army officer
- Henry Baird (1878–1950)– First-class cricketer and British Army officer
- Jonah Barrington (1941-) - 6 times British Open Squash Champion
- Tom Beim (1975–)– England rugby international
- Francis Brandt (1840–1925) – First-class cricketer
- Thomas Bramwell (1850–1924) – First-class cricketer
- James Brettell (1962–) – First-class cricketer
- George Brooksbank (1981–) – Sportsperson
- Jamie Chadwick (1998–) – Racing driver
- Neville Cohen (1913–1987) – First-class cricketer
- Simon Danielli (born 1979-) – Scottish rugby player
- Desmond Eagar (1917–1977) – First-class cricketer and cricket administrator
- Charles Garnett (1840–1919) – First-class cricketer
- Leslie Hancock (1899–1944) – First-class cricketer
- Allan Heath (1865–1913) – First-class cricketer
- Allan Jay MBE (born 1931) – five-time-Olympian foil and épée fencer, and world champion
- Walter Kempster (1909–1952) – First-class cricketer
- George Kennedy (1841–1869) – First-class cricketer
- Frank Kershaw (1879–1959) – First-class cricketer
- Reginald le Bas (1856–1938) – First-class cricketer
- Tom McEwan (1991-) – Olympic Silver and Team Gold Medalist Equestrian
- Clive Roberts (1912–1962) – First-class cricketer
- James Robertson (1844–1877) – First-class cricketer
- Chris Sandbach (born 1985—), cricketer
- Percival Sanger (1899–1968) – First-class cricketer and an officer in both the British Army and the British Indian Army
- James Stout – Rackets World Champion
- Richard Taite (1911–1969) – First-class cricketer
- Hugh Thompson (1934–2021) – First-class cricketer
- Ollie Thorley (born 1996-) - Gloucester Rugby player
- Arthur Tyler (1907–1985) – First-class cricketer and British Army officer
- Geoffrey Wood (1891–1915) – cricketer
- Seb Blake (2001-) - Gloucester Rugby player

== Notable former pupils in other fields ==
- Lieut.-Col. J. D. H. Stewart (1845–1884) – killed leading the last Europeans out of Khartoum when their steamer ran aground
- Sir Brian Egerton KCIE (1857–1940), tutor of Indian princes.
- Colonel Richard S. Hawks Moody (1854 - 1930) – distinguished British Army officer, and historian
- Major Anthony Gilchrist McCall (1895-1978) - Superintendent of the Lushai Hills 1941-1943
- Major-General Sir Colin Gubbins (1896–1976) – prime mover of the Special Operations Executive in the Second World War
- Lindsay Anderson (1923–1994) – film director
- Brigadier Charles Douglas Armstrong (1897–1985) – Head of the British Special Operations Executive liaison mission to the Chetniks in Yugoslavia, 1943-44
- Tim Bevan (1957–) – co-founder of Working Title Films
- Forde Everard de Wend Cayley (1915–2004) – MD, RAMC, MBE, FRCP, World War II POW camp survivor
- Houston Stewart Chamberlain, antisemitic writer
- Jack Davenport (born 1973), film and television actor
- Sir Charles Eliot (1862–1931) – former British ambassador to Japan and the inaugural Vice-Chancellor of the University of Hong Kong
- Lieutenant General Sir John Fowler (1864–1939) – Commander of British Forces in China, 1922–1925
- Sir Wyndham Charles Knight (1863–1942), Indian Army general
- The Baron Haselhurst (1937–) – former Deputy Speaker & MP, current Conservative Peer in House of Lords
- Adam Henson (1966–) – farmer and TV presenter
- Chris Hill (born 1971), businessman, CEO of Hargreaves Lansdown
- Hichamuddin Hussein (1961–) – Malaysian politician
- Sir Lawrence H. Jenkins (1857–1928) – Chief Justice of Calcutta High Court and Bombay High Court.
- Gavin Lambert (1924–2005), screenwriter, novelist and biographer
- Lieutenant Commander Mike Lithgow (1920–1963) – test pilot and holder of absolute World Speed Record 1953
- Wing Commander Desmond McMullen (1917–1985), a flying ace with the Royal Air Force during the Second World War
- Kenneth Mason (1887–1976), Himalayan explorer and first statutory Professor of Geography at Oxford University
- Wing Commander Richard Milne (1919–2004), a flying ace with the Royal Air Force during the Second World War
- The Baron Moore of Wolvercote (1921–2009), Private Secretary to Queen Elizabeth II from 1977 to 1986.
- Rageh Omaar (born 1967), ITV News correspondent and presenter, formerly with BBC News and Al Jazeera English
- Endicott Peabody (1857–1944) – American clergyman and founder of Groton School
- Alfred Pullman (1916–1954) – RAF Officer killed in Mau Mau Uprising
- The Baron Richard (1932–2018), former Labour Cabinet minister, British Ambassador to the United Nations and Shadow Leader of the House of Lords.
- General Sir Mike Rose (1940-), Commander UNPROFOR Bosnia in 1994 during the Yugoslav Wars.
- W. H. D. Rouse (1863–1950) – British teacher who advocated the use of the Direct Method of teaching Latin and Greek
- Iain Sinclair (born 1943), poet, novelist, editor, filmmaker, publisher, playwright and book-dealer
- Mark Stone (born 1979) - Journalist / Foreign Correspondent
- Sirichalerm Svasti or Chef McDang (born 1953–) – celebrity chef
- Hugh Verity (1918–2001) – RAF pilot, veteran of many night landings in wartime France for the SOE
- Prince Vivadhanajaya (1899–1960) – First Governor of the Bank of Thailand and Finance minister of Thailand
- Ts'o Seen Wan (1868–1953) — Founder of St Stephen's College, Hong Kong
- Edward Wilson (1872–1912), physician, polar explorer, natural historian, painter and ornithologist
- Ken Yeang (1948—) – Architect
- Hishammuddin Hussein (1961-), Member of Parliament (UMNO) for Sembrong since 2004
- Sir Chris Bryant (1962-) Member of Parliament (Labour) for Rhondda since 2001
- Martin Horwood (1962-), former Member of Parliament (Liberal Democrat) for Cheltenham from 2005 to 2015

== See also ==
- People educated at Cheltenham College, for the larger category list
