= Cheltonian =

Cheltonian may refer to:

- A native of the town of Cheltenham, England
- Old Cheltonian, a former pupil of Cheltenham College
- Cheltonian Society, an organisation for Old Cheltonians

== See also ==
- List of people from Cheltenham
- Category:People from Cheltenham
