= Olof Faxander =

President and Chief Executive Officer - Sandvik AB

- Born: 19 May 1970; New Jersey
- Alma mater: KTH Royal Institute of Technology
- Position held: chief executive officer (2011–2015), chief executive officer (2006–2011)

Olof Bertil Faxander, born 19 May 1970 in New Jersey, USA, and grew up in Stockholm Sweden, is an international businessman.

== Biography ==
Faxander graduated from the Royal Institute of Technology with a master's degree in Materials Science in 1996. He also holds a business degree from Stockholm University. Faxander has held leading positions at Outokumpu, AvestaPolarit and Avesta Sheffield.

During the years 2006 to 2011 was the CEO of the Swedish specialty steel company SSAB. During Faxander's time as CEO the company expanded heavily and acquired the Canadian steel company IPSCO which transformed the company from being a local Swedish steel producer into a global player in the specialty steel sector.

In 2011 Faxander was appointed CEO of the Industrial group Sandvik. His years at Sandvik were characterised by a significant development and modernisation work. Faxander was succeeded by Björn Rosengren in 2015.

Nordic Capital recruited Faxander in January 2016, where he currently works as an Operating Partner with responsibility to drive development in the portfolio companies during the ownership period.

In 2010 Faxander was named Leader of the Year by Swedish business weekly Affärsvärlden based on his achievements as CEO of SSAB. Faxander has also been recognised for his leadership skills by a high ranking in leadership magazine Chef's leader review.

In 2012 Faxander as Chairman of the Board lead the merger of four Swedish employer federations into one, Industriarbetsgivarna, and acted as Chairman during the subsequent national collective bargaining process in 2012.
