= Qred =

Swedish digital bank

Qred Bank AB is a Swedish digital bank specializing in financing products for small and medium-sized enterprises (SMEs). Founded in 2015 and headquartered in Stockholm, the company initially operated as a fintech lender before receiving a Swedish banking license in 2023. Qred Bank provides business loans, business credit cards, and savings accounts, and operates in several European markets.

== History ==
Qred was founded in Stockholm in 2015. It became subject to Swedish banking regulation and supervision by the Swedish Financial Supervisory Authority. The company's board has been chaired by Mattias Carlsson since 2023, while co-founder Emil Sunvisson serves as chief executive officer.

During its early years, Qred expanded beyond Sweden into several European markets, including Finland, Denmark, the Netherlands, Belgium, Germany, and Norway. The company also established operations in Brazil through a joint venture.

In 2021, Nordic Capital invested in the company to support its international expansion and product development.

In May 2023, the Swedish Financial Supervisory Authority granted Qred a banking license, allowing the company to operate as Qred Bank AB and expand banking services across the European Union.

Qred has appeared multiple times in the Financial Times FT1000 ranking of Europe's fastest-growing companies. The company has also received the Nordic Scaleup Award, recognizing high-growth Nordic businesses.

== Partnerships/Acquisitions ==
In 2024, cspaar partnered with Qred to provide Danish SMEs with easier access to business financing.

In 2025, Qred Bank partnered with Enable Banking to integrate open banking technology into its lending platform.

In 2026, Qred merged with Liberis. Verdane announced an investment in Qred as part of its combination with Liberis.

== See also ==
- Nordic Capital
- Swedish Financial Supervisory Authority
