= Bristol City Stadium =

Unbuilt stadium in Bristol, England

- Ashton Vale
- Artist's impression of the proposed stadium
- Interactive map of Bristol City Stadium
- Coordinates: 51.4358°N 2.6293°W
- Owner: Bristol City F.C.
- Operator: Bristol City F.C.
- Capacity: 30,000 (option to increase to 42,000).
- Surface: Grass

Construction
- Cost: £29,000,000
- Architect: Hellmuth, Obata and Kassabaum

The Bristol City Stadium (tentative name) was a proposed football stadium, announced in November 2007, which would be built on land at Ashton Vale, Bristol, England, and would replace Ashton Gate as the home stadium of Bristol City F.C. After facing local opposition the club cancelled the project, instead deciding to renovate Ashton Gate.

== Design ==
The stadium was intended to have a capacity of 30,000 spectators. HOK, the architects that designed Wembley Stadium, Cardiff's Millennium Stadium and Arsenal F.C.'s Emirates Stadium, were retained to design the stadium. As a preliminary part of the planning process, public consultations took place in December 2008 and February 2009.

A survey carried out by Bristol City Supporters Trust reported that 95% of fans supported the move to a new stadium, but that there were concerns about the acoustics of the new stadium and the need for it to have a distinctive "Bristol" feel. In December 2009, the Football Association announced that Bristol would be one of the host cities should England win the 2018 World Cup bid. The bid, however, was unsuccessful.

== Financing ==
In April 2009, Bristol City owner and chairman Steve Lansdown sold a stake of 4.7% in Hargreaves Lansdown for a sum of £47.2million, towards the cost of building the stadium, reducing his stake in the business to 22.9%. Lansdown commented that the rest of the costs of construction would be paid for by a combination of the sale of Ashton Gate, debentures, and the naming rights for the new stadium.

== Name ==
Tentatively named the Bristol City Stadium, it was also referred to as Ashton Vale, the name of the area in which it was planned to be built. Lansdown commented that he would not follow Dave Whelan, JJB Sports founder and Wigan Athletic owner, in naming the stadium after his business, Hargreaves Lansdown. He said "I don’t want my name near the stadium. It’ll be more like Emirates Stadium."

== Planning history ==
With Bristol City and Bristol Rovers both wanting bigger capacities by the turn of the 21st century, the city council had been exploring the possibility of building a new stadium for both of the city's football teams, as well as its rugby team. The plans were cancelled and Rovers later withdrew their interest in relocating to a new site, instead concentrating on plans to expand the Memorial Stadium, which they had shared with the rugby team since 1996.

Planning approval was granted by Bristol City Council in October 2009 but faced opposition from residents, who attempted to have the 45-acre (18 ha) site – a former landfill area – designated as a town green. The council agreed to this status for the southern half, while backing the building of the stadium on the northern half. In June 2012, the disagreement almost escalated to a judicial review. In 2013, Bristol City F.C. obtained approval for enlargement and partial redevelopment of their Ashton Gate stadium instead.

== See also ==
- Development of stadiums in English football
