= David Brettell =

English-born Hong Kong cricketer

Personal information
- Full name: David Norman Brettell
- Born: 10 March 1956 (age 70); Woking, Surrey, England
- Batting: Left-handed
- Bowling: Left-arm orthodox
- Relatives: James Brettell (brother)

International information
- National side: Hong Kong (1990)

Domestic team information
- Years: Team
- 1975–1978: Oxford University
- Source: CricketArchive, 10 March 2016

David Norman Brettell (born 10 March 1956) is a former international cricketer who represented the Hong Kong national side at the 1990 ICC Trophy. He also played first-class cricket for Oxford University in the late 1970s.

Born in Woking, Surrey, Brettell attended Cheltenham College before going on to Trinity College, Oxford. A left-arm orthodox bowler, he made his first-class debut for Oxford in May 1975, against Somerset, and over the following four years played a total of thirteen first-class matches. He took 18 wickets, with his best figures being 3/22 against Somerset in April 1978.

A solicitor by trade, Brettell relocated to Hong Kong for work reasons in 1986. After several years of club cricket with the Kowloon Cricket Club, he was called up to Hong Kong's squad for the 1990 ICC Trophy in the Netherlands (the qualification tournament for the 1992 World Cup). At the tournament, Brettell played in only three of Hong Kong's seven matches, but took eight wickets, the third-most for his team. His best figures, 4/53, came against Israel, while he also took 3/33 against East and Central Africa. Brettell was originally also named in the squad for the 1994 ICC Trophy, but had to withdraw due to work commitments.
