= Sandvik Coromant =

Swedish cutting tools manufacturer

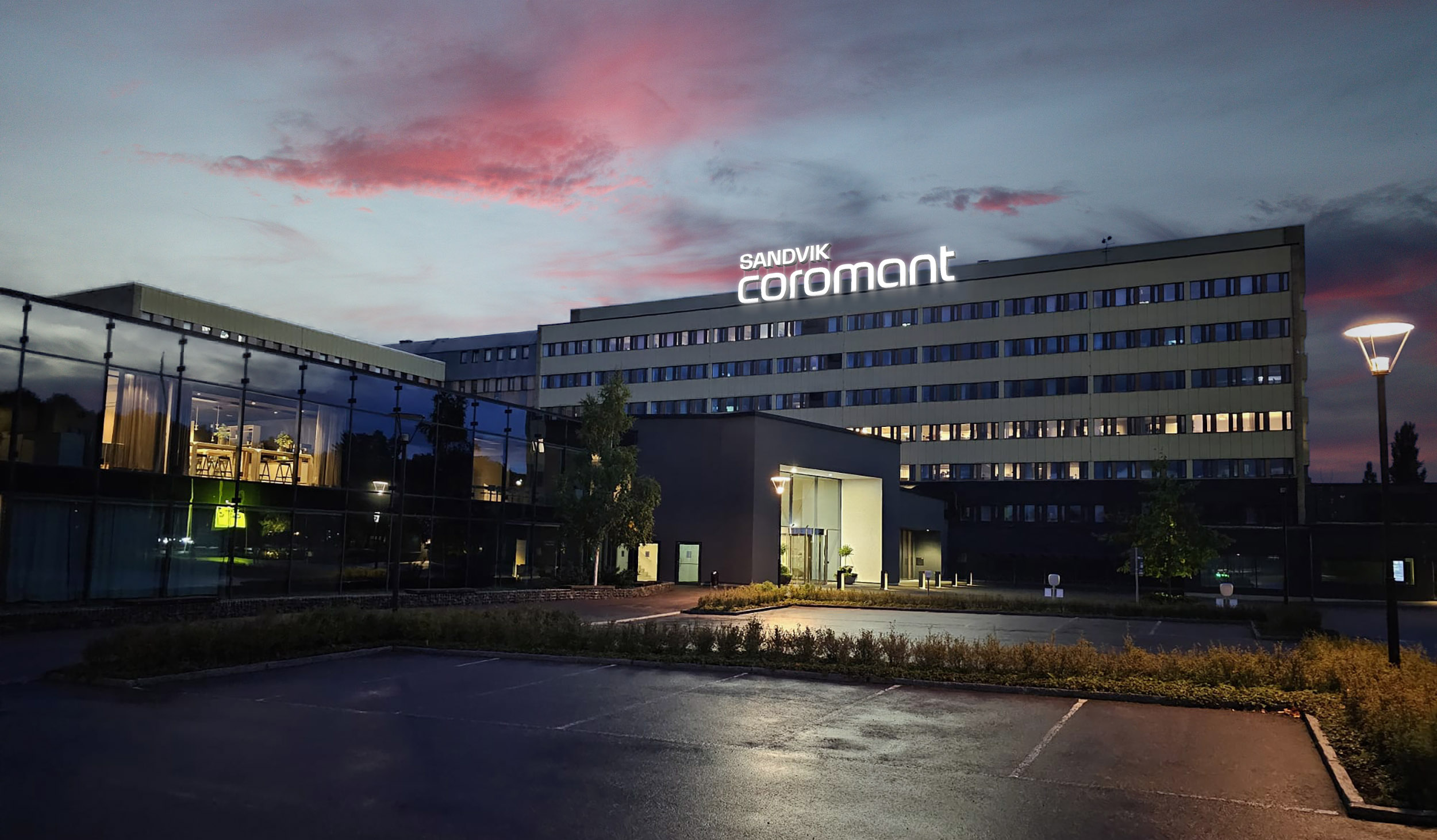
- Type: Private company
- ISIN: 556234-6865
- Industry: Metalworking
- Founder: Wilhelm Haglund
- Headquarters: Sandviken, Sweden
- Key people: Helen Blomqvist, CEO
- Products: Metal cutting tools for turning, milling, drilling, boring, tool holding systems, and digital machining.
- Number of employees: 7900 (2019)
- Parent: Sandvik AB
- Website: www.sandvik.coromant.com/en/gimo

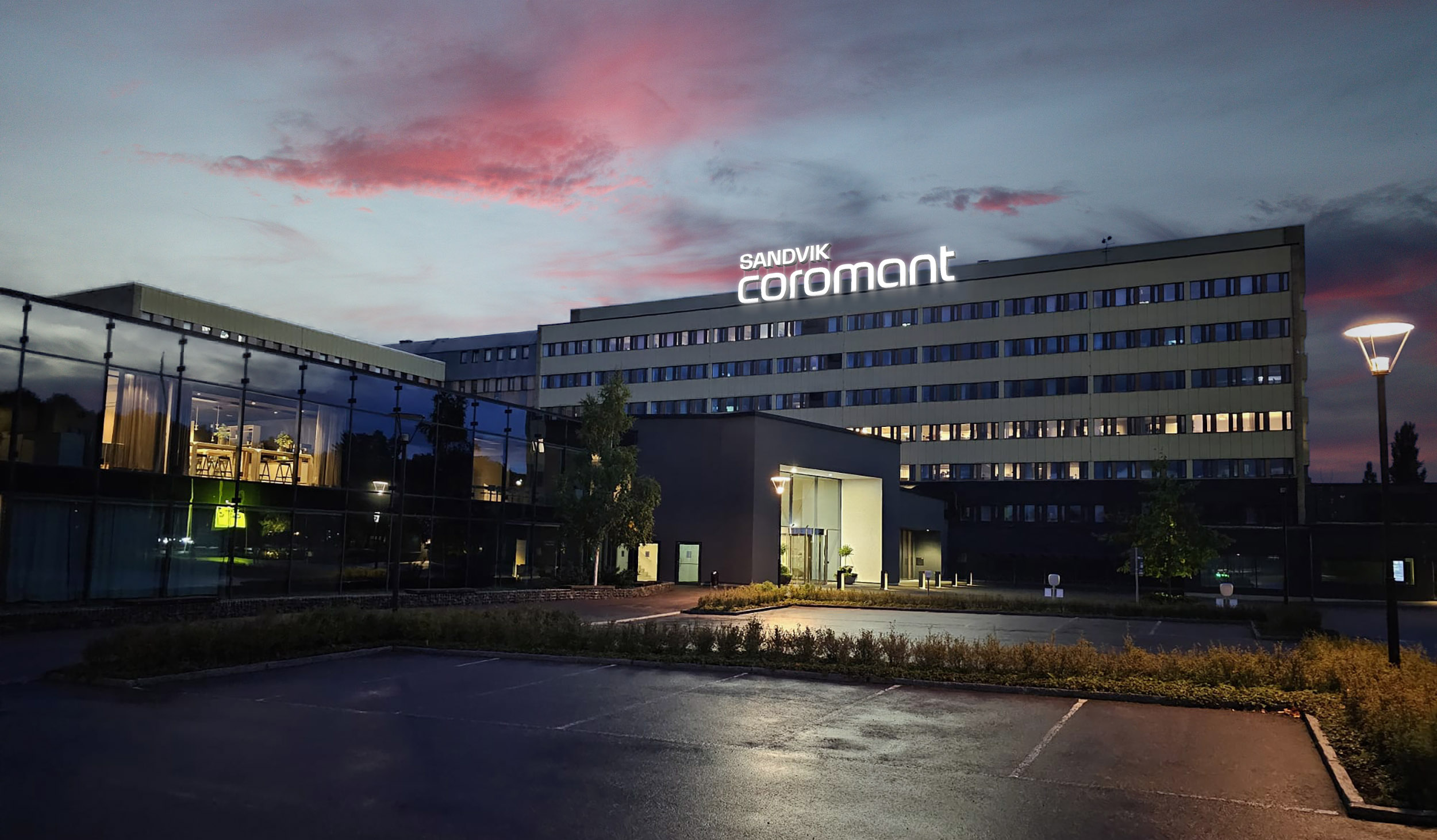

Sandvik Coromant is a Swedish company that supplies cutting tools and services to the metal cutting industry.

Sandvik Coromant is headquartered in Sandviken, Sweden and is represented in more than 150 countries with about 8000 employees worldwide. It is part of the business area Sandvik Machining Solutions within the global industrial group Sandvik.

== Metalworking focus ==
Sandvik Coromant produced an extensive range of metal-cutting tools:

- Turning, including general turning, heavy turning, small part machining, parting and grooving, hard part turning and threading.
- Milling, including face milling, shoulder milling, profile milling, turn-milling, high feed milling, chamfering, slot milling and thread milling.
- Drilling, including general drilling, step and chamfer drilling, composite drilling and tapping.
- Boring, including rough boring, fine boring and reaming.
- Tool holding, including tools for turning centres and lathe tools, machining centres, multitask machines and sliding head machines.
- Digital machining, including advanced software and tools that support digital manufacturing, from design and planning to machining and machining analysis.

== History in brief ==
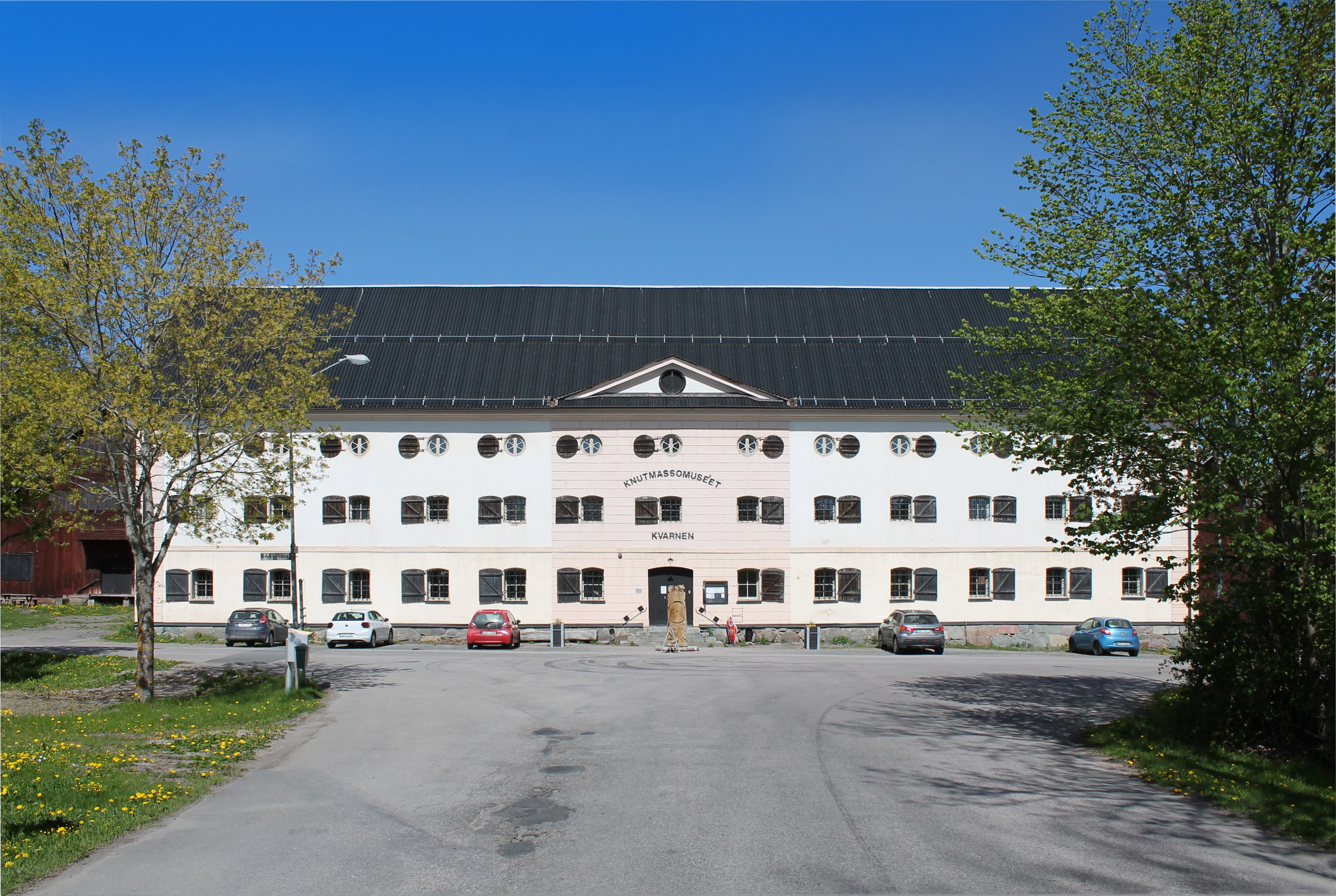
Sandvik Coromant museum in Gimo

1942: The company began as a production unit for cemented carbide tools in Sandviken, Sweden, when Wilhelm Haglund is assigned the job as manager of the unit. However, in 1951, new innovations and manufacturing methods lead to the establishment of a more industrialized unit in Gimo, Sweden.

1957: Scrapers become the first product with mechanically clamped “indexable inserts” or “throw-away inserts”. The birth of the T-Max holder and the use of indexable inserts.

1969: Heat-resistant Gamma Coating, or GC, is introduced as a grade.

1972: The Multi-Service marketing campaign is created, and the yellow coat becomes an important symbol. Tool-pool, machine-adapted tool recommendations and mini-catalogs are made available.

1990: Coromant Capto, aka CC, a single holding system for both rotating and stationary spindles, is introduced. Coromant Capto (Latin for “I am gripping”) is an established system and an ISO standard around the world.

1997: Sandvik Coromant offers to repurchase used cemented carbide inserts for recycling.

2008: Sandvik Coromant acquires Norwegian anti-vibration tool developer Teeness. The unique Silent Tools damping adaptors allow for increased cutting parameters and a more secure process.

2013: Sandvik Coromant researchers discover the possibility to control coating crystals at an atomic level to create a uniform, tightly packed, thermal-protected coating for new levels of hardness: Inveio coating technology is introduced.

2016: CoroPlus makes its debut, used in the design, planning, monitoring of machining performance and the optimization of machining processes.

2017: PrimeTurning is introduced, a new methodology enabling turning in all directions.

2019: The production unit in Gimo, Sweden, is officially announced as a "lighthouse" by World Economic Forum as a role model in industry 4.0.

== Research and development ==
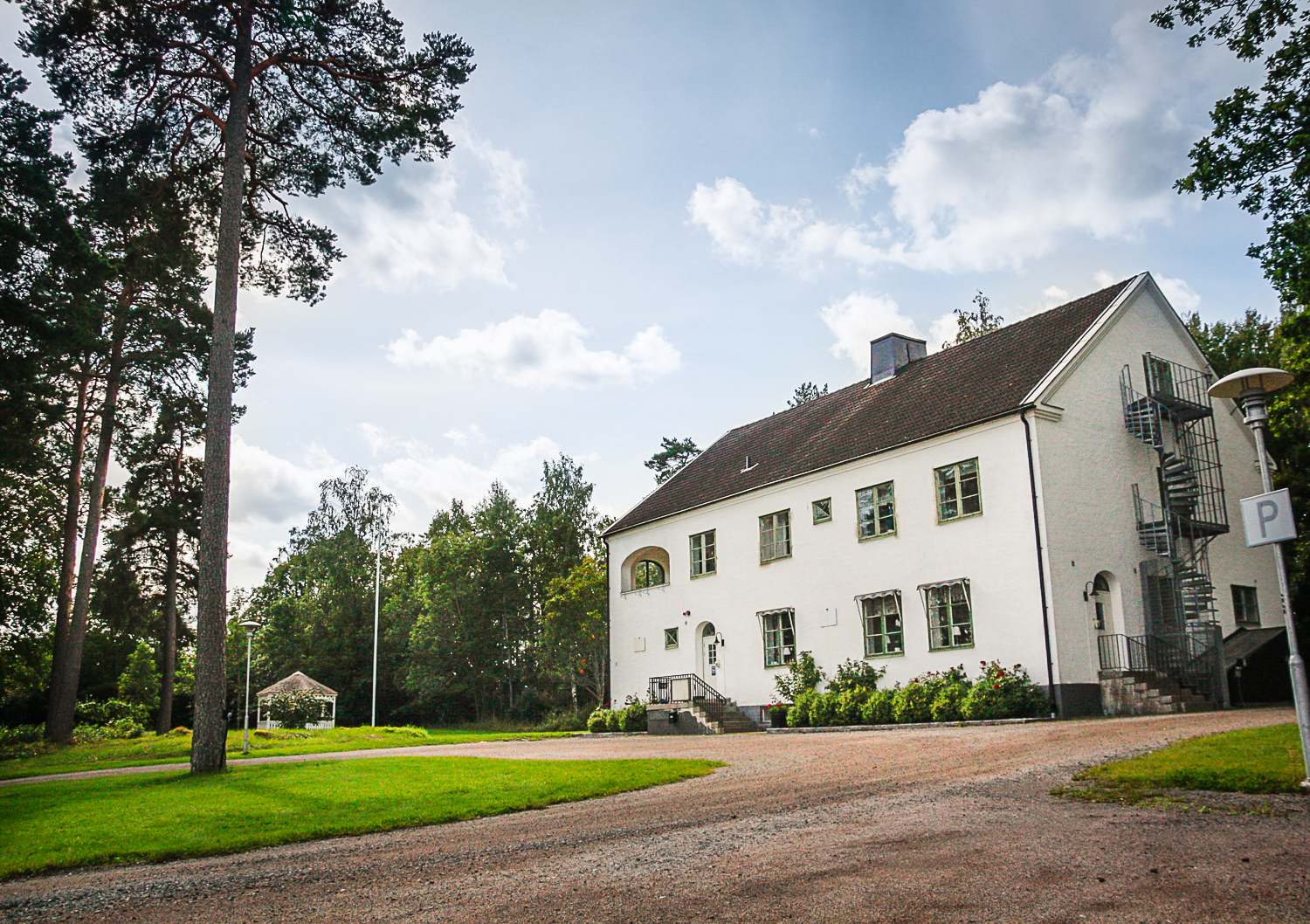
The white villa, a part of Sandvik Coromant in Gimo

Sandvik Coromant employs 500 researchers working at research and development centers around the globe. In total, some 60 research and testing facilities work in close cooperation with machine tool manufacturers, machining tool agents, and customers across a wide range of industries.

== Training and education ==
Training

Among its e-learning courses, Sandvik Coromant offers Metalcutting Technology Training; some 35,000 users are registered for the program.

Education

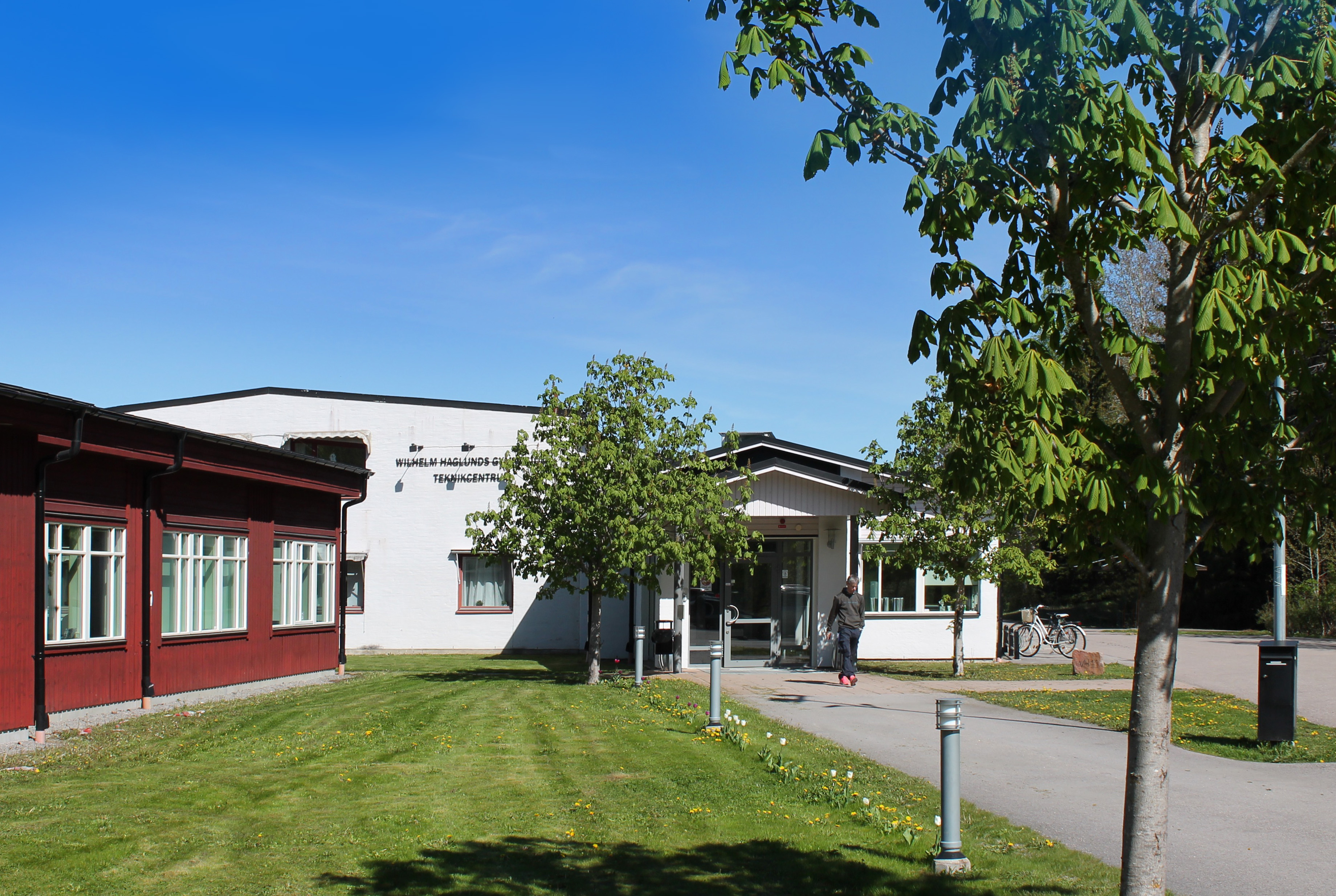
Willhelm Haglunds Gymnasium that is 90% owned by Sandvik Coromant

Sandvik Coromant collaborates with numerous educational institutions and organizations worldwide.

- Sandvik AB founded the technical upper secondary school Gӧranssonska Skolan in Sandviken, Sweden in 2002 to provide students with the technical competencies needed to bridge the skills gap the manufacturing industry is facing.
- Wilhelm Haglund's Gymnasium is a joint project between Sandvik AB and Östhammar Municipality, founded in 2007. It is a technical upper secondary school in Gimo, Sweden, which provides students with three years of technical education in preparation for workforce entry.
- In 2008, the Sandvik Coromant Center for Machinist Technology opened at the Northern Alberta Institute of Technology.
- Sandvik Coromant is also engaged in various R&D projects at the Chalmers University of Technology Materials and Manufacturing Technology and Applied Mechanics.

Partnerships

Sandvik Coromant is a member of the Advanced Manufacturing Research Centre (AMRC) in the UK, working with the centre's partners: Boeing, Rolls-Royce and the University of Sheffield. The AMRC shares research and support in areas of assembly, composite materials, structural testing, and advanced machining for the aerospace industry.

Sandvik Coromant has also partnered with the Commonwealth Center for Advanced Manufacturing as one of its originating industry members, as well as the Connecticut Center for Advanced Technology in the United States and the Manufacturing Technology Center in the UK.

== See also ==
- SAF 2507
