= Ian Gorham =

British businessman (born 1971)

- Born: Ian David Gorham; 30 November 1971 (age 54)
- Occupation: Businessman
- Years active: 1992–present
- Title: Investor. Former CEO, Hargreaves Lansdown plc. Former Head of UK Financial Services, Grant Thornton LLP
- Term: 2010 – September 2017
- Predecessor: Peter Hargreaves
- Successor: Chris Hill

Ian David Gorham (born 30 November 1971) is a British businessman. He was the chief executive (CEO) of Hargreaves Lansdown plc, a British financial service company from 2010 to 2017. Since 2017 he has been a stock market and fund investor and owner of businesses including Skyline Chess, Midgap Properties and Cookalong Kitchen.

== Early life ==
He has a bachelor's degree in economics from the University of Warwick.

== Career ==
He was CEO of Hargreaves Lansdown since September 2010, having joined in September 2009 as chief operating officer. He qualified as a chartered accountant in 1996. Previously he helped build Deloitte's financial services operations and from September 2003 – September 2009, worked for Grant Thornton International, rising to Partner and Head of their UK financial services business.

In September 2016, it was announced that Gorham would step down as CEO of Hargreaves Lansdown by September 2017, and would be succeeded by Chris Hill.
