= Chris Hill (businessman) =

British businessman (born 1971)

- Born: Christopher Frederick Hill; 5 June 1971 (age 54)
- Education: Cheltenham College
- Alma mater: Keble College, Oxford
- Title: CEO of Hargreaves Lansdown
- Term: September 2017–August 2023
- Predecessor: Ian Gorham
- Successor: Dan Olley

Christopher Frederick Hill (born 5 June 1971) is a British businessman. He was CEO of Hargreaves Lansdown, a financial services company which is a constituent of the FTSE 250 Index.

== Early life ==
Hill was educated at Cheltenham College, then earned a degree in modern history from Keble College, Oxford.

== Career ==
Before joining Hargreaves, Hill was employed as chief financial officer (CFO) by Travelex UK Ltd, CFO and executive director by IG Group Holdings Plc, finance director by VWR International LLC, a principal by Arthur Andersen LLP and a principal by General Electric International Operations.

In September 2016, it was announced that Ian Gorham would step down as CEO of Hargreaves Lansdown by September 2017, and would be succeeded by Hill.

Following the Neil Woodford Fund management issues he issued the following statement in June 2019 'I would like to apologise personally to all clients who have been impacted by the recent problems with the Woodford Equity Income Fund. We all share their disappointment and frustration. Our priority right now is to support our clients and keep them informed.'

Hill was succeeded as CEO by Dan Olley in August 2023.

== Personal life ==
Hill is married and has a son and two daughters.
