= Peter Hargreaves =

British businessman and executive (born 1946)

- Born: Peter Kendal Hargreaves; 5 October 1946 (age 80); Clitheroe, Lancashire
- Education: Clitheroe Royal Grammar School
- Occupation: Businessman
- Known for: Co-founder of Hargreaves Lansdown; Chairman of Blue Whale Capital
- Website: www.bluewhale.co.uk

Peter Kendal Hargreaves CBE (born 5 October 1946) is a British businessman and executive. Along with Stephen Lansdown, he founded Hargreaves Lansdown, a large UK financial services company, where he retains a 10 per cent shareholding. He is a partner in Blue Whale Capital, an investment company that was launched in 2017.

== Early life ==
Hargreaves was born in Clitheroe and educated at Clitheroe Royal Grammar School in Lancashire.

== Career ==
Trained as an accountant, Peter Hargreaves initially worked as a computer salesman. He then started Hargreaves Lansdown trading from a bedroom in 1981; in 2010, he stood down as chief executive and, in the same year, received £18 million in dividends. He was succeeded as CEO by Ian Gorham. His wealth was reported at £2,315 million according to the Sunday Times Rich List 2017, making him the 51st richest person in the UK. Hargreaves joined the board of ITM Power in February 2004 as a non-executive director: he has invested heavily in ITM Power and recruited Dr Graham Cooley as the company's CEO in July 2009. In March 2016 he joined the Leave.EU movement to campaign for the UK's exit from the European Union. He was the top donor to the Brexit campaign contributing over £3 million to the Leave campaign. In September 2017, Hargreaves announced a £25 million backing in Blue Whale Capital – a new asset management company set up by previous colleague, Stephen Yiu.

It was announced in August 2020 that Hargreaves would receive £63.4 million in dividends after Hargreaves Lansdown's profits increased by 24% to £378.3 million in the 12 months leading up to 30 June 2020.

According to The Sunday Times Rich List in 2020 his net worth was estimated at £2.4 billion. In 2021, he came ninth in a list of the top ten biggest taxpayers in the UK, having paid a tax bill of £91.4 million that year.

In April 2025, Hargreaves nominated himself as a non-executive board member of Hargreaves Lansdown, which he is able to do as a shareholder. He also nominated his son as a board observer.

In October 2025, Hargreaves stepped down from the board of Hargreaves Lansdown, and his son Robert took his seat.

In February 2026, Peter Hargreaves was listed on the Sunday Times Tax list with his wealth estimated as £210 million.

== Honours ==
Hargreaves was appointed Commander of the Order of the British Empire (CBE) in the 2014 New Year Honours for services to business innovation, financial services and the City of Bristol.

== Politics ==
Hargreaves financially supported the Leave.EU campaign in 2016, donating £3.2 million to the Leave.EU campaign founded by Arron Banks and wrote to 15 million UK householders asking them to support the leave campaign in the European Union membership referendum.

In May 2016, Hargreaves said that Brexit will lead to insecurity, which will turn out to be very effective. Hargreaves said that Theresa May should reassure the three million EU nationals already in the UK that their current rights would be maintained.

Hargreaves donated £1 million to the Conservatives’ election fund in 2019.

== Personal life ==
In 1986 he married Rosemary; they have one son and one daughter. They live in a Georgian property in the West Country. He owns three racehorses.
