= Walter Kempster =

English cricketer and soldier

Personal information
- Full name: Walter Francis Herbert Kempster
- Born: 18 May 1909; Chinwangtao, Beizhili, China
- Died: 26 June 1952 (aged 43); All Stretton, Shropshire, England
- Batting: Unknown

Domestic team information
- Years: Team
- 1929/30: Europeans

Career statistics
Competition	First-class
Matches	1
Runs scored	10
Batting average	5.00
100s/50s	–/–
Top score	10
Catches/stumpings	1/–
- Source: Cricinfo, 24 December 2023

Walter Francis Herbert Kempster DSO OBE (18 May 1909 – 26 June 1952) was an English first-class cricketer and an officer in the British Army.

== Life and military career ==
Kempster was born in China at Chinwangtao in May 1909. He was educated in England at Cheltenham College, where he played for and captained the college cricket team. From there, he progressed to the Royal Military College at Sandhurst, from where he graduated into the King's Shropshire Light Infantry (KSLI) as a second lieutenant in January 1929. Shortly after gaining his commission, Kempster served in the North-West Frontier Province of British India, where the Afridi Redshirt Rebellion was taking place. For his service there, he gained a medal and clasp. While serving in India, he made a single appearance in first-class cricket for the Europeans cricket team against the Muslims at Lahore in the 1929–30 Lahore Tournament. Batting twice in the match, he was dismissed without scoring by Mohammad Nissar, while in their second innings he was dismissed for 10 runs by Jahangir Khan. Kempster was also well known in army cricket, having represented the British Army cricket team several times. Wisden described him as a "sound and attractive batsman".

In the KSLI, he was promoted to lieutenant in January 1932. Kempster was seconded to the Sierra Leone Battalion in April 1937, an appointment which last until 1938. It was while seconded that he was promoted to captain in December 1937. By December 1938, he had returned to the KSLI and was made an adjutant in December 1938. Kempster served in the Second World War with distinction. He was mentioned in dispatches in March 1945 for gallant and distinguished service in the North-West Europe campaign, at which point he held the temporary rank of brigadier; he was further recognised for his service during the campaign by being made an OBE in the same month and a Companion of the Distinguished Service Order in August 1945.

Following the end of the war, Kempster was promoted to major in January 1946. He was later given the war substantive rank of lieutenant colonel, prior to his promotion to colonel in December 1950. He was specially employed in January 1951, and was given the temporary rank of major general. In December 1951, he was promoted to brigadier, prior to his death in June 1952 at All Stretton, Shropshire.
