= Francis Brandt =

English cricketer and high court judge

Personal information
- Full name: Francis Brandt
- Born: 6 May 1840; Pendleton, Lancashire, England
- Died: 17 July 1925 (aged 85); Cheltenham, Gloucestershire, England
- Batting: Unknown
- Bowling: Unknown

Domestic team information
- Years: Team
- 1859–1861: Oxford University

Career statistics
Competition	First-class
Matches	7
Runs scored	76
Batting average	8.44
100s/50s	–/–
Top score	21*
Balls bowled	632
Wickets	16
Bowling average	15.30
5 wickets in innings	–
10 wickets in match	–
Best bowling	4/22
Catches/stumpings	8/–
- Source: Cricinfo, 16 November 2019

Francis Brandt (6 May 1840 – 17 July 1925) was a High Court judge in British India and an English first-class cricketer.

The son of Robert Brandt, he was born at Pendleton in May 1840. He was educated at Cheltenham College, where he played for the cricket eleven and was coached by James Lillywhite senior. He was considered the best public school bowler in 1857. From Cheltenham he went up to Brasenose College, Oxford where he made his debut in first-class cricket for Oxford University against the Marylebone Cricket Club at Oxford in 1859. He made two further first-class appearances in 1859, playing in The University Match against Cambridge at Lord's, as well as appearing for the Gentlemen of the North against the Gentlemen of the South at Liverpool. He made one first-class appearance each for Oxford and the Gentlemen of the North in 1860, before making two further first-class appearances for Oxford in 1861 as captain. In seven first-class matches, Brandt scored 76 runs at an average of 8.44 and a high score of 21 not out. With the ball, he took 16 wickets at a bowling average of 15.30 and best figures of 4 for 22.

After graduating from Oxford, he entered in the Indian Civil Service in September 1862. He served Indian Civil Service in a number of capacities, before being appointed as a judge at the Madras High Court in 1884, three years prior to his retirement. Following his retirement, Brandt returned to England, where he settled at Cheltenham, where he died in July 1925. He was married to Lucy Sophia Dobson, with the couple having at least one son who was killed in action aboard HMS Monmouth during the First World War.
