= Reginald le Bas =

English cricketer, solicitor and barrister

Personal information
- Full name: Reginald Vincent le Bas
- Born: 26 July 1856; Friern Barnet, Middlesex, England
- Died: 7 July 1938 (aged 81); Winsford, Somerset, England
- Batting: Unknown
- Relatives: Montagu Brocas Burrows (nephew)

Domestic team information
- Years: Team
- 1882: Marylebone Cricket Club

Career statistics
Competition	First-class
Matches	1
Runs scored	0
Batting average	0.00
100s/50s	–/–
Top score	0
Catches/stumpings	2/–
- Source: Cricinfo, 12 September 2021

Reginald Vincent le Bas (26 July 1856 — 7 July 1938) was an English first-class cricketer, solicitor and barrister.

The son of the clergyman Henry Vincent le Bas, he was born in July 1856 at Friern Barnet, Middlesex. He was educated at Cheltenham College and became a solicitor after leaving Cheltenham. He made a single appearance in first-class cricket for the Marylebone Cricket Club (MCC) against Cambridge University at Fenner's in 1882. He was dismissed twice in the match for nought, by Robert Ramsay and C. Aubrey Smith respectively. le Bas later became a barrister, passing the bar exam in October 1894 and gaining admittance as a barrister to Lincoln's Inn. le Bas died in July 1938 at Winsford, Somerset. His nephew was the British Army officer and cricketer Montagu Brocas Burrows.
