= Ashton Gate (stadium) =

Stadium in Bristol, England

- 'The Gate'

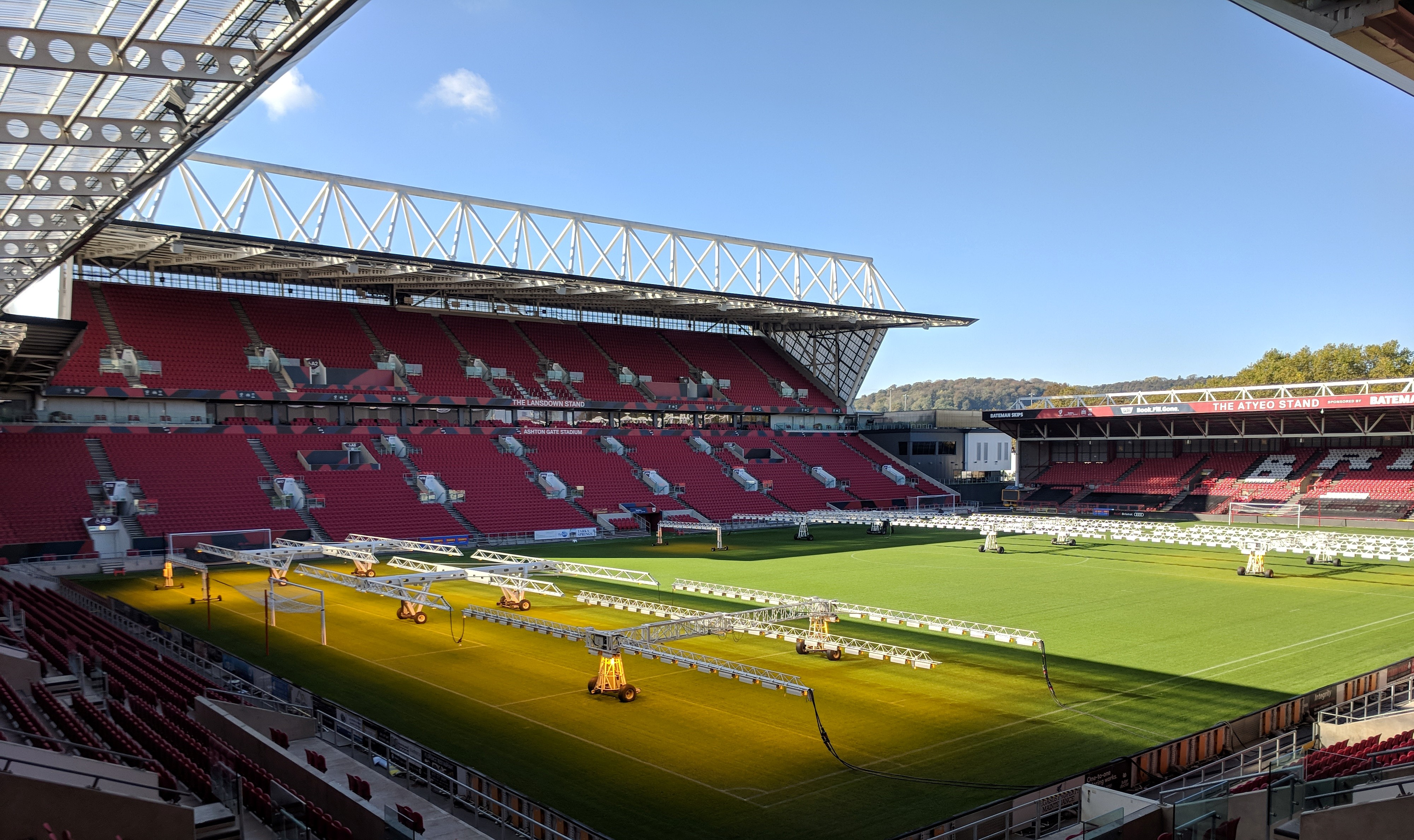
- UEFA
- Interactive map of Ashton Gate
- Full name: Ashton Gate Stadium
- Location: Ashton Road, Bristol BS3 2EJ
- Coordinates: 51°26′24″N 2°37′13″W
- Capacity: 26,462
- Surface: Desso Grassmaster
- Record attendance: 43,335 (Bristol City F.C. vs Preston North End F.C., 16 February 1935)
- Field size: 115 by 75 yards (105 m × 69 m)
- Public transit: Parson Street. The stadium also has designated bus routes (AG1, AG2, AG3) that operate after the matches. Alternatively, bus route 24 begins and terminates on Winterstoke Road, directly next to the stadium, or there are bus stops for the 75,76, and m1 buses located near Parson St train station.

Construction
- Opened: 1887

Tenants
- Bristol Bears (2014–present); Bedminster F.C. (until 1900); Bristol City F.C. (1904–present); Bristol City W.F.C. (2023–present)

Ashton Gate is a multi-use stadium in Ashton Gate, Bristol, England, and is the home of the Bristol Bears rugby team and the Bristol City football team. Located in the south-west of the city, just south of the River Avon, it currently has an all-seated capacity of 26,462, though for marketing reasons this figure has often been advertised as 27,000.

== History and arrangement ==
Ashton Gate was the home of Bedminster until their 1900 merger with Bristol South End who played at St John's Lane, and the merged club played at St John's Lane until the end of the 1903–04 season, when they moved to Ashton Gate.

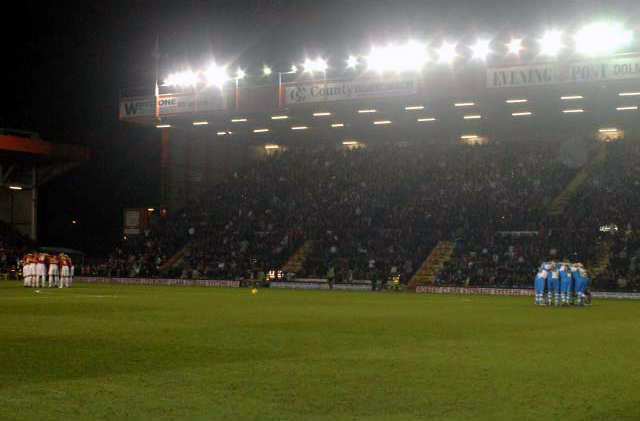
The Dolman Stand at a Bristol City home game vs rivals Bristol Rovers

The ground has also played a part in the history of rugby in the city. Bristol Rugby played there on a number of occasions since the 1920s, one occasion being on 27 December 2006 when they defeated local rivals Bath Rugby 16–6 whilst selling out the stadium for an all-time record Premiership crowd outside of Twickenham. Several rugby internationals have been held, starting with England versus Wales in 1899. 100 years later, the All Blacks took on Tonga in a Rugby World Cup pool match. As of the 2014–2015 season, Bristol Rugby permanently moved to Ashton Gate.

It has hosted three England under-21 international friendlies. The first was against Italy on 12 February 1997 with Darren Eadie scoring the winner in a 1–0 win in front of a crowd of 13,850. The second was against Romania's under-21s on 21 August 2007. It ended in a 1–1 draw with Matt Derbyshire giving the hosts the lead on the eighth minute but Joe Hart's 25th minute own goal gifted the visitors a draw but they had Cristian Scutaru sent off on the seventy second minute for a second bookable offence. There were 18,640 in attendance. The third was against Uzbekistan's under-21s on 10 August 2010. The hosts beat the visitors 2–0 with Danny Rose scoring on the 64th minute and Martin Kelly scoring on the 78th minute. There were 9,821 in attendance. It also hosted the 2021 National League play-off final after it was moved from Wembley Stadium to avoid clashes with UEFA Euro 2020 matches.

After their promotion to the Women's Super League for the 2023–24 season it was announced that Bristol City Women would play all of their home games at Ashton Gate, having previously played the majority of their games at the club's High Performance Centre.

=== Current stands ===
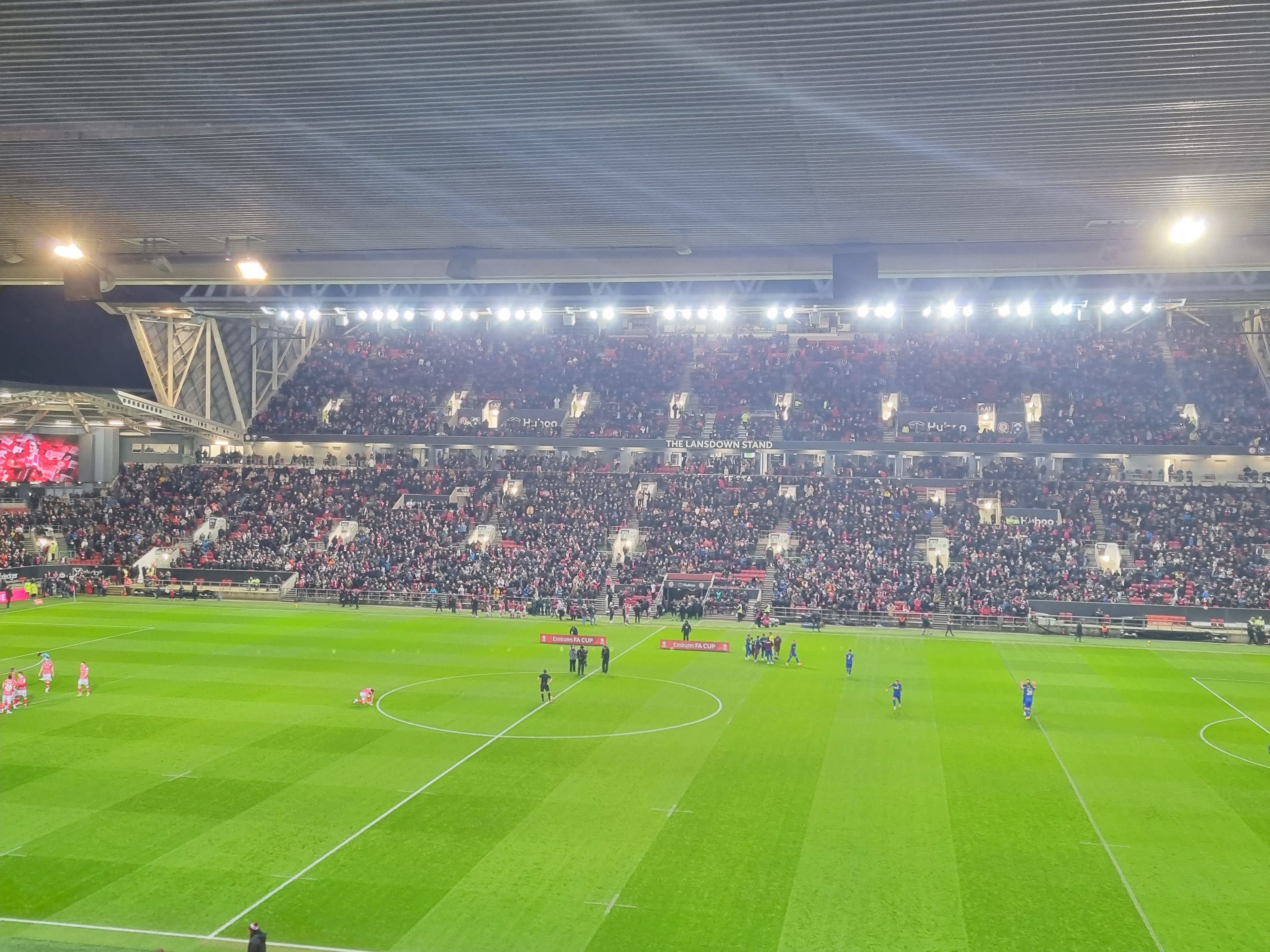
Lansdown Stand before an FA Cup 3rd Round Replay vs West Ham United 16 January 2024

Lansdown Stand

Originally earmarked the "West Stand", this structure was completed in time for the start of the 2016–17 season and was immediately renamed The Lansdown Stand in honour of the majority shareholder, Stephen Lansdown, who funded the Ashton Gate redevelopment. The stand marked the completion of the modern redevelopment of Ashton Gate. It is the largest in the stadium, with a capacity of 9,506. The stand has two tiers, accommodating 4,801 seats on the bottom and 4,371 seats on the top. The two levels are separated by a central area equipped with eighteen executive boxes. The roof is covered in solar panels to provide a renewable energy source to power the entire stadium. The Lansdown Stand houses the tunnel, team benches and TV gantry, whilst beneath the main seating areas are the changing rooms and offices. Three blocks of the upper tier of the Lansdown stand are designated as a family area for football matches, and one block of the lower tier is designated as the family area for rugby matches.

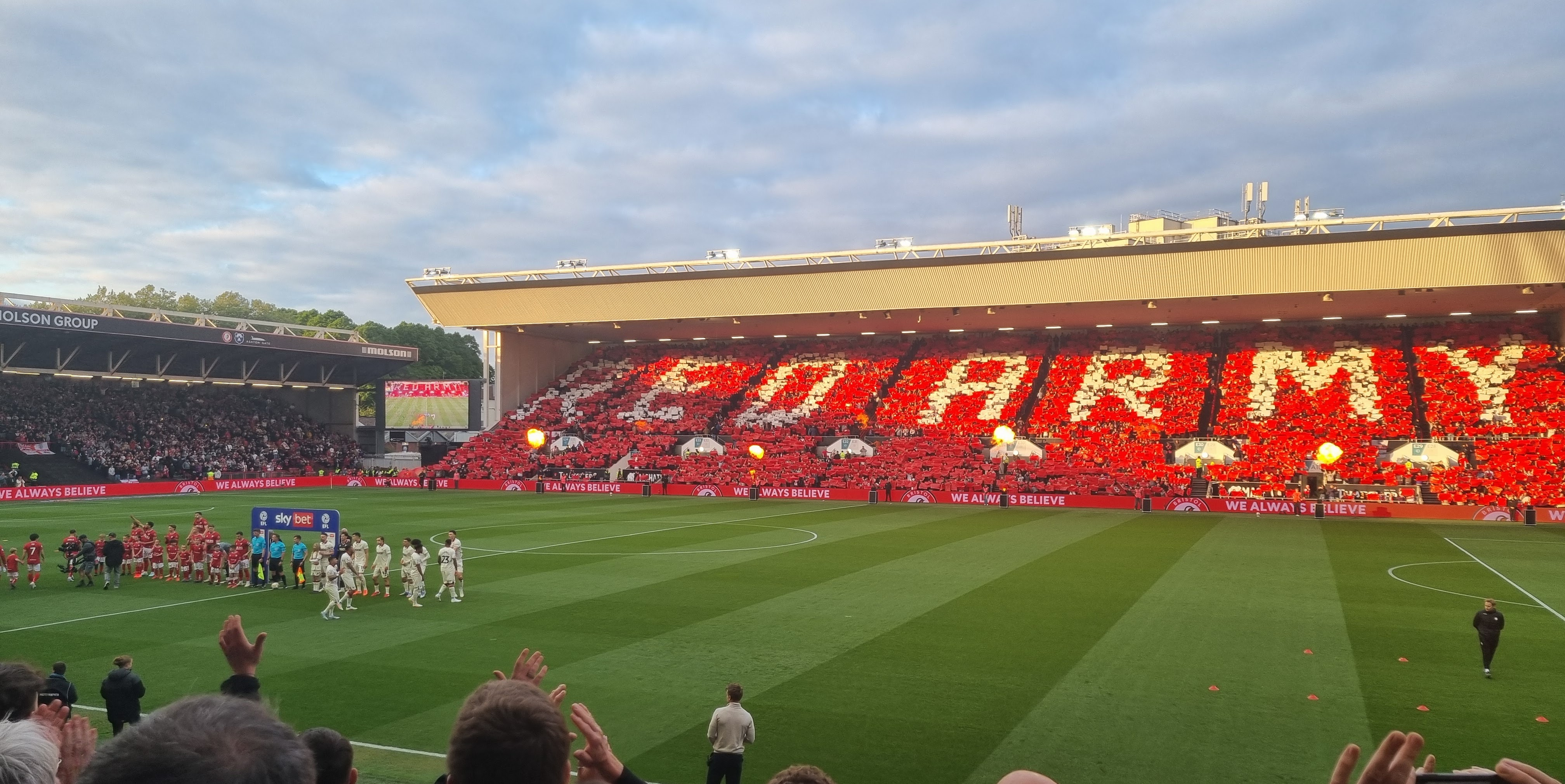
Fan display in the Dolman Stand before the EFL Championship Play-off semi final vs Sheffield United, 8 May 2025

Dolman Stand

The Dolman Stand, which lies opposite the Lansdown Stand, was built in 1970, making it the oldest stand at Ashton Gate. At the time of construction it had a small, flat Family Enclosure in front of it, but during the close-season of 1996 this area which was built up and converted into seating. In the summer of 2007, following Bristol City's promotion to the Championship, the original wooden seats in the upper area were replaced by modern plastic seats. The stand is named after the former club chairman and president Harry Dolman. It was given a complete makeover during the summer of 2015 as part of the overall redevelopment of Ashton Gate. The current stand has a capacity of 6,675 seats (5,123 upper, 1,552 lower).

Atyeo Stand

The Atyeo stand is the smallest in the stadium with a capacity of 3,900. Originally holding around 4,200 spectators, it was constructed in the summer of 1994. Built in order to comply with the Taylor Report - which required all-seater venues for every club in the top two Divisions - it was designed to replace an open terrace, which up until then had been known as the "Open End". The modern Atyeo Stand still contains the old dressing rooms and a large gymnasium. It is named after Bristol City legend John Atyeo, who played 645 times for City and scored 351 goals, making him the club's top goalscorer ever. He died in 1993, a year before the new stand opened. After the demolition of the Wedlock Stand, the north-east section of this stand was used to house the away fans. After construction of the Lansdown Stand, away fans were situated in the western three-quarters of the Atyeo stand. The whole stand was made available for away fans from the 2017/18 season onwards, reconfigured to hold 3,900 spectators. It is usually closed for rugby matches.

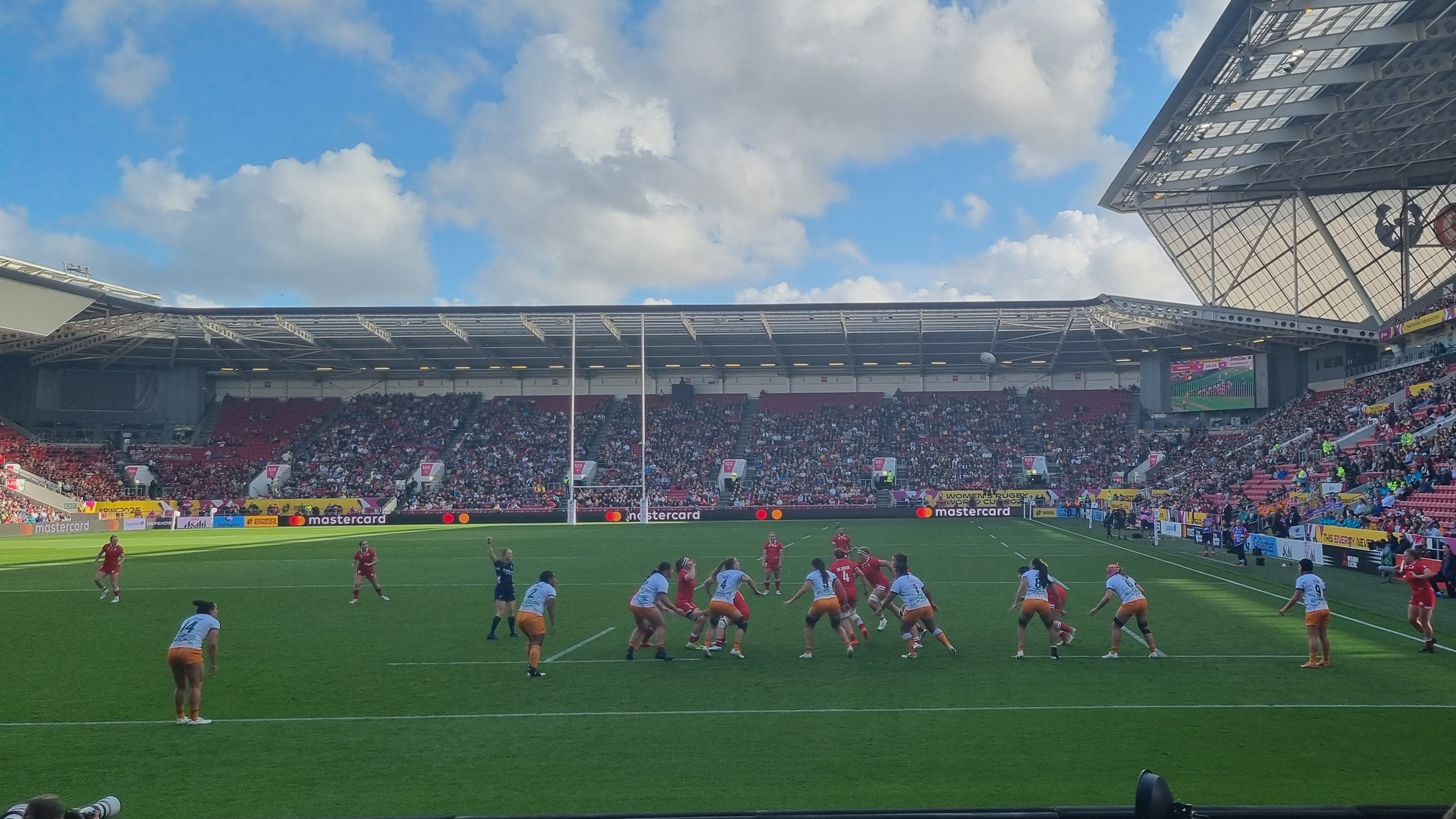
South Stand during the 2025 Women's Rugby World Cup Quarter Final between Australia & Canada. 13 September 2025

South Stand

Known as the first phase in the modern redevelopment of Ashton Gate, the South Stand was completed following the conclusion of the triumphant 2014–15 season. It has a capacity of 6,381, including 40 spaces and seats for wheelchair users and their assistants. It also includes a "singing section" for City's more vociferous fans, which is situated near the corner flag where the new stand meets the Dolman Stand at the south-east corner of the pitch. Unlike the other stands at Ashton Gate, it is not named after a person who had strong ties with the club. The stand is linked to its neighbouring Dolman and Lansdown stands via a concourse.

=== Former stands ===
Wedlock "East End" Stand

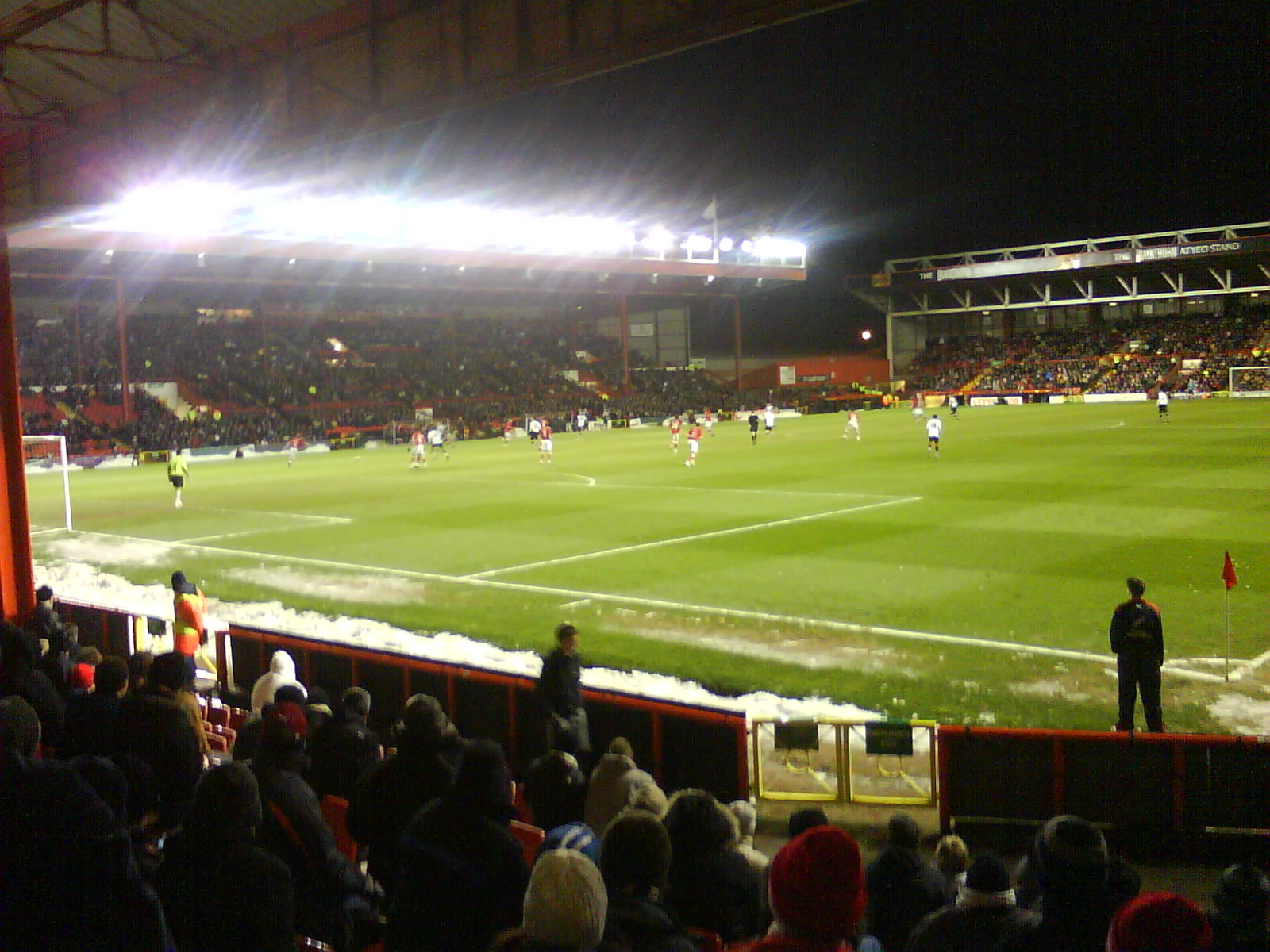
View from the home section of the Wedlock Stand

The old East End was demolished during the summer of 2014 and has been completely rebuilt to modern standards. It was built as a covered terrace in 1928, converted to seats in the 1990s and was the traditional home fans' end until 1994. It was known as the East End to City fans.

Williams Stand

The Williams Stand was on the southwest side, which included the directors' box and press box, and was built in 1958. The lower part of the stand was a terrace known as the Grand Enclosure until it was converted to seating in the 1990s. This stand was also named after a former chairman Des Williams. Demolition of this stand occurred in June 2015 in preparation for rebuilding to modern standards over the course of the next year.

== Redevelopment of Ashton Gate ==
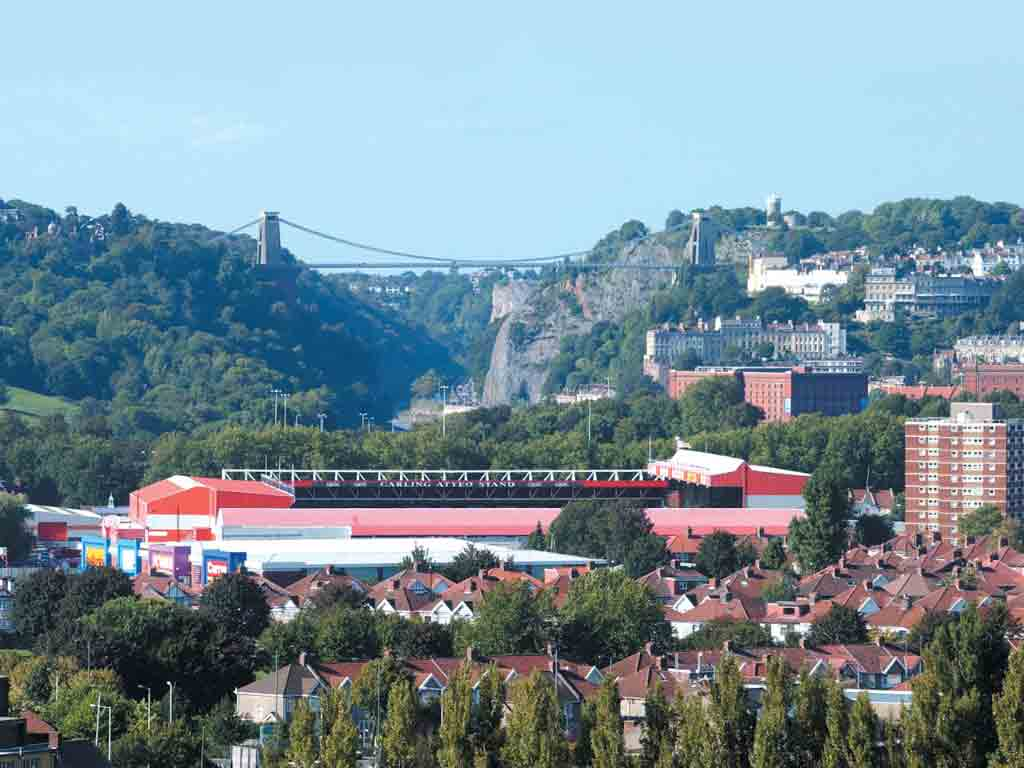
Pre-redevelopment Ashton Gate with the Clifton Suspension Bridge in the background

Following extensive planning and the failed bid to develop a new ground at Ashton Vale, and criticism of the failure of so many major leisure and sporting projects in Bristol, Bristol City finally decided to press ahead with a major redevelopment of the current site at Ashton Gate. This was approved in late 2013, with final clearance given in spring 2014, and work started in May 2014, following the final home fixture of the 2013–14 season.

The plans for redevelopment were as follows:

- Demolition of the existing Williams and Wedlock (East End) stands, to be replaced by new, larger stands, with executive boxes.
- Extension of the existing Dolman stand
- Shifting of the current pitch by 5 metres to enable the Dolman extension, and a new pitch laid to enable shared use with the rugby club
- Other works to the ground to bring it in line with modern stadia, with capacity of around 27,000

The works were completed prior to the start of the 2016–17 season.

== Other uses ==
=== Rugby Union ===
Since August 2014 Ashton Gate has also been the home of Bristol Bears.

Ashton Gate has also held two mens' international rugby union matches, as follows:

Date	Competition	Home team		Away team	
18 January 1908	1908 Home Nations Championship	England	18	Wales	28
3 October 1999	1999 Rugby World Cup, Pool 2	New Zealand	45	Tonga	9

In September 2020, it was announced the stadium would host the 2019–20 Heineken Champions Cup final on 17 October, the match was originally scheduled to be held in Marseille but was moved due to the COVID-19 pandemic.

==== 2025 Women's Rugby World Cup ====
In August 2023, the stadium was confirmed as one of eight host venues for the 2025 Women's Rugby World Cup.

2025 Women's Rugby World Cup matches held at Ashton Gate Stadium
Date	Country	Score	Country	Stage of Tournament	Attendance
13 September 2025	Canada	46-5	Australia	Quarter-finals	16,571
14 September 2025	England	40-8	Scotland	Quarter-finals	25,295
19 September 2025	New Zealand	19-34	Canada	Semi-finals	24,592
20 September 2025	England	35-17	France	Semi-finals	25,478

=== Rugby League ===
Ashton Gate has held one rugby league tour match, as follows:

Date	Competition	Home team		Away team	
20 December 1911	1911/12 Kangaroo Tour	Wales & West	3	Australia	23

=== Music ===
Ashton Gate has played host to concerts, including those of the Arctic Monkeys, The Who, The Rolling Stones, Westlife, Bryan Adams, Neil Diamond, Bon Jovi, The Best, Elton John Meat Loaf, Muse, Spice Girls, Take That, The Killers, and Kings of Leon.

== See also ==
- Bristol City Stadium
- List of stadiums in the United Kingdom by capacity
- Lists of stadiums
