= James Brettell =

English cricketer (born 1962)

Personal information
- Full name: James Gordon Brettell
- Born: 19 December 1962 (age 63); Woking, Surrey, England
- Batting: Right-handed
- Bowling: Slow left-arm orthodox
- Relatives: David Brettell (brother)

Domestic team information
- Years: Team
- 1984–1985: Oxford University

Career statistics
Competition	First-class
Matches	5
Runs scored	0
Batting average	0.00
100s/50s	–/–
Top score	0*
Balls bowled	466
Wickets	5
Bowling average	68.00
5 wickets in innings	–
10 wickets in match	–
Best bowling	2/87
Catches/stumpings	2/–
- Source: Cricinfo, 2 February 2020

James Gordon Brettell (born 19 December 1962) is an English former first-class cricketer.

Brettell was born at Woking in December 1962. He was educated at Cheltenham College, before going up to Lincoln College, Oxford. While studying at Oxford, Brettell played first-class cricket for Oxford University. He made his debut against Lancashire in 1984, before making four further appearances in 1985. Playing as a slow left-arm orthodox bowler, he took 5 wickets in his five matches, with best figures of 2 for 87. His brother, David, also played first-class cricket.
