= Dormer Pramet =

Manufacturer and supplier of cutting tools

Dormer Pramet s.r.o.
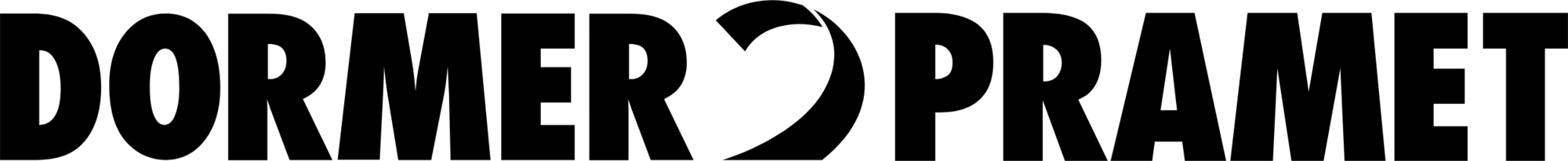
- Type: Public
- Industry: Cutting tools manufacturing
- Founded: 4 September 1913; 112 years ago
- Website: dormerpramet.com

Dormer Pramet is a global manufacturer and supplier of cutting tools for the engineering industry, including drilling, milling, threading and turning tools. Its origins date back to 1913, making it one of the world's oldest specialist manufacturers of engineers cutting tools.

The current entity formed in 2014 following the merger of Dormer Tools and the IPS Group (Impero – Pramet – Safety). The expanded operation has 30 offices worldwide serving 100 markets and employs around 1,500 people.

== Company history ==
=== Dormer Tools (1913–2013) ===
Dormer Tools was founded on 4 September 1913 by H. A. Dormer and L. Robertson as The Sheffield Twist Drill Co. Ltd on the corner of Solferino Street and Cemetery Road in Sheffield, England, with a workforce of around 20 people.

On 5 June 1916, while serving with the diplomatic service as Deputy Director of Production at the Ministry of Munitions, Robertson was killed aboard HMS Hampshire along with Field Marshal Lord Kitchener, Secretary of State for War.

The Dormer brand trademark – originally used as a brand name for the company's twist drills – was registered in 1924. In time, the Dormer name was so well known globally that it would become the official company name (see 1975).

In the early 1950s the company became the first drill manufacturer in Europe to introduce the steam temper treatment to its products.

In 1975 SKF acquired the company and, in the process, became the world's largest manufacturer of High-Speed Steel cutting tools.

In 1992 Dormer was acquired by the Sandvik group.

In 2007 Dormer merged with Precision Twist Drill and Union Butterfield in US, Canada and Mexico.

=== Pramet Tools (1951–2013) ===
Pramet's roots date to 1933 when the Stellwag company began production of cemented carbide and natural diamond tools.

The Pramet organization was founded in 1951 in Šumperk, Czech Republic. The company name is derived from the principle of the technology used to produce its products – powder metallurgy.

On 1 September 1999, Pramet was acquired by the multinational Seco Tools group. A period of significant investment followed, with renewal of machinery and modernization of production lines.

In 2011, the Pramet manufacturing facility in Šumperk achieved a record production output of 22.5 million inserts.

In 2012, restructuring merged Pramet with Safety (FR) and Impero (IT) to form IPS (Impero Pramet Safety) group.

=== Dormer Pramet (2014–present) ===
In early 2014, Dormer Tools and the IPS Group merged. The new company was officially named Dormer Pramet in September 2014.

== Organization ==
The company has production facilities in Europe and South America supported by warehousing and logistics hubs in Europe, North America and Asia.

It is part of the global industrial group Sandvik.

== Products ==
Dormer Pramet's product range focuses on the general engineering sector and can be broadly divided into two: its solid cutting tools program and its indexable tools program.

The global brand used for solid cutting tools is Dormer. Products are also marketed under the affiliate brands of Precision Twist Drill and Union Butterfield in North America. The offer includes:

- Drilling tools, High-Speed Steel and Carbide
- Milling tools, High-Speed Steel and Carbide
- Threading tools, including thread milling cutters and dies, High-Speed Steel and Carbide
- Reamers & countersinks, High-Speed Steel and Carbide
- Ancillary ranges, including solid carbide burrs and cutting lubricants

The global brand used for indexable tools is Pramet. Products are also marketed under the affiliate brands of Safety in France and Impero in Italy. The offer includes:

- Drilling tools, Cemented Carbide
- Milling tools, Cemented Carbide
- Turning tools, Cemented Carbide
- Parting and grooving tools, Cemented Carbide
- Boring tools, Cemented Carbide
- Tooling Systems
- Special tools

Dormer Pramet also offer specific tooling for the heavy engineering and rail industries. This includes tools to support areas such as new wheel set machining, wheel renovation, dynamic rail milling and switches machining.

== Training & Education ==
With over 100 years of industry experience, Dormer Pramet has a long-held reputation for the creation and distribution of a variety of training material. An early example was an information wall-chart, recorded in 1952. This measured 30 x 20inches and was printed on aluminium.

The company has 5 training centers located in Chesterfield (UK), Elgin (USA), Sumperk (Czech Republic), Halmstad (Sweden) and Moscow (Russia).

Dormer Pramet offer a free eLearning package for solid cutting tools, available in 11 languages (English, German, Dutch, French, Spanish, Italian, Portuguese, Chinese, Czech, Russian and Arabic). This covers drilling, milling and threading processes, providing explanations on common terminology, different design features and applications, formulas for calculations used in cutting data (speeds and feeds, metal removal rates, cutting time, etc.) and practical hints and troubleshooting tips.

A similar package for indexable tools in currently in production.

== Quality & Environmental ==
Dormer Pramet has two production facilities in:

- São Paulo, Brazil
- Šumperk, Czechia

All production facilities are certified to ISO 9001 (Quality Management Systems), ISO 14001 (International Standard for Environmental Management Systems) and OHSAS 18001 (Health & Safety certification).
