= Allan Heath =

English cricketer

Personal information
- Full name: Allan Borman Heath
- Born: 19 January 1865; East Woodhay, Hampshire, England
- Died: 21 June 1913 (aged 48); Cullompton, Devon, England
- Batting: Right-handed
- Bowling: Right-arm fast-medium

Domestic team information
- Years: Team
- 1883–1885: Hampshire

Career statistics
Competition	First-class
Matches	7
Runs scored	132
Batting average	9.42
100s/50s	–/–
Top score	42
Balls bowled	45
Wickets	2
Bowling average	14.00
5 wickets in innings	–
10 wickets in match	–
Best bowling	2/28
Catches/stumpings	2/–
- Source: Cricinfo, 12 January 2010

Allan Borman Heath (1 January 1865 — 21 June 1913) was an English first-class cricketer.

The son of Allan Borman Heath senior, he was born at Faccombe Manor near Andover, Hampshire on New Year's Day in 1865. He was educated at Cheltenham College, where he played both cricket and football for the college. Whilst still studying at Cheltenham, Heath made his debut in first-class cricket for Hampshire against Somerset at Taunton in 1883. He made a further six first-class appearances for Hampshire to 1885, with his first-class career coming to an end when Hampshire lost first-class status at the end of the 1885 season. In his seven first-class appearances for Hampshire, he scored 132 runs at an average of 9.42, with a highest score of 42. He also took two wickets with his right-arm fast-medium bowling. Following the loss of Hampshire's first-class status, Heath continued to play for the county in second-class county cricket until 1892.

In his later years, Heath struggled with mental health. He died a suicide on 21 June 1913 by jumping in front of a train pulling into Cullompton railway station in Devon, having suffered a mental breakdown.
