= Chris Sandbach =

English cricketer (born 1985)

Personal information
- Full name: Christopher James Lister Sandbach
- Born: 17 October 1985 (age 41); Oxford, Oxfordshire, England
- Height: 6 ft 4 in (1.93 m)
- Batting: Right-handed
- Bowling: Leg break

Domestic team information
- Years: Team
- 2006–2010: Oxfordshire
- 2007: Oxford UCCE/MCCU

Career statistics
Competition	First-class
Matches	2
Runs scored	14
Batting average	3.50
100s/50s	–/–
Top score	8
Balls bowled	74
Wickets	1
Bowling average	81.00
5 wickets in innings	–
10 wickets in match	–
Best bowling	1/37
Catches/stumpings	2/–
- Source: Cricinfo, 24 June 2019

Christopher James Lister Sandbach (born 17 November 1985) is an English former first-class cricketer.

Sandbach was born at Oxford in November 1985. He was educated at Cheltenham College, before going up to Oxford Brookes University. While studying at Oxford Brookes he played first-class cricket for Oxford UCCEin 2007, making two appearances against Glamorgan and Leicestershire. In addition to playing first-class cricket, Sandbach also played minor counties cricket for Oxfordshire between 2006–10, making sixteen appearances in the Minor Counties Championship and eleven appearances in the MCCA Knockout Trophy.
