= Thomas Bramwell =

English cricketer and solicitor

Personal information
- Full name: Thomas Young Bramwell
- Born: 15 October 1850; North Shields, Northumberland, England
- Died: 23 April 1924 (aged 73); Wetheral, Cumberland, England
- Batting: Unknown

Domestic team information
- Years: Team
- 1875: Marylebone Cricket Club

Career statistics
Competition	First-class
Matches	1
Runs scored	44
Batting average	22.00
100s/50s	–/–
Top score	44
Catches/stumpings	–/–
- Source: Cricinfo, 9 September 2021

Thomas Young Bramwell (15 October 1850 — 23 April 1924) was an English first-class cricketer and solicitor.

The son of the surgeon John Byron Bramwell, he was born at North Shields in October 1850. He was educated at Cheltenham College, where he was in both the cricket and football eleven's. After leaving Cheltenham, he pursued a career as a solicitor and was admitted to practice in 1874. Bramwell made a single appearance in first-class cricket for the Marylebone Cricket Club (MCC) against Yorkshire at Scarborough in 1875. Batting twice in the match, he was dismissed for 44 runs in the MCC first innings by Tom Emmett, while in their second innings he was dismissed without scoring by Allen Hill. He was married to Isabella, with whom he had a son, Edward, who was killed in the Second Boer War. Bramwell died in April 1924 at Wetheral, Cumberland. His brother was the neurosurgeon Byrom Bramwell.
