= SAF 2507 =

SAF 2507, is a Alleima-owned trademark (Formerly Sandvik Materials Technology) for a 25Cr duplex (ferritic-austenitic) stainless steel. The nominal chemical composition of SAF 2507 is 25% chromium, 7% nickel, 4% molybdenum and other alloying elements such as nitrogen and manganese. The UNS designation for SAF 2507 is S32750 and the EN steel no. is 1.4410. SAF derives from Sandvik Austenite Ferrite.

Typical properties of SAF 2507 duplex stainless steel are:

- excellent resistance to stress corrosion cracking in chloride-bearing environments
- excellent resistance to pitting corrosion and crevice corrosion
- high resistance to general corrosion
- very high mechanical strength
- physical properties that offer design advantages
- high resistance to erosion corrosion and corrosion fatigue
- good weldability

== See also ==
- Duplex Stainless Steel
