= Steve Lansdown =

English-born Guernsey billionaire (born 1952)

- Born: Stephen Philip Lansdown; 30 August 1952 (age 73); Bristol, England
- Education: Thornbury Grammar School
- Known for: Owner of Bristol City, Bristol Bears and Bristol Flyers
- Children: 2
- Honours: Commander of the Order of the British Empire (2017)

Stephen Philip Lansdown CBE (born 30 August 1952) is an English-born Guernsey billionaire. He co-founded the British financial services firm Hargreaves Lansdown with Peter Hargreaves. He is a founder of Bristol Sport and majority shareholder of Bristol Bears, Bristol Flyers, and Bristol City Football Club.

According to The Sunday Times Rich List in 2019, Lansdown is worth £1.72 billion.

== Career ==
Educated at Thornbury Grammar School in Gloucestershire and trained as an accountant, Lansdown started Hargreaves Lansdown trading from a bedroom in 1981.

During the 2008-09 Premiership Rugby season he began bankrolling Bristol Bears rugby club, then known as Bristol Rugby, when it looked to be going out of business.

In April 2009, he sold a stake of 4.7% in Hargreaves Lansdown for a sum of £47.2million, which he put towards the cost of building Bristol City's new football stadium.

According to Hargeaves Lansdown's notifiable director deals, on 7 October 2010 he sold (at 429.00p) 13,560,843.00 shares at a value of £58,176,016.47.

In 2012 he formalised his ownership of Bristol Rugby.

In 2013, he also bought basketball club Bristol Flyers. As of September 2015 his net worth was reported to be down to $1.88 billion.

Lansdown sold 2.2% of his shares in Hargreaves Lansdown in April 2020 at a total value of £160 million, which reduced his stake in the firm to 7%.

In 2017, Bristol Rugby made New Zealand rugby international Charles Piutau the highest paid player in the history of the Premiership on a reported £1million per season contract facilitated by Lansdown.

In 2018, under his ownership, Bristol Rugby moved their official home ground from the Memorial Ground to the home of Bristol City, Ashton Gate, and officially renamed the team to Bristol Bears. The following season they won their first piece of silverware since returning to the top flight of English rugby defeating Toulon 32-19 to win the European Rugby Challenge Cup.

In August 2020 it was announced that Lansdown would receive £18.6 million in dividends after Hargreaves Lansdown's profits increased by 24% to £378.3 million in the 12 months leading up to 30 June 2020.

In December 2024, Bristol Bears Women, also owned by Lansdown as part of Bristol Bears, signed Ilona Maher, the most followed rugby union player on social media in the history of the sport on an initial 3-month deal.

== Honours ==
Lansdown was appointed Commander of the Order of the British Empire (CBE) in the 2017 Birthday Honours for services to business and the community in Bristol.

== Family ==
He is married with two children.
