= Cheltonian Society =

The Cheltonian Society is an organization which coordinates the activity of Old Cheltonians (O.C.), former pupils of Cheltenham College, a public school in Cheltenham, Gloucestershire, England. The Cheltonian Society is an all-inclusive organisation for everyone who has an association with College or The Prep.

== Service ==
Fourteen Old Cheltonians have won the Victoria Cross. One has won the George Cross. Many have served with distinction and at high ranks in the armed forces, government and various walks of public life. (See the Cheltenham College page for details.)
