= Hargreaves Lansdown =

British financial service company

Hargreaves Lansdown Limited

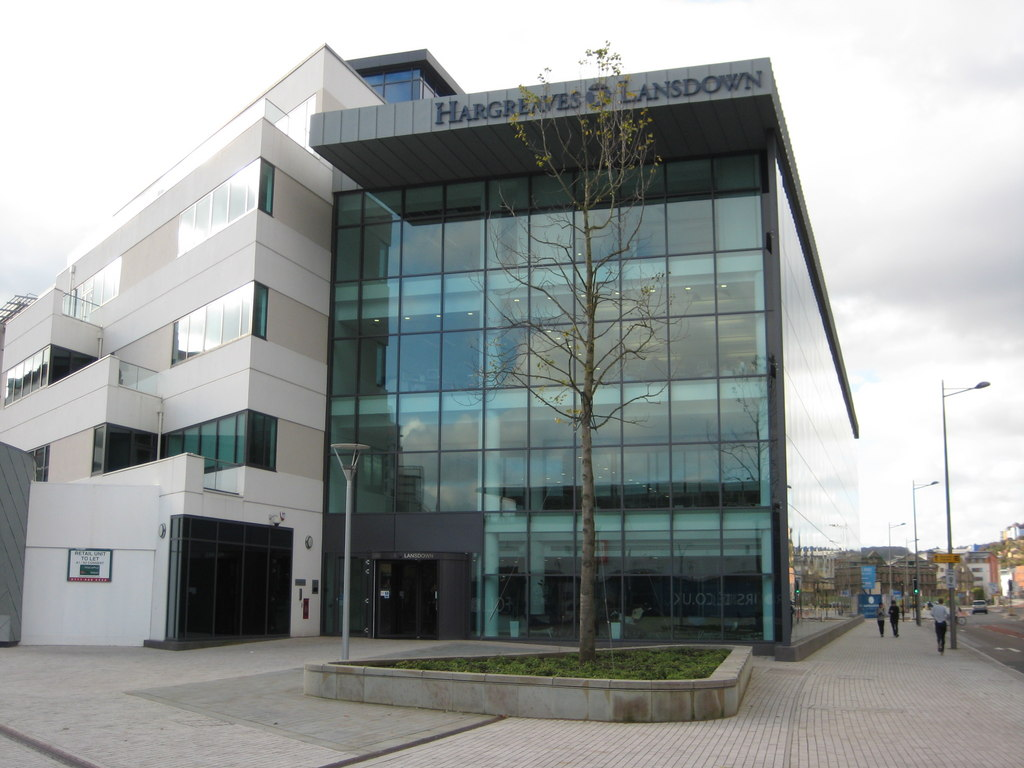
- Hargreaves Lansdown head office at One College Square, Bristol
- Type: Private
- Traded as: LSE: HL. (2007–2025)
- Industry: Financial services
- Founded: 1 July 1981; 45 years ago
- Founders: Peter Hargreaves; Stephen Lansdown
- Headquarters: Bristol, England, UK
- Key people: Chris Hill (CEO); Dan Olley (chief executive)
- Products: ISA, SIPP, Savings account, Annuities, Income drawdown
- Revenue: ▲£764.9 million (2024)
- Operating income: ▼£366.7 million (2024)
- Net income: ▼£293.2 million (2024)
- Total assets: ▲£1,499.2 million (2024)
- Total equity: ▲£815.1 million (2024)
- Owners: CVC Capital Partners; Nordic Capital; Abu Dhabi Investment Authority
- Number of employees: 2,547 (2024)
- Website: hl.co.uk

Hargreaves Lansdown Limited is a British financial services company based in Bristol, England. It is the largest retail investment site in the UK. The company was listed on the London Stock Exchange until it was acquired by CVC Capital Partners, Nordic Capital and the Abu Dhabi Investment Authority in March 2025. The company is one of the United Kingdom’s leading financial services firms and among the country’s largest asset and wealth management providers.

== History ==
=== Early development ===
The company was founded on 1 July 1981 by Peter Hargreaves and Stephen Lansdown who had initially traded from a bedroom. Hargreaves Lansdown initially provided information to clients on unit trusts and tax planning matters. The company grew to be one of the largest in Bristol, headquartered at One College Square in the regenerated Canon's Marsh area.

The company was first listed on the London Stock Exchange on 15 May 2007, in a floatation described as "heavily oversubscribed", which led to the combined stakes of the company's two founders reducing from 80 per cent to 60 per cent of the business.

In April 2009, Stephen Lansdown sold a stake of 4.7 per cent for a sum of £47.2 million to put towards the cost of building Bristol City F.C.'s new stadium, reducing his stake to 22.9 per cent.

The company became a constituent of the FTSE 100 Index in March 2011. It was briefly relegated from the index between November 2023 and May 2024, before leaving the index upon delisting in March 2025.

=== Woodford Investment Management ===
In 2019, Hargreaves Lansdown suffered reputational damage when trading was suspended in Woodford Investment Management's Woodford Equity Income Fund (WEIF), which Hargreaves Lansdown had been promoting through its Wealth 50 list despite concerns about the fund's investment strategy and underperformance. In October 2019, retired founder Peter Hargreaves, still the owner of 32% of Hargreaves Lansdown, was reported to say:

It’s annoyed the hell out of me that it would appear he [Neil Woodford] has not been truthful with Hargreaves Lansdown. But it’s also annoyed me that they [Hargreaves Lansdown] let it go on so long ... The clients have been stuffed in this horrible Woodford fund.

Of some 300,000 people who had invested in the WEIF, 130,000 invested through Hargreaves Lansdown. In October 2022, claims firm RGL filed a High Court claim on behalf of an initial 3,200 investors against Hargreaves Lansdown. By November 2024, RGL said the number of people suing Hargreaves Lansdown had almost doubled in two years, to over 5,000, and could reach 10,000 by March 2025. Hargreaves Lansdown had rejected the first set of RGL claims in 2022 "for lack of a substantive basis of claim".

=== Leadership changes ===
In October 2022, the company's chief executive Chris Hill departed from the business. In December 2022, Dan Olley was appointed as the company's chief executive. Upon appointment, Olley ceased his role as a non-executive director on the company's board, which he had been since 2019.

In July 2023, the chair, Deanna Oppenheimer, stepped down following criticism from the company's co-founder Peter Hargreaves over rising costs and a falling share price.

=== Acquisition ===
In August 2024, the company's board agreed to an acquisition by CVC Capital Partners, Nordic Capital and the Abu Dhabi Investment Authority in a deal that valued the business at £5.4 billion. As part of the deal, shares would be valued at £11.40; the company would delist from the London Stock Exchange upon completion of the deal. The deal was backed by founders Peter Hargreaves and Stephen Lansdown. Hargreaves announced he would sell half of his 20 per cent shareholding, rolling over the rest into the future private company. Lansdown intended to sell all of his 6 per cent shareholding. In October 2024, 87 per cent of the company's shareholders voted in favour of the deal. The court approved the transaction on 19 March 2025, so allowing it to proceed to completion.

=== Post acquisition ===
In April 2025, Peter Hargreaves nominated himself as a non-executive board member. He retains a 14 per cent shareholding in the company, which gives him the power to nominate a director to the board.

In October 2025, Peter Hargreaves stepped down from the company's board and nominated his son, Robert Hargreaves, as his replacement.

In January 2026, Hargreaves Lansdown announced the appointment of Matt Benchener as its new chief executive, who will join the company in March and assume the role from July.

Its office is to move within Bristol in 2026 and staff will be required to attend the office three days a week from the start of 2027.

== Operations ==
The HL platform enables investors to hold different types of investment together in one place with one valuation and dealing service. Available products include ISA, SIPP, Savings accounts and a Fund & Share dealing account. The company also operates multi-manager unit trusts each of which in turn own a share in a number of underlying funds, as well as its own internally managed equity funds under the HL Select brand. The group also provides financial advisory, stockbroking and annuity broking services to private investors and advice to companies on group pension schemes.

Hargreaves Lansdown is UK's largest direct-to-investor investment platform. In August 2024 it had almost 1.9 million customers and oversaw assets worth £155 billion.
