= Nordic Capital =

Private equity firm

- Type: Private
- Industry: Private Equity
- Founded: 1989; 37 years ago
- Products: Private equity funds, Buyouts
- AUM: $50 billion (2026)
- Website: nordiccapital.com

Nordic Capital is a global, sector-specialist private equity firm focused on leveraged buyouts of established companies in Northern Europe and North America.

Founded in 1989, the firm manages about $50 billion of capital, with offices in Copenhagen, Frankfurt, Helsinki, Jersey, London, Luxembourg, New York, Oslo, Stockholm and Seoul.

Nordic Capital targets buyouts of large-cap and upper mid-market companies across four core industries: Technology & Payments, Healthcare, Financial Services, and Services & Industrial Technology.

In 2023, Nordic Capital was one of the 25 largest private equity firms worldwide according to Private Equity International's PEI 300 ranking, with over $30 billion of capital raised within a 5-year period.

In October 2022, Nordic Capital announced the successful closing of its 11th large-cap buyout fund at its hard cap of €9 billion ($11 billion), exceeding its €8 billion target. The fund was more than 45% larger than its predecessor large-cap fund (Nordic Capital Fund X), which raised €6.1 billion in 2020. The fund closed in nine months amidst some of the most challenging fundraising conditions in private equity history, and was the largest Europe-based private equity fund raised that year.

In December 2024, Nordic Capital announced the first and final close of its second mid-market fund, Evolution II, at its hard cap of €2 billion. The fund closed four months after launch and exceeded its initial target of €1.4 billion. Evolution II is approximately 65% larger than its predecessor, Evolution I, and is focused on mid-market investments in Northern Europe.

As of December 2024, Nordic Capital portfolio companies have generated a 17% annual average EBITDA growth since inception.

In February 2025, Nordic Capital won two awards at the Private Equity Wire Europe Awards 2025.

== Recent activity ==
In July 2026, Nordic Capital completed the sale of US-based ArisGlobal to Dassault Systemes for $2 billion.

In October 2025, Nordic Capital completed the sale of US-based Clario for $9.4 billion to Thermo Fisher Scientific. The transaction represents the largest full healthcare private equity exit announced globally in 2025.

In September 2025, Nordic Capital-backed NOBA Bank Group was listed on the Nasdaq Stockholm stock exchange following an initial public offering, with a market capitalisation of around SEK 35 billion at the IPO price.

In July 2025, Nordic Capital acquired Arcadia, a US-based healthcare software company.

In March 2025, Nordic Capital completed the $7 billion take-private of UK-based Hargreaves Lansdown (LON: HL) alongside CVC Capital Partners and ADIA.

In February 2025, Nordic Capital acquired US-based IP management software company Anaqua for approximately $3 billion.

In November 2024, Nordic Capital IX initially invested in Max Matthiessen in 2020. In November 2024, a joint acquisition by Ontario Teachers’ Pension Plan (“Ontario Teachers’”), a major global institutional investor, and Nordic Capital XI was announced to drive further growth and expansion of the company. The transaction was completed in April 2025.

== Investment funds ==
The following investment funds are listed at Nordic Capital's website:

- 2024 – Nordic Capital Evolution II ($2.3 billion)
- 2022 – Nordic Capital XI ($11 billion)
- 2021 – Nordic Capital Evolution I ($1.4 billion)
- 2020 – Nordic Capital X ($7 billion)
- 2018 – Nordic Capital IX ($5 billion)
- 2013 – Nordic Capital VIII ($4 billion)

== Select exited investments ==
- Clario, clinical trial technology company. First invested in by Nordic Capital in 2016, reinvested alongside Astorg in 2020, and divested in 2025 through a sale to Thermo Fisher Scientific.
- NOBA Bank Group, specialist bank group. Backed by Nordic Capital and listed on Nasdaq Stockholm in 2025, marking a partial exit through an initial public offering.
- Sunrise Medical, rehab mobility solutions provider. Acquired by Nordic Capital in 2015 and divested in 2024 through a sale to Platinum Equity.
- Macrobond, a global provider of software and macroeconomic and financial data. Acquired by Nordic Capital in 2018 and divested in 2023 through a sale to Francisco Partners.
- The Binding Site, specialty diagnostics company. Acquired by Nordic Capital in 2011 and divested in 2022 through a sale to Thermo Fisher Scientific.
- Nordnet, Nordic digital savings and investment platform. Backed by Nordic Capital and listed on Nasdaq Stockholm in 2020 through an initial public offering.
- Nycomed, pharmaceutical company acquired by Nordic Capital in 2005 for $2 billion, and sold to Takeda for $14 billion in 2011. The deal was the largest private equity exit of the year, and one of the most profitable private equity deals ever. Nordic Capital was later award "Exit of the Year", as well as "Deal of the Last 20 Years" in the Financial News 20th Anniversary Awards.
- Bambora, payment solution and services. Built on a platform acquired in 2014, and divested 2017 through a sale to Ingenico.
- Thule, leisure outdoor industry. Acquired in 2007, listed in 2014, final holding divested in 2016.
- Permobil, powered wheelchair manufacturer. Acquired in 2006 and divested in 2013 to Investor.
