= Sandvik =

Swedish engineering company

Sandvik AB
- Type: Publicly traded aktiebolag
- Traded as: Nasdaq Stockholm: SAND; OMXS30 component
- ISIN: SE0000667891; US8002122013
- Industry: Engineering
- Founded: 1862; 164 years ago
- Founder: Göran Fredrik Göransson
- Headquarters: Stockholm, Sweden
- Key people: Johan Molin (Chairman of the Board); Stefan Widing (President and CEO)
- Products: Equipment and systems for mining, excavation, drilling, rock processing, metal cutting and machining
- Revenue: ▼122.878 billion kr (2024)
- Operating income: ▼18.420 billion kr (2024)
- Net income: ▼12.245 billion kr
- Total assets: ▲184.384 billion kr (2024)
- Total equity: ▲96.999 billion kr (2024)
- Number of employees: 41,447 (full-time equivalent) (2024)
- Website: home.sandvik

Sandvik AB is a Swedish multinational engineering company specializing in products and services for mining, rock excavation, rock drilling, rock processing (crushing and screening), metal cutting and machining. The company was founded in Gävleborg County, Sweden, in 1862. In 2024, it had approximately 41,000 employees and a revenue of 123 billion SEK, with sales in around 150 countries.

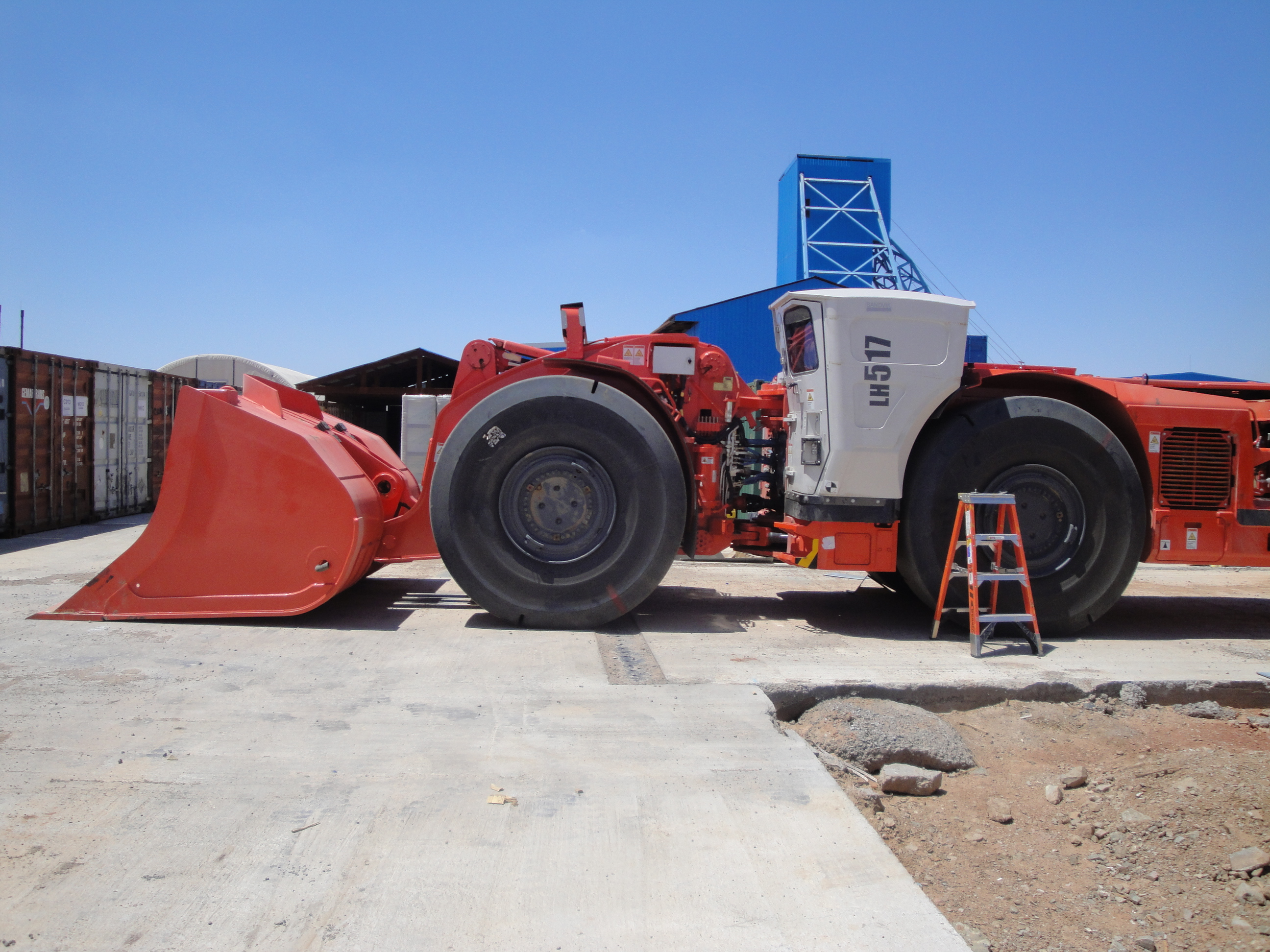
LH 517 loader from Sandvik

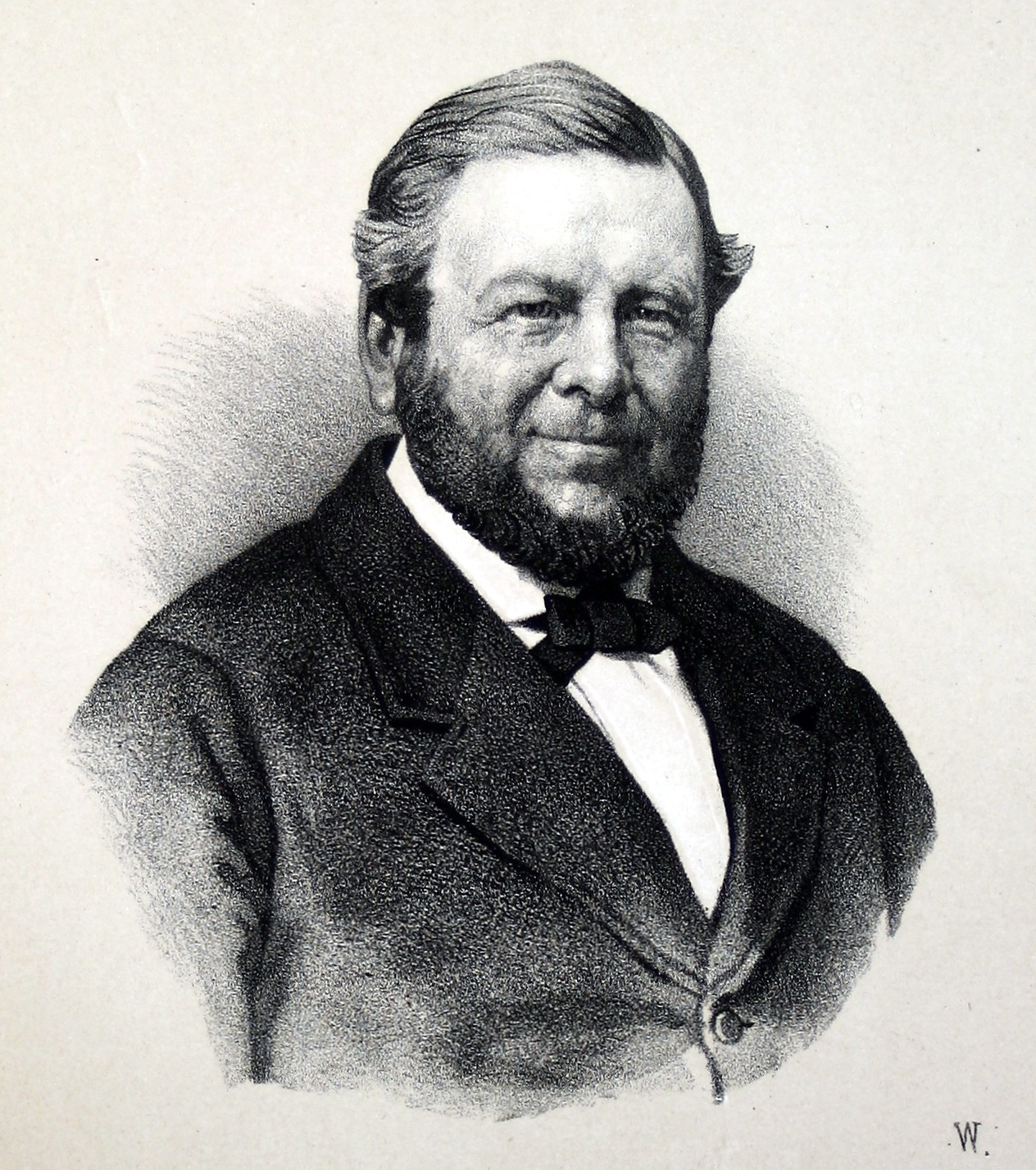
Göran Fredrik Göransson, founder of Sandvik

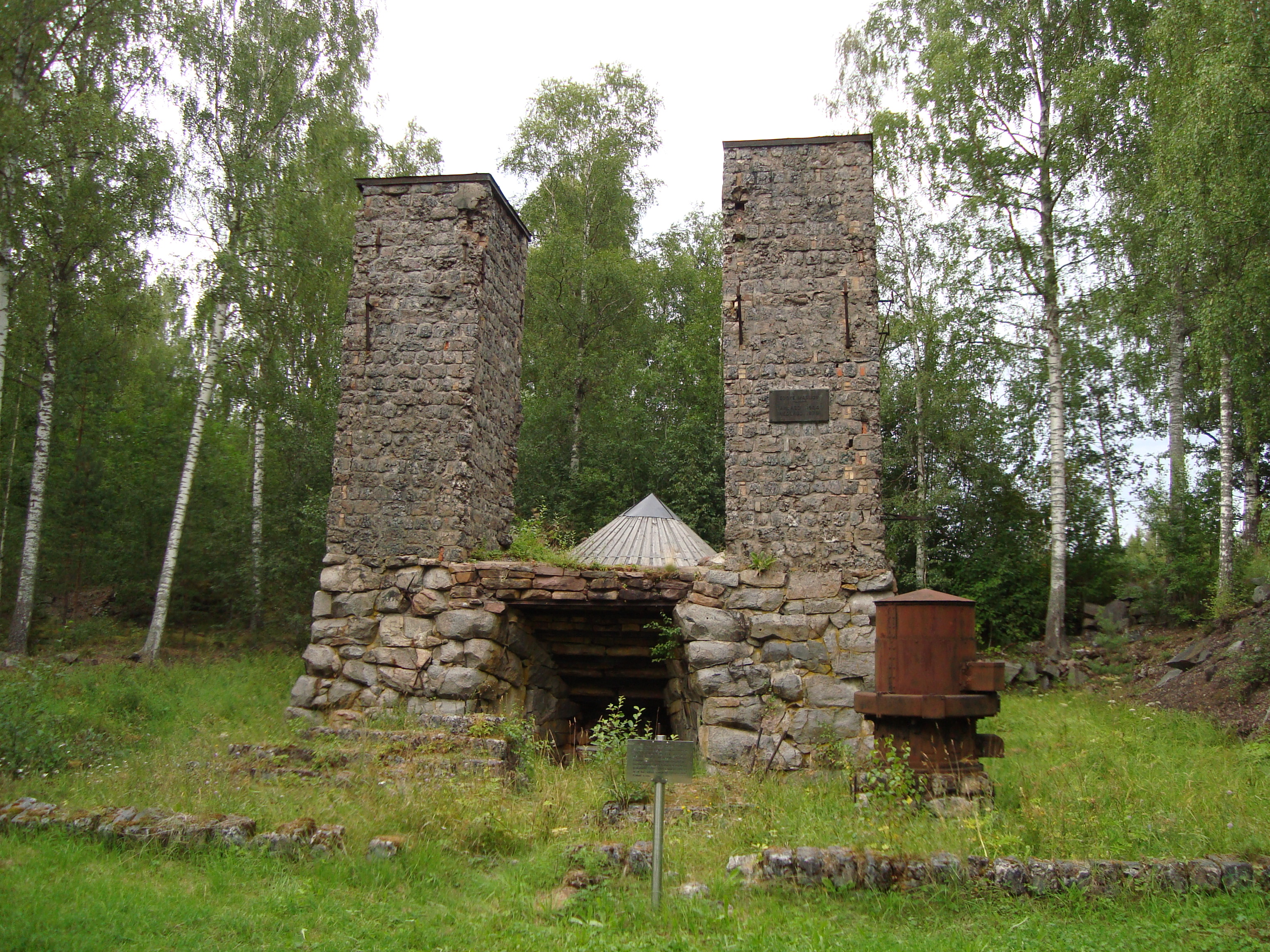
Ruins of the blast furnace at Edsken, Hofors Municipality, with a half-size replica of a Bessemer converter

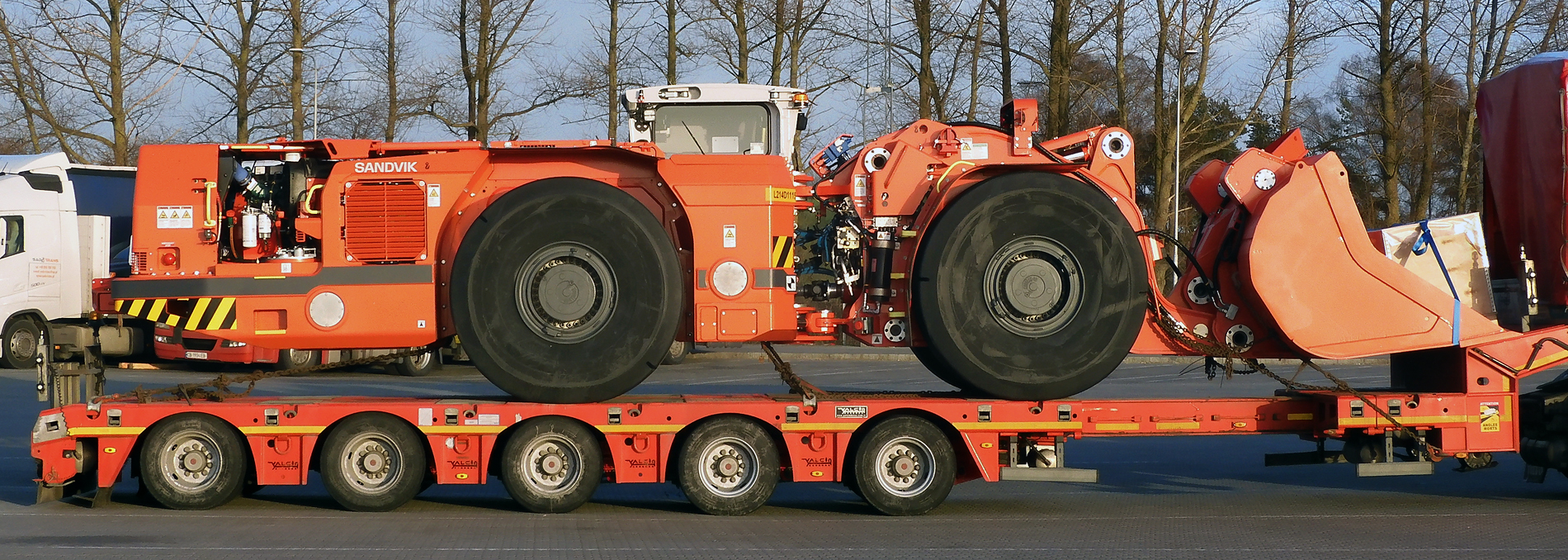
LH 514 loader from Sandvik

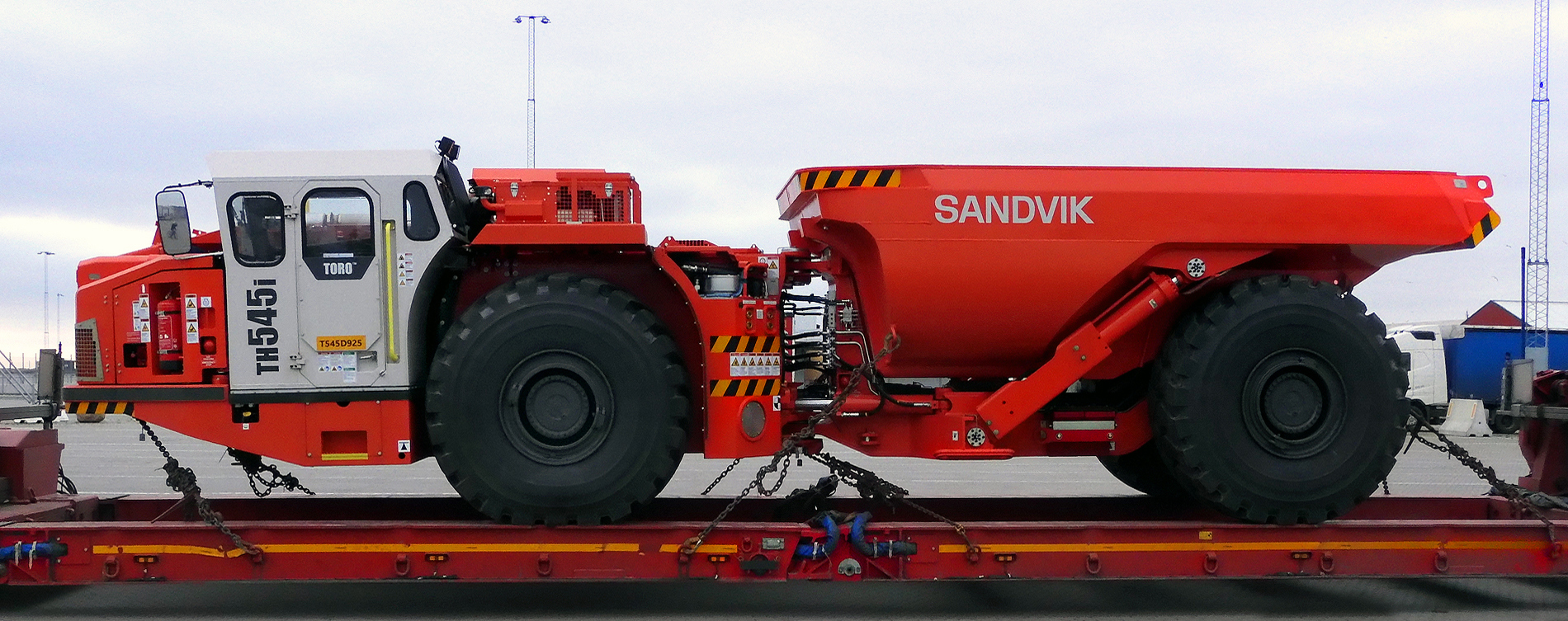
TH 545i dump truck from Sandvik

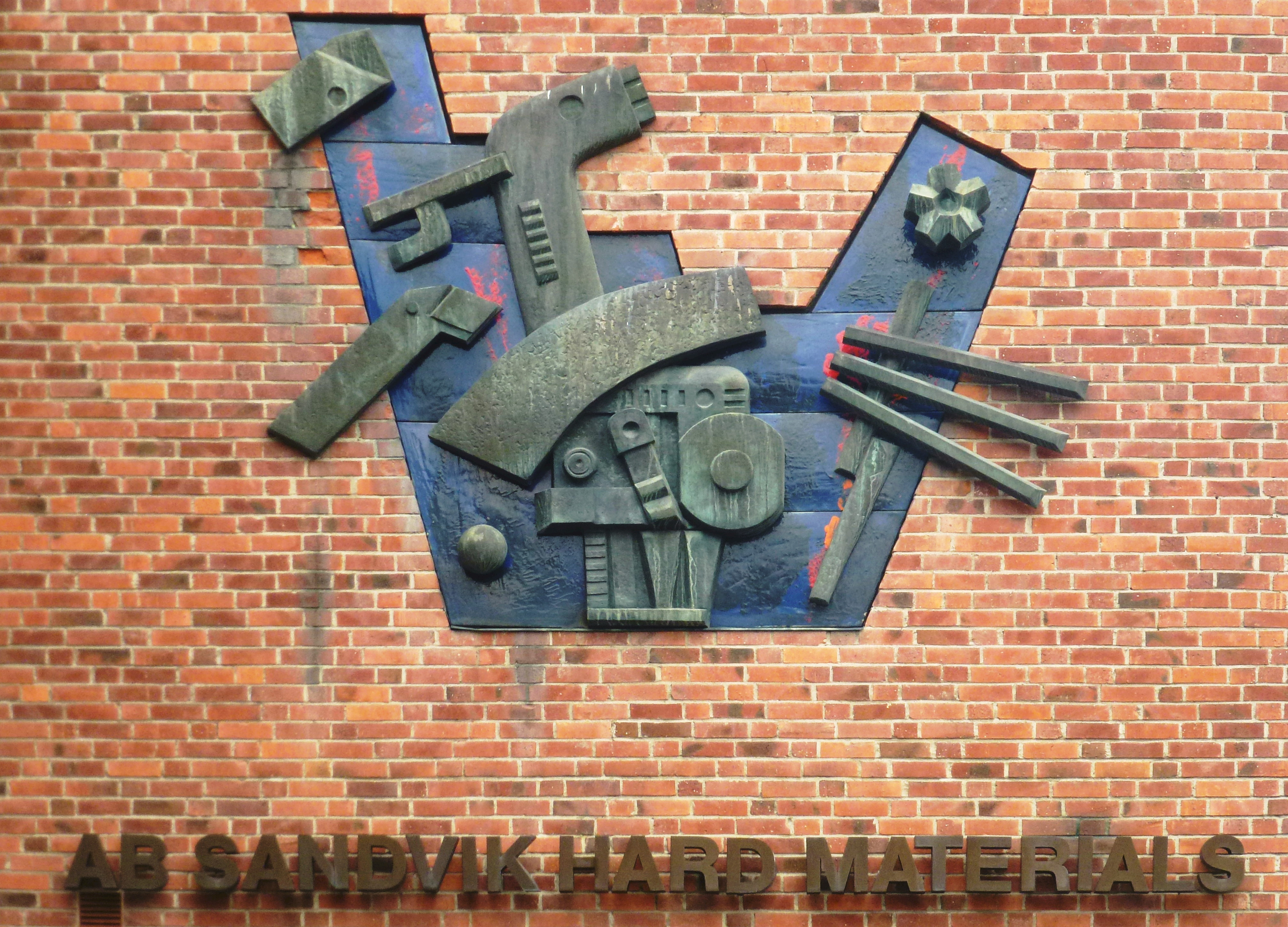
"AB Sandvik Hard Materials", wall sculpture on Sandvik's property in Västberga industrial area

== History ==
=== 1800s ===
The company was founded by Göran Fredrik Göransson, who was an early user of the Bessemer process. In 1857, he acquired rights to use the patented process and initially applied it in a blast furnace at Edsken, Hofors Municipality. There, he became the first user of the process to achieve technically and commercially acceptable results. However, production at sufficient scale was not possible in the initial location. This prompted the foundation, in 1862, of a new company, Högbo Stål & Jernverks AB, in a place that developed into the town of Sandviken.

Already in the 1860s, the company was exporting its products. The United Kingdom, Germany, France and Russia were important markets. In 1868, the company was reorganized as Sandvikens Jernverks AB (the Sandviken Ironworks). The Sandvik brand name was first used by the company at the Centennial International Exhibition of 1876 in Philadelphia. The following year, sales to the United States began.

In 1889, the company became the first Swedish manufacturer of seamless rolled tubes, and over the following decade, it made substantial investments in methodology development and production facilities for seamless tubes.

=== 1900–1980 ===
Sandvikens Jernverk was listed on the Stockholm Stock Exchange in 1901.

In 1907, production of hollow rock drill steels began, and by the 1920s, the company was considered internationally leading in that product area.

In 1914, the company established its first sales subsidiary outside of Sweden, in Birmingham, UK. Further foreign subsidiaries were opened 1919 in the United States, 1923 in France, and 1926 in Canada.

In the 1920s, the company began melting stainless steel, and in 1924, it started producing its first stainless seamless tubes. In 1932, it acquired a license to use a new method for cold-rolling tubes, called pilgering, and in 1934, it became the first European company to use the method at industrial scale.

In 1937, there were subsidiaries in 37 countries.

World War II forced the company to reorganize production. Exports were halved, but demand from the Swedish military for grenades prevented a corporate crisis.

Already before the war, the company had wanted to enter the cemented carbide tool market, but the patent situation was complicated, and it was unable to find a suitable business partner. However, in 1942, it entered into an agreement with the Lumalampan subsidiary of Kooperativa Förbundet. Lumalampan mainly produced tungsten light bulbs but also made tungsten carbide tips for grenades, as well as its own carbide tools for filament wire drawing, and thus possessed the required technology. In the same year, the Sandvik Coromant brand was registered for cemented carbide products, and the company started working on tools for metal cutting and rock drilling. Metal cutting tools were successfully produced beginning in 1943, but it took several more years to develop sufficiently durable rock drilling tools.

Bessemer steel production was discontinued in Sandviken in 1947. In the same year, the company became the exclusive supplier of cemented carbide rock drill steels to Atlas Diesel (later known as Atlas Copco).

In the 1950s, the company expanded its cemented carbide production capacity by building factories in new locations. A workshop that was opened in the small town of Gimo in 1951 gradually expanded into a major production facility, and in 1953, a factory was opened in the Västberga district of Stockholm. By then, rock drills had emerged as the most important cemented carbide product area for the company.

In 1967, Sandvikens Jernverk had 40 subsidiaries and sales in 100 countries. The company changed its name to Sandvik AB in 1972.

In 1979, Sandvik acquired the British company Osprey.

Steel conveyor belts of various types had been part of the product range since 1902, and in 1980, a conveyor-belt-based system called Rotoform for granulation of liquid chemicals was developed.

=== 1980–2000 ===
In 1980, profits began to fall, and over the following years, there were personnel reductions, restructuring efforts and divestments. Still, in 1983, the company recorded its first loss in 62 years. In 1984, the organization was made more decentralized.

In 1989, Sandvik began investing in Eastern Europe.

In 1994, production at industrial scale of diamond-coated carbide cutting inserts began. In 1996, a new stainless steel called Safurex was developed.

In 1997, Sandvik acquired a majority of the Swedish company Kanthal AB, which specialized in metallic electrical resistance products and high-temperature ceramic materials. Also, in the same year, Sandvik bought all remaining shares in the Finnish company Tamrock, a manufacturer of mining equipment in which it previously had a minority holding.

In 1999, Sandvik divested its production of saws and other craft tools.

=== 2000 to present ===
In 2001, Sandvik started testing a new system named Automine for automation and remote control of mining equipment in mines in Canada and Sweden.

In 2002, Sandvik acquired a majority position in the German cutting tool manufacturer Walter AG.

In 2004, the Kanthal division developed new alloy production methods with high-temperature powder metallurgy.

In 2009, Sandvik bought the Austrian company Wolfram Bergbau, which was focused on tungsten production, from mining to cemented-carbide powder.

In 2017, Sandvik divested its Process Systems and Mining Systems operations, both of which were related to conveyor technology.

In 2022, Sandvik bought the Australian mine planning software provider Deswik.

In August 2022, the business area Sandvik materials technology, which included tubes, strip steel, medical wires and Kanthal-brand heating technology products, was spun off as a separate company, publicly listed at Nasdaq Stockholm. The new company was named Alleima, and its shares were distributed to the shareholders of Sandvik.

In August 2023, Sandvik announced it had acquired the Cambridge, Ontario-headquartered software development company, Postability.

In September 2023, Sandvik adopted a revised visual identity, with a new logotype that contains different graphical elements than the previous one.

== Operations ==
Sandvik divides its operations into three business areas, Mining and rock solutions, accounting for 51 percent of revenues in 2024, Rock processing solutions, accounting for 9 percent, and Manufacturing and machining solutions, accounting for 40 percent.

=== Mining and rock solutions ===
The mining and rock solutions business area provides vehicles for loading and hauling minerals, equipment for drilling, cutting and other rock excavation tasks, as well as supporting services and infrastructure like digital monitoring and automation systems.

Sandvik is notable for developing battery-powered, remotely monitored and automated equipment. The vehicle TH665B, with a capacity of 65 metric tons, was the highest-capacity battery-electric underground mining truck in the world when it was launched in 2022. Besides the advantage of not producing any diesel exhaust gases, battery-powered trucks emit less heat than diesel-powered trucks, which is beneficial in underground mines, and tend to achieve higher uphill top speeds. Sandvik has developed systems for swapping battery packs of mining trucks and loaders to freshly charged ones, instead of charging the batteries while attached to the vehicle. The minimum time required for battery swapping is a few minutes. Rio Tinto, LKAB, Boliden, Torex Gold, Foran Mining, Rana Gruber and Byrnecut are examples of mining companies that have been reported to use battery-electric Sandvik trucks and loaders.

As of 2024, Sandvik operates a working prototype of a fully automatic battery-powered autonomous drill rig in its test mine in Finland. The machine is capable of planning the drill procedure, optimizing its electric power usage, changing drill bits and automatically returning to a charging station when necessary. In addition to the potential for higher productivity, workplace safety is an area where this kind of technology may bring significant improvements.

=== Rock processing solutions ===
The rock processing solutions business area produces mobile and stationary crushing and screening equipment for rock and mineral processing as well as related tools and services.

=== Manufacturing and machining solutions ===
The manufacturing and machining solutions business area produces tools, software and other equipment for metal cutting, additive manufacturing and metrology. Machining tools are sold under several brand names, for example Sandvik Coromant and Dormer Pramet.

In 2023, Sandvik used equipment and software for precision machining and metrology to produce an AI-designed statue simultaneously inspired by the styles of the artists Michelangelo, Auguste Rodin, Käthe Kollwitz, Kōtarō Takamura and Augusta Savage. The statue is made of stainless steel, weighs 500 kg, is 1.5 meters tall and is manufactured to a precision of 0.03 mm. It was exhibited at the Swedish National Museum of Science and Technology.

== See also ==
- List of Swedish companies
