= Cheltenham College =

Public school in Gloucestershire, England

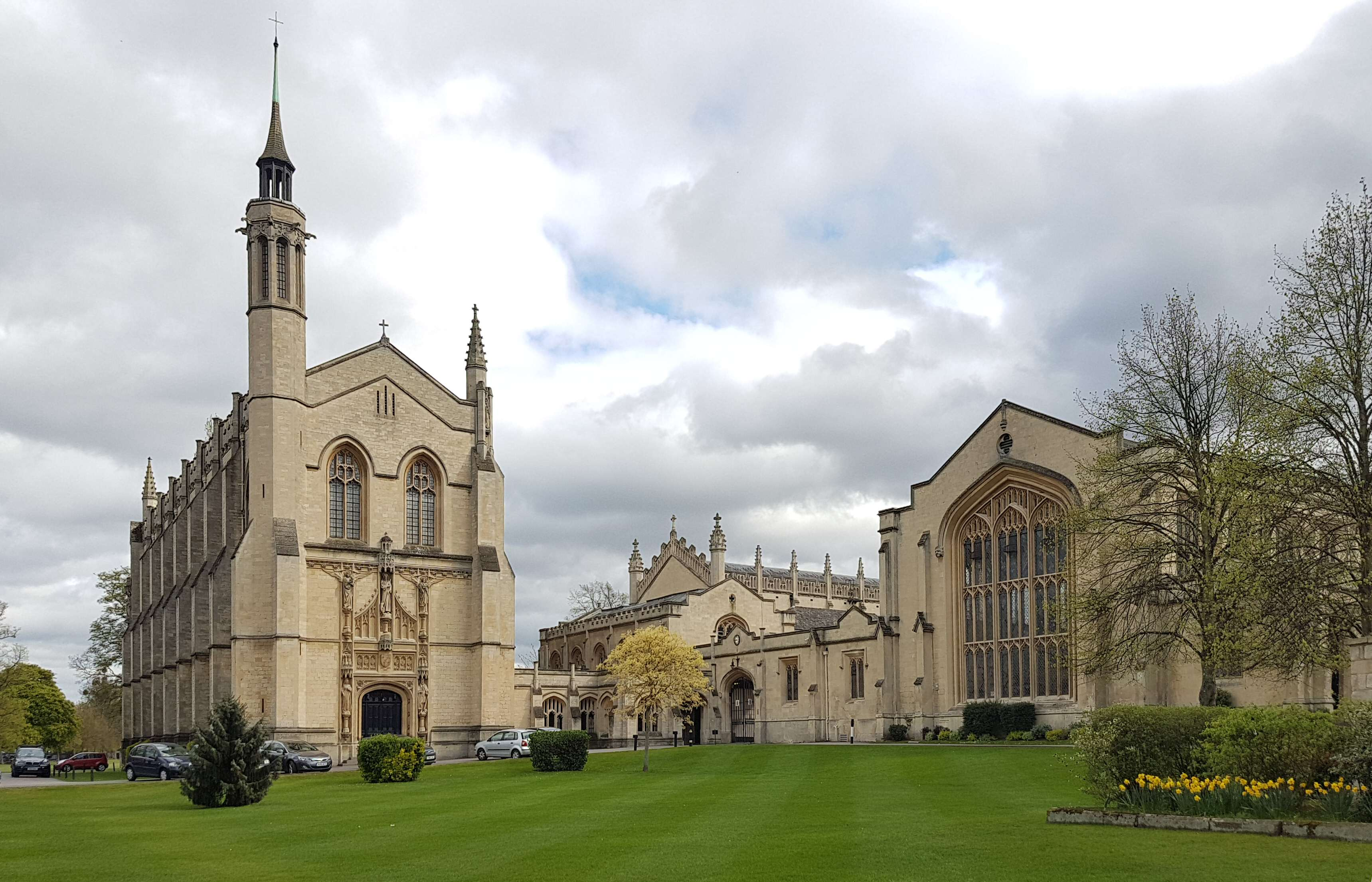
- Cheltenham College Chapel and Library (Big Modern)

Location
- Bath Road; Cheltenham, Gloucestershire, GL53 7LD; England; 51°53′30″N 2°4′30″W

Information
- Type: Public school Private boarding and day school
- Motto: Latin: Labor omnia vincit ("Work Conquers All")
- Religious affiliation: Church of England
- Established: July 1841; 185 years ago
- Founder: G. S. Harcourt, J. S. Iredell
- Local authority: Gloucestershire
- Department for Education URN: 115795 Tables
- Ofsted: Reports
- President of the Council: W. J. Straker-Nesbit
- Head: Chris Townsend
- Staff: 88
- Gender: Co-educational
- Age: 13 to 18
- Enrolment: 750
- Houses: 11
- Colour: Old: Current:
- Alumni: Old Cheltonians (OCs)
- Publication: The Cheltonian & Floreat
- Website: cheltenhamcollege.org

Cheltenham College is a private school with boarding and day school facilities for pupils aged 13–18 in Cheltenham, Gloucestershire, England. The school opened in 1841 as a Church of England foundation and has an enrolment of around 750 pupils.

== History ==
Two Cheltenham residents, G. S. Harcourt and J. S. Iredell, founded the college in July 1841 to educate the sons of gentlemen. The plan to establish a Proprietary Grammar School had been agreed at a meeting of residents at Harcourt's home on 9 November 1840. It originally opened in three houses along Bays Hill Terrace in the centre of the town.

Within two years it had moved to its present site, with Boyne House as the first College Boarding House, and soon became known simply as Cheltenham College. Accepting both boarding and day boys, it was divided into Classical and Military sides until the mid-20th century. The 1893 book Great Public Schools by E. S. Skirving, S. R. James, and Henry Churchill Maxwell Lyte contained a chapter on each of what they considered England's ten greatest public schools; it included a chapter on Cheltenham College. The college is now an independent fee paying school, governed by Cheltenham College Council. A few girls were admitted in 1969. In 1981 the first girls' house opened and the Sixth Form became fully co-educational. In 1998, girls were admitted to all other years.

In 1865, a Junior Department was added to the main College buildings. In 1993 it opened its doors to girls and also opened a pre-Prep department, Kingfishers, for 3- to 7-year-olds.

=== Second World War ===
Around September 1939, the school completely closed, and everyone was transported to Shrewsbury School. The school was requisitioned by the British government, and central government departments were moved to Cheltenham. In November 1939 it was hoped that government departments would move out by May 1940, and that the school could return by the start of the summer term. The junior school was moved to Stowell Park. The school returned in early May 1940. Malvern College, in Worcestershire, was similarly requisitioned by the government in 1939.

The school was accommodated at Doddington Hall, Cheshire, in 250 acres of grounds, and The Cliffe in Hough, Cheshire. Brogyntyn had been offered as accommodation, but Doddington Hall would require less alterations.

== Student body ==
Cheltenham has approximately 720 pupils (a fifth being day pupils) between the ages of 13 and 18. The fees are between approximately £37,000–£50,500 per annum, making it amongst the most expensive schools in the United Kingdom. The school claims to have a strong academic reputation, with the majority of pupils going to The Russell Group Universities, and around 7% going on to Oxford and Cambridge universities. Both GCSE and A Level results are among the highest in Gloucestershire.

Cheltenham College and Cheltenham Prep are home to over 100 international students from over 30 countries. These students all need an Educational Guardian as part of admission.

== Military tradition ==
In the First World War 702 Old Cheltonians (former pupils) were killed in the service of their country, and a further 363 died in World War II. Cheltenham is one of only three schools in England to have its own military colours (last presented in September 2026 by The Princess Royal). (The others are Eton College and the Duke of York's Royal Military School.)

=== Combined Cadet Force (CCF) ===
Cheltenham College has an affiliate tri-service Combined Cadet Force which has a history dating back to 1862.

Cheltenham College CCF (Army Section) is attached to the Rifles Regiment, and consequently Army cadets' berets have the Rifles Bugle as their cap badge.

== Sport ==
=== Rugby ===
The rugby club dates back to 1844. Cheltenham competes with larger single gender schools. The first inter-school rugby football match was played between Rugby School and Cheltenham College, Cheltenham beating Rugby. The "Cheltenham Rules" were adopted by the Rugby Football Union in 1887. Cheltenham's rugby XV was undefeated in the 1957, 2008 and 2017 seasons. Eddie Butler, former Welsh, Barbarian and British Lions international rugby player, taught French at the school. The school's director of rugby is former Gloucester Rugby and England rugby player Olly Morgan.

=== Rowing ===
The Boat Club was founded in 1841. The Boat House itself is located at the foot of Tewkesbury Abbey on the banks of the River Severn. Key events in the rowing calendar are; Schools' Head of the River Race, The National Schools Regatta and Henley Royal Regatta. At the 2013 National School's Head of River, the 1st IV+ came first in their division.

=== Rackets ===
Cheltenham College plays Rackets. At times, they have dominated the Queen's Club Public Schools Competition: Cheltenham have been National Champions three times from 2003 to 2011. Chris Stout won the Foster Cup (the individual championship for public schools) at Queen's Club in December 2011. The current World Champion, Jamie Stout (Chris's brother), is an Old Cheltonian as well.

=== Polo ===
Cheltenham were National Schools Champions in 1997, 1998, 2004, & 2005 and Arena Champions in 2004, 2005, and 2006.

=== Cricket ===
Cheltenham has a longstanding tradition of cricket and is the home of the Cheltenham Cricket Festival. Gloucestershire County Cricket Club played its first game at the College cricket ground in 1872, making this the longest running cricket festival on an out-ground, in the world.

== In popular culture and media ==
Cheltenham College was used to film the majority of the school scenes in the popular 1968 British film If...., starring Malcolm McDowell, although an agreement between the school's then Headmaster, David Ashcroft, and the film's director, Lindsay Anderson (who was a former pupil and Senior Prefect), prevented the filmmakers from crediting the school. Additional interior scenes were filmed at Aldenham School in Hertfordshire, which gained sole accreditation in the film's closing credit.

== Notable alumni ==
See List of Cheltenham College alumni

== Principals, headmasters and head ==
The current head of Cheltenham College is Chris Townsend.

The full list of past principals and heads is contained in Cheltenham College Who's Who 5th edition, 2003, and is as follows:

- Principals (1841–1919)
  - Alfred Phillips, 1841–44
  - William Dobson, 1845–59
  - Henry Highton, 1859–62
  - Alfred Barry, 1862–68
  - Thomas Jex-Blake, 1868–74
  - Herbert Kynaston (born 1835) (né Snow), 1874–88
  - Herbert Armitage James, 1889–95
  - Robert Stuart de Courcy Laffan, 1895–99
  - Reginald Waterfield, 1899–1919
- Headmasters (1919–2019)
  - Henry Harrison Hardy, 1919–32
  - Richard Victor Harley Roseveare 1932–37
  - Arthur Goodhart Pite 1937–38
  - John Bell 1938–40
  - Alan Guy Elliott-Smith 1940–51
  - Guy Pentreath 1952–59
  - David Ashcroft 1959–78
  - Richard Martin Morgan 1978–90
  - Peter David Vaughan Wilkes 1990–97
  - Paul Arthur Chamberlain 1997–2004
  - John Stephen Richardson 2004–2010
  - Alex Peterken 2010–2018
  - Crispin Dawson (acting headmaster – 2018)
- Head (2019– )
  - Nicola Huggett 2019 – 2026
  - Chris Townsend 2026 –
- Heads of the Junior School (1863–2013)
  - Thomas Middlemore Middlemore-Whithard 1863–65
  - Francis Joseph Cade 1896–1910
  - Charles Thornton 1911–23
  - Basil Allcot Bowers 1923–33
  - William Donavan Johnston 1933–46
  - Hugh Alan Clutton-Brock 1946–64
  - William Philip Cathcart Davies 1964–86
  - David John Allenby Cassell 1986–91
  - Nigel Iain Archdale 1992–2008
  - Adrian Morris 2008–2010
  - Scott Bryan 2010–2012
  - Noll Jenkins 2012–2013 (acting head)
- Heads of the preparatory school (2013–present)
  - Jonathan Whybrow 2013–2018
  - Tom O'Sullivan 2018 –

== See also ==
- Cheltonian Society
- College Ground, Cheltenham
- Thirlestaine House
- List of people educated at Cheltenham College
- Cheltenham Ladies' College

== Bibliography ==
- Cheltenham College: The First Hundred Years by Michael C. Morgan [Chalfont St. Giles: Richard Sadler, for the Cheltonian Society, 1968]. A formal history, starting with the meeting on 9 November 1840 of Cheltenham residents (presided over by Major-General George Swiney) who decided to set up a 'Proprietary Grammar School' and appointed a committee to achieve this. ISBN unknown/unavailable.
- Then & Now: An Anniversary Celebration of Cheltenham College 1841–1991 by Tim Pearce, (Cheltonian Society, 1991). The author explains in the Preface that this is "more of a scrap book than a formal history, and like all scrap books it reflects the tastes and interests of its compilers and depends on what in the way of pictures and documents may be available to them". ISBN 0-85967-875-X
- Cheltenham College Who's Who, 5th edition ed. John Bowes, (Cheltonian Society, 2003) No ISBN on book.
- Floreat, A collection of photographs of College life from the 1960s and early 1970s compiled by the late M.F. Miller, a Physics master at the school
