= 2018–19 Elitserien (bandy) =

2018–19 Elitserien season
- League: (Sweden) Elitserien
- Sport: Bandy
- Duration: 19 October 2018 – 12 February 2019 (Regular season); 16 February 2019 – 23 March 2019 (Final stage)
- Teams: 14
- TV partner: SVT

Regular season
- League winners: Villa Lidköping BK

Final
- Champions: Villa Lidköping BK
- Runners-up: Västerås SK

Elitserien seasons
- 2017–18 2019–20

The 2018–19 Elitserien was the twelfth season of the present highest Swedish men's bandy top division, Elitserien.

== Teams ==
Locations of the 2018–19 Elitserien teams

Club	Home town	Home ice
Bollnäs GIF	Bollnäs	Sävstaås IP
Broberg/Söderhamn Bandy	Söderhamn	Hällåsen
Edsbyns IF	Edsbyn	Svenska Fönster Arena*
Falu BS	Falun	Lugnets Isstadion
Frillesås BK	Frillesås	Sjöaremossen
Hammarby IF	Stockholm	Zinkensdamms IP
IFK Motala	Motala	XL-Bygg Arena
Sandvikens AIK	Sandviken	Göransson Arena*
IK Sirius	Uppsala	Studenternas IP
IK Tellus	Stockholm	Zinkensdamms IP
Vetlanda BK	Vetlanda	Sapa Arena*
Villa Lidköping BK	Lidköping	Sparbanken Lidköping Arena*
IFK Vänersborg	Vänersborg	Arena Vänersborg*
Västerås SK	Västerås	ABB Arena Syd*

* – indoor arena

== League table ==
Pos	Team	Pld	W	D	L	GF	GA	GD	Pts	
1	Villa Lidköping BK	26	22	3	1	174	60	+114	47	Advance to Final knock-out stage
2	Västerås SK	26	19	1	6	153	90	+63	39	Advance to Final knock-out stage
3	Sandvikens AIK	26	19	1	6	148	86	+62	39	Advance to Final knock-out stage
4	Edsbyns IF	26	18	0	8	139	78	+61	36	Advance to Final knock-out stage
5	Bollnäs GIF	26	15	5	6	113	89	+24	35	Advance to Final knock-out stage
6	Hammarby IF	26	14	3	9	125	120	+5	31	Advance to Final knock-out stage
7	IFK Vänersborg	26	12	4	10	124	100	+24	28	Advance to Knock-out stage preliminary round
8	Vetlanda BK	26	12	1	13	113	116	−3	25	Advance to Knock-out stage preliminary round
9	IFK Motala	26	7	7	12	79	101	−22	21	Advance to Knock-out stage preliminary round
10	Broberg/Söderhamn IF	26	8	4	14	80	117	−37	20	Advance to Knock-out stage preliminary round
11	IK Sirius	26	9	1	16	105	155	−50	19	
12	Falu BS	26	4	2	20	76	157	−81	10	Qualification to Relegation playoffs
13	Frillesås BK	26	4	1	21	68	146	−78	9	Qualification to Relegation playoffs
14	IK Tellus	26	2	1	23	51	133	−82	5	Relegation to the Allsvenskan

Updated to match(es) played on completed. Source: svenskbandy.se

== Results ==
Teams play each other twice, once at home and once away.

Home \ Away	BGIF	BSIF	EIF	FBS	FBK	HIF	IFKM	IFKV	IKS	IKT	SAIK	VSK	VBK	VLBK
Bollnäs GIF	—	5–2	3–5	9–6	9–2	5–6	3–3	3–2	7–2	6–1	6–8	5–3	5–3	3–1
Broberg/Söderhamn IF	3–3	—	3–2	3–3	4–1	3–6	3–4	5–5	4–3	8–3	2–4	6–5	1–4	2–8
Edsbyns IF	3–5	5–1	—	5–3	8–2	10–1	11–3	5–4	9–4	6–1	3–2	6–3	8–2	2–4
Falu BS	4–9	1–2	3–2	—	4–2	2–7	3–3	0–7	3–4	4–1	3–7	1–7	5–6	3–12
Frillesås BK	2–4	2–2	5–9	3–2	—	2–5	3–0	4–11	4–6	5–2	3–6	0–3	2–4	1–5
Hammarby IF	3–3	6–3	4–6	7–4	6–2	—	6–1	6–3	4–8	6–1	0–6	5–8	7–2	2–7
IFK Motala	0–3	2–1	5–3	8–1	6–2	3–3	—	6–4	2–2	1–3	4–7	1–4	2–4	3–3
IFK Vänersborg	2–2	5–3	1–3	4–1	5–2	5–5	6–4	—	11–1	6–3	6–2	6–5	2–4	2–7
IK Sirius	2–4	4–5	3–7	9–5	9–4	3–5	5–4	7–2	—	5–4	1–6	4–13	2–5	3–10
IK Tellus	2–5	0–4	0–8	2–4	2–3	2–6	2–2	3–4	4–8	—	4–2	2–3	2–6	1–4
Sandvikens AIK	5–4	17–5	4–1	7–1	8–5	5–3	3–3	5–3	5–2	8–2	—	6–4	11–2	2–8
Västerås SK	10–1	5–1	4–3	8–4	11–2	7–5	6–4	8–3	10–2	7–1	5–3	—	5–4	5–5
Vetlanda BK	1–1	5–1	3–7	8–2	8–2	6–8	4–5	3–12	9–1	9–2	3–7	3–4	—	3–8
Villa Lidköping BK	8–0	9–3	5–2	15–4	7–3	13–3	6–0	3–3	9–5	3–1	3–2	7–0	4–2	—

Legend: Blue = home team win; Yellow = draw; Red = away team win.
For upcoming matches, an "a" indicates there is an article about the rivalry between the two participants.

== Top scorers ==
As of end of season.

Rank	Player	Club	Goals
1	(Sweden) Christoffer Edlund	Sandvikens AIK	61
2	(Sweden) Joakim Andersson	Villa Lidköping BK	50
3	(Sweden) Christoffer Fagerström	Hammarby IF	44
4	(Sweden) David Karlsson	Villa Lidköping BK	41
5	(Sweden) Joakim Hedqvist	IFK Vänersborg	37
5	(Sweden) Patrik Nilsson	Bollnäs GIF	37
7	(Sweden) Jonas Edling	Edsbyns IF	29
8	(Sweden) Oscar Wikblad	Edsbyns IF	28
9	(Sweden) Christian Mickelsson	Bollnäs GIF	27
10	(Sweden) Jesper Jonsson	Hammarby IF	26

== Knock-out stage ==
=== Preliminary round ===
Team 1	Agg.	Team 2	1st leg	2nd leg
Broberg/Söderhamn IF	6–7	IFK Vänersborg	2–3	4–4
IFK Motala	11–5	Vetlanda BK	5–2	6–3

==== Broberg/Söderhamn IF vs IFK Vänersborg ====
14 February 2019	Broberg/Söderhamn IF	2–3	IFK Vänersborg	Helsingehus Arena, Söderhamn
19:00 CET	Söderberg 41' (pen); Edling 60'	Report	Liukkonen 23'; Berglund 51'; Callander 69'	Attendance: 862; Referee: Niclas Skog

16 February 2019	IFK Vänersborg	4–4	Broberg/Söderhamn IF	Arena Vänersborg, Vänersborg
16:00 CET	R. Öhrlund 22'; Wiklund 50'; Johansson 53'; Koch 58'	Report	Moisala 12'; Engström 24'; Wijk 55'; Forslund 69'	Attendance: 1,310; Referee: Adam Jokinen

IFK Vänersborg won 7–6 on aggregate.

==== IFK Motala vs Vetlanda BK ====
14 February 2019	IFK Motala	5–2	Vetlanda BK	XL-Bygg Arena, Motala
19:00 CET	Rohlén 25', 31'; Thorsson 45+3'; Gillgren 68'; Florén 77'	Report	Fedorov 6'; Peuhkuri 21'	Attendance: 869; Referee: Jacob Liljegren

16 February 2019	Vetlanda BK	3–6	IFK Motala	Hydro Arena, Vetlanda
16:00 CET	Nyberg 23'; Fedorov 37', 66'	Report	Gillgren 6', 87'; Enander 45+1'; Thorsson 72' (pen); Rohlén 83'; Florén 90'	Attendance: 1,169; Referee: Jonas Kandell

IFK Motala won 11–5 on aggregate.

=== Bracket ===
Quarterfinals
2	Västerås SK	7	5	4	6
7	IFK Vänersborg	3	6	3	2
3	Sandvikens AIK	0	3	4	5	3
6	Hammarby IF	3	5	2	2	5
1	Villa Lidköping BK	13	5	5
9	IFK Motala	2	1	2
4	Edsbyns IF	5	4	5
5	Bollnäs GIF	1	1	1

Semifinals
2	Västerås SK	6	4	6
6	Hammarby IF	3	3	2
1	Villa Lidköping BK	5	8	4
4	Edsbyns IF	1	4	3

Finals
1	Villa Lidköping BK	8
2	Västerås SK	4

=== Quarter-finals ===
==== Västerås SK vs IFK Vänersborg ====
19 February 2019	Västerås SK	7–3	IFK Vänersborg	ABB Arena, Västerås
19:00 CET	Holmberg 19'; Joneby 32'; Landström 37', 41'; Edberg 40'; S. Jansson 83', 90+2'	Report	Callander 10', 45'; Koch 25'	Attendance: 1,545; Referee: Daniel Labe

21 February 2019	IFK Vänersborg	6–5 (a.e.t.)	Västerås SK	Arena Vänersborg, Vänersborg
19:00 CET	Hedqvist 24', 68', 86'; Liukkonen 31', 45+1', 92'	Report	Andersson 27', 79'; Engström 77', 90+5' (pen); Bucht 89'	Attendance: 1,369; Referee: Jacob Liljegren
Note: IFK Vänersborg won the match on golden goal.

25 February 2019	Västerås SK	4–3	IFK Vänersborg	ABB Arena, Västerås
19:00 CET	Andersson 18'; Bergström 25'; Engström 35'; Hermansson 58'	Report	Hedqvist 1', 23'; Wikland 27'	Attendance: 1,925; Referee: Christoffer Eriksson

28 February 2019	IFK Vänersborg	2–6	Västerås SK	Arena Vänersborg, Vänersborg
19:00 CET	Wiklund 64'; Lundquist 90'	Report	Joneby 4'; Engström 12'; Landström 49', 64'; Olsson 62'; Bergström 75'	Attendance: 1,762; Referee: Adam Jokinen

Västerås SK won the tie 3–1.

==== Sandvikens AIK vs Hammarby IF ====
19 February 2019	Sandvikens AIK	0–3	Hammarby IF	Göransson Arena, Sandviken
19:00 CET		Report	Grachev 38'; Sundin 56'; Jonsson 87'	Attendance: 1,595; Referee: Ulrik Bergman

21 February 2019	Hammarby IF	5–3	Sandvikens AIK	Zinkensdamms IP, Stockholm
19:00 CET	Thorén 15'; Spjuth 37'; Jonsson 61'; Rimgård 65'; Fagerström 86' (pen)	Report	Mossberg 19', 47'; Henriksen 90+3'	Attendance: 3,044; Referee: Mikael Hillerius

25 February 2019	Sandvikens AIK	4–2	Hammarby IF	Göransson Arena, Sandviken
19:00 CET	C. Edlund 24', 90+1'; Haraldsson 36'; Henriksen 56'	Report	Fagerström 49'; Gilljam 89'	Attendance: 2,403; Referee: Niclas Skog

28 February 2019	Hammarby IF	2–5	Sandvikens AIK	Zinkensdamms IP, Stockholm
19:00 CET	Grachev 50'; Pizzoni Elfving 68'	Report	C. Edlund 26', 48', 90+4'; H. Edlund 79'; Mossberg 80'	Attendance: 4,165; Referee: Daniel Labe

3 March 2019	Sandvikens AIK	3–5	Hammarby IF	Göransson Arena, Sandviken
16:00 CET	Berlin 18'; C. Edlund 58' (pen); H. Edlund 80'	Report	Sundin 7', 71'; Spjuth 44'; Fagerström 54'; Grachev 60'	Attendance: 2,834; Referee: Jonas Kandell

Hammarby IF won the tie 3–2.

==== Villa Lidköping BK vs IFK Motala ====
20 February 2019	Villa Lidköping BK	13–2	IFK Motala	Sparbanken Arena, Lidköping
19:00 CET	D. Karlsson 4', 49' (pen), 70', 76'; Andersson 6', 17', 88'; Esplund 15', 40'; Persson 28'; M. Johansson 54'; M. Karlsson 72'; Löfstedt 83'	Report	Gillgren 12'; Enander 78'	Attendance: 2,634; Referee: Jacob Hallkvist

22 February 2019	IFK Motala	1–5	Villa Lidköping BK	XL-Bygg Arena, Motala
19:00 CET	Thorsson 22' (pen)	Report	M. Karlsson 12'; Löfstedt 31'; Andersson 39'; M. Johansson 52'; D. Karlsson 87'	Attendance: 1,225; Referee: Daniel Labe

26 February 2019	Villa Lidköping BK	5–2	IFK Motala	Sparbanken Arena, Lidköping
19:00 CET	Andersson 17'; D. Karlsson 55' (pen), 79'; Löfstedt 72'; M. Karlsson 90'	Report	Florén 23'; Gillgren 33'	Attendance: 3,023; Referee: Christoffer Aidesjö

Villa Lidköping BK won the tie 3–0.

==== Edsbyns IF vs Bollnäs GIF ====
20 February 2019	Edsbyns IF	5–1	Bollnäs GIF	Svenska Fönster Arena, Edsbyn
19:00 CET	Edling 2', 90+2'; To. Määttä 36'; Hammarström 58'; Hedell 59'	Report	Helavuori 61'	Attendance: 2,206; Referee: Christoffer Aidesjö

22 February 2019	Bollnäs GIF	1–4	Edsbyns IF	Sävstaås IP, Bollnäs
19:00 CET	Nilsson 26'	Report	Liw 15'; Hammarström 49'; Tu. Määttä 84'; Wikblad 88'	Attendance: 2,613; Referee: Ulrik Bergman

26 February 2019	Edsbyns IF	5–1	Bollnäs GIF	Svenska Fönster Arena, Edsbyn
19:00 CET	Hedell 18'; Wikblad 54', 58'; Edling 79'; Persson 83'	Report	Hellmyrs 84'	Attendance: 2,456; Referee: Jonas Kandell

Edsbyns IF won the tie 3–0.

=== Semi-finals ===
==== Västerås SK vs Hammarby IF ====
5 March 2019	Västerås SK	6–3	Hammarby IF	ABB Arena, Västerås
19:00 CET	Landström 4'; Engström 29', 84'; Bergström 69', 75', 90+4'	Report	Grachev 16'; Fagerström 23'; Jonsson 87'	Attendance: 3,002; Referee: Ulrik Bergman

8 March 2019	Hammarby IF	3–4	Västerås SK	Zinkensdamms IP, Stockholm
19:15 CET	Fagerström 62'; Spjuth 72'; Pizzoni Elfving 81'	Report	Jansson 7', 90+1'; Holmberg 15'; Hermansson 31'	Attendance: 4,406; Referee: Daniel Labe

11 March 2019	Västerås SK	6–2	Hammarby IF	ABB Arena, Västerås
19:00 CET	Andersson 9'; Bergström 34', 42', 45'; Joneby 81'; Engström 86' (pen)	Report	Fagerström 19'; Grachev 47'	Attendance: 4,527; Referee: Christoffer Aidesjö

Västerås SK won the tie 3–0.

==== Villa Lidköping BK vs Edsbyns IF ====
6 March 2019	Villa Lidköping BK	5–1	Edsbyns IF	Sparbanken Arena, Lidköping
19:00 CET	M. Karlsson 15', 82'; D. Karlsson 21'; Esplund 52'; J. Andersson 80'	Report	Hammarström 27'	Attendance: 4,206; Referee: Jonas Kandell

9 March 2019	Edsbyns IF	4–8	Villa Lidköping BK	Svenska Fönster Arena, Edsbyn
15:00 CET	Hammarström 17', 19'; Wikblad 47', 88'	Report	J. Andersson 5', 13', 51', 66'; Arvidsson 9', 86'; Löfstedt 45+1'; D. Karlsson 80'	Attendance: 2,246; Referee: Christoffer Aidesjö

12 March 2019	Villa Lidköping BK	4–3 (a.e.t.)	Edsbyns IF	Sparbanken Arena, Lidköping
19:00 CET	J. Andersson 12', 90+1'; D. Karlsson 27'; Esplund 99'	Report	Edling 38' (pen); Tu. Määttä 66'; H. Andersson 77'	Attendance: 5,400; Referee: Daniel Labe
Note: Villa Lidköping BK won the match on golden goal.

Villa Lidköping BK won the tie 3–0.

=== Final ===
23 March 2019
18:00 CET

Villa Lidköping BK	8–4	Västerås SK
Persson 10'; Eriksson 30'; Andreasson 36'; M. Karlsson 37'; M. Johansson 40'; J. Andersson 60'; D. Karlsson 62'; Löfstedt 90'	Report	Bergström 13'; Landström 34'; Gröhn 85'; R. Andersson 89'

Studenternas IP, Uppsala
Attendance: 18,667
Referee: Christoffer Aidesjö

== Relegation playoffs ==
Pos	Team	Pld	W	D	L	GF	GA	GD	Pts	Qualification	AIK	FBK	FBS	NIF
1	AIK	6	4	0	2	23	17	+6	8	Promotion to Elitserien	—	3–0	6–3	6–2
2	Frillesås BK	6	3	1	2	18	19	−1	7	Remain in Elitserien	6–5	—	2–5	3–2
3	Falu BS	6	2	2	2	19	17	+2	6	Relegation to Allsvenskan	5–1	2–2	—	2–2
4	Nässjö IF	6	1	1	4	13	20	−7	3	Remain in Allsvenskan	1–2	2–5	4–2	—
