= 2017 Bandy World Championship squads =

Below are the squads for the 2017 Bandy World Championship final tournament in Sweden.

== Group A ==
=== Finland ===
Coach: Antti Parviainen

No.	Pos.	Player	Date of birth (age)	Caps	Club
23	GK	Kimmo Kyllönen			(Sweden) Tellus
72	GK	Pertti Virtanen			(Finland) OLS
6		Teemu Määttä			(Sweden) Sirius
8		Joonas Peuhkuri			(Sweden) Sirius
10		Mikko Rytkönen			(Finland) JPS
11		Markus Kumpuoja			(Sweden) Sirius
14		Samuli Helavuori			(Sweden) Bollnäs
20		Juho Liukkonen			(Finland) Kampparit
21		Tuomas Liukkonen			(Finland) Kampparit
22		Ville Aaltonen			(Sweden) Bollnäs
46		Ilari Moisala			(Russia) Volga
66		Tommi Määttä			(Sweden) Edsbyn
70		Rolf Larsson			(Sweden) Hammarby
74		Eetu Peuhkuri			(Sweden) Gripen Trollhättan
85		Pekka Rintala			(Sweden) Peace & Love City
87		Mikko Lukkarila			(Sweden) IFK Vänersborg
91		Janne Rintala			(Sweden) Västerås
99		Tuomas Määttä			(Sweden) Edsbyn

=== Russia ===
Coach:

No.	Pos.	Player	Date of birth (age)	Caps	Club
	GK	Roman Chernych			(Russia) Yenisey
	GK	Denis Rysev			(Russia) Baykal-Energiya
	DF	Pavel Bulatov			(Sweden) IFK Vänersborg
	DF	Yuri Vikulin			(Russia) Yenisey
	DF	Mikhail Prokopiev			(Russia) Yenisey
	DF	Vasily Granovsky			(Russia) SKA-Neftyanik
	DF	Alexei Chizhov			(Russia) SKA-Neftyanik
	DF	Valery Ivkin			(Russia) SKA-Neftyanik
	MF	Alan Dzhusoev			(Sweden) Sandviken
	MF	Dmitry Savelyev (bandy player)			(Russia) Vodnik
	MF	Janis Befus			(Russia) Vodnik
	MF	Sergey Shaburov			(Russia) Dynamo Moscow
	MF	Maxim Ishkeldin			(Russia) SKA-Neftyanik
	MF	Yuri Shardakov			(Russia) SKA-Neftyanik
	MF	Alexander Antipov			(Russia) SKA-Neftyanik
	FW	Yevgeny Ivanushkin			(Russia) Baykal-Energiya
	FW	Artem Bondarenko			(Russia) SKA-Neftyanik
	FW	Nikita Ivanov			(Sweden) IFK Vänersborg
	FW	Almaz Mirgazov			(Russia) Yenisey

=== Sweden ===
Coach: Svenne Olsson

No.	Pos.	Player	Date of birth (age)	Caps	Club
	GK	Andreas Bergwall			(Sweden) Västerås
	GK	Patrik Hedberg			(Sweden) Hammarby
		Andreas Westh			(Sweden) Bollnäs
		Martin Johansson			(Sweden) Villa Lidköping
		Linus Pettersson			(Sweden) Sandviken
		David Pizzoni Elfving			(Sweden) Hammarby
		Per Hellmyrs			(Sweden) Bollnäs
		Hans Andersson			(Sweden) Edsbyn
		Erik Säfström			(Russia) SKA-Neftyanik
		Daniel Berlin			(Sweden) Bollnäs
		Johan Löfstedt			(Sweden) Vetlanda
		Daniel Mossberg			(Sweden) Sandviken
		Adam Gilljam			(Sweden) Hammarby
		Jesper Eriksson			(Sweden) Villa Lidköping
		Christoffer Edlund			(Sweden) Sandviken
		Erik Pettersson			(Sweden) Sandviken
		Daniel Andersson			(Sweden) Villa Lidköping
		Patrik Nilsson			(Sweden) Bollnäs
