= 2019 Bandy World Championship =

International bandy competition

XXXIXth Bandy World Championship

Tournament details
- Host country: Sweden
- City: Vänersborg
- Venue: Arena Vänersborg
- Dates: 26 January – 2 February (Division A); 21–25 January (Division B)
- Teams: 8 (Division A) and 12 (Division B)

Final positions
- Champions: Russia (12th title)
- Runners-up: Sweden
- Third place: Finland
- Fourth place: Kazakhstan

Tournament statistics
- Scoring leader(s): Division A (Norway) Felix Callander (13 goals); Division B (Estonia) Aleksei Ibatulov (27 goals)

Awards
- MVP: (Sweden) Erik Pettersson

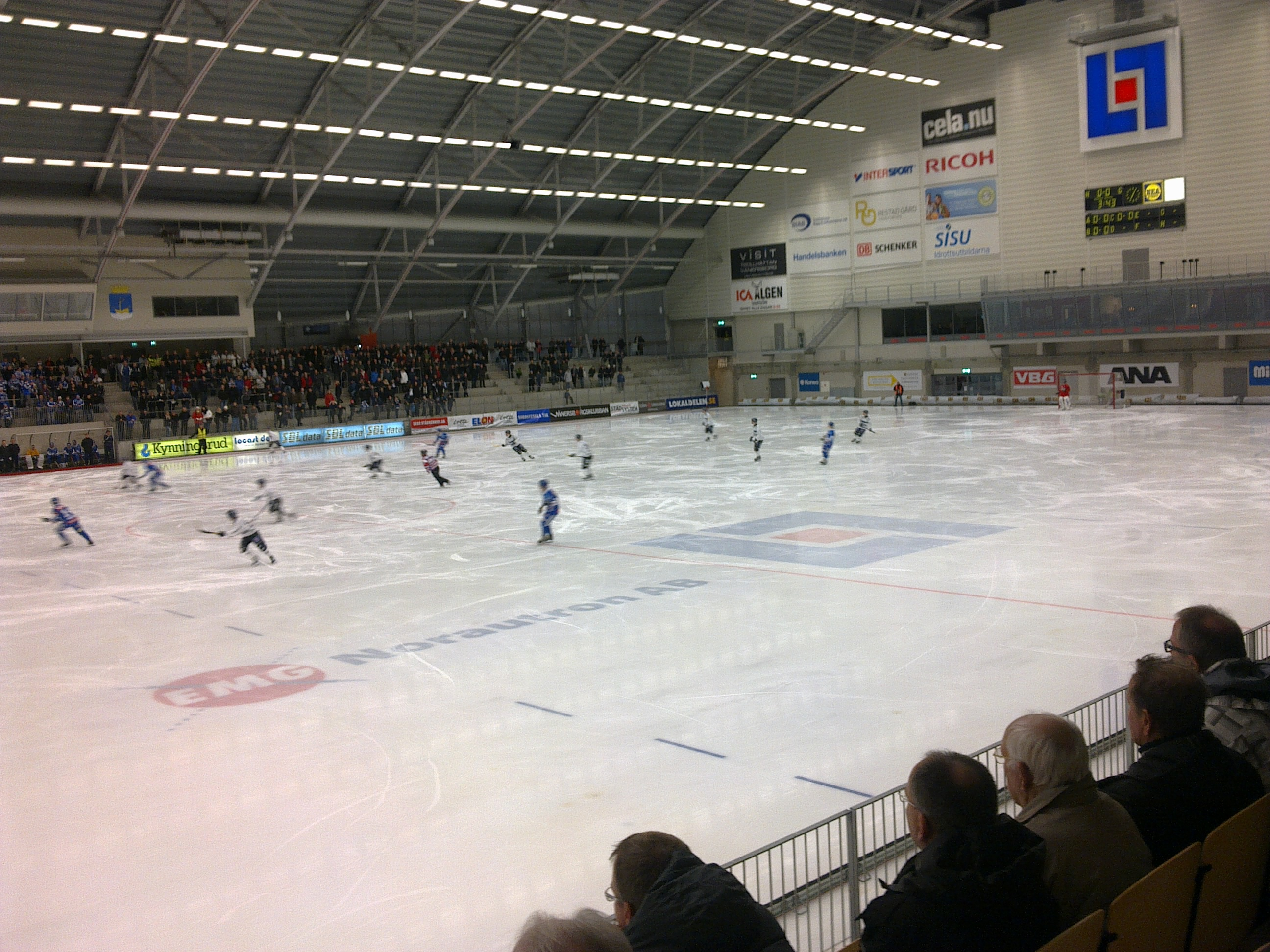
Main arena

2019 Bandy World Championship was held in Vänersborg, Sweden, between men's national teams among bandy playing nations. It was the XXXIXth Bandy World Championship.

== Host selection ==
The tournament was supposed to be held in Irkutsk in Russia. However, the decision was reconsidered and the tournament was held in Vänersborg in Sweden instead. Irkutsk might get the right to host the 2020 tournament, if FIB is given guarantees that the planned indoor arena will be ready for use in time. The Russian government has expressed its support for the building of such a stadium.

== Venues ==
Vänersborg	Trollhättan	Surte	Borås
Arena Vänersborg; Capacity: 5,700	Slättbergshallen; Capacity: 4,000	Ale Arena; Capacity: ≈2,000	Boda isstadion Capacity: ?

== Qualified nations ==
A total of 20 nations took part in the championships.

=== Division A ===
==== Pool A ====
- Finland
- Kazakhstan
- Russia
- Sweden

==== Pool B ====
- Germany
- Netherlands
- Norway
- United States

=== Division B ===
- Canada
- China
- Czech Republic
- Estonia
- Great Britain
- Hungary
- Japan
- Latvia
- Slovakia
- Somalia
- Switzerland
- Ukraine

== Division A ==
=== Preliminary round ===
All times are local (UTC+1).

==== Group A ====
Pos	Team	Pld	W	D	L	GF	GA	GD	Pts	Qualification
1	Sweden (H)	3	3	0	0	34	5	+29	6	Semifinals
2	Russia	3	2	0	1	29	9	+20	4	Semifinals
3	Finland	3	1	0	2	11	9	+2	2	Play-offs
4	Kazakhstan	3	0	0	3	2	53	−51	0	Play-offs

Source: FIB
(H) Hosts
26 January
16:15

Sweden	6–4	Russia
Pizzoni Elfving 19'; Jansson 37'; Edlund 44'; Esplund 61'; E. Pettersson 63'; Berlin 90'	Report	Ishkeldin 36', 49', 81'; Mirgazov 90+1'

Arena Vänersborg, Vänersborg
Attendance: 3,223
Referee: (Finland) Mats-Olof Gustafsson
26 January
18:00

Finland	9–0	Kazakhstan
Fedorov 10', 24', 73', 85'; Tu. Määttä 53', 64', 79'; Kumpuoja 69' (p); Te. Määttä 71'	Report

Boda IP, Borås
Attendance: 1,545
Referee: (Sweden) Christoffer Aidesjö

28 January
16:30

Russia	22–1	Kazakhstan
Egorychev 4', 8', 46', 52', 78'; Dzhusoev 10'; Dergaev 17', 71', 80', 82'; Bondarenko 30', 43', 45+1', 58', 84'; Mirgazov 36', 39', 62', 81'; Kalanchin 74'; Vasilenko 87'; Prokopyev 90'	Report	Vshivkov 15'

Arena Vänersborg, Vänersborg
Attendance: 228
Referee: (Finland) Petri Kuusela
28 January
19:00

Sweden	6–0	Finland
Andersson 24', 74'; Esplund 51'; E. Pettersson 55' (p), 66' (p); Löfstedt 68'	Report

Ale Arena, Surte
Attendance: 1,653
Referee: (Russia) Dmitriy Dobryanskiy

30 January
16:00

Finland	2–3	Russia
Liukkonen 3'; Heinonen 40'	Report	Befus 18'; Dergaev 50' (p); Ishkeldin 88'

Arena Vänersborg, Vänersborg
Attendance: 972
Referee: (Sweden) Christoffer Aidesjö
30 January
19:30

Sweden	22–1	Kazakhstan
E. Pettersson 3', 6', 14', 40' (p); Andersson 9', 11', 37'; Edlund 20', 82', 88', 90'; Löfstedt 27'; Sjöström 30'; Jansson 35', 51'; Fagerström 60', 69', 84'; Esplund 62', 80'; Gilljam 65'; Pizzoni Elfving 67'	Report	Utebaliyev 58'

Arena Vänersborg, Vänersborg
Attendance: 744
Referee: (Finland) Petri Kuusela

==== Group B ====
Pos	Team	Pld	W	D	L	GF	GA	GD	Pts	Qualification
1	Norway	3	3	0	0	45	4	+41	6	Play-offs
2	United States	3	1	1	1	23	15	+8	3 (Note: United States won after-match penalties against Germany 2–0.)	Play-offs
3	Germany	3	1	1	1	21	42	−21	3	7th place game
4	Netherlands	3	0	0	3	12	40	−28	0	7th place game

Source: FIB
Notes:
27 January
12:00

Norway	6–3	United States
Kristoffersen 2', 45'; Callander 12', 39', 83'; Jerner 51'	Report	Lickteig 69'; Carman 88'; Fabie 90'

Arena Vänersborg, Vänersborg
Attendance: 546
Referee: (Finland) Petri Kuusela
27 January
15:00

Netherlands	10–13	Germany
Cras 5', 52', 61' (p), 78'; Vriezen 21'; Speijers 48', 86'; S. Tveitan 57'; Hinsbroek 83'; Geenen 90'	Report	Dunaev 2', 32', 64'; Koch 8', 20', 54'; Kuznetsov 11'; Kolyagin 22', 36', 75', 87'; Wang-Norderud 27', 66'

Arena Vänersborg, Vänersborg
Attendance: 164
Referee: (Russia) Dmitriy Dobryanskiy

28 January
09:30

United States	13–2	Netherlands
Zitouni 11', 39', 47'; Brown 13', 43', 49'; Richardson 17' (p), 46', 68'; Palmer 24'; Lickteig 75', 85'; Knutson 79'	Report	Cras 45+3'; Den Brok 56'

Arena Vänersborg, Vänersborg
Attendance: 83
Referee: (Sweden) Christoffer Aidesjö
28 January
13:00

Germany	1–25	Norway
Dunaev 8'	Report	Callander 2', 18', 26', 54', 90+1'; Kristoffersen 5', 19', 21' (p), 31', 64', 77', 79'; Randsborg 28'; Jerner 38', 61', 87'; J. Löyning 53', 56', 63', 83', 90+2'; Högevold 66'; Cras 68'; Hagen 72'; Sterkeby 86'

Arena Vänersborg, Vänersborg
Attendance: 222
Referee: (Finland) Mats-Olof Gustafsson

30 January
08:00

Norway	14–0	Netherlands
Svenn 3'; Fremstad 6', 31'; Callander 11', 36', 40', 76'; Jerner 20', 62'; Kristoffersen 24', 58' (p); Remman 42'; Sterkeby 64'; Randsborg 87'	Report

Arena Vänersborg, Vänersborg
Attendance: 38
Referee: (Russia) Dmitriy Dobryanskiy
30 January
11:30

United States	7–7	Germany
Lickteig 1'; Fabie 12', 68'; Brown 65'; Richardson 69', 78'; Zitouni 81'	Report	Dunaev 22', 37', 82'; Koch 40' (p), 42' (p), 55'; Kuznetsov 47'
Penalties
	2–0

Arena Vänersborg, Vänersborg
Attendance: 554
Referee: (Finland) Mats-Olof Gustafsson

=== Knockout stage ===
==== Bracket ====
Play-offs
31 January
Kazakhstan	4
Norway	1
31 January
Finland	10
United States	1

Semifinals
1 February
Sweden	20
Kazakhstan	1
1 February
Russia	6
Finland	2

Final
2 February
Sweden	5
Russia (OT)	6
Third place
2 February
Finland	8
Kazakhstan	2

==== Play-offs ====
31 January
15:30

Kazakhstan	4–1	Norway
Isaliyev 44', 64' (p); Shadrin 84'; Nugmanov 89' (p)	Report	Callander 27'

Arena Vänersborg, Vänersborg
Attendance: 522
Referee: (Finland) Mats-Olof Gustafsson
31 January
19:00

Finland	10–1	United States
Kumpuoja 3'; Lukkarila 7', 41', 55'; Liukkonen 14'; Tu. Määttä 45+1', 70'; Heinonen 53', 72'; To. Määttä 60'	Report	Sawatske 67'

Arena Vänersborg, Vänersborg
Attendance: 347
Referee: (Sweden) Christoffer Aidesjö

==== Seventh place game ====
1 February
09:00

Germany	12–6	Netherlands
Dunaev 3'; Koch 10', 14', 31', 45+1', 64' (p); Wang-Norderud 48', 87'; Kuznetsov 52', 79'; Kolyagin 69', 71'	Report	Cras 9', 13', 51'; S. Tveitan 12'; Hengst 45', 90+1'

Slättbergshallen, Trollhättan
Attendance: 64
Referee: (Finland) Petri Kuusela

==== Fifth place game ====
1 February
12:30

Norway	9–3	United States
Guldbrandsen 8', 90+2'; Callander 14', 90'; Kristoffersen 21'; Jerner 48'; P. Löyning 68', 80'; Randsborg 81'	Report	Brown 49', 62', 74'

Slättbergshallen, Trollhättan
Attendance: 101
Referee: (Russia) Dmitriy Dobryanskiy

==== Semifinals ====
1 February
16:30

Russia	6–2	Finland
Dergaev 15', 81'; Vasilenko 22'; Mirgazov 51'; Ishkeldin 52'; Bondarenko 67'	Report	Kumpuoja 8'; Heinonen 37'

Arena Vänersborg, Vänersborg
Attendance: 1,412
Referee: (Sweden) Christoffer Aidesjö
1 February
20:00

Sweden	20–1	Kazakhstan
Hellmyrs 4'; E. Pettersson 5', 28', 33', 44', 48'; Gilljam 10'; Edlund 17', 25', 42', 61'; Fagerström 24', 58', 77', 82'; Pehrsson 35' (p), 65'; Jansson 56'; Löfstedt 79'; Pizzoni Elfving 80'	Report	Vshivkov 41'

Arena Vänersborg, Vänersborg
Attendance: 1,033
Referee: (Finland) Mats-Olof Gustafsson

==== Third place game ====
2 February
10:00

Finland	8–2	Kazakhstan
Te. Määttä 12'; Tu. Määttä 14', 56', 68'; Hauska 43'; Aaltonen 48'; Peuhkuri 61'; Fedorov 82'	Report	Isaliyev 50' (p), 86'

Arena Vänersborg, Vänersborg
Attendance: 761
Referee: (Russia) Dimitriy Dobryanskiy

==== Final ====
2 February
16:00

Sweden	5–6 (OT)	Russia
Edlund 2', 75'; Esplund 39'; Pettersson 42'; Fagerström 67'	Report	Dergaev 13' (p), 71'; Mirgazov 63', 79', 102'; Vikulin 89'

Arena Vänersborg, Vänersborg
Attendance: 4,169
Referee: (Finland) Petri Kuusela

=== Final ranking ===
Rank	Team
1st place, gold medalist(s)	Russia
2nd place, silver medalist(s)	Sweden
3rd place, bronze medalist(s)	Finland
4	Kazakhstan
5	Norway
6	United States
7	Germany
8	Netherlands ▼

=== Awards ===
Best players selected by the directorate:

- Best Goaltender: (Finland) Kimmo Kyllönen
- Best Defenceman: (Sweden) Martin Johansson
- Best Midfielder: (Russia) Maksim Ishkeldin
- Best Forward: (Sweden) Erik Pettersson
- MVP: (Sweden) Erik Pettersson
- Fair Play: Sweden

== Division B ==
=== Preliminary round ===
==== Group A ====
Pos	Team	Pld	W	D	L	GF	GA	GD	Pts	Qualification
1	Estonia	5	4	0	1	35	18	+17	8 (Note: Hungary 6–10 Estonia)	Semifinals
2	Hungary	5	4	0	1	24	16	+8	8	Semifinals
3	Canada	5	3	1	1	25	11	+14	7	5th place game
4	Czech Republic	5	2	0	3	10	16	−6	4	7th place game
5	Ukraine	5	1	1	3	11	20	−9	3	9th place game
6	Switzerland	5	0	0	5	6	30	−24	0	11th place game

Source: FIB
Notes:
21 January
08:30

Ukraine	3–3	Canada
	Report
Penalties
	1–2

Arena Vänersborg, Vänersborg
21 January
10:30

Hungary	6–10	Estonia
	Report

Arena Vänersborg, Vänersborg
21 January
12:30

Czech Republic	4–1	Switzerland
	Report

Arena Vänersborg, Vänersborg
21 January
17:00

Hungary	6–2	Ukraine
	Report

Arena Vänersborg, Vänersborg

22 January
08:30

Canada	2–0	Czech Republic
	Report

Slättbergshallen, Trollhättan
22 January
10:30

Estonia	9–0	Switzerland
	Report

Slättbergshallen, Trollhättan
22 January
14:30

Hungary	4–1	Canada
	Report

Slättbergshallen, Trollhättan
22 January
17:00

Switzerland	0–2	Ukraine
	Report

Arena Vänersborg, Vänersborg

23 January
08:30

Estonia	7–2	Czech Republic
	Report

Arena Vänersborg, Vänersborg
23 January
10:30

Canada	11–3	Switzerland
	Report

Arena Vänersborg, Vänersborg
23 January
14:30

Czech Republic	1–4	Hungary
	Report

Arena Vänersborg, Vänersborg
23 January
19:00

Ukraine	2–8	Estonia
	Report

Arena Vänersborg, Vänersborg

24 January
08:30

Switzerland	2–4	Hungary
	Report

Slättbergshallen, Trollhättan
24 January
10:30

Estonia	1–8	Canada
	Report

Slättbergshallen, Trollhättan
24 January
12:30

Ukraine	2–3	Czech Republic
	Report

Slättbergshallen, Trollhättan

==== Group B ====
Pos	Team	Pld	W	D	L	GF	GA	GD	Pts	Qualification
1	Great Britain	5	5	0	0	39	2	+37	10	Semifinals
2	Japan	5	4	0	1	24	3	+21	8	Semifinals
3	Latvia	5	3	0	2	39	6	+33	6	5th place game
4	Slovakia	5	2	0	3	17	12	+5	4	7th place game
5	China	5	1	0	4	6	41	−35	2	9th place game
6	Somalia	5	0	0	5	1	62	−61	0	11th place game

Source: FIB
21 January
08:30

Somalia	1–8	Slovakia
	Report

Slättbergshallen, Trollhättan
21 January
10:30

Japan	8–0	China
	Report

Slättbergshallen, Trollhättan
21 January
12:30

Latvia	0–5	Great Britain
	Report

Slättbergshallen, Trollhättan
21 January
19:00

Japan	12–0	Somalia
	Report

Arena Vänersborg, Vänersborg

22 January
08:30

Slovakia	0–3	Latvia
	Report

Arena Vänersborg, Vänersborg
22 January
10:30

China	0–11	Great Britain
	Report

Arena Vänersborg, Vänersborg
22 January
14:30

Japan	2–0	Slovakia
	Report

Arena Vänersborg, Vänersborg
22 January
19:00

Great Britain	14–0	Somalia
	Report

Arena Vänersborg, Vänersborg

23 January
08:30

China	0–14	Latvia
	Report

Slättbergshallen, Trollhättan
23 January
10:30

Slovakia	1–6	Great Britain
	Report

Slättbergshallen, Trollhättan
23 January
14:30

Latvia	0–1	Japan
	Report

Slättbergshallen, Trollhättan
23 January
17:00

Somalia	0–6	China
	Report

Arena Vänersborg, Vänersborg

24 January
08:30

Great Britain	3–1	Japan
	Report

Arena Vänersborg, Vänersborg
24 January
10:30

China	0–8	Slovakia
	Report

Arena Vänersborg, Vänersborg
24 January
12:30

Somalia	0–22	Latvia
	Report

Arena Vänersborg, Vänersborg

=== Knockout stage ===
==== Bracket ====
Semifinals
24 January
Estonia	12
Japan	1
24 January
Great Britain	5
Hungary	4

Final
25 January
Estonia	9
Great Britain	3
Third place
25 January
Japan	0
Hungary	6

==== Semifinals ====
24 January
17:00

Estonia	12–1	Japan
	Report

Arena Vänersborg, Vänersborg
24 January
19:00

Great Britain	5–4	Hungary
	Report

Arena Vänersborg, Vänersborg

==== Eleventh place game ====
25 January
08:30

Switzerland	9–0	Somalia
	Report

Slättbergshallen, Trollhättan

==== Ninth place game ====
25 January
08:30

Ukraine	7–2	China
	Report

Arena Vänersborg, Vänersborg

==== Seventh place game ====
25 January
10:30

Czech Republic	3–2 (OT)	Slovakia
	Report

Slättbergshallen, Trollhättan

==== Fifth place game ====
25 January
10:30

Canada	2–3	Latvia
	Report

Arena Vänersborg, Vänersborg

==== Third place game ====
25 January
14:00

Japan	0–6	Hungary
	Report

Arena Vänersborg, Vänersborg

==== Final ====
25 January
16:00

Estonia	9–3	Great Britain
	Report

Arena Vänersborg, Vänersborg

=== Final ranking ===
Rank	Team
1	Estonia ▲
2	Great Britain
3	Hungary
4	Japan
5	Latvia
6	Canada
7	Czech Republic
8	Slovakia
9	Ukraine
10	China
11	Switzerland
12	Somalia
