= Göran Fredrik Göransson =

Swedish merchant, ironmaster and industrialist (1819–1900)

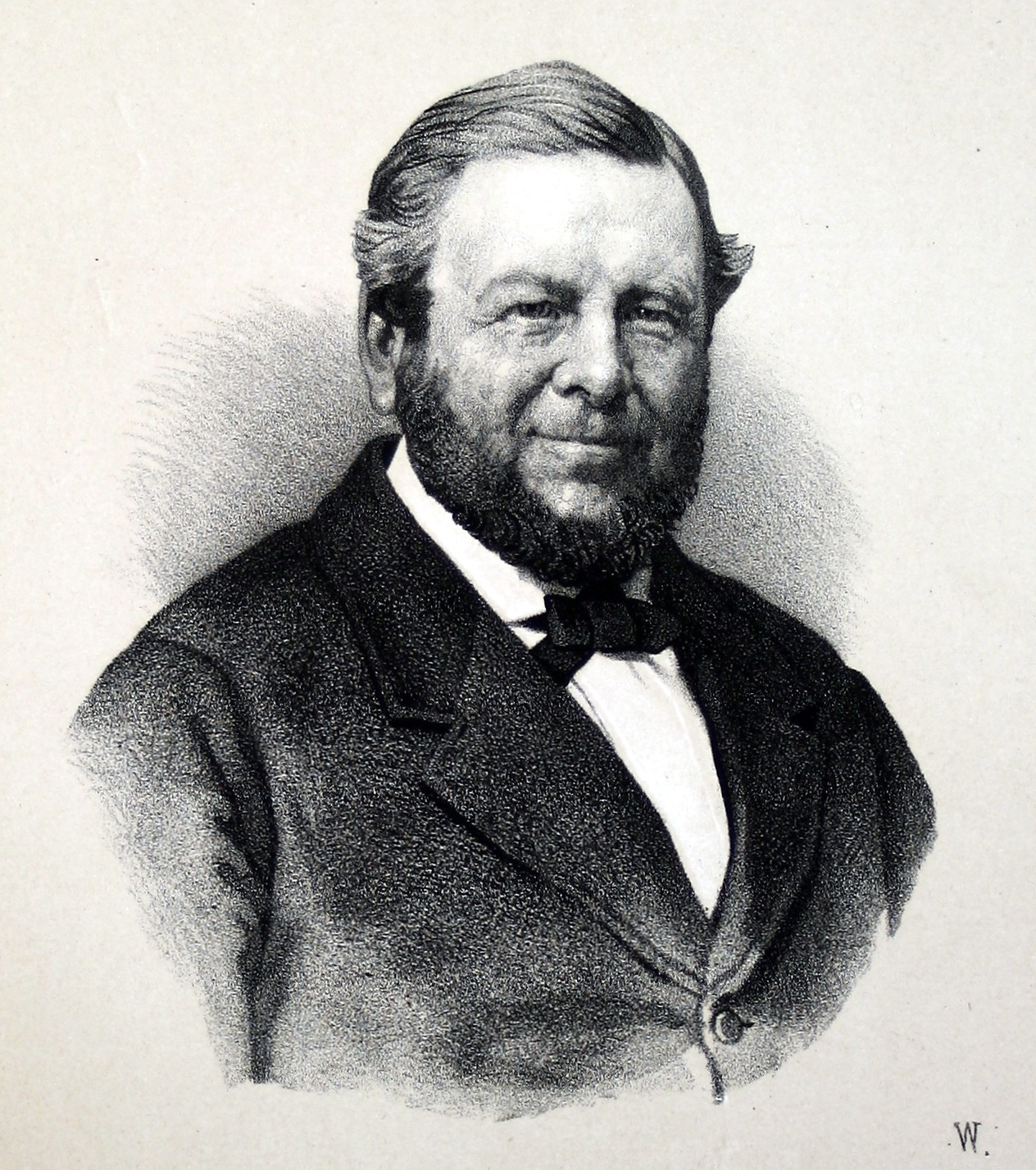
- Portrait of Göransson from the book "Svenska industriens män"
- Born: 20 January 1819; Gävle, Sweden
- Died: 12 May 1900 (aged 81); Sandviken, Sweden
- Burial place: Sandviken
- Occupations: Partner in Daniel Elfstrand & Co.; Founder and chairman of Sandvikens Jernverks AB
- Spouse: Catharina Elisabeth Sehlberg (m. 1842)
- Children: 6
- Parent(s): Anders Petter Göransson (father); Maria Catharina Elfstrand (mother)

Göran Fredrik Göransson (20 January 1819 – 12 May 1900) was a Swedish merchant, ironmaster and industrialist. He was the founder of the company Sandvikens Jernverks AB (now called Sandvik AB) and was the first person to implement the Bessemer process successfully on an industrial scale and pioneered ingot steel in the Swedish iron and steel industry.

== Early life ==
Göran Fredrik Göransson was born on 20 January 1819 in Gävle, Sweden, to Maria Catharina Elfstrand and Anders Petter Göransson. He was the oldest son in the family of three girls and four boys. He went to school in Gävle and also spent 18 months in Germany, France, England and the United States in order to acquire experience in conducting international business.

== Career ==
In 1841, Göransson became a partner in the firm Daniel Elfstrand & Co., and his family business, and its director in 1856. Elfstrand & Co. was a shipbuilding and ship-owning concern and an exporter of iron and lumber. In 1856, the company also acquired the iron-works in Högbo along with the Edske blast furnace.

Göransson traveled to England in May 1857 to acquire a steam engine for the Edske furnace and to secure at least a part of the Swedish rights to Bessemer's patent. He attended the demonstration of the Bessemer process at Baxter House which convinced him that the process was sound despite adverse reports already being published about it. He also managed to convince the initially skeptical English of the excellence of the process and his support was instrumental to the international spread of the method. He purchased one-fifth of the Swedish rights to the patent, which would allow his company to produce 500 tons of steel every year at a royalty of 2 shillings per ton. Göransson also placed an order for two furnaces, a boiler, a steam blowing engine, and everything required for their installation at Edske, with W & J Galloway & Sons before returning to Sweden.

Upon his return, the Royal Swedish Academy of Sciences gave him a sum of 50,000 Swedish crowns for financing steel production using the Bessemer process. The Bessemer method involved blasting a strong current of air through molten iron to burn off the carbon and other impurities. However, it proved difficult to keep the temperature high enough throughout the process. Göransson's initial efforts at the new converter plant built at Edske produced steel that was full of slag but he persisted in his experiments. However, Elfstrand & Co. was forced into bankruptcy in December 1857 but his progress with the Bessemer process was sufficient to convince the administrators to continue financing the experiments. The Swedish Ironmasters' Association, known as the Jernkontoret, sent a committee to observe the experiments after Göransson successfully lobbied them for help, and later sanctioned a loan and assigned a metallurgist to help him perfect the process. Göransson successfully managed to produce steel on an industrial scale using the new process on 18 July 1858.

He founded the firm Högbo Stål & Jernwerks AB on 31 January 1862 in Sandviken, Sweden and presented the now commercially viable Bessemer process at the International Exhibition in London. However, Göransson and the company entered into receivership in 1866 due to bad capital resources. In 1868, the company was acquired and reconstructed into Sandvikens Jernverks AB with his eldest son, Anders Henrik Göransson as managing director and Per Murén as chairman. The firm was able to quickly expand in large foreign industrial markets such as Germany, Great Britain and the United States mainly due to Göransson's extensive connections abroad, cultivated during his time as general manager in Elfstrand & Co. Göransson would succeed Murén as the company's chairman in 1883.

== Personal life and legacy ==
Göransson married Catharina Elisabeth Sehlberg on 31 May 1842. They had four sons and two daughters. His eldest son, Anders Henrik, would become managing director of Sandvikens Jernverks AB and would later succeed his father as chairman after his death.

Göransson is known as the father of ingot steel for his refinement and development of the Bessemer process by which steel could be produced at an industrial scale. He is also responsible for the founding of Sandviken in 1862, which grew from a small fishing community on the bay of the Storsjön lake to a thriving town around the steelworks that he had established, and where most residents worked or owed their livelihoods to the company.

In the 1860s, Göransson founded Stiftelsen den Göranssonska Fonden, a foundation to help his firm's employees and their families to make ends meet. Along with two other foundations established by his descendants, the Foundation funds students' grants and treatment for the elderly, disabled and the chronically ill in the Sandviken Municipality. The Foundation also financed the construction of Göransson Arena, a multi-purpose indoor arena used for entertainment, sporting and cultural activities, which is named after him.

He died on 12 May 1900 in Sandviken and is buried in the Sandviken cemetery.

== Honors and awards ==
- Grand Cross of the Order of Vasa
- Knight of the Order of the Polar Star
- Jernkontoret's grand gold medal
- Member of the Royal Swedish Academy of Sciences

== See also ==
- Sandvik Coromant
