= List of indoor arenas in Sweden =

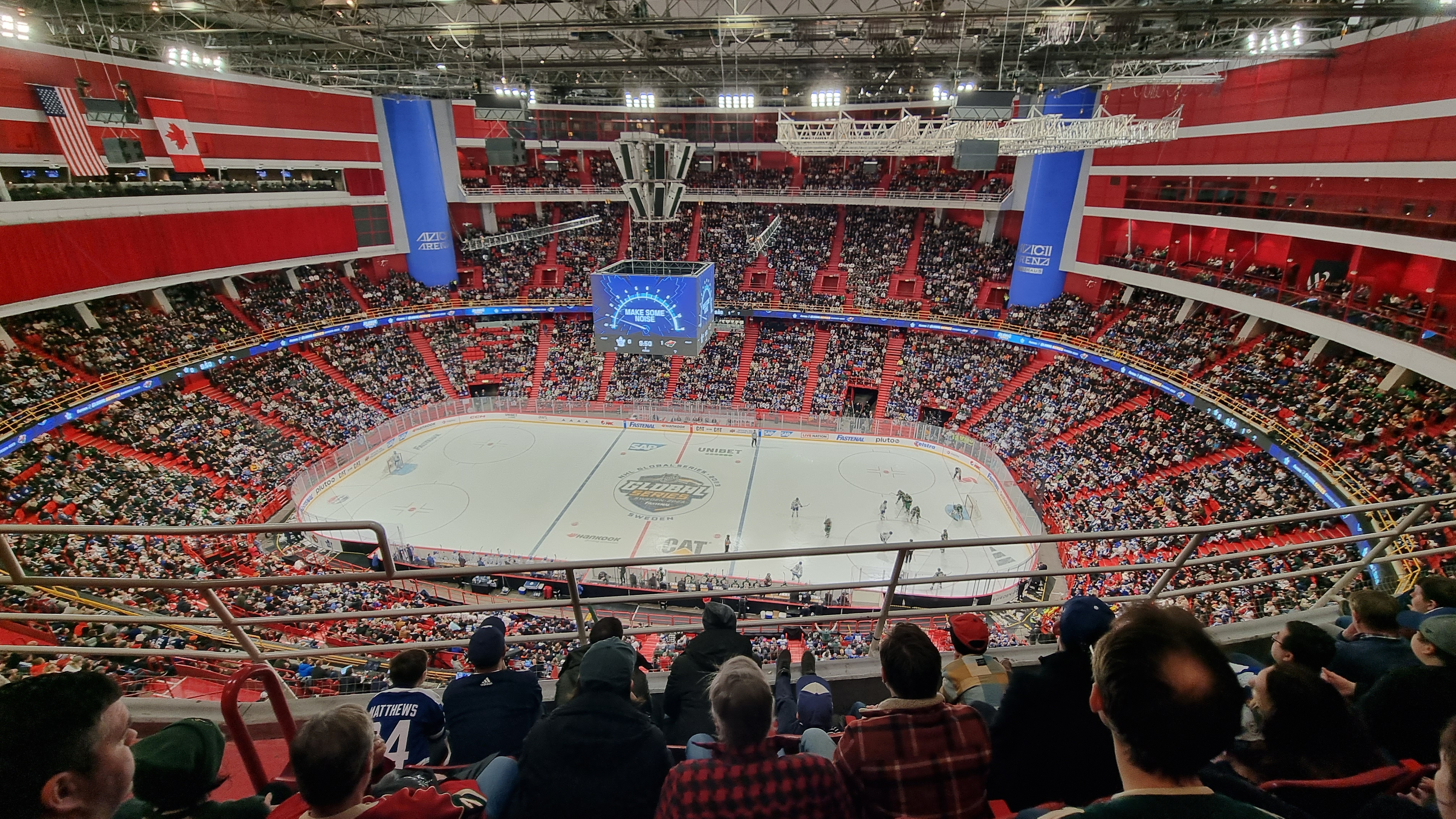
The Avicii Arena hosting the NHL Global Series event in 2023.

The following is a list of indoor arenas in Sweden with a capacity of at least 4,000 at sporting events. The arenas in the table are ranked by capacity; the arenas with the highest capacities are listed first.

== Current arenas ==
Image	Arena	Capacity	City	Main sport	Home team(s)	Opened/Renovated
	Avicii Arena	13,850	Stockholm	ice hockey	Sweden men's national ice hockey team, Djurgårdens IF, AIK (high-profile games)	1989
	Malmö Arena	12,600	Malmö	ice hockey	Malmö Redhawks	2008
	Scandinavium	12,044	Gothenburg	ice hockey	Frölunda HC	1971/1991, 2006
	ABB Arena Syd	9,000	Västerås	bandy	Västerås SK Bandy, Tillberga IK Bandy	2007
	Löfbergs Arena	8,647	Karlstad	ice hockey	Färjestad BK	2001
	Saab Arena	8,500	Linköping	ice hockey	Linköping HC	2004
	Hovet	8,094	Stockholm	ice hockey	Djurgårdens IF, AIK	1955/1962
	Monitor ERP Arena	7,909	Gävle	ice hockey	Brynäs IF	1967/2006
	Tegera Arena	7,650	Leksand	ice hockey	Leksands IF	2005
	Frölundaborg	7,600	Gothenburg	ice hockey	Bäcken HC; Frölunda HC (when Scandinavium is unavailable)	1967/2009
	Hägglunds Arena	7,600	Örnsköldsvik	ice hockey	Modo Hockey	2006
	Husqvarna Garden	7,000	Jönköping	ice hockey	HV71	1958/2000
	Nobelhallen	6,300	Karlskoga	ice hockey	BIK Karlskoga	1972
	Coop Norrbotten Arena	6,300	Luleå	ice hockey	Luleå HF	1986/2002, 2009
	Scaniarinken	6,200	Södertälje	ice hockey	Södertälje SK	1970/2005
	NHK Arena	6,000	Timrå	ice hockey	Timrå IK	2003
	Skellefteå Kraft Arena	5,801	Skellefteå	ice hockey	Skellefteå AIK	1966/2007
	Malmö Isstadion	5,800	Malmö	ice hockey	IK Pantern, Malmö Redhawks (when Malmö Arena is unavailable)	1970
	Vida Arena	5,750	Växjö	ice hockey	Växjö Lakers	2011
	PEAB Arena	5,500	Nyköping	ice hockey	Nyköpings Hockey	2003
	A3 Arena	5,400	Umeå	ice hockey	IF Björklöven, Tegs SK Hockey	1963/2001, 2006, 2010
	Behrn Arena	5,100	Örebro	ice hockey	Örebro HK	1965/2011
	Catena Arena	5,045	Ängelholm	ice hockey	Rögle BK	2009
	Kungliga tennishallen	5,000	Stockholm	tennis	Kungl. Lawn Tennis Klubben	1943
	Kristianstad Arena	5,000	Kristianstad	handball	IFK Kristianstad	2010
	ABB Arena Nord	4,902	Västerås	ice hockey	Västerås IK	1965/2007
	Stångebro Ishall	4,700	Linköping	ice hockey	HF Linköping	1975
	Helsingborg Arena	4,700	Helsingborg	handball	OV Helsingborg HK, FC Helsingborg	2012
	Jalas Arena	4,500	Mora	ice hockey	Mora IK	1967/2004
	Sparbanken Lidköping Arena	4,300	Lidköping	bandy	Villa Lidköping BK	2009
	Himmelstalundshallen	4,280	Norrköping	ice hockey	HC Vita Hästen	1977
	Baltiska Hallen	4,000	Malmö	ice hockey	HK Malmö	1964
	Björknäshallen	4,000	Boden	ice hockey	Bodens HF	1965
	Edsbyn Arena	4,000	Edsbyn	bandy	Edsbyns IF	2003
	Göransson Arena	4,000	Sandviken	bandy	Sandvikens AIK	2009
	Halmstad Arena	4,000	Halmstad	ice hockey	HK Drott	2009
	Slättbergshallen	4,000	Trollhättan	bandy	Gripen Trollhättan BK	2009
	Partille Arena	4,000	Partille (Gothenburg)	handball	IK Sävehof	2016

== Proposed arenas ==
Arena	Capacity	City	Home team	To be opened
New Scandinavium Arena	16,000	Gothenburg	TBD	TBD
Uppsala Eventcenter	6,800	Uppsala	Almtuna IS	Unknown

== See also ==
- List of indoor arenas
- List of indoor arenas in Canada
- List of indoor arenas in the United Kingdom
- List of indoor arenas in the United States
- List of football stadiums in Sweden
- Lists of stadiums
