= Jäderfors =

- Location within Sweden Gävleborg Location within Sweden
- Coordinates: 60°41′N 16°40′E
- Country: Sweden
- Province: Gästrikland
- County: Gävleborg County
- Municipality: Sandviken Municipality

Area
  - Total: 0.35 km^{2} (0.14 sq mi)

Population (31 December 2010)
  - Total: 284
  - Density: 815/km^{2} (2,110/sq mi)
- Time zone: UTC+1 (CET)
  - Summer (DST): UTC+2 (CEST)

Jäderfors is a locality situated in Sandviken Municipality, Gävleborg County, Sweden. As of the most recent population data in 2020, Jäderfors had approximately 323 residents.
