= Backberg =

- Location within Sweden Gävleborg Location within Sweden
- Coordinates: 60°37′N 16°37′E
- Country: Sweden
- Province: Gästrikland
- County: Gävleborg County
- Municipality: Sandviken Municipality

Area
  - Total: 0.86 km^{2} (0.33 sq mi)

Population (31 December 2010)
  - Total: 244
  - Density: 284/km^{2} (740/sq mi)
- Time zone: UTC+1 (CET)
  - Summer (DST): UTC+2 (CEST)

Backberg is a locality situated in Sandviken Municipality, Gävleborg County, Sweden with 244 inhabitants in 2010.
