= List of foreign Elitserien players =

This is a list of foreign players in Elitserien, which commenced play in 2007–08. The following players must meet both of the following two criteria:

1. have played at least one Elitserien game. Players who were signed by Elitserien clubs, but only played in lower league, cup and/or European games, or did not play in any competitive games at all, are not included.
2. are considered foreign, determined by the following:

A player is considered foreign if he is not eligible to play for Sweden national bandy team. (Note: More specifically, If a player has been capped on international level, the national team is used; if he has been capped by more than one country, the highest level (or the most recent) team is used.; If a player has not been capped on international level, his country of birth is used, except those who were born abroad from Swedish parents or moved to Sweden at a young age, and those who clearly indicated to have switched his nationality to another nation.; Clubs listed are those which the player has played at least one Elitserien game for.)

Players from the former Soviet Union were able to play in Sweden after the union ceased to exist.

== List of players ==
=== Finland ===
- Ville Aaltonen – Bollnäs – 2008–18
- Mikko Aarni – Sandviken – 2007–14
- Samuli Helavuori – Bollnäs – 2011–18
- Kimmo Kyllönen – Sirius, IFK Kungälv, Tellus, IFK Vänersborg – 2013–18
- Juho Liukkonen – Bollnäs, IFK Vänersborg – 2009–14, 2017–18
- Mikko Lukkarila – Bollnäs, IFK Kungälv, IFK Vänersborg – 2008–18
- Tommi Määttä – Edsbyn – 2016–18
- Tuomas Määttä – Edsbyn – 2016–18

=== Kazakhstan ===
- Aleksandr Dryagin – Sandviken – 2007–08, 2009–10
- Sergey Pochkunov – Frillesås BK – 2019–2022

=== Norway ===
- Felix Callander – IFK Vänersborg – 2017–18
- Nikolai Rustad Jensen – Villa Lidköping – 2017–18
- Markus Fremstad – Frillesås BK – 2021–2022

=== Russia ===
- Pavel Bulatov – IFK Vänersborg – 2016–17
- Alan Dzhusoev – Hammarby – 2017–18
- Ilya Grachev – Sirius, Hammarby – 2012–2014, 2017–18
- Nikita Ivanov – IFK Vänersborg – 2016–17
- Ivan Lebedev – Tillberga, Hammarby – 2015–18
- Sergey Lomanov – IFK Vänersborg – 2016–17
- Ruslan Shuvalov – Hammarby – 2007–08

== See also ==
- List of Elitserien players
- List of foreign Russian Bandy Super League players
