= Åshammar =

- Location within Sweden Gävleborg Location within Sweden
- Coordinates: 60°39′N 16°32′E
- Country: Sweden
- Province: Gästrikland
- County: Gävleborg County
- Municipality: Sandviken Municipality

Area
  - Total: 1.71 km^{2} (0.66 sq mi)

Population (31 December 2010)
  - Total: 727
  - Density: 426/km^{2} (1,100/sq mi)
- Time zone: UTC+1 (CET)
  - Summer (DST): UTC+2 (CEST)

Åshammar is a locality situated in Sandviken Municipality, Gävleborg County, Sweden with 699 inhabitants in 2018.

== Amenities ==
The town's school, Alsjöskolan, has approximately 100 pupils until the third grade. Adjacent to the school there is a nursery with 3 departments. Other amenities include a library, pizza and a supermarket.

== Local businesses ==
Åshammar is home to several small businesses, including a planing mill, window manufacturer and a carpentry. BUMAX AB, which produces fasteners, bolts and screws, is the largest employer in the town.
