= Evgeny Sviridov =

Evgeny Sviridov may refer to:

- Evgeny Sviridov (violinist) (born 1989), Russian violinist
- Evgeni Sviridov (figure skater) (born 1974), Uzbekistani figure skater
- Evgeniy Sviridov (bandy) (born 1974), Belarusian bandy player
