= Västerberg =

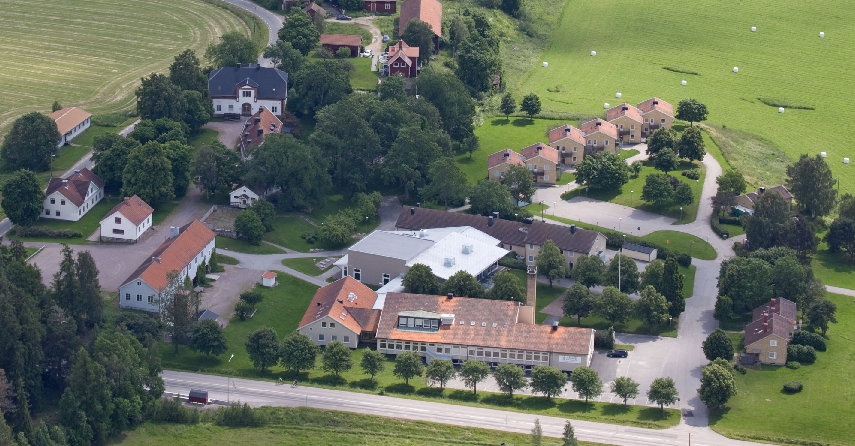

- Location within Sweden Gävleborg Location within Sweden
- Coordinates: 60°36′N 16°33′E
- Country: Sweden
- Province: Gästrikland
- County: Gävleborg County
- Municipality: Sandviken Municipality

Area
  - Total: 0.70 km^{2} (0.27 sq mi)

Population (31 December 2010)
  - Total: 242
  - Density: 345/km^{2} (890/sq mi)
- Time zone: UTC+1 (CET)
  - Summer (DST): UTC+2 (CEST)

Västerberg is a locality situated in Sandviken Municipality, Gävleborg County, Sweden with 205 inhabitants as of 2023.
