= Uppsala Eventcenter =

Multi-purpose indoor arena in Uppsala, Sweden

Coordinates: 59°52′47″N 17°40′23″E

- Interactive map of Uppsala Eventcenter
- Full name: Uppsala Eventcenter
- Former names: Uppsala Arena (2009–2015)
- Capacity: 6,800 (ice hockey)

Construction
- Cost: > 750 million SEK
- Architect: Aros Arkitekter

Tenant
- Almtuna IS

Uppsala Eventcenter is a planned multi-purpose indoor arena in Uppsala, Sweden. Once completed, it will become the ice hockey team Almtuna IS's home arena. It will have a capacity of 6,800 people during ice hockey games.

There have been concerns that building the arena next to Gränby centrum might destroy the habitat of newts. The slope where the arena is planned is thought to function as a dwelling place for newts during winter and is therefore included in a consideration zone (Swedish: hänsynsområde) for newts. Number of small dams have been built in the area previously to avoid the already threatened newts from disappearing from the zone.

Although the arena, as its current name suggests, was intended to be used for other activities than sports, it has since been decided in August 2018 that the arena will only be designed and used for sports.

== See also ==
- List of indoor arenas in Sweden
- List of indoor arenas in Nordic countries
