= Kevin Brown (bandy) =

American bandy player (born 1992)

Personal information
- Date of birth: 18 September 1992 (age 32)

Club information
- Current team: Peace & Love City

Youth career
- Gustavsberg
- Ljusdal

Senior career*
| Years | Team | Apps^{†} | (Gls)^{†} |
| 2009–2014 | Ljusdal | | |
| 2013–2014 | Gustavsberg | | |
| 2014– | Peace & Love City (Note: 2014–2016 as Borlänge/Stora Tuna.) | | |

National team
| 2015– | USA | | |
- * Senior club appearances and goals counted for the domestic league only. † Appearances (Goals).

Kevin Brown (born 18 February 1992) is an American bandy player, playing professionally in clubs in Sweden for many years. He played with Ljusdals BK for six years.

== Career ==
=== Club career ===
Brown is a youth product of Gustavsberg and has represented their senior team and Ljusdal, and Peace & Love City.

=== International career ===
Brown grew up in Sweden but choose to represent United States national bandy team. He was part of the United States national bandy team in the 2015 and 2016 Bandy World Championship

International Team stats: 10 Games, 11 goals

Debut: WC 2015 Russia, Usa-Lattvia 5–2 Bandy in the United States
