= 2017 Bandy World Championship =

XXXVIIth Bandy World Championship

Tournament details
- Host country: Sweden
- Venues: 2 (in 2 host cities)
- Dates: 29 January – 5 February (Division A); 24–28 January (Division B)
- Teams: 8 (Division A) and 10 (Division B)

Final positions
- Champions: Sweden
- Runners-up: Russia
- Third place: Finland
- Fourth place: Norway

Tournament statistics
- Games played: 22 (Division A); 34 (Division B)
- Scoring leader(s): Division A (Norway) Nikolai Rustad Jensen (17 goals); Division B (Mongolia) Roman Murzin (17 goals)

Awards
- MVP: (Sweden) Johan Löfstedt

2017 Bandy World Championship was the 37th Bandy World Championship and was held in Sweden. The games in Division A were played in Göransson Arena in Sandviken, 29 January to 5 February. The games of Division B were played in Slättbergshallen in Trollhättan, 24–28 January. Also Gävle, where no match was played, was officially a host city. However, the FIB congress took place there.

== Participating teams ==
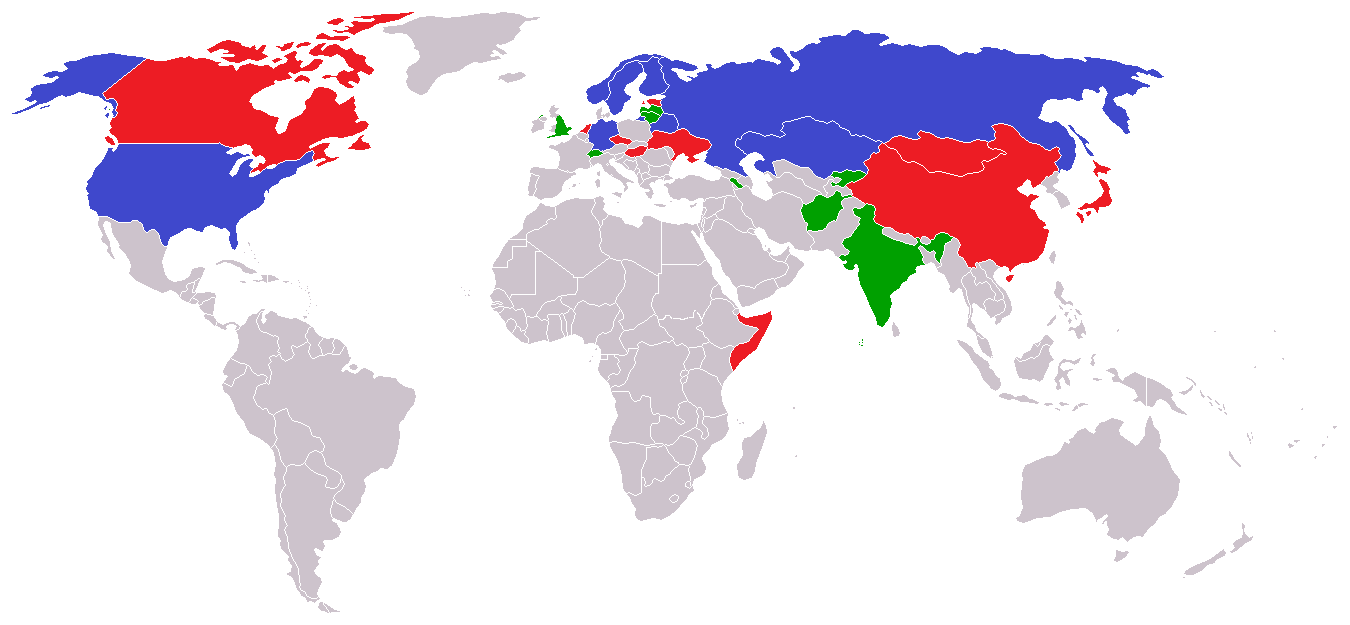
Participating countries in the 2017 Bandy World Championship. Blue: Division A Red: Division B Green: members of the Federation of International Bandy not participating in this year's World Championship

Eight nations competed in Division A. Eleven were originally scheduled to play in Division B, which would have been an all-time high of nineteen. However, Latvia did not compete thus the record set at the 2016 tournament was matched.

=== Division A ===
==== Pool A ====
- Finland
- Kazakhstan
- Russia
- Sweden

==== Pool B ====
- Norway
- Belarus
- Germany
- United States

=== Division B ===
==== Pool A ====
- Hungary
- Japan
- Mongolia
- Ukraine

==== Pool B ====
- Canada
- China
- Czech Republic
- Estonia
- Netherlands
- Somalia

== Arenas ==
| Sandviken | Trollhättan |
|---|---|
| Göransson Arena | Slättbergshallen |
| | No image available |

== Division A ==
=== Preliminary round ===
==== Group A ====
| Pos | Team | Pld | W | D | L | GF | GA | GD | Pts |
|---|---|---|---|---|---|---|---|---|---|
| 1 | Sweden (H) | 3 | 3 | 0 | 0 | 26 | 12 | +14 | 6 |
| 2 | Russia | 3 | 2 | 0 | 1 | 21 | 14 | +7 | 4 |
| 3 | Finland | 3 | 1 | 0 | 2 | 9 | 17 | −8 | 2 |
| 4 | Kazakhstan | 3 | 0 | 0 | 3 | 9 | 22 | −13 | 0 |

(H) Hosts

All times are local (UTC+1).

Game 1
29 January 2017
15:00

| Sweden | 8–2 (5–1) | Finland |
|---|---|---|
| E. Pettersson 4', 24' (p), 71' (p), 73'; A. Gilljam 10'; D. Pizzoni Elfving 28', 74'; D. Mossberg 38' | Report | 41' M. Kumpuoja; 56' V. Aaltonen |

Göransson Arena, Sandviken
Attendance: 2,023
Referee: Pontus Petersson (Norway)
Game 4
30 January 2017
19:00

| Kazakhstan | 2–9 (0–5) | Russia |
|---|---|---|
| A. Vsjivkov 80'; R. Isaliyev 83' | Report | 4', 5', 35', 73' A. Bondarenko; 32', 47' Y. Ivanushkin; 37' A. Dzhushoyev; 49' J. Befus; 58' J. Sjardakov |

Göransson Arena, Sandviken
Attendance: 318
Referee: Jonas Kandell (Sweden)
Game 7
31 January 2017
16:00

| Russia | 6–2 (2–0) | Finland |
|---|---|---|
| A. Dzhushoyev 25'; Y. Ivanushkin 28'; Y. Shardakov 46', 77'; A. Mirgazov 50'; M. Ishkeldin 89' | Report | 51' P. Rintala; 54' R. Larsson |

Göransson Arena, Sandviken
Attendance: 265
Referee: Jonas Kandell (Sweden)
Game 8
31 January 2017
19:00

| Sweden | 8–4 (3–2) | Kazakhstan |
|---|---|---|
| P. Nilsson 13', 82'; D. Andersson 22', 53'; D. Mossberg 38'; C. Edlund 47', 66'; E. Pettersson 80' | Report | 5', 63' S. Pochkunov; 10' O. Pivovarov; 81' A. Nasonov |

Göransson Arena, Sandviken
Attendance: 1,249
Referee: Grigori Minaev (Russia)
Game 11
1 February 2017
16:00

| Kazakhstan | 3–5 (2–1) | Finland |
|---|---|---|
| A. Golubkov 22'; R. Isaliyev 25'; A. Vshivkov 63' | Report | 12' M. Lukkarila; 47' Tu. Määttä; 61' R. Larsson; 75' M. Kumpuoia; 87' M. Rytkönen |

Göransson Arena, Sandviken
Attendance: 332
Referee: Pontus Petersson (Norway)
Game 12
1 February 2017
19:00

| Russia | 6–10 (2–5) | Sweden |
|---|---|---|
| J. Befus 11', 35'; Y. Ivanushkin 53', 77', 93' (p); A. Mirgazov 74' | Report | 13', 88' C. Edlund; 15', 26' E. Pettersson; 18' P. Nilsson; 49' D. Pizzoni Elfving; 57' E. Säfström; 79' J. Löfstedt; 90' P. Hellmyrs |

Göransson Arena, Sandviken
Attendance: 1,909
Referee: Petri Kuusela (Finland)

==== Group B ====
| Pos | Team | Pld | W | D | L | GF | GA | GD | Pts |
|---|---|---|---|---|---|---|---|---|---|
| 1 | Norway | 3 | 3 | 0 | 0 | 35 | 7 | +28 | 6 |
| 2 | United States | 3 | 2 | 0 | 1 | 26 | 17 | +9 | 4 |
| 3 | Belarus | 3 | 0 | 1 | 2 | 13 | 31 | −18 | 1 |
| 4 | Germany | 3 | 0 | 1 | 2 | 14 | 33 | −19 | 1 |

Game 2
30 January 2017
13:00

| United States | 9–4 (5–3) | Germany |
|---|---|---|
| D. Richardson 3'; K. Brown 8', 28'; M. Lickteig 10', 64'; M. Carman 36', 84'; A. Zitouni 78'; J. Blucher 86' | Report | 9', 43' A. Kolyagin; 27', 81' (p) M. Dunaev |

Göransson Arena, Sandviken
Attendance: 210
Referee: Petri Kuusela (Finland)
Game 3
30 January 2017
16:00

| Belarus | 1–10 (0–5) | Norway |
|---|---|---|
| S. Yusupov 87' | Report | 4' (p), 35' (p), 62', 66' (p), 76' N. Jensen; 8', 61' S. Kristoffersen; 25', 40' F. Randsborg; 82' M. Hogevold |

Göransson Arena, Sandviken
Attendance: 269
Referee: Grigori Minaev (Russia)
Game 5
31 January 2017
10:00

| Germany | 7–7 (2–5) | Belarus |
|---|---|---|
| M. Dunaev 11' (p), 78', 86' (p); F. Mironov 16', 82'; A. Kuznetsov 46'; P. Savchenko Jr. 99' | Report | 6' K. Savchenko; 23', 42' M. Azarenko; 29', 94' D. Artemenko; 47' (p) E. Sviridov; 97' S. Yusupov |
Penalties
| | 3–4 |

Göransson Arena, Sandviken
Attendance: 231
Referee: Pontus Petersson (Norway)
Game 6
31 January 2017
13:00

| Norway | 8–3 (3–2) | United States |
|---|---|---|
| C. Randsborg 3'; E. Johnsen 8'; F. Randsborg 29', 68'; N. Jensen 46', 48'; S. Kristoffersen 52', 81' | Report | 12' K. Brown; 24' M. Williams; 86' (p) D. Richardson |

Göransson Arena, Sandviken
Attendance: 231
Referee: Petri Kuusela (Finland)
Game 9
1 February 2017
10:00

| Germany | 3–17 (3–8) | Norway |
|---|---|---|
| F. Mironov 37'; M. Dunaev 39'; S. Naab 43' | Report | 8' (pen), 10', 19', 27', 32', 47', 75' N. Jensen; 15' E. Johnsen; 29', 63', 74' S. Kristoffersen; 31' K. Hagen; 48', 89', 90', 92' F. Callander; 72' M. Hogevold |

Göransson Arena, Sandviken
Attendance: 279
Referee: Grigori Minaev (Russia)
Game 10
1 February 2017
13:00

| Belarus | 5–14 (3–7) | United States |
|---|---|---|
| | Report |

Göransson Arena, Sandviken
Attendance: 145
Referee: Jonas Kandell (Sweden)

=== Knockout stage ===
Quarter-finals
2 February – Sandviken
Kazakhstan | 4
Norway | 5
2 February – Sandviken
Sweden | 34
Germany | 6
2 February – Sandviken
Finland | 15
United States | 1
2 February – Sandviken
Russia | 17
Belarus | 0

Semi-finals
4 February – Sandviken
Norway | 2
Sweden | 17
4 February – Sandviken
Finland | 4
Russia | 6

Final
5 February – Sandviken
Sweden | 4
Russia | 3
Third place
5 February – Sandviken
Finland | 11
Norway | 1

==== Quarterfinals ====
Game 13
2 February 2017
10:00

| Kazakhstan | 4–5 (OT) (4–0) | Norway |
|---|---|---|
| | Report |

Göransson Arena, Sandviken
Attendance: 364
Referee: Jonas Kandell (Sweden)
Game 14
2 February 2017
13:00

| Finland | 15–1 (8–1) | United States |
|---|---|---|
| | Report |

Göransson Arena, Sandviken
Attendance: 382
Referee: Grigori Minaev (Russia)
Game 15
2 February 2017
16:00

| Sweden | 34–6 (17–2) | Germany |
|---|---|---|
| | Report |

Göransson Arena, Sandviken
Attendance: 1,095
Referee: Petri Kuusela (Finland)
Game 16
2 February 2017
19:00

| Russia | 17–0 (6–0) | Belarus |
|---|---|---|
| | Report |

Göransson Arena, Sandviken
Attendance: 234
Referee: Pontus Petersson (Norway)

==== 7th place game ====
Game 19
4 February 2017
10:00

| Germany | 12–7 (4–3) | Belarus |
|---|---|---|
| | Report |

Göransson Arena, Sandviken
Attendance: 67
Referee: Pietri Kuusela (Finland)

==== 5th place game ====
Game 20
4 February 2017
13:00

| Kazakhstan | 10–4 (4–2) | United States |
|---|---|---|
| | Report |

Göransson Arena, Sandviken
Attendance: 270
Referee: Pontus Petersson (Norway)

==== Semifinals ====
Game 18
4 February 2017
16:00

| Norway | 2–17 (0–8) | Sweden |
|---|---|---|
| N. Rustad Jensen 64'; E.B. Johnsen 72' | Report | 3', 33' (p) E. Pettersson; 10', 23', 77' J. Löfstedt; 29', 78' D. Andersson; 34', 40', 63', 80' C. Edlund; 52', 57' A. Gilljam; 54' P. Nilsson; 68' D. Berlin; 74' D. Mossberg |

Göransson Arena, Sandviken
Attendance: 2,510
Referee: Grigori Minaev (Russia)
Game 17
4 February 2017
19:00

| Finland | 4–6 (1–3) | Russia |
|---|---|---|
| M. Lukkarila 31'; P. Rintala 53'; M. Rytkönen 83'; J. Liukkonen 84' | Report | 26', 37' A. Dzhusoev; 29' J. Befus; 51' A. Mirgazov; 81' A. Bondarenko; 87' Y. Shardakov |

Göransson Arena, Sandviken
Attendance: 891
Referee: Jonas Kandell (Sweden)

==== Third place game ====
Game 21
5 February 2017
12:00

| Finland | 11–1 (4–1) | Norway |
|---|---|---|
| J. Liukkonen 03', 29', 46'; M. Kumpuoja 11'; P. Rintala 26', 76', 89'; Te. Määttä 53'; M. Rytkönen 63' (p); S. Helavuori 79'; Tu. Määttä 87' | Report | 8' N. Rustad Jensen |

Göransson Arena, Sandviken
Attendance: 384
Referee: Grigori Minaev (Russia)

==== Final ====
Game 22
5 February 2017
16:00

| Sweden | 4–3 (1–3) | Russia |
|---|---|---|
| D. Mossberg 23'; C. Edlund 61'; E. Pettersson 84'; A. Gilljam 91' | Report | 20' J. Befus; 42' Y. Ivanushkin; 43' A. Mirgazov |

Göransson Arena, Sandviken
Attendance: 2,888
Referee: Petri Kuusela (Finland)

=== Final standings ===
| Gold medal | Sweden |
| Silver medal | Russia |
| Bronze medal | Finland |
| 4 | Norway |
| 5 | Kazakhstan |
| 6 | United States |
| 7 | Germany |
| 8 | Belarus ▼ |

Belarus is relegated and will be playing in Division B in the 2018 Bandy World Championship.

== Division B ==
=== Preliminary round ===
==== Group A ====
| Pos | Team | Pld | W | D | L | GF | GA | GD | Pts | Qualification |
|---|---|---|---|---|---|---|---|---|---|---|
| 1 | Mongolia | 3 | 3 | 0 | 0 | 28 | 13 | +15 | 6 | Quarterfinals |
| 2 | Hungary | 3 | 2 | 0 | 1 | 23 | 12 | +11 | 4 | Quarterfinals |
| 3 | Japan | 3 | 1 | 0 | 2 | 8 | 19 | −11 | 2 | Quarterfinals |
| 4 | Ukraine | 3 | 0 | 0 | 3 | 11 | 26 | −15 | 0 | Quarterfinals |

Updated to match(es) played on completed. Source:
24 January 2017

| Hungary | 7–0 | Japan |

Slättbergshallen, Trollhättan
24 January 2017

| Ukraine | 6–9 | Mongolia |

Slättbergshallen, Trollhättan
25 January 2017

| Japan | 2–10 | Mongolia |

Slättbergshallen, Trollhättan
25 January 2017

| Hungary | 11–3 | Ukraine |

Slättbergshallen, Trollhättan
26 January 2017

| Japan | 6–2 | Ukraine |

Slättbergshallen, Trollhättan
26 January 2017

| Mongolia | 9–5 | Hungary |

Slättbergshallen, Trollhättan

==== Group B ====
Matches in Group B are 60 minutes in duration rather than the standard 90 minutes.

| Pos | Team | Pld | W | D | L | GF | GA | GD | Pts | Qualification |
|---|---|---|---|---|---|---|---|---|---|---|
| 1 | Canada | 5 | 4 | 1 | 0 | 43 | 3 | +40 | 9 | Quarterfinals |
| 2 | Estonia | 5 | 4 | 0 | 1 | 26 | 12 | +14 | 8 | Quarterfinals |
| 3 | Czech Republic | 5 | 2 | 2 | 1 | 32 | 11 | +21 | 6 | Quarterfinals |
| 4 | Netherlands | 5 | 2 | 1 | 2 | 27 | 12 | +15 | 5 | Quarterfinals |
| 5 | China | 5 | 1 | 0 | 4 | 11 | 37 | −26 | 2 | 7–10th place semifinals |
| 6 | Somalia | 5 | 0 | 0 | 5 | 4 | 68 | −64 | 0 | 7–10th place semifinals |

24 January 2017

| Czech Republic | 3–3 | Netherlands |

Slättbergshallen, Trollhättan
24 January 2017

| Estonia | 11–1 | China |

Slättbergshallen, Trollhättan
24 January 2017

| Somalia | 0–15 | Canada |

Slättbergshallen, Trollhättan
24 January 2017

| Netherlands | 6–0 | China |

Slättbergshallen, Trollhättan
24 January 2017

| Somalia | 0–20 | Czech Republic |

Slättbergshallen, Trollhättan
25 January 2017

| Estonia | 0–8 | Canada |

Slättbergshallen, Trollhättan
25 January 2017

| Somalia | 1–7 | China |

Slättbergshallen, Trollhättan
25 January 2017

| Netherlands | 2–3 | Estonia |

Slättbergshallen, Trollhättan
25 January 2017

| Czech Republic | 3–3 | Canada |

Slättbergshallen, Trollhättan
25 January 2017

| Netherlands | 16–3 | Somalia |

Slättbergshallen, Trollhättan
26 January 2017

| Canada | 13–0 | China |

Slättbergshallen, Trollhättan
26 January 2017

| Czech Republic | 1–2 | Estonia |

Slättbergshallen, Trollhättan
26 January 2017

| Canada | 4–0 | Netherlands |

Slättbergshallen, Trollhättan
26 January 2017

| Estonia | 10–0 | Somalia |

Slättbergshallen, Trollhättan
26 January 2017

| China | 3–6 | Czech Republic |

Slättbergshallen, Trollhättan

=== Play-off ===
Quarter-finals
27 January
Hungary | 10
Czech Republic | 1
27 January
Japan | 5
Estonia | 0
27 January
Mongolia | 6
Netherlands | 2
27 January
Ukraine | 2
Canada | 7

Semi-finals
27 January
Hungary | 4
Japan | 3
27 January
Mongolia | 3
Canada | 4

Final
28 January
Hungary | 3
Canada | 4
Third place
28 January
Japan | 5
Mongolia | 6

| 5th place |
| 28 January |
| Estonia | 6 |
| Ukraine | 8 |

7–10th place semifinals
27 January
Netherlands | 7
China | 1
27 January
Czech Republic | 19
Somalia | 0

7th place
28 January
Netherlands | 3
Czech Republic | 2
9th place
28 January
China | 14
Somalia | 0

=== Final standings ===
| 1. | Canada |
| 2. | Hungary |
| 3. | Mongolia |
| 4. | Japan |
| 5. | Ukraine |
| 6. | Estonia |
| 7. | Netherlands |
| 8. | Czech Republic |
| 9. | China |
| 10. | Somalia |

Canada is promoted and will be playing in Division A in the 2018 Bandy World Championship.

== Broadcasting ==
- Russia: Match TV
- Sweden: Kanal 5, Eurosport 2
