= Christoffer Fagerström =

Swedish bandy player

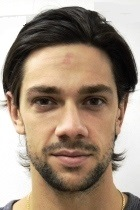

Personal information
- Date of birth: 29 September 1992 (age 32)
- Playing position: Forward

Club information
- Current team: Baykal-Energiya

Youth career
- Vargön

Senior career*
Years	Team	Apps^{†}	(Gls)^{†}
2007–2008	Vargön		
2008–2016	IFK Vänersborg		
2017–2019	Hammarby IF		
2019–2020	Bollnäs GIF		
2020–2021	Hammarby IF		
2021–	Baykal-Energiya		

National team
- Sweden
Medal record
Men's bandy
Representing Sweden
World Championships
Gold medal – first place	2025 Lidköping	Team
Silver medal – second place	2018 Khabarovsk	Team
- * Senior club appearances and goals counted for the domestic league only. † Appearances (Goals).

Christoffer Fagerström (born 29 September 1992 in Vänersborg) is a Swedish bandy player.

== Career ==
=== Club career ===
Westh is a youth product of Vargön and represented their senior team before moving to IFK Vänersborg in 2008. With IFK Vänersborg, he won the Swedish Under 20 Championship.

In 2017, he joined Hammarby.

=== International career ===
Fagerström was part of Sweden's 2010 Under 19 World Championship winning team at the age of 19. He was also part of the silver medalist team of the 2011 Under 23 World Championship.
