= Göransson Arena =

Indoor arena in Sandviken, Sweden

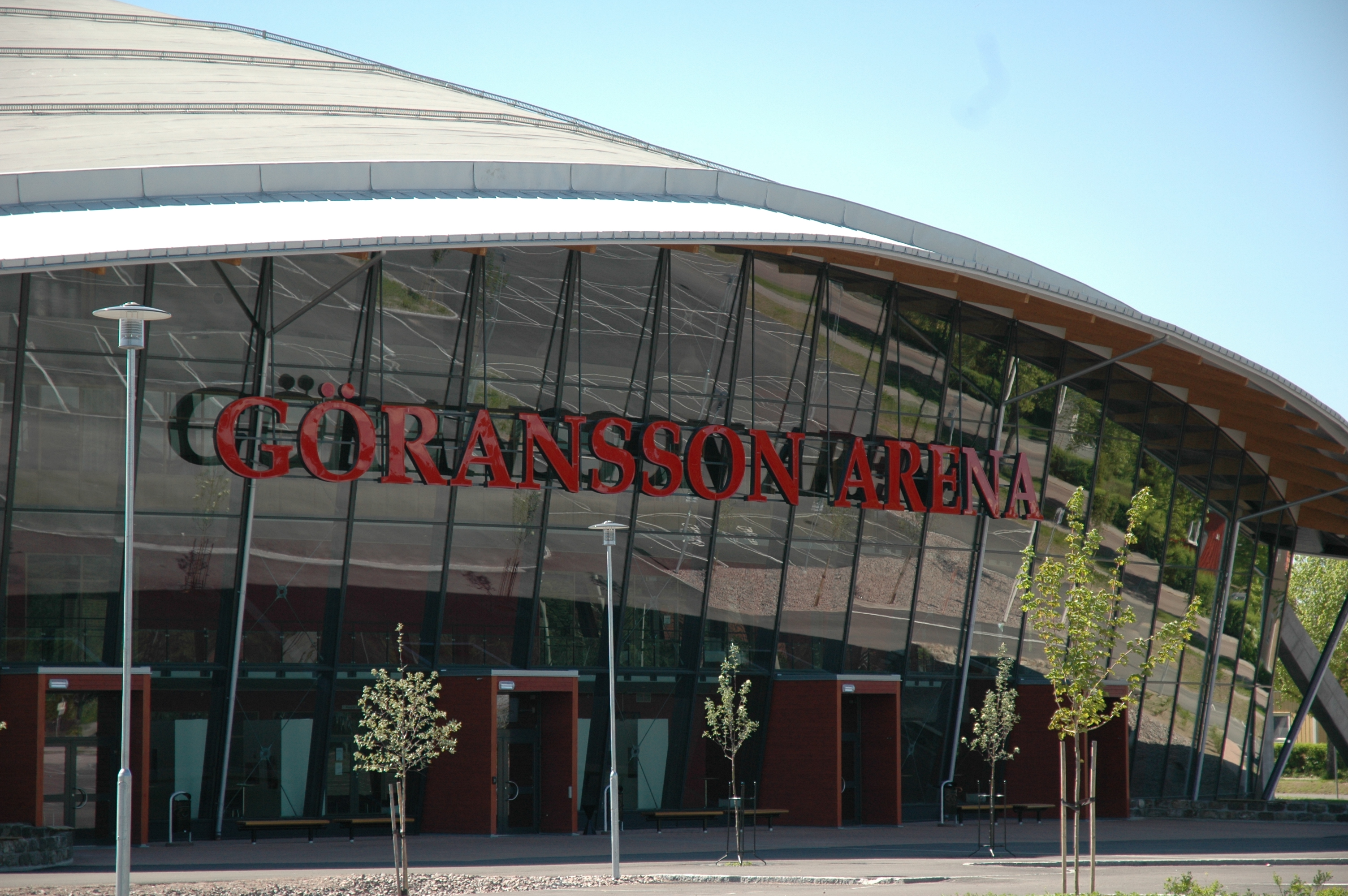
- Interactive map of Göransson Arena
- Location: Sandviken, Sweden
- Coordinates: 60°36′30″N 16°46′10″E
- Owner: Göransson Arena AB
- Capacity: Bandy: 4,000; Concerts: 10,000

Construction
- Groundbreaking: May 2007
- Opened: 30 May 2009
- Cost: SEK 210 million EUR € 22,5 million
- Architect: Håkan Wikström

Tenant
- Sandvikens AIK (2009–present)

Website
- goranssonarena.se

Göransson Arena is an indoor arena in Sandviken, Sweden. It opened in 2009 and holds up to 10,000 people at music events and 4,000 spectators for bandy.

== History ==
The building of the arena was financed by the Göransson Foundations, established by Göran Fredrik Göransson who founded the Sandvik corporation. It was then sold to Sandviken Municipality for a symbolic sum of 1 SEK.

It is the home arena for the bandy team Sandvikens AIK and the Bandy World Cup has been played there since 2009. The A Division of the 2017 Bandy World Championship was also played in the arena.

The second Semi-Final of Melodifestivalen 2010 took place there.

International, multi-platinum pop singer Britney Spears performed to a sold out crowd at the arena as a part of her Piece of Me Tour on August 11, 2018.

== See also ==
- Bandy
- Göran Fredrik Göransson
- List of indoor arenas in Sweden

Events and tenants
Preceded by Trud Stadium; Ulyanovsk	Bandy World Championship; Final Venue; 2017	Succeeded by Arena Yerofey; Khabarovsk
