= Arena Vänersborg =

Indoor arena in Vänersborg, Sweden

Coordinates: 58°21′56″N 12°19′46″E

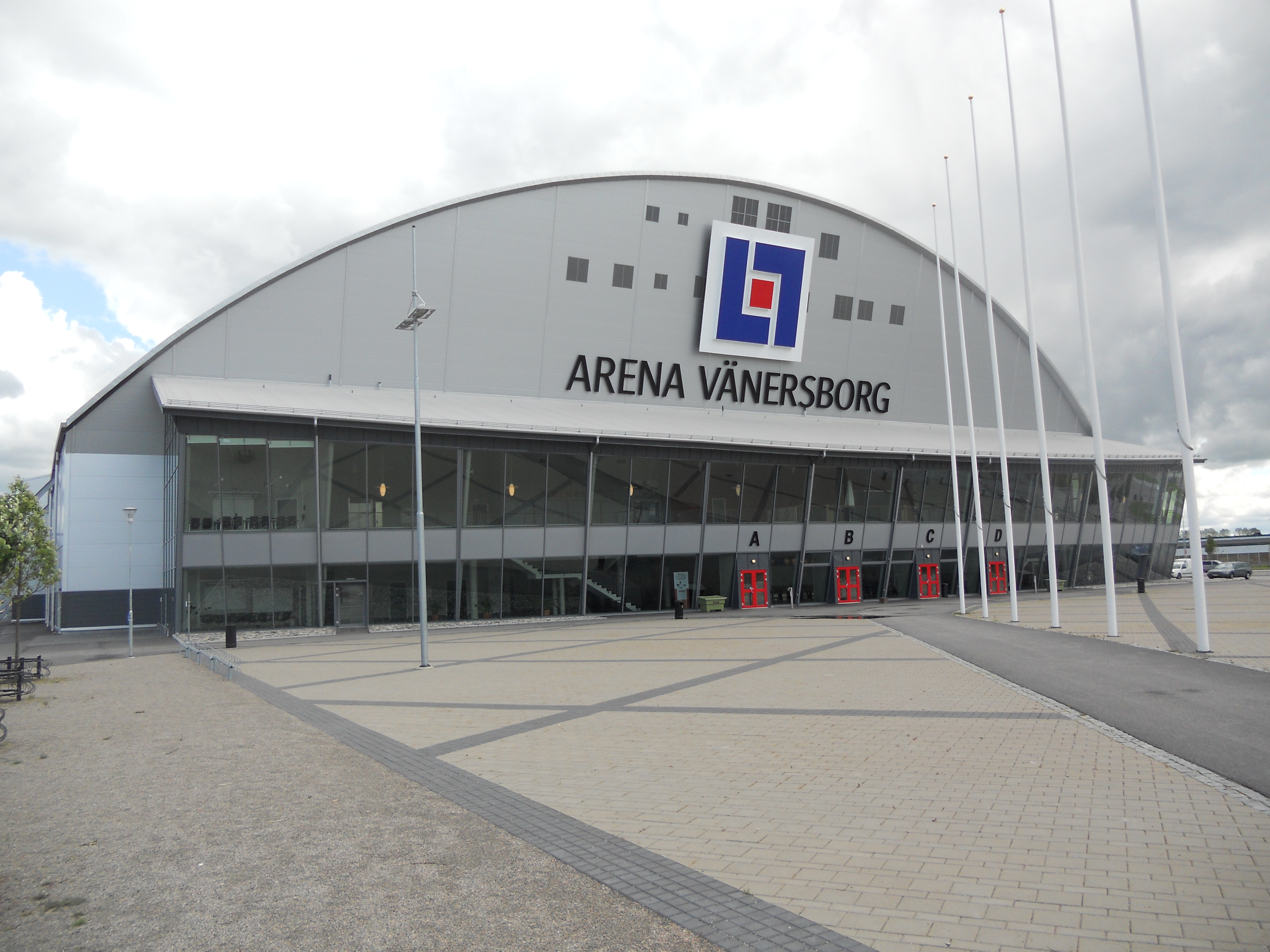
- Interactive map of Arena Vänersborg
- Location: Vänersborg, Sweden
- Owner: Vänersborgs kommun
- Capacity: 5,700; 10,650 for concerts
- Field size: Ground area: 8,000 m^{2} Arena: >12,000 m^{2} Length: 146 m; Width: 100 m; Height: 28 m

Construction
- Opened: 24 September 2009
- Cost: SEK 275 million

Arena Vänersborg is an indoor arena in Vänersborg, Sweden. It is used for bandy, concerts and other events.

The arena is the home of IFK Vänersborg. It hosted the 2013 Bandy World Championship, when Division A and Division B were separate events for the second time. The arena also hosted the 2019 Bandy World Championship.

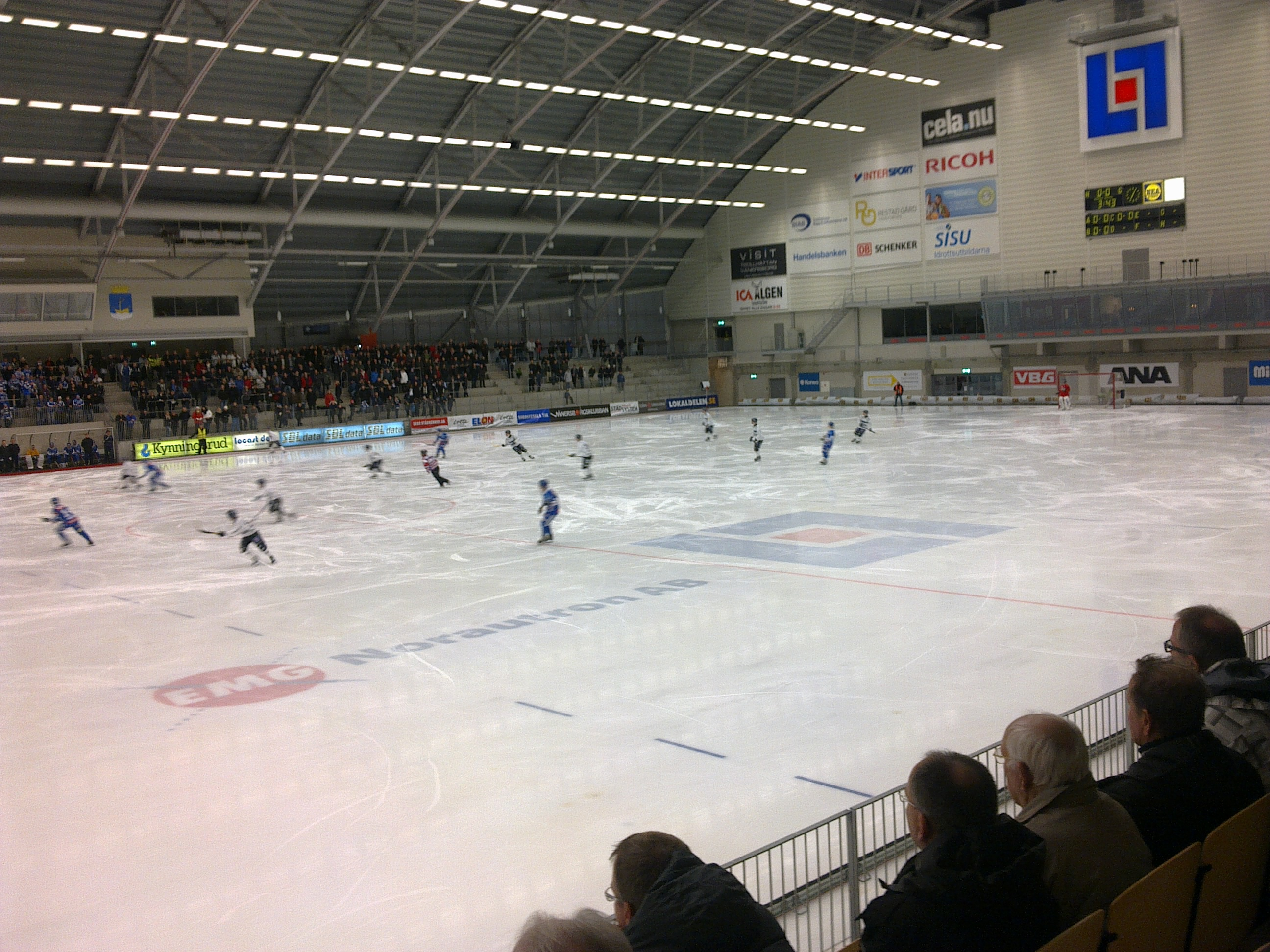
Interior of Arena Vänersborg

The arena has been the target of high local press attention because of the high cost overrun. The city has approved a cost of just over SEK 100 million, although the end cost was around SEK 230 million (US$30 million).

Events and tenants
Preceded by Medeu; Almaty	Bandy World Championship; Final Venue; 2013	Succeeded by Trud Stadium; Irkutsk
Preceded by Arena Yerofey; Khabarovsk	Bandy World Championship; Final Venue; 2019	Succeeded by TDB
