= Patrik Nilsson =

Swedish bandy player (born 1982)

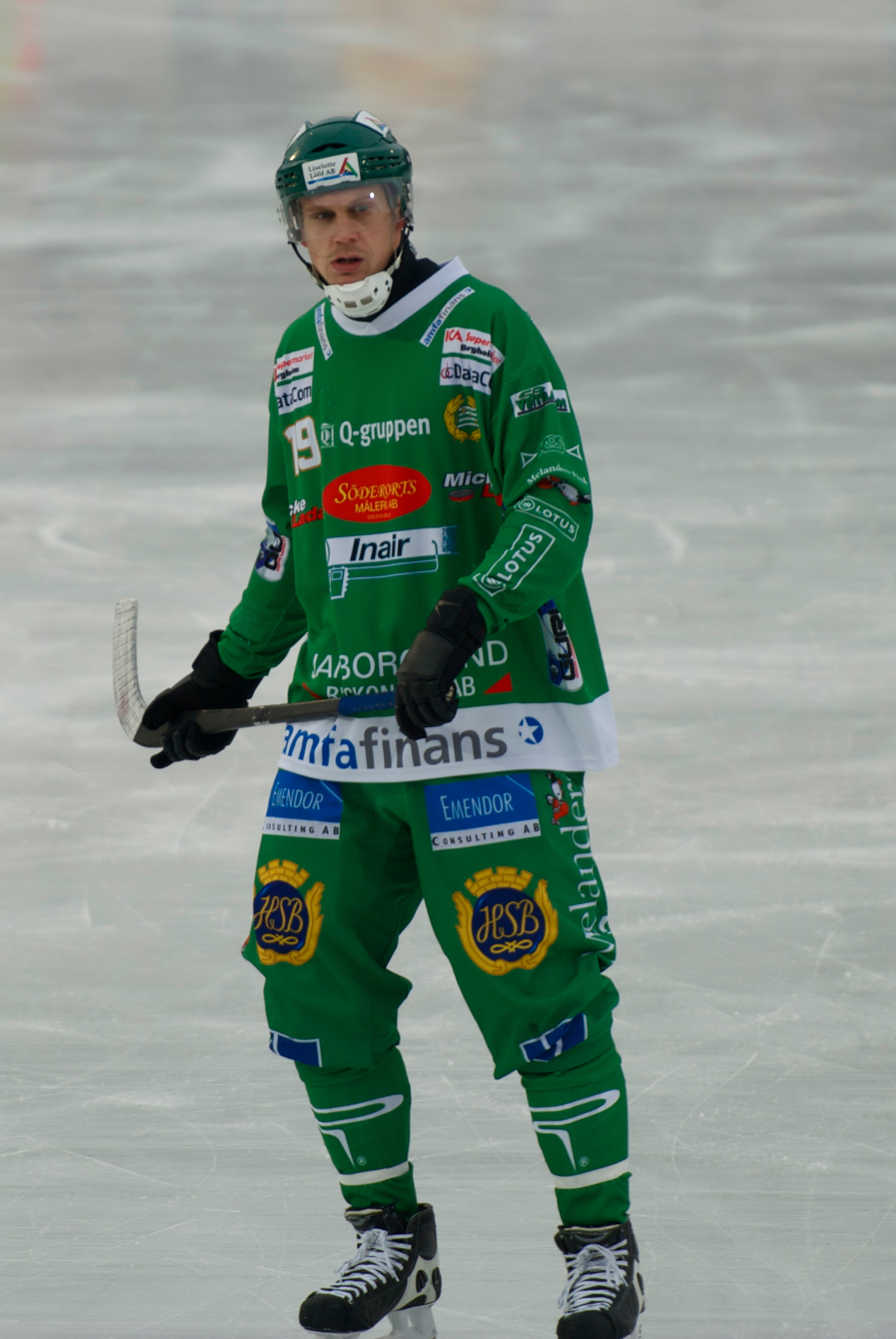
- Patrik Nilsson playing for Hammarby IF in February 2012.

Personal information
- Date of birth: 15 March 1982 (age 43)
- Playing position: Forward

Club information
- Current team: AIK Bandy
- Number: 19

Senior career*
Years	Team	Apps^{†}	(Gls)^{†}
1997–2000	Söderfors GoIF		
2000–2008	Borlänge-Stora Tuna BK		
2008–2009	Dynamo Kazan		
2009–2012	Hammarby IF		
2012–2013	Zorky		
2013–2014	Hammarby IF		
2014–2016	Sandvikens AIK		
2016–2019	Bollnäs GIF		
Medal record
Men's bandy
Representing Sweden
World Championships
Gold medal – first place	2003 Arkhangelsk	Team
Gold medal – first place	2009 Västerås	Team
Gold medal – first place	2010 Moscow	Team
Gold medal – first place	2017 Sandviken	Team
Silver medal – second place	2013 Sweden/Norway	Team
Silver medal – second place	2014 Irkutsk	Team
Silver medal – second place	2015 Khabarovsk	Team
- * Senior club appearances and goals counted for the domestic league only. † Appearances (Goals).

Patrik Nilsson (born 15 March 1982) is a Swedish bandy player, currently with Sandvikens AIK in the Swedish Elitserien.

== Career ==
Nilsson started playing bandy at Söderfors GoIF but left to play in the top division at Sandvikens AIK. He has played for the Swedish national bandy team. All of his appearances have been while he was a Sandvikens AIK player. Nilsson was a member of the Sandvikens AIK squads that won the Swedish Championship in the 2001–02 and 2002–03 seasons and he was also a member of the Bandy World Cup winning squad in 2001–02 season.

He was the top scorer in the 2006–07 and the 2007–08 top division seasons with 70 and 94 goals respectively. On 26 February 2008, after scoring five goals in a playoff game against Motala, Nilsson set a milestone by exceeding 100 goals in one season.

After the great season with SAIK, he went on to play in the Russian League for Kazan. After a season with trouble in Russia he returned to Sweden but this time to Hammarby IF Bandy. Nilsson signed a one-year contract with the club with an option for a second.

On 8 February 2022, he announced his retirement from bandy following the 2021–2022 season.
