= David Pizzoni Elfving =

Swedish bandy player (born 1985)

Personal information
- Date of birth: 26 November 1985 (age 39)
- Height: 188 cm (6 ft 2 in)
- Playing position: Midfielder

Club information
- Current team: Hammarby
- Number: 11

Youth career
- Gustavsbergs IF

Senior career*
Years	Team	Apps^{†}	(Gls)^{†}
2001–2002	Berget BK		
2003–2007	Sandvikens AIK		
2007–	Hammarby IF		

National team
- Sweden
Medal record
Men's bandy
Representing Sweden
World Championships
Gold medal – first place	2017 Sandviken	Team
Silver medal – second place	2014 Irkutsk	Team
Silver medal – second place	2018 Khabarovsk	Team
- * Senior club appearances and goals counted for the domestic league only. † Appearances (Goals).

David Pizzoni Elfving (born 26 November 1985) is a Swedish bandy player who plays for Hammarby IF and the Sweden national team as a midfielder.

== Career ==
=== Club career ===
Pizzoni Elfving is a youth product of Gustavsbergs IF. He represented Berget BK and Sandvikens AIK, before joining and Hammarby IF in 2007.

He won the Swedish championship with Hammarby IF in 2010 and 2013.

=== International career ===
Pizzoni Elfving won the 2017 World Championship with Sweden.

== Honours ==
=== Club ===
Hammarby IF

- Swedish Championship: 2010, 2013
- World Cup: 2009
- Svenska Cupen: 2013, 2014

=== Country ===
Sweden

- Bandy World Championship: 2017
