= Erik Pettersson (bandy, born 1995) =

Swedish bandy forward (born 1995)

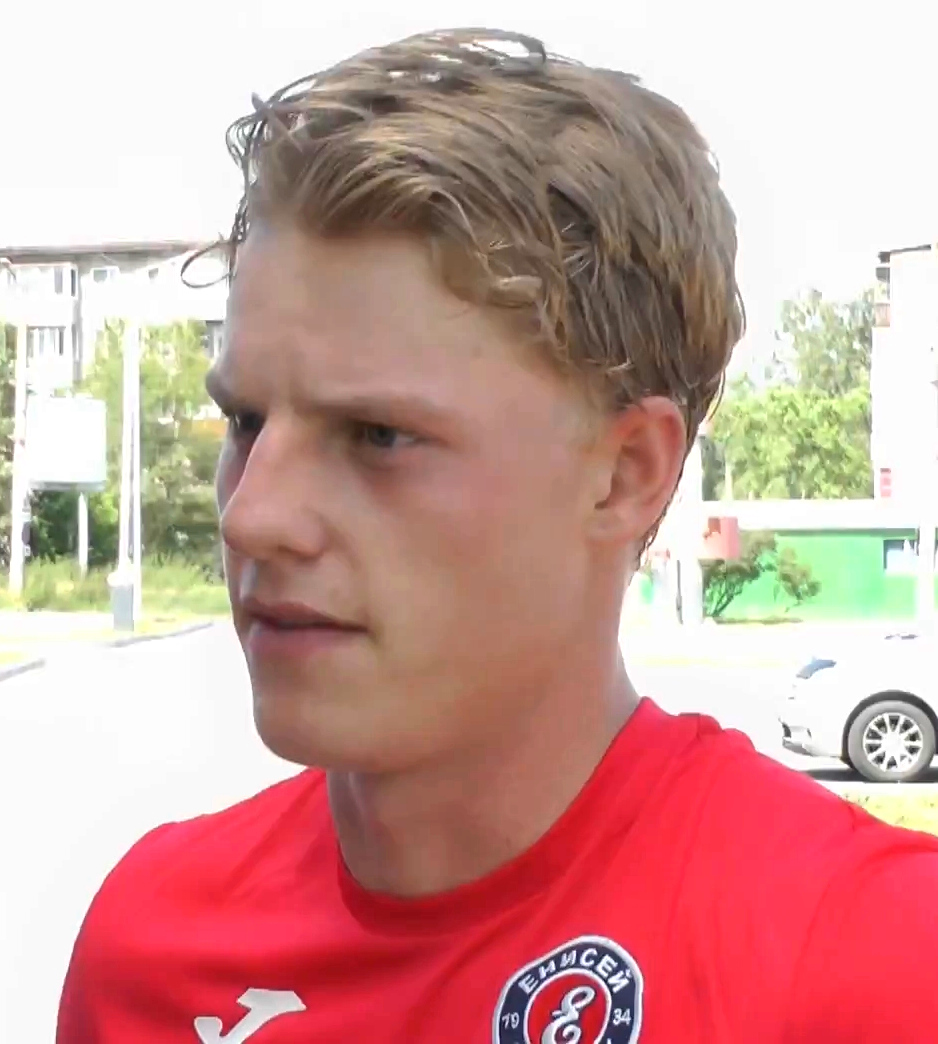
- Pettersson in 2017

Personal information
- Date of birth: 22 July 1995 (age 29)
- Place of birth: Söderfors, Sweden
- Playing position: Forward

Club information
- Current team: Bollnäs

Youth career
- Söderfors

Senior career*
Years	Team	Apps^{†}	(Gls)^{†}
2009–2010	Söderfors		
2010–2017	Sandviken		
2017–2018	Yenisey		
2018-2020	SKA-Neftyanik		
2020-2022	AIK Bandy		
2022-	Bollnäs GIF		

National team
- Sweden
Medal record
Men's bandy
Representing Sweden
World Championships
Gold medal – first place	2017 Sandviken	Team
Silver medal – second place	2014 Irkutsk	Team
Silver medal – second place	2018 Khabarovsk	Team
- * Senior club appearances and goals counted for the domestic league only. † Appearances (Goals).

Per Gustav Erik Pettersson (born 22 July 1995) is a Swedish bandy forward, currently playing for Bollnäs GIF.

== Career ==
=== Club career ===
Pettersson is a youth product of Söderfors GoIF, which he left for Sandvikens AIK and made his debut during the 2010–11 Elitserien season.

In 2017, Pettersson joined Yenisey Krasnoyarsk.

=== International career ===
Pettersson was part of the 2017 Bandy World Championship winning team.

== Honours ==
=== Country ===
Sweden

- Bandy World Championship: 2017
