= Martin Johansson (bandy) =

Swedish professional bandy player (born 1987)

Personal information
- Date of birth: 20 July 1987 (age 37)
- Playing position: Defender

Club information
- Current team: Villa Lidköping
- Number: 24

Senior career*
| Years | Team | Apps^{†} | (Gls)^{†} |
| 2003–2008 | Otterbäcken | | |
| 2008– | Villa Lidköping | | |

National team
- Sweden
Medal record
Men's bandy
Representing Sweden
World Championships
| Gold medal – first place | 2017 Sandviken | Team |
| Silver medal – second place | 2014 Irkutsk | Team |
| Silver medal – second place | 2018 Khabarovsk | Team |
- * Senior club appearances and goals counted for the domestic league only. † Appearances (Goals).

Martin Johansson (born 20 July 1987) is a Swedish professional bandy player.

== Career ==
=== Club career ===
Johansson has represented Otterbäcken and Villa Lidköping.

=== International career ===
Johansson was selected for the national team in 2013. He was part of Swedish World Champions teams of 2017.

== Honours ==
=== Country ===
Sweden

- Bandy World Championship: 2017
