= Daniel Mossberg =

Swedish bandy player

Personal information
- Date of birth: 19 April 1981 (age 43)
- Playing position: Midfielder

Club information
- Current team: AIK

Senior career*
Years	Team	Apps^{†}	(Gls)^{†}
1998–2006	Sandvikens AIK		
2006–2008	Zorky		
2008–2011	Sandvikens AIK		
2011–2014	Dynamo Moscow		
2014–2019	Sandvikens AIK		
2019–2020	Bollnäs GIF		
2020–2021	Hammarby IF		
2021–	AIK		

National team
- Sweden
Medal record
Men's bandy
Representing Sweden
World Championships
Gold medal – first place	2009 Västerås	Team
Gold medal – first place	2010 Moscow	Team
Gold medal – first place	2012 Almaty	Team
Gold medal – first place	2017 Sandviken	Team
Gold medal – first place	2009 Västerås	Team
Silver medal – second place	2007 Kemerovo	Team
Silver medal – second place	2015 Khabarovsk	Team
- * Senior club appearances and goals counted for the domestic league only. † Appearances (Goals).

Daniel Mossberg (born 19 April 1981) is a Swedish professional bandy midfielder.

== Career ==
Mossberg has played most of his career for Sandvikens AIK, but has also spent a number of seasons with different Russian clubs, Zorky (2006–08) and Dynamo Moscow (2011–14).

In 2007, Mossberg signed for Raketa, but the contract was terminated when Raketa went out of money, and Mossberg rejoined Zorky.

In the 2010 Bandy World Championship, he scored the golden goal in the final, giving the game to Sweden with 6–5 against Russia.

== Honours ==
=== Individual ===
- Årets man (1): 2017
