= Evgeniy Sviridov (bandy) =

Belarusian bandy player

Evgeniy Vasilyevich Sviridov (Russian: Евгений Васильевич Свиридов; born 1974) is a professional bandy player from Belarus. He has been playing for Sibselmash Novosibirsk in the Russian Bandy Super League and represented his native Belarus in a number of Bandy World Championships.
