= Gustavsbergs IF =

- City: Gustavsberg, Sweden
- League: Allsvenskan
- Founded: 1906; 119 years ago
- Home arena: Ekvallen

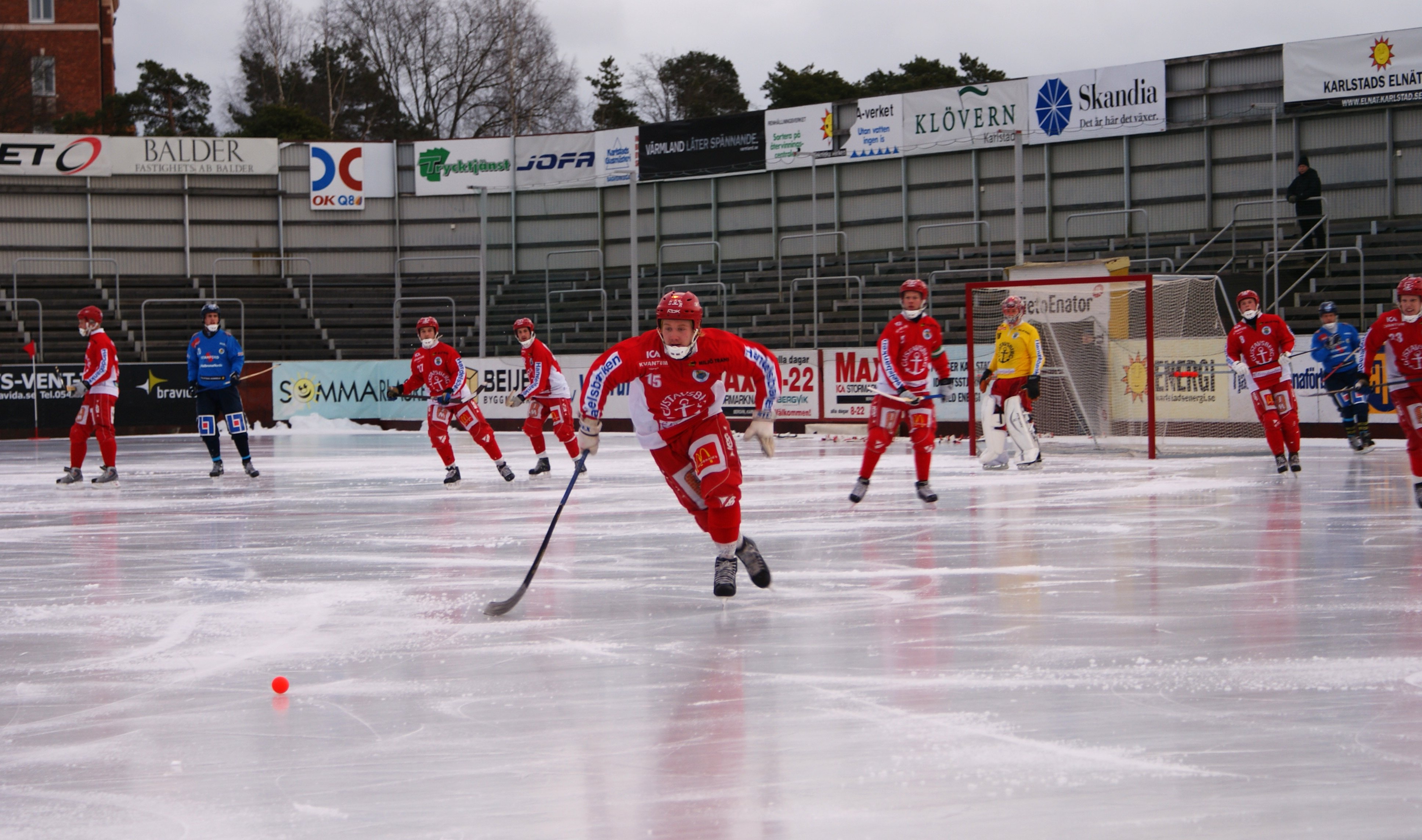
Gustavsbergs IF wears red playing bandy.

Gustavsbergs Idrottsförening, commonly known as Gustavsbergs IF or, especially locally, Gurra, is a multi-sport club in Gustavsberg, Värmdö Municipality, in Sweden, founded in 1906.

The bandy team of the club has regularly been playing in Allsvenskan, the second-level league of bandy in Sweden, since the inauguration of the modern Allsvenskan in 2007. The team was relegated to Division 1 for the 2011–12 season but got a promotion to Allsvenskan again for the next season.
