= Slättbergshallen =

Sports venue in Trollhättan, Sweden

Coordinates: 58.2789°N 12.3000°E

- Interactive map of Slättbergshallen
- Location: Trollhättan, Sweden
- Owner: Trollhättan Municipality
- Capacity: 4,000
- Type: Indoor bandy venue, indoor ice hockey rink

Construction
- Opened: 14 November 2009

Tenants
- Gripen Trollhättan BK; SK Trollhättan; Trollhättan Goblins; Trollhättans konståkningsförening

Slättbergshallen is a sports venue for ice sports in Trollhättan, Sweden. It opened on 14 November 2009. It consists of one indoor venue with a bandy field, which holds 3,400 people, but can hold 4,000 at bigger events, and two indoor venues with ice hockey rinks, one with a spectator capacity of around 2,000 and one without.

The arena hosted a four-nation bandy tournament in December 2016 and the Division B matches at the 2017 Bandy World Championship.
