= Adam Gilljam =

Swedish professional bandy player (born 1990)

Personal information
- Date of birth: 8 July 1990 (age 34)

Club information
- Current team: Hammarby
- Number: 40

Youth career
- Broberg

Senior career*
Years	Team	Apps^{†}	(Gls)^{†}
2006–2012	Broberg		
2012–2020	Hammarby		
2020–2022	Yenisey		
2022-	Hammarby		

National team
- Sweden U15
- Sweden U17
- Sweden U19
- Sweden
Medal record
Men's bandy
Representing Sweden
World Championships
Gold medal – first place	2017 Sandviken	Team
Silver medal – second place	2018 Khabarovsk	Team
- * Senior club appearances and goals counted for the domestic league only. † Appearances (Goals).

Ulf Adam Mustonen Gilljam (born 8 July 1990) is a Swedish professional bandy player.

== Career ==
=== Club career ===
Gilljam is a youth product of Broberg and played for their senior team until 2012, when he joined Hammarby.

In 2014, he was named "Årets komet" ("Comet of the year") in Swedish bandy.

=== International career ===
Gilljam was part of Swedish World Champions teams of 2017. He made a significant contribution when he scored the decisive goal in the 91st minute in the final against Russia.

== Honours ==
=== Country ===
Sweden

- Bandy World Championship: 2017
