= Sandviken =

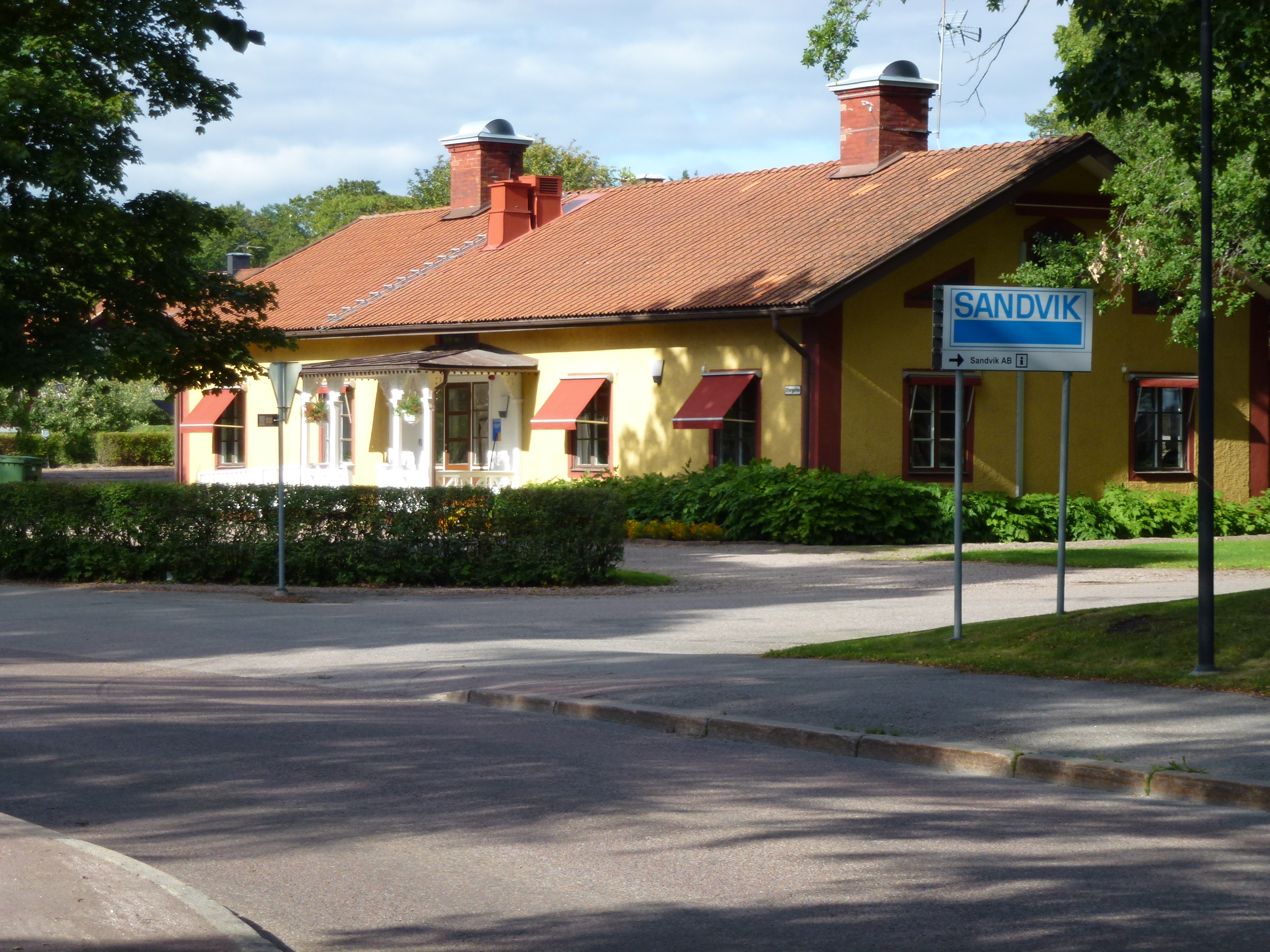
- Central Sandviken

- Coat of arms

- Location within Sweden Gävleborg Location within Sweden
- Coordinates: 60°37′N 16°47′E
- Country: Sweden
- Province: Gästrikland
- County: Gävleborg County
- Municipality: Sandviken Municipality

Area
  - Total: 16.8 km^{2} (6.5 sq mi)

Population (31 December 2020)
  - Total: 25,344 (Urban Areas)
  - Density: 15.08/km^{2} (39.1/sq mi)
- Time zone: UTC+1 (CET)
  - Summer (DST): UTC+2 (CEST)
- Website: http://www.sandviken.se/

Sandviken is a locality and the seat of Sandviken Municipality in Gävleborg County, Sweden with 26,438 inhabitants in 2023. It is situated about 25 km west of Gävle and lies approximately 190 km north of Stockholm. The rail journey to Stockholm takes about 1.5 hours and to Arlanda, Sweden's main international airport, around an hour.

Sandviken is the home town of the major high-technology Swedish engineering concern Sandvik and the main office of the company was located in Sandviken until January 2012 when it was moved to Stockholm.

== Culture and recreation ==
Sandviken is home to a number of cultural activities: Kulturskolan means "the culture school" (extramural music, dance and drama training), Sandviken Big Band, Sandviken Symphonic Orchestra and many musicians in the region. Sandvikens Art Gallery shows throughout the year various exhibitions. Amongst the many tourist attractions in the municipality are the restored industrial villages in Gysinge and Högbo Bruk, which include forges and smithies, handicraft, manor houses and outdoor recreation facilities, and the downhill skiing facilities and Snowpark at Kungsberget.

Sweden's first Mandaean place of worship, or mandi, was consecrated in Sandviken in 2003.

Sandviken hosted the 2023 Women World Curling Championship, being the first Swedish city to host it since Gävle in 2004.

== History ==
Sandviken was founded in 1862 in connection with the construction of the Sandvik AB ironworks. In 1900, Sandviken was one of Sweden's three largest ironworks, and had around 2,000 employees.

GreenIron established a metal-recycling and production facility in Sandviken that uses hydrogen to reduce metal oxides from iron ore and steel-industry residues. The company reported that the facility entered commercial production in January 2026. In February 2026, GreenIron and Norwegian Hydrogen announced an expanded strategic cooperation involving the supply and production of green hydrogen for metal-reduction facilities.

== Sports ==
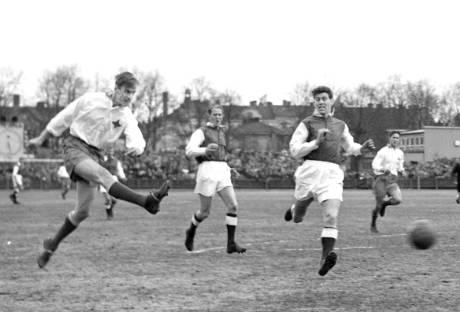
Jernvallen was a venue for the 1958 FIFA World Cup

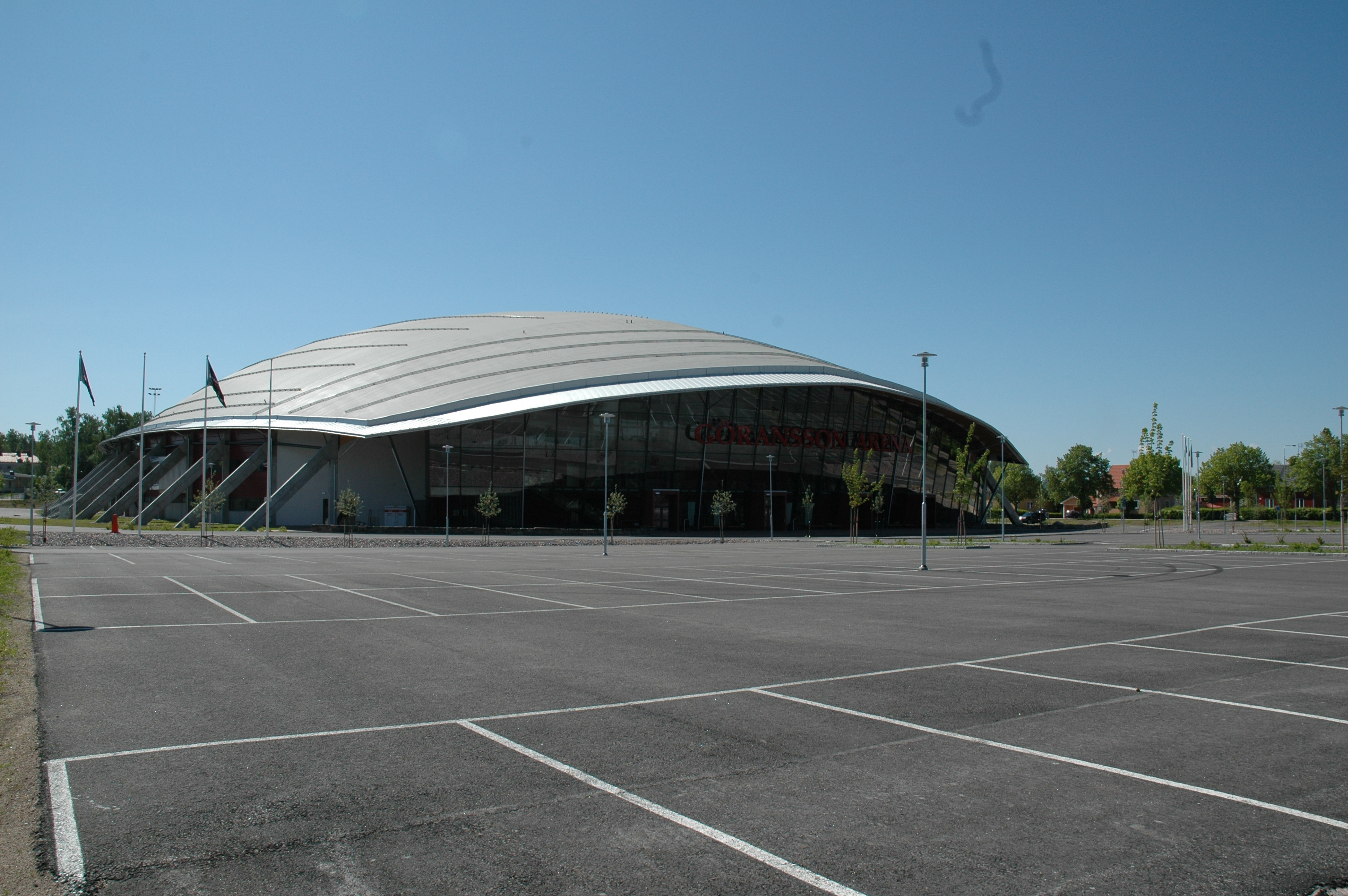
Göransson Arena

Sandvikens AIK have become Swedish bandy champions several times. From the season 2009-10, they play indoors in Göransson Arena. This arena was the Division A venue for the 2017 Bandy World Championship. Sandviken also hosts the World Cup, in which the home team in 2017 won for the first time on home ice (and the first time at all ever since 2002).

Football clubs located in Sandviken are Sandvikens IF who play in Division 1 Norra and Sandvikens AIK FK who play in Division 3 Södra Norrland. Their Jernvallen stadium was a venue of the 1958 FIFA World Cup, making Sandviken the northernmost city to host the tournament.

Sandviken is the birthplace of footballer Kim Källström and alpine ski racer Sara Hector.

== Transportation ==
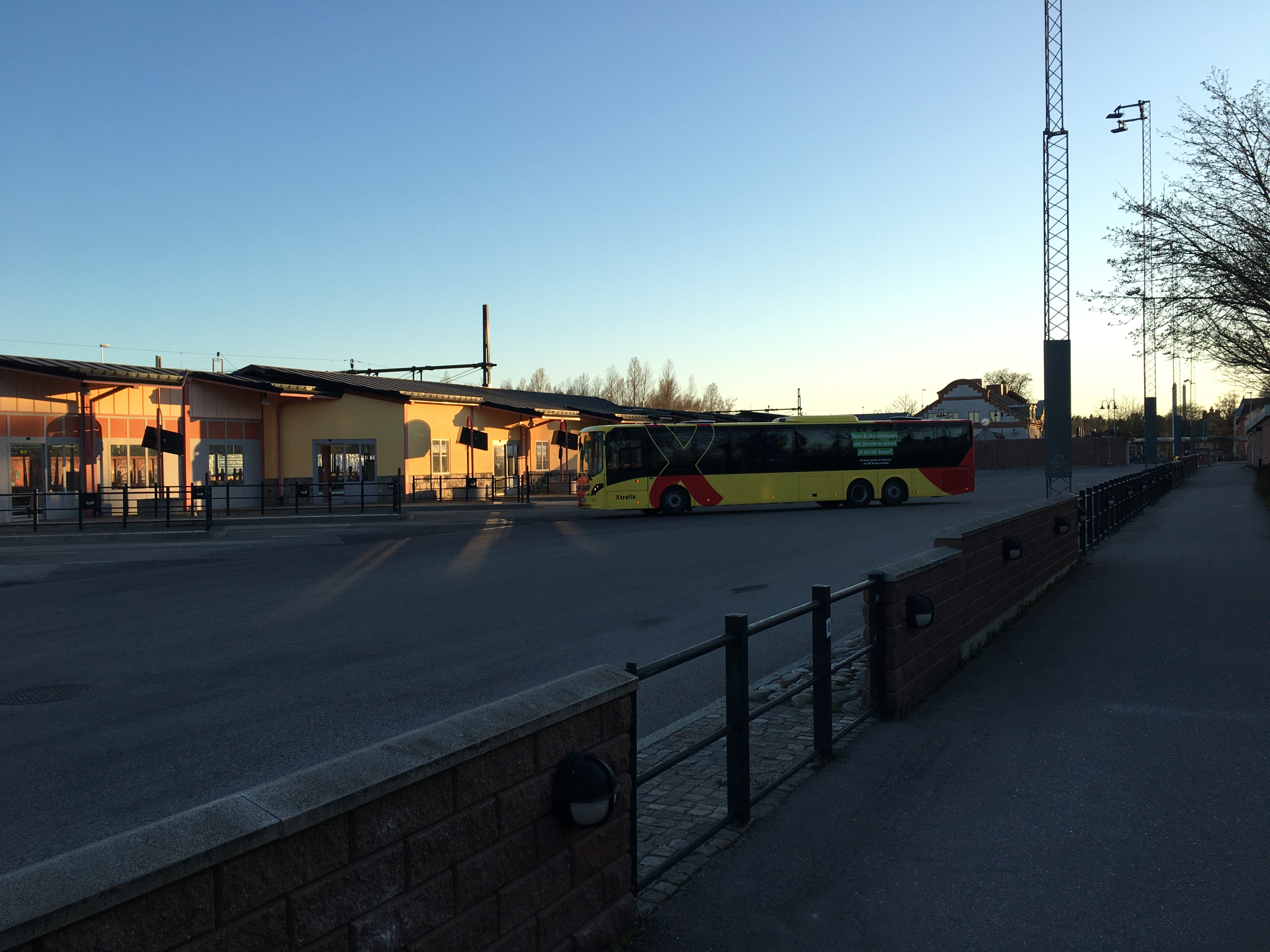
Sandviken resecentrum as seen from the east.

There are multiple buses running in Sandviken, the main ones being the 11 (Säljan), 13 (Vallhov-Norrsätra) and 14 (Björksätra). The buses, with the exception of 11, run on a half-hourly traffic schedule on the weekdays, and on an hourly traffic schedule during holidays and weekends. Bus 11 always runs on an hourly traffic schedule.

Sandviken used to be connected to Gävle via Route 80 (riksväg 80), but has since been replaced with the European route E16. Route 68 (riksväg 68) connects Sandviken with the city of Örebro and Gävle, and Route 272 (länsväg 272), colloquially known as "Högbovägen", connects Sandviken to the smaller village of Högbo. The city extends to the south along Route 272 until it meets Storsjön, where the road creates a causeway across the lake. Sandviken airport, although closer to the town of Valbo, serves the air travel needs for Sandviken, as well nearby Gävle.
