= Johan Löfstedt =

Swedish bandy player

Personal information
- Date of birth: 10 November 1986 (age 38)
- Playing position: Midfielder; Forward

Club information
- Current team: Vetlanda
- Number: 23

Youth career
- Vetlanda

Senior career*
| Years | Team | Apps^{†} | (Gls)^{†} |
| 2001–2011 | Vetlanda | | |
| 2011–2013 | Sandviken | | |
| 2013– | Vetlanda | | |

National team
- Sweden
Medal record
Men's bandy
Representing Sweden
World Championships
| Gold medal – first place | 2012 Almaty | Team |
| Gold medal – first place | 2017 Sandviken | Team |
| Silver medal – second place | 2013 Sweden/Norway | Team |
| Silver medal – second place | 2014 Irkutsk | Team |
| Silver medal – second place | 2018 Khabarovsk | Team |
- * Senior club appearances and goals counted for the domestic league only. † Appearances (Goals).

Johan Löfstedt (born 10 November 1986) is a Swedish professional bandy player.

== Career ==
=== Club career ===
Löfstedt is a youth product of Vetlanda and has represented their senior team and Sandviken.

=== International career ===
Löfstedt was part of Swedish World Champions teams of 2012 and 2017.

== Honours ==
=== Country ===
Sweden

- Bandy World Championship: 2012, 2017
