= Borlänge-Stora Tuna BK =

- City: Borlänge, Sweden
- League: Allsvenskan
- Founded: 1981; 44 years ago
- Home arena: Tunets IP

Former club logo 2016–2019.

Borlänge-Stora Tuna BK, commonly known as Borlänge Bandy, is a bandy club in Borlänge in Sweden. It was founded in 1981, when two clubs combined and played under that name until 2016, when it changed to Peace & Love City because of a cooperation with the Peace & Love cultural festival. The full legal name is still Ideella föreningen Borlänge-Stora Tuna Bandyklubb med firma Borlänge-Stora Tuna BK. Since 2019, the club is again called Borlänge-Stora Tuna BK.

The club has been playing in the second level league of Swedish bandy, Allsvenskan, in the 2010–11 season and again since the 2012–13 season.

Borlänge Bandy has a cooperation agreement with the Somalia national bandy team. The latter team was created by Somali expats living in Borlänge and the well-known Borlänge Bandy coach Per Fosshaug is their head coach.

In April 2024, the club withdrew their first team from national level bandy.

== See also ==
- Category:Borlänge-Stora Tuna BK players
