= IFK Vänersborg =

- City: Vänersborg, Sweden
- League: Elitserien
- Founded: 9 March 1903; 122 years ago
- Home arena: Arena Vänersborg
- Head coach: Ari Holopainen
- Website: ifkvanersborg.se
Home colours	Away colours

IFK Vänersborg is a Swedish sports club in Vänersborg, Sweden, most famous for its success in bandy.

== History ==
The club was formed on 9 March 1903. The first years saw the club also compete in sports such as gymnastics and athletics.

In bandy, the club played in Allsvenskan for the first time during the 1975–76 season. The club was degraded and did not return until the 1982–83 season. The club was once again degraded, and was not upgraded until the 1986–87 season. Since then, the club has stayed in the top league, now called Elitserien.

During the 2014 World Cup the team played the final, losing 1–4 against Västerås SK.

The club has one of the more modern indoor arenas for bandy, the Arena Vänersborg, inaugurated in 2009. The former home field of the club, the outdoor bandy rink Vänersborgs isstadion, is still in use for other bandy teams in Vänersborg.
