= Sandviken Municipality =

Sandviken Municipality Sandvikens kommun
- Municipality
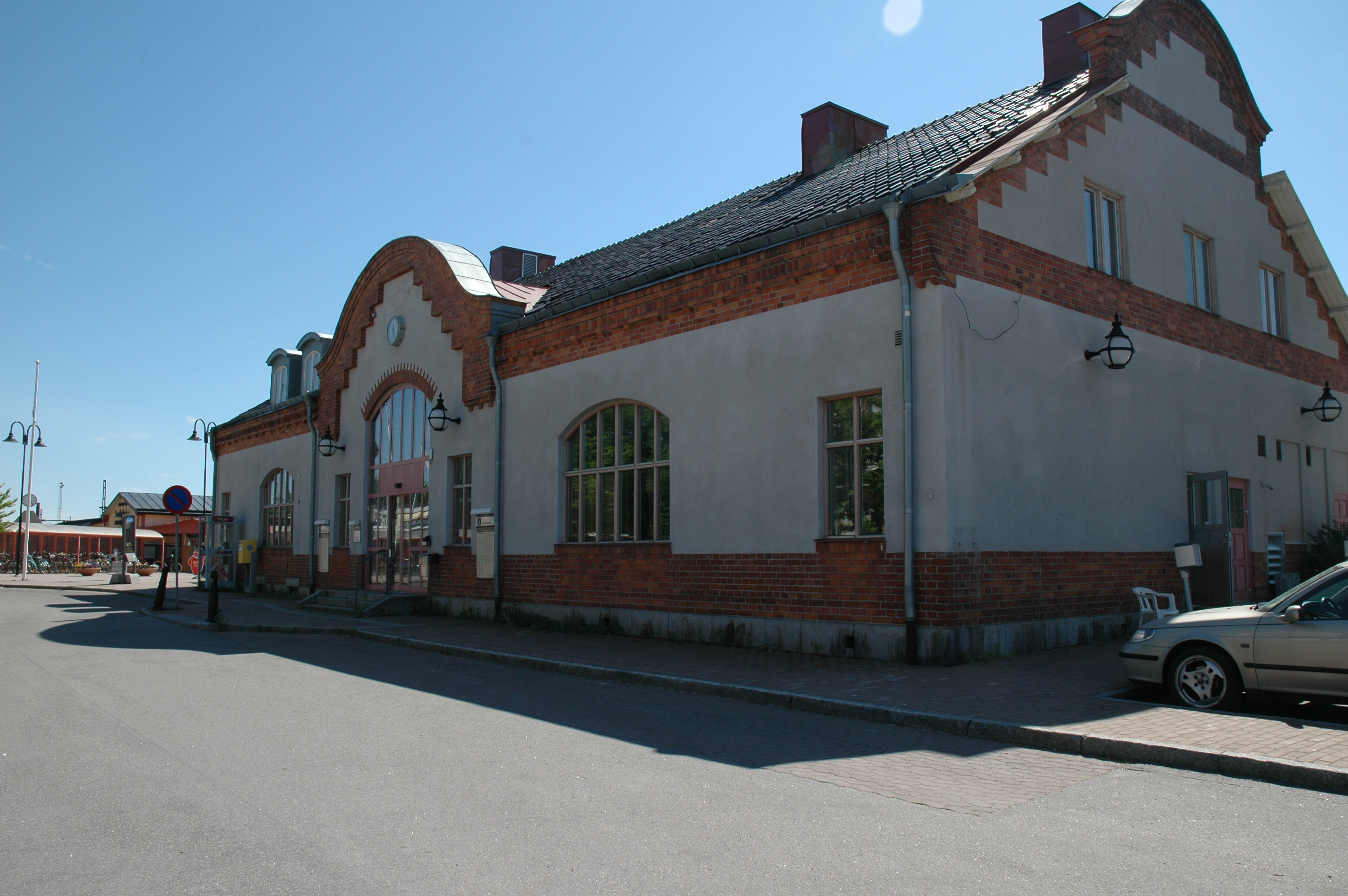
- Sandviken Railway Station

- Coat of arms

- Coordinates: 60°37′N 16°47′E
- Country: Sweden
- County: Gävleborg County
- Seat: Sandviken

Area
  - Total: 1,297.07 km^{2} (500.80 sq mi)
  - Land: 1,166.4 km^{2} (450.3 sq mi)
  - Water: 130.67 km^{2} (50.45 sq mi)
- Area as of 1 January 2014.

Population (30 June 2025)
  - Total: 38,340
  - Density: 32.87/km^{2} (85.13/sq mi)
- Time zone: UTC+1 (CET)
  - Summer (DST): UTC+2 (CEST)
- ISO 3166 code: SE
- Province: Gästrikland
- Municipal code: 2181
- Website: sandviken.se

Sandviken Municipality (Swedish: Sandvikens kommun) is a municipality in Gävleborg County, in east central Sweden. The seat is the town of Sandviken.

The present municipality was created in 1971 through the amalgamation of the City of Sandviken (itself instituted in 1943) with a number of surrounding rural municipalities.

== Coat of arms ==
The coat of arms was granted to the then City of Sandviken upon its institution in 1943. The device in the middle is a steam hammer. After the municipality reform of 1971 the arms was taken over by the new, larger, entity.

== Name ==
Sandviken means "sandy bay". There are numerous other places by that name throughout Scandinavia.

== Demographics ==
This is a demographic table based on Sandviken Municipality's electoral districts in the 2022 Swedish general election sourced from SVT's election platform, in turn taken from SCB official statistics.

In total there were 29,612 Swedish citizens of voting age resident in the municipality. 50.2% voted for the left coalition and 48.6% for the right coalition. Indicators are in percentage points except population totals and income.

Location	Residents	Citizen adults	Left vote	Right vote	Employed	Swedish parents	Foreign heritage	Income SEK	Degree
Location			%	%					
Barrsätra	1,865	1,445	54.3	44.9	78	76	24	25,756	41
Björksätra	2,633	1,423	62.7	35.2	56	42	58	14,756	21
Gästrike-Hammarby	2,049	1,647	44.4	55.0	75	91	9	21,597	23
Jernvallen N	1,925	1,586	54.2	44.8	86	86	14	27,653	39
Jernvallen S	2,337	1,811	48.5	50.6	84	85	15	29,618	41
Jäderfors-Norrsätra	1,999	1,206	53.3	45.6	68	51	49	19,538	26
Järbo	2,600	2,043	41.9	56.7	83	91	9	25,689	28
Kungsgården-Åshammar	2,528	1,944	39.6	58.9	82	89	11	25,224	23
Murgården	2,542	1,404	66.6	31.6	55	36	64	14,309	19
Sandbacka	2,372	1,866	49.2	49.8	82	82	18	27,126	36
Sandviken C	2,069	1,835	54.5	44.0	72	72	28	22,038	30
Sandviken N	2,529	2,000	50.1	49.1	88	91	9	29,927	45
Stadsparken	1,879	1,655	62.3	36.6	74	78	22	19,961	31
Storvik N	1,672	1,321	48.0	50.7	83	90	10	26,163	32
Säljan	2,229	1,736	46.2	53.0	88	90	10	31,033	42
Vallhov	2,498	1,769	52.9	46.3	80	72	28	25,685	36
Årsunda	2,250	1,872	42.7	56.7	88	94	6	27,414	30
Österfärnebo	1,234	1,049	46.6	51.6	80	92	8	22,467	25
Source: SVT

== Sports ==
Sandviken Municipality was one of the co-arrangers of the 2017 Bandy World Championship, which was held in Göransson Arena, a municipality owned bandy arena in Sandviken.

== See also ==
- Sandvik - engineering company founded in Sandviken
