= List of years in ice sports =

This page indexes the individual year in ice sports pages. Most years are annotated with one or more significant event as a reference point.

== Pre-19th Century ==
- Skating has been shown to have been in use since 3,000 years back.
- 1541, first written record about curling
- 18th Century, sports resembling bandy and ice hockey were played in the winter time in England, the Netherlands, Russia and North America.

== 1870s ==
- c. 1870

First track for bobsleigh in Switzerland

- 1875

The first formal games of bandy and ice hockey are played in London, England and Montreal, British North America (Canada) respectively.

== 1880s ==
- 1884

The first formal competitions in bobsleigh takes place in St. Moritz.

== 1890s ==
- 1891

The first international bandy match is played, between an English and a Dutch team.

- 1892

International Skating Union is founded.
The first written published rules of bandy. National Bandy Association is founded in England.

- 1893

Stanley Cup is awarded for the first time.

== 1900s ==
- 1907

The first Swedish national championship in bandy is played.

- 1908

Figure skating at the 1908 Summer Olympics is the first ice sport included in the Olympic Games.
Ligue Internationale de Hockey sur Glace was founded.
The first Finnish national championship in bandy is played.

== 1910s ==
- 1910

The first ever European ice hockey championship is won by Great Britain.

- 1913

The first ever European bandy championship is won by England.

== 1920s ==
- 1923

Ice hockey is included in the 1920 Summer Olympics.
International Bobsleigh and Skeleton Federation (FIBT) is founded

- 1924

The first ever Winter Olympics includes the ice sports bobsleigh, figure skating, and ice hockey. Curling was played unofficially.

== 1950s ==
- 1952

The Canadian Broadcasting Corporation (CBC) began televising games in the National Hockey League.

- 1954

The 1954 World Championships has been described by the IIHF as "the start of the modern era of international hockey." The tournament saw the first participation of the Soviet Union in international competition.

- 1955

The first World Luge Championships is arranged.
The Federation of International Bandy is founded.

- 1957

1957 Bandy World Championship is the first ever bandy world championship.

- 1959

The first ever World Curling Championships is played.

== 1960s ==
- 1967

1967 NHL expansion doubles the number of ice hockey teams in NHL from the Original Six to twelve.

== 1970s ==
- 1972

World Hockey Association starts its league as a competitor to NHL.

- 1979

World Hockey Association ceases its operations, the teams being added to the NHL.

== 1990s ==
- 1998

Curling at the Winter Olympics officially for the first time.

== 2000s ==
- 2000
- 2001
- 2002
- 2003
- 2004

2004 Women's Bandy World Championship is the first ever bandy world championship for women's teams.

- 2005
- 2006
- 2007
- 2008
- 2009

== 2010s ==
- 2010
- 2011
- 2012
- 2013
- 2014
- 2015
- 2016
- 2017
- 2018
- 2019

== 2020s ==
- 2020
- 2021
- 2022
- 2023
- 2024
- 2025
