= Rekord Stadium =

Sports venue in Irkutsk, Russia

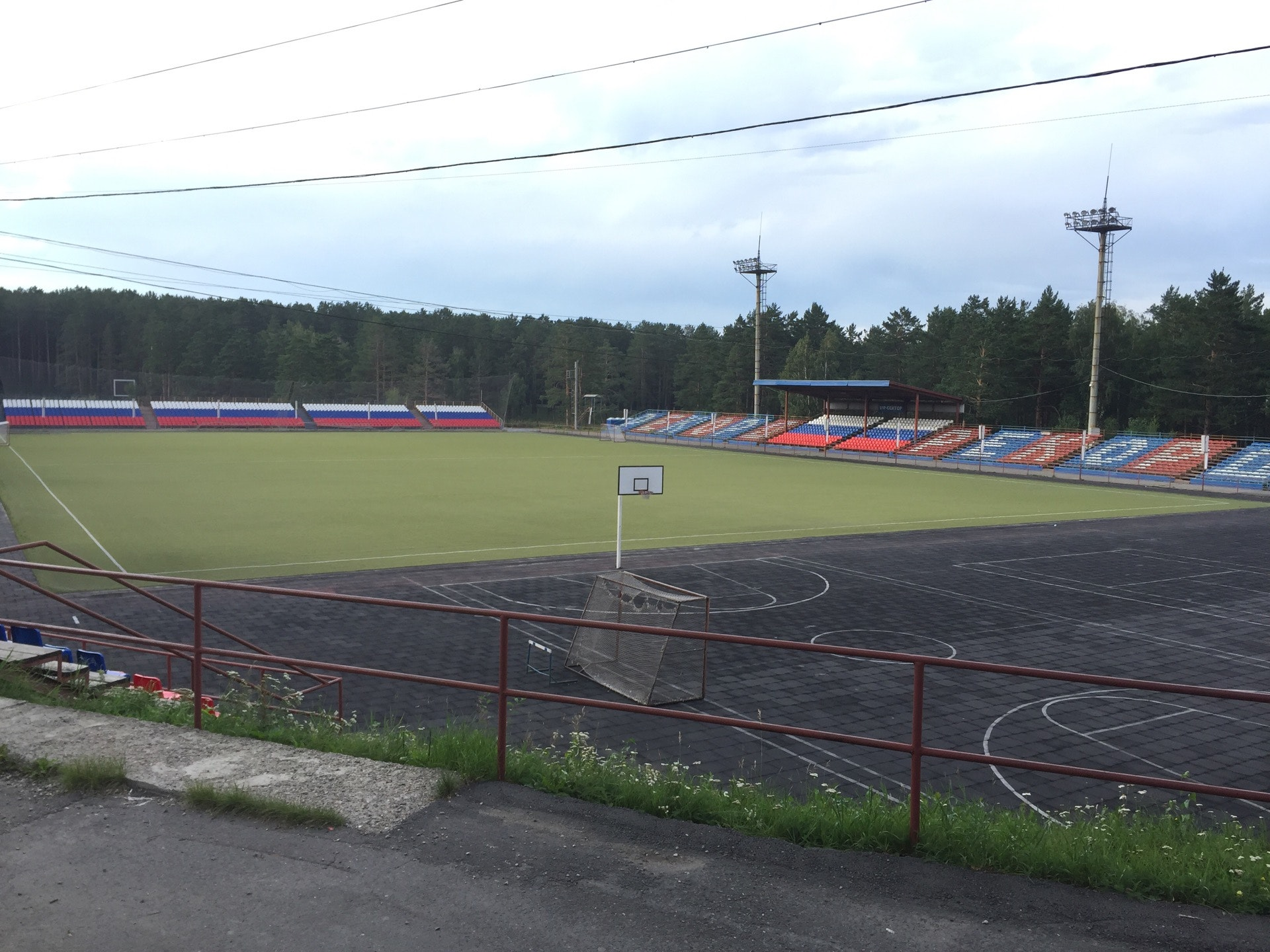
- Interactive map of Rekord Stadium
- Location: Irkutsk, Russia
- Capacity: 5,300

Tenants
- Baykal-Energiya 2 Rekord Irkutsk

Rekord Stadium is a multi-purpose stadium in Irkutsk. It is mainly used as the home of bandy clubs Baykal-Energiya 2 and Rekord Irkutsk.
