= List of Russian women bandy champions =

This list of Russian women bandy champions shows the Russian national bandy champions for women's teams.

There was a Russian championship in the Russian Soviet Federative Socialist Republic in 1952-1954, but this was then discontinued. A team representing Moscow Oblast won it all these three years. In 1987, an RSFSR championship was arranged again and has been held annually since then. In the 1990/91 and 1991/92 seasons, the Russian championship was replaced by one for the entire Soviet Union, but since this union was dissolved midway through the latter season, the championship has then been for the Russian Federation since the 1992/93 season.

Year	RSFSR Champions
1987	Start Krasnogorsk
1988	Stankoagregat Moscow
1989	Serp i Molot Moscow
1990	Serp i Molot Moscow
Year	Soviet Champions
1991	Serp i Molot Moscow
1992	Serp i Molot Moscow
Year	Russian Champions
1993	October Moscow
1994	October Moscow
1995	Burevestnik Arhkangelsk
1996	Burevestnik Arhkangelsk
1997	Rekord Irkutsk
1998	Rekord Irkutsk
1999	Burevestnik Arhkangelsk
2000	Rekord Irkutsk
2001	Rekord Irkutsk
2002	Rekord Irkutsk
2003	Rekord Irkutsk
2004	Rekord Irkutsk
2005	Rekord Irkutsk
2006	Rekord Irkutsk
2007	Rekord Irkutsk
2008	Rekord Irkutsk
2009	Rekord Irkutsk
2010	Rekord Irkutsk
2011	Rekord Irkutsk
2012	Zorky Krasnogorsk
2013	Rekord Irkutsk
2014	SKA Sverdlovsk
2015	Zorky Krasnogorsk
2016	Rekord Irkutsk
2017	Rekord Irkutsk
