= 2016 in ice sports =

== Bandy ==
=== World Championship ===
- January 31 – February 14: 2016 Bandy World Championship in Ulyanovsk Oblast
  - Division A: Russia defeated Finland, 6–1, to win their fourth consecutive and tenth overall Bandy World Championship title. Sweden took the bronze medal.
  - Division B: Germany defeated Hungary, 5–4, in the final, and is qualified for Division A next year. Ukraine took third place.

=== Women's World Championship ===
- February 18–21, 2016: 2016 Women's Bandy World Championship in (United States) Roseville, Minnesota
  - Sweden defeated Russia, 1–0, to win their seventh women's title. Norway took the bronze medal.

=== World Cup ===
- Final game, November 16, 2015: HK Yenisey (Russia) - Sandvikens AIK (Sweden), 5–0

=== National champions ===
- Finland: Botnia-69 (men), Sudet (women)
- Norway: Stabæk IF (men), Stabæk IF (women)
- Russia: HK Yenisey (men), Rekord Irkutsk (women)
- Sweden: Västerås SK (men), Kareby IS (women)
- Ukraine: Dynamo Kharkiv (men)
- United States: Bandolier BC (men)

=== International Youth Championships ===
- January 2016: U23 World Championship
  - Winner: Sweden

== Bobsleigh and skeleton ==
=== IBSF World championships and Winter Youth Olympics ===
- January 19–23: IBSF Junior World Championships 2016 in Winterberg
  - Two-man junior bobsleigh winners: Germany (Johannes Lochner, Joshua Bluhm)
  - Four-man junior bobsleigh winners: Germany (Johannes Lochner, Sebastian Mrowka, Joshua Bluhm, Matthias Sommer)
  - Two-woman junior bobsleigh winners: Germany (Stephanie Schneider, Lisa Marie Buckwitz)
  - Men's skeleton winner: (Russia) Nikita Tregubov
  - Women's skeleton winner: (Latvia) Lelde Priedulēna
- February 8–21: FIBT World Championships 2016 in (Austria) Innsbruck–Igls
  - Two-man bobsleigh winners: Germany (Francesco Friedrich, Thorsten Margis)
  - Four-man bobsleigh winners: Latvia (Oskars Melbārdis, Daumants Dreiškens, Arvis Vilkaste, Jānis Strenga)
  - Two-woman bobsleigh winners: Germany (Anja Schneiderheinze-Stöckel, Annika Drazek)
  - Men's skeleton winner: (Latvia) Martins Dukurs
  - Women's skeleton winner: (Germany) Tina Hermann
  - Team winners: Germany (Axel Jungk, Anja Schneiderheinze-Stöckel, Franziska Bertels, Tina Hermann, Johannes Lochner, Tino Paasche)
- February 19: Skeleton at the 2016 Winter Youth Olympics in (Norway) Lillehammer
  - Boys' winners: (gold) (Russia) Evgenii Rukosuev; (silver) (Norway) Alexander Hestengen; (bronze) (Germany) Robin Schneider
  - Girls' winners: (gold) (United Kingdom) Ashleigh Fay Pittaway; (silver) (Germany) Hannah Neise; (bronze) (France) Agathe Bessard
- February 20: Bobsleigh at the 2016 Winter Youth Olympics in (Norway) Lillehammer
  - Boys' monobob winners: (gold) (Germany) Jonas Jannusch; (silver) (Russia) Maksim Ivanov; (bronze) (Norway) Kristian Olsen
  - Girls' monobob winners: (gold) (Germany) Laura Nolte; (silver) (Austria) Mercedes Schulte; (bronze) (United Kingdom) Kelsea Purchall

=== 2015–16 Bobsleigh and Skeleton World Cups ===
- November 22–29, 2015: IBSF World Cup #1 in Altenberg, Saxony
  - Two-man bobsleigh winners: Germany (Francesco Friedrich, Thorsten Margis)
  - Four-man bobsleigh winners: Germany (Francesco Friedrich, Martin Putze, Jannis Bäcker, Thorsten Margis)
  - Two-woman bobsleigh winners: Canada (Kaillie Humphries, Melissa Lotholz)
  - Men's skeleton winner: (Latvia) Martins Dukurs
  - Women's skeleton winner: (United Kingdom) Laura Deas
- November 30 – December 6, 2015: IBSF World Cup #2 in Winterberg
  - Two-man bobsleigh winners: Germany (Francesco Friedrich, Thorsten Margis)
  - Four-man bobsleigh winners: Germany (Francesco Friedrich, Martin Putze, Jannis Bäcker, Thorsten Margis)
  - Two-woman bobsleigh winners: United States (Jamie Greubel, Cherrelle Garrett)
  - Men's skeleton winner: (Latvia) Martins Dukurs
  - Women's skeleton winner: (Germany) Tina Hermann
- December 7–13, 2015: IBSF World Cup #3 in Schönau am Königsee #1
  - Two-man bobsleigh winners: Germany (Francesco Friedrich, Thorsten Margis)
  - Four-man bobsleigh winners: Germany (Nico Walther, Gregor Bermbach, Marko Hübenbecker, Eric Franke)
  - Two-woman bobsleigh winners: Canada (Kaillie Humphries, Melissa Lotholz)
  - Men's skeleton winner: (Latvia) Martins Dukurs
  - Women's skeleton winner: (Germany) Tina Hermann
- January 3–9: IBSF World Cup #4 in Lake Placid, New York
  - Two-man bobsleigh winners: United States (Steven Holcomb, Carlo Valdes)
  - Four-man bobsleigh winners: Germany (Maximilian Arndt, Martin Putze, Ben Heber, Kevin Korona)
  - Two-woman bobsleigh winners: United States (Jamie Greubel, Cherrelle Garrett)
  - Men's skeleton winner: (Latvia) Martins Dukurs
  - Women's skeleton winner: (United States) Annie O'Shea
- January 10–16: IBSF World Cup #5 in (United States) Park City, Utah
  - Note: no two-man bobsleigh event here.
  - Four-man bobsleigh #1 winners: Russia (Alexander Kasjanov, Ilvir Huzin, Aleksei Pushkarev, Aleksey Zaytsev)
  - Four-man bobsleigh #2 winners: Germany (Nico Walther, Marko Hübenbecker, Christian Poser, Eric Franke)
  - Two-woman bobsleigh winners: Canada (Kaillie Humphries, Melissa Lotholz)
  - Men's skeleton winner: (Latvia) Martins Dukurs
  - Women's skeleton winner: (Germany) Tina Hermann
- January 18–23: IBSF World Cup #6 in Whistler, British Columbia
  - Note: no four-man bobsleigh event here.
  - Two-man bobsleigh #1 winners: Switzerland (Rico Peter, Thomas Amrhein)
  - Two-man bobsleigh #2 winners: Canada (Christopher Spring, Lascelles Brown)
  - Two-woman bobsleigh winners: Canada (Kaillie Humphries, Melissa Lotholz)
  - Men's skeleton winner: (Latvia) Martins Dukurs
  - Women's skeleton winner: (Germany) Tina Hermann
- February 1–7: IBSF World Cup #7 in St. Moritz
  - Two-man bobsleigh winners: Switzerland (Beat Hefti, Alex Baumann)
  - Four-man bobsleigh winners: Germany (Maximilian Arndt, Kevin Korona, Martin Putze, Ben Heber)
  - Two-woman bobsleigh winners: United States (Elana Meyers, Lauren Gibbs)
  - Men's skeleton winner: (South Korea) Yun Sung-bin
  - Women's skeleton winner: (Austria) Janine Flock
- February 22–28: IBSF World Cup #8 (final) in Schönau am Königsee #2
  - Two-man bobsleigh winners: South Korea (Won Yun-jong, Seo Young-woo)
  - Four-man bobsleigh winners: Germany (Maximilian Arndt, Alexander Rödiger, Kevin Kuske, Martin Putze)
  - Two-woman bobsleigh winners: United States (Elana Meyers, Kehri Jones)
  - Men's skeleton winner: (Latvia) Martins Dukurs
  - Women's skeleton winner: (Germany) Tina Hermann

=== Bobsleigh IBSF North American Cup 2015–2016 ===
- November 9–14, 2015: IBSF North American Cup #1 in Calgary
  - Men's two-man #1 winners: United States (Codie Bascue / Evan Weinstock)
  - Men's two-man #2 winners: Canada (Christopher Spring / Derek Plug)
  - Men's four-man #1 winners: Canada (Justin Kripps, Alexander Kopacz, Joshua Kirkpatrick, Ben Coakwell)
  - Men's four-man #2 winners: United States (Codie Bascue, David Cremin, Nathan Gilsleider, Evan Weinstock)
  - Men's four-man #3 winners: France (Loïc Costerg, Romain Heinrich, Yannis Puyar, Jordan Bytebier) and Monaco (Rudy Rinaldi, Boris Vain, Thibault Demarthon, Albéric Delattre)
  - Women's two-man #1 winners: Canada (Christine de Bruin / Cynthia Appiah)
  - Women's two-man #2 winners: Canada (Christine de Bruin / Cynthia Appiah)
- November 27–29, 2015: IBSF North American Cup #2 in Whistler
  - Open two-man #1 winners: Canada (Nick Poloniato, Cameron Stones)
  - Open two-man #2 winners: Canada (Nick Poloniato, Joey Nemet)
  - Women's two-man #1 winners: Canada (Christine de Bruin / Cynthia Appiah)
  - Women's two-man #2 winners: United States (Brittany Reinbolt, Bonnie Kilis)
- February 26–29, 2016: IBSF North American Cup #3 in Park City
  - Men's two-man #1 winners: (United States) (Codie Bascue / Nathan Gilsleider)
  - Men's two-man #2 winners: (United States) (Codie Bascue / Nathan Gilsleider)
  - Women's bobsleigh #1 winner: (United States) Nicole Vogt
  - Women's bobsleigh #2 winner: (United States) Katie Eberling
  - Men's four-man #1 winners: United States (Justin Olsen, Brent Fogt, Luis Moreira, Evan Weinstock)
  - Men's four-man #2 winners: United States (Codie Bascue, David Cremin, Nathan Gilsleider, Adrian Adams)

=== Bobsleigh IBSF Europe Cup 2015–2016 ===
- November 27–29, 2015: IBSF Europe Cup #1 in Winterberg
  - Open two-man #1 winners: Germany (Johannes Lochner, Gregor Bermbach)
  - Open two-man #2 winners: Germany (Johannes Lochner, Joshua Bluhm)
  - Women's two-man #1 winners: Germany (Sabrina Duljevic, Lisa-Sophie Gericke)
  - Women's two-man #2 winners: Russia (Alexandra Rodionova, Yulia Shokshueva)
  - Open four-man #1 winners: Germany (Johannes Lochner, Gregor Bermbach, Tino Paasche, Christian Rasp)
  - Open four-man #2 winners: Germany (Johannes Lochner, Gregor Bermbach, Joshua Bluhm, Christian Rasp)
- December 4–5, 2015: IBSF Europe Cup #2 in Altenberg
  - Men's two-man winners: Germany (Johannes Lochner, Sebastian Mrowka)
  - Women's two-man winners: Russia (Alexandra Rodionova, Yulia Shokshueva)
  - Open four-man winners: Germany (Johannes Lochner, Gregor Bermbach, Sebastian Mrowka, Christian Rasp)
- December 19–20, 2015: IBSF Europe Cup #3 in Sigulda
  - Men's two-man #1 winners: Latvia (Uģis Žaļims, Intars Dambis)
  - Men's two-man #2 winners: Latvia (Oskars Melbārdis, Jānis Strenga)
  - Women's two-man #1 winners: Russia (Alexandra Rodionova, Yulia Shokshueva)
  - Women's two-man #2 winners: Russia (Alexandra Rodionova, Yulia Shokshueva)
- January 8–10, 2016: IBSF Europe Cup #4 in Schönau am Königssee
  - Men's two-man #1 winners: Germany (Johannes Lochner, Matthias Kagerhuber)
  - Women's two-man #1 winners: Germany (Stephanie Schneider, Lisa Marie Buckwitz)
  - Open four-man winner: Germany (Johannes Lochner, Sebastian Mrowka, Joshua Bluhm, Matthias Sommer)
  - Open four-man winner: Germany (Johannes Lochner, Sebastian Mrowka, Joshua Bluhm, Matthias Sommer)
- January 14–17, 2016: IBSF Europe Cup #5 in (Austria) Innsbruck–Igls
  - Men's two-man winners: Germany (Johannes Lochner, Joshua Bluhm)
  - Women's two-man winners: United States (Elana Meyers, Kehri Jones)
  - Open four-man winner: Germany (Johannes Lochner, Matthias Kagerhuber, Sebastian Mrowka, Joshua Bluhm)
  - Open four-man winner: Germany (Johannes Lochner, Matthias Sommer, Sebastian Mrowka, Joshua Bluhm)
- January 27–30, 2016: IBSF Europe Cup #6 (final) in St. Moritz
  - Men's two-man winners: Switzerland (Beat Hefti, Alex Baumann)
  - Women's two-man winners: United States (Elana Meyers, Tara Evans)
  - Open four-man winners: Austria (Benjamin Maier, Markus Sammer, Stefan Laussegger, Dănuț Moldovan)

=== Skeleton IBSF North American Cup 2015–2016 ===
- November 12–13, 2015: IBSF North American Cup in (Canada) Calgary
  - Men's skeleton #1 winner: (Spain) Ander Mirambell
  - Men's skeleton #2 winner: (Spain) Ander Mirambell
  - Women's skeleton #1 winner: (Canada) Jaclyn LaBerge
  - Women's skeleton #2 winner: (Canada) Jaclyn LaBerge
- November 26–27, 2015: IBSF North American Cup #2 in (Canada) Whistler
  - Men's skeleton #1 winner: (New Zealand) Rhys Thornbury
  - Men's skeleton #1 winner: (New Zealand) Rhys Thornbury
  - Women's skeleton #1 winner: (United States) Savannah Graybill
  - Women's skeleton #2 winner: (United States) Katie Uhlaender
- March 4–5, 2016: IBSF North American Cup #3 in (United States) Park City
  - Men's skeleton #1 winner: (Spain) Ander Mirambell
  - Men's skeleton #1 winner: (Australia) John Farrow
  - Women's skeleton #1 winner: (Netherlands) Kimberley Bos
  - Women's skeleton #2 winner: (Netherlands) Kimberley Bos

=== Skeleton IBSF Intercontinental Cup 2015–2016 ===
- November 19–20, 2015: IBSF Intercontinental Cup #1 in (United States) Lake Placid
  - Men's skeleton #1 winner: (Germany) Alexander Gassner
  - Men's skeleton #2 winner: (Germany) Martin Rosenberger
  - Women's skeleton #1 winner: (United States) Katie Uhlaender
  - Women's skeleton #2 winner: (United States) Katie Uhlaender
- December 2–3, 2015: IBSF Intercontinental Cup #2 in (Canada) Whistler
  - Men's skeleton #1 winner: (Germany) Martin Rosenberger
  - Men's skeleton #2 winner: (New Zealand) Rhys Thornbury
  - Women's skeleton #1 winner: (Canada) Lanette Prediger
  - Women's skeleton #2 winner: (United States) Katie Uhlaender
- January 7–8, 2016: IBSF Intercontinental Cup #3 in (Austria) Innsbruck–Igls
  - Men's skeleton #1 winner: (Russia) Aleksandr Tretyakov
  - Men's skeleton #2 winner: (Russia) Nikita Tregubov
  - Women's skeleton #1 winner: (Russia) Elena Nikitina
  - Women's skeleton #2 winner: (Russia) Elena Nikitina
- January 14–15, 2016: IBSF Intercontinental Cup #4 (final) in (Germany) Schönau am Königssee
  - Men's skeleton #1 winner: (Russia) Nikita Tregubov
  - Men's skeleton #2 winner: (Russia) Aleksandr Tretyakov
  - Women's skeleton #1 winner: (Germany) Anna Fernstaedt
  - Women's skeleton #2 winner: (Germany) Anna Fernstaedt

=== Skeleton IBSF Europa Cup 2015–2016 ===
- December 4–5, 2015: IBSF Europa Cup #1 in (Germany) Altenberg
  - Men's skeleton #1 winner: (Russia) Sergey Chudinov
  - Men's skeleton #2 winners: (Germany) Fabian Küchler / (Russia) Alexander Mutovin
  - Women's skeleton #1 winner: (Russia) Olga Potylitsina
  - Women's skeleton #2 winner: (Germany) Maxi Just
- December 19–20, 2015: IBSF Europe Cup #2 in (Latvia) Sigulda
  - Men's skeleton #1 winner: (Russia) Alexander Mutovin
  - Men's skeleton #2 winner: (Latvia) Ivo Steinbergs
  - Women's skeleton #1 winner: (Canada) Mirela Rahneva
  - Women's skeleton #2 winner: (Canada) Mirela Rahneva
- January 14–15, 2016: IBSF Europe Cup #3 in (Germany) Schönau am Königssee
  - Women's skeleton #1 winner: (Germany) Maxi Just
  - Women's skeleton #2 winner: (Germany) Maxi Just
  - Men's skeleton #1 winner: (Germany) Dominic Rady
  - Men's skeleton #2 winner: (Germany) Dominic Rady
- January 27–28, 2016: IBSF Europe Cup #4 (final) in (Germany) St. Moritz
  - Men's skeleton #1 winner: (United Kingdom) David Swift
  - Men's skeleton #2 winner: (Germany) Fabian Küchler
  - Women's skeleton #1 winner: (Canada) Mirela Rahneva
  - Women's skeleton #2 winner: (Canada) Mirela Rahneva

== Curling ==
=== World curling championships and Winter Youth Olympics ===
- September 12–19, 2015: 2015 World Mixed Curling Championship in (Switzerland) Bern (debut event)
  - Norway (skip: Steffen Walstad) defeated Sweden (skip: Rasmus Wranå), 5–3, to win the inaugural WCF's World Mixed Curling Championship title.
  - China (skip: Ji Yansong) took the bronze medal.
- February 12–21: 2016 Winter Youth Olympics in (Norway) Lillehammer
  - Mixed doubles winners:
    - (gold) (Japan) Yako Matsuzawa and (Switzerland) Philipp Hösli
    - (silver) (China) Han Yu and (United Kingdom) Ross Whyte
    - (bronze) (China) Zhao Ruiyi and (Norway) Andreas Hårstad
  - Mixed team winners: (gold) Canada; (silver) United States; (bronze) Switzerland
- February 21–28: 2016 World Wheelchair Curling Championship in (Switzerland) Lucerne
  - Russia (skip: Andrey Smirnov) defeated Norway (skip: Rune Lorentsen), 7–4, to win their second consecutive and third overall World Wheelchair Curling Championship title.
  - South Korea (skip: Yang Hui-tae) took the bronze medal.
- March 5–13: 2016 World Junior Curling Championships in (Denmark) Copenhagen
  - Note: this event was slated to Erzurum, but the WCF took it away due to terrorism fears.
  - Men: Scotland (skip: Bruce Mouat) defeated the United States (skip: Korey Dropkin), 6–4, to give Scotland its tenth World Junior Curling Championships title.
  - Canada (skip: Matt Dunstone) took the bronze medal.
  - Women: Canada (skip: Mary Fay) defeated the United States (skip: Cory Christensen), 7–4, to give Canada its third consecutive and 11th overall World Junior Curling Championships title.
  - South Korea (skip: Kim Min-ji) took the bronze medal.
- March 19–27: 2016 Ford World Women's Curling Championship in (Canada) Swift Current
  - Switzerland (skip: Binia Feltscher) defeated Japan (skip: Satsuki Fujisawa), 9–6, to win Switzerland's third consecutive and sixth overall World Women's Curling Championship title.
  - Russia (skip: Anna Sidorova) took the bronze medal.
- April 2–10: 2016 World Men's Curling Championship in (Switzerland) Basel
  - Note: this event is a PyeongChang 2018 Olympic qualifying one.
  - Canada (skip: Kevin Koe) defeated Denmark (skip: Rasmus Stjerne), 5–3, to win Canada's 35th World Men's Curling Championship title.
  - The United States (skip: John Shuster) took the bronze medal.
- April 16–23: 2016 World Senior and Mixed Doubles Curling Championships in Karlstad
  - Men's senior: Sweden (skip: Mats Wranå) defeated Canada (skip: Randy Neufeld), 7–4, to win Sweden's first World Senior Curling Championships title.
  - Ireland (skip: Peter Wilson) took the bronze medal.
  - Women's senior: Scotland (skip: Jackie Lockhart) defeated Germany (skip: Monika Wagner), 5–4, to win Scotland's third World Senior Curling Championships title.
  - Sweden (skip: Gunilla Arfwidsson-Edlund) took the bronze medal.
  - Mixed doubles: Russia (Alexander Krushelnitskiy and Anastasia Bryzgalova) defeated China (Ba Dexin and Wang Rui), 7–5, to win Russia's second World Mixed Doubles Curling Championship title.
  - The United States (Joe Polo and Tabitha Peterson) took the bronze medal.

=== Curling Canada season of champions ===
- December 2–6, 2015: 2015 Canada Cup of Curling in (Alberta) Grande Prairie
  - Men: (Alberta) Kevin Koe (skip) defeated (Manitoba) Mike McEwen (skip), 7–3, to win his first Canada Cup of Curling title.
  - Women: (Ontario) Rachel Homan (skip) defeated (Alberta) Valerie Sweeting (skip), 8–7, to win her first Canada Cup of Curling title.
- January 14–17: 2016 Continental Cup of Curling in (United States) Paradise, Nevada
  - Team (Canada) / (United States) North America defeated Team (United Nations) World, with the score of 30.5–29.5 total points.
- February 20–28: 2016 Scotties Tournament of Hearts in Grande Prairie
  - Chelsea Carey (skip) defeated (Northern Ontario) Krista McCarville (skip), 7–6, to win Alberta's second Scotties Tournament of Hearts title.
  - Team Canada (Jennifer Jones (skip)) took the bronze medal.
- March 5–13: 2016 Tim Hortons Brier in (Ontario) Ottawa
  - Kevin Koe (skip) defeated (Newfoundland and Labrador) Brad Gushue (skip), 9–5, to win Alberta's second Tim Hortons Brier title.
  - (Northern Ontario) Brad Jacobs (skip) took the bronze medal.

=== Continental championships ===
- November 7–14, 2015: 2015 Pacific-Asia Curling Championships in (Kazakhstan) Almaty
  - Men: South Korea (skip: Kim Soo-hyuk) defeated Japan (skip: Yusuke Morozumi), 11–7, to win their nation's second Pacific-Asia Curling Championships title.
    - China (skip: Zang Jialiang) took the bronze medal.
  - Women: Japan (skip: Satsuki Fujisawa) defeated South Korea (skip: Kim Ji-sun), 8–7, to win their nation's 14th Pacific-Asia Curling Championships title.
    - China (skip: Liu Sijia) took the bronze medal.
- November 20–28, 2015: 2015 European Curling Championships in (Denmark) Esbjerg
  - Men: Sweden (skip: Niklas Edin) defeated Switzerland (skip: Peter de Cruz), 7–6, to win their nation's second consecutive and ninth overall European Curling Championship title.
    - Norway (skip: Thomas Ulsrud took the bronze medal.
  - Women: Russia (skip: Anna Sidorova) defeated Scotland (skip: Eve Muirhead), 6–4, to win their nation's third European Curling Championship title.
    - Finland (skip: Oona Kauste) took the bronze medal.

=== World Curling Tour and Grand Slam of Curling ===
- September 8–13, 2015: 2015 GSOC Tour Challenge in Paradise, Newfoundland and Labrador (debut event)
  - Men: (Alberta) Kevin Koe (skip) defeated (Newfoundland and Labrador) Brad Gushue (skip), 4–3, to win this inaugural GSOC Tour Challenge title.
  - Women: (Switzerland) Silvana Tirinzoni (skip) defeated (Ontario) Rachel Homan (skip), 6–5, to win this inaugural GSOC Tour Challenge title.
- October 27 – November 1, 2015: 2015 The Masters Grand Slam of Curling in Truro, Nova Scotia
  - Men: (Manitoba) Mike McEwen (skip) defeated (British Columbia) Jim Cotter (skip), 5–3, to win his second Masters Grand Slam of Curling title.
  - Women: (Ontario) Rachel Homan (skip) defeated (Alberta) Valerie Sweeting (skip), 6–4, to win her third Masters Grand Slam of Curling title.
- November 11–15, 2015: 2015 The National in Oshawa
  - Men: (Newfoundland and Labrador) Brad Gushue (skip) defeated (Manitoba) Reid Carruthers (skip), 7–2, to win his second National title.
  - Women: Rachel Homan (skip) defeated fellow Ontario skip (Tracy Fleury), 5–4, to win the inaugural National title for women.
- December 8–13, 2015: 2015 Canadian Open of Curling in (Saskatchewan) Yorkton
  - Men: (Ontario) John Epping (skip) defeated (Newfoundland and Labrador) Brad Gushue (skip), 7–4, to win his first Canadian Open of Curling title.
  - Women: (Ontario) Rachel Homan (skip) defeated (Manitoba) Jennifer Jones (skip), 8–7, to win her first Canadian Open of Curling title.
- March 16–20: 2016 Elite 10 in Victoria, British Columbia (men only)
  - (Newfoundland and Labrador) Brad Gushue (skip) defeated (Manitoba) Reid Carruthers (skip), 4–3 in an extra end, to win their first Elite 10 title.
- April 12–17: 2016 Players' Championship in (Ontario) Toronto
  - Men: (Newfoundland and Labrador) Brad Gushue (skip) defeated (Ontario) Brad Jacobs, 5–4, to win his first Players' Championship title.
  - Women: (Scotland) Eve Muirhead (skip) defeated (Manitoba) Jennifer Jones (skip), 9–6, to win her second consecutive and third overall Players' Championship title.
- April 26 – May 1: 2016 Humpty's Champions Cup in (Alberta) Sherwood Park (debut event)
  - Men: (Manitoba) Reid Carruthers (skip) defeated (Ontario) John Epping (skip), 4–3, to win the inaugural Champions Cup title.
  - Women: (Manitoba) Jennifer Jones (skip) defeated (Ontario) Rachel Homan (skip), 7–5, to win the inaugural Champions Cup title.

== Figure skating ==
=== International figure skating events and Winter Youth Olympics ===
- January 25–31: 2016 European Figure Skating Championships in (Slovakia) Bratislava
  - Men's singles: (Spain) Javier Fernández
  - Ladies' singles: (Russia) Evgenia Medvedeva
  - Pairs: (Russia) Tatiana Volosozhar / Maxim Trankov
  - Ice dance: (France) Gabriella Papadakis / Guillaume Cizeron
- February 13–20: 2016 Winter Youth Olympics in (Norway) Lillehammer
  - Boys' singles: (gold) (Japan) Sōta Yamamoto; (silver) (Latvia) Deniss Vasiļjevs; (bronze) (Russia) Dmitri Aliev
  - Girls' singles: (gold) (Russia) Polina Tsurskaya; (silver) (Russia) Maria Sotskova; (bronze) (Kazakhstan) Elizabet Tursynbayeva
  - Pairs: (gold) (Russia) Ekaterina Borisova / Dmitry Sopot; (silver) (Czech Republic) Anna Dušková / Martin Bidař; (bronze) (Russia) Alina Ustimkina / Nikita Volodin
  - Ice dance: (gold) (Russia) Anastasia Shpilevaya / Grigory Smirnov; (silver) (United States) Chloe Lewis / Logan Bye; (bronze) (Russia) Anastasia Skoptsova / Kirill Aleshin
  - Mixed NOC team: (gold) Team Desire; (silver) Team Future; (bronze) Team Discovery
- February 16–21: 2016 Four Continents Figure Skating Championships in (Chinese Taipei) Taipei
  - Men's singles: (Canada) Patrick Chan
  - Ladies' singles: (Japan) Satoko Miyahara
  - Pairs: (China) Sui Wenjing / Han Cong
  - Ice dance: (United States) Maia Shibutani / Alex Shibutani
- March 14–20: 2016 World Junior Figure Skating Championships in (Hungary) Debrecen
  - Men's singles: (Israel) Daniel Samohin
  - Ladies' singles: (Japan) Marin Honda
  - Pairs: (Czech Republic) Anna Dušková / Martin Bidař
  - Ice dance: (United States) Lorraine McNamara / Quinn Carpenter
- March 28 – April 3: 2016 World Figure Skating Championships in (United States) Boston
  - Men's singles: (Spain) Javier Fernández
  - Ladies' singles: (Russia) Evgenia Medvedeva
  - Pairs: (Canada) Meagan Duhamel / Eric Radford
  - Ice dance: (France) Gabriella Papadakis / Guillaume Cizeron

=== 2015–16 ISU Grand Prix of Figure Skating ===
- October 23–25, 2015: 2015 Skate America in Milwaukee
  - Men's singles: (United States) Max Aaron
  - Ladies' singles: (Russia) Evgenia Medvedeva
  - Pairs: China (Sui Wenjing / Han Cong)
  - Ice dance: United States (Madison Chock / Evan Bates)
- October 30 – November 1, 2015: 2015 Skate Canada International in Lethbridge
  - Men's singles: (Canada) Patrick Chan
  - Ladies' singles: (United States) Ashley Wagner
  - Pairs: Canada (Meagan Duhamel / Eric Radford)
  - Ice dance: Canada (Kaitlyn Weaver / Andrew Poje)
- November 6–8, 2015: 2015 Cup of China in Beijing
  - Men's singles: (Spain) Javier Fernández
  - Ladies' singles: (Japan) Mao Asada
  - Pairs: Russia (Yuko Kavaguti / Alexander Smirnov)
  - Ice dance: Italy (Anna Cappellini / Luca Lanotte)
- November 13–15, 2015: 2015 Trophée Éric Bompard in (France) Bordeaux
  - Event cancelled, due to the November 2015 Paris attacks.
- November 20–22, 2015: 2015 Rostelecom Cup in Moscow
  - Men's singles: (Spain) Javier Fernández
  - Ladies' singles: (Russia) Elena Radionova
  - Pairs: Russia (Ksenia Stolbova / Fedor Klimov)
  - Ice dance: Canada (Kaitlyn Weaver / Andrew Poje)
- November 27–29, 2015: 2015 NHK Trophy in (Japan) Nagano
  - Men's singles: (Japan) Yuzuru Hanyu
  - Ladies' singles: (Japan) Satoko Miyahara
  - Pairs: Canada (Meagan Duhamel / Eric Radford)
  - Ice dance: United States (Maia Shibutani / Alex Shibutani)
- December 10–13, 2015: 2015–16 Grand Prix of Figure Skating Final in (Spain) Barcelona
  - Men's singles: (Japan) Yuzuru Hanyu
  - Ladies' singles: (Russia) Evgenia Medvedeva
  - Pairs: Russia (Ksenia Stolbova / Fedor Klimov)
  - Ice dance: Canada (Kaitlyn Weaver / Andrew Poje)

=== 2015–16 ISU Junior Grand Prix ===
- August 20–22: 2015 ISU Junior Grand Prix in Slovakia in Bratislava
  - Men's junior singles winner: (Canada) Roman Sadovsky
  - Women's junior singles winner: (Russia) Polina Tsurskaya
  - Mixed junior ice dance winners: (United States) (Rachel Parsons/Michael Parsons)
- August 26–30: 2015 ISU Junior Grand Prix in Latvia in Riga
  - Men's junior singles winner: (Russia) Dmitri Aliev
  - Women's junior singles winner: (Russia) Alisa Fedichkina
  - Mixed junior ice dance winners: (Russia) (Betina Popova/Yuri Vlasenko)
  - Mixed junior pairs winners: (Ukraine) (Renata Oganesian/Mark Bardei)
- September 2–6: 2015 ISU Junior Grand Prix in the United States in Colorado Springs, Colorado
  - Men's junior singles winner: (United States) Nathan Chen
  - Women's junior singles winner: (Japan) Yuna Shiraiwa
  - Mixed junior ice dance winners: (United States) (Lorraine McNamara / Quinn Carpenter)
  - Mixed junior pairs winners: (Russia) (Anastasia A. Gubanova / Alexei Sintsov)
- September 10–12: 2015 ISU Junior Grand Prix in Austria in Linz
  - Men's junior singles winner: (Russia) Dmitri Aliev
  - Women's junior singles winner: (Russia) Maria Sotskova
  - Mixed junior ice dance winners: Russia (Alla Loboda / Pavel Drozd)
  - Mixed junior pairs winners: Russia (Amina Atakhanova / Ilia Spiridonov)
- September 24–26: 2015 ISU Junior Grand Prix in Poland in Toruń
  - Men's junior singles winner: (Japan) Sōta Yamamoto
  - Women's junior singles winner: (Russia) Polina Tsurskaya
  - Mixed junior ice dance winners: United States (Lorraine McNamara / Quinn Carpenter)
  - Mixed junior pairs winners: Russia (Ekaterina Borisova / Dmitry Sopot)
- October 1–3: 2015 ISU Junior Grand Prix in Spain in Logroño
  - Men's junior singles winner: (United States) Nathan Chen
  - Women's junior singles winner: (Japan) Yuna Shiraiwa
  - Mixed junior ice dance winners: France (Marie-Jade Lauriault / Romain Le Gac)
- October 8–10: 2015 ISU Junior Grand Prix in Croatia in Zagreb
  - Men's junior singles winner: (Russia) Alexander Samarin
  - Women's junior singles winner: (Japan) Marin Honda
  - Mixed junior ice dance winner: United States (Rachel Parsons / Michael Parsons)
- December 10–12: 2015 ISU Junior Grand Prix in Spain in Barcelona (final)
  - Men's junior singles winner: (United States) Nathan Chen
  - Women's junior singles winner: (Russia) Polina Tsurskaya
  - Mixed junior pairs winners: Russia (Ekaterina Borisova, Dmitry Sopot)
  - Mixed junior ice dance winners: United States (Lorraine McNamara / Quinn Carpenter)

== Ice hockey ==
=== International ice hockey championships and Winter Youth Olympics ===
- December 26, 2015 – January 5, 2016: 2016 World Junior Ice Hockey Championships in Helsinki
  - Finland defeated Russia, 4–3 in overtime, to win their fourth World Junior Ice Hockey Championships title. The United States won the bronze medal.
- January 8–15: 2016 IIHF World Women's U18 Championship in St. Catharines
  - The United States defeated Canada, 3–2, to win their second consecutive and fifth overall IIHF World Women's U18 Championship title. Sweden took the bronze medal.
- February 12–21: 2016 Winter Youth Olympics in (Norway) Lillehammer
  - Boys' team winners: (gold) United States; (silver) Canada; (bronze) Russia
  - Boys' individual skills challenge winners: (gold) (Romania) Eduard Casaneanu; (silver) (Slovakia) Sebastián Čederle; (bronze) (Germany) Erik Betzold
  - Girls' team winners: (gold) Sweden; (silver) Czech Republic; (bronze) Switzerland
  - Girls' individual skills challenge winners: (gold) (Japan) Sena Takenaka; (silver) (Italy) Anita Muraro; (bronze) (Austria) Theresa Schafzahl
- March 28 – April 4: 2016 IIHF Women's World Championship in Kamloops
  - The United States defeated Canada, 1–0 in overtime, to win their third consecutive and seventh overall IIHF Women's World Championship title. Russia took the bronze medal.
- April 14–24: 2016 IIHF World U18 Championships in Grand Forks, North Dakota
  - Finland defeated Sweden, 6–1, to win their third IIHF World U18 Championships title. The United States took the bronze medal.
- May 6–22: 2016 IIHF World Championship in Moscow and Saint Petersburg
  - Canada defeated Finland, 2–0, to win their second consecutive and 26th overall IIHF World Championship title. Russia took the bronze medal.
- September 17 – October 1: 2016 World Cup of Hockey in Toronto
  - Canada defeated (European Union) Team Europe, 2–0 in games played, to win their second consecutive World Cup of Hockey title.

=== National Hockey League ===
- October 7, 2015 – April 10, 2016: 2015–16 NHL season
  - Presidents' Trophy winners: (Washington, D.C.) Washington Capitals
- January 1: 2016 NHL Winter Classic at Gillette Stadium in (United States) Foxborough, Massachusetts
  - The (Canada) Montreal Canadiens defeated the (United States) Boston Bruins 5–1.
- January 31: 61st National Hockey League All-Star Game at Bridgestone Arena in (United States) Nashville, Tennessee
  - Team Pacific defeated Team Atlantic, with the score of 1–0.
  - National Hockey League All-Star Game MVP: (Alberta) John Scott ( (Newfoundland and Labrador) St. John's IceCaps)
  - Bridgestone NHL Fastest Skater winner: (Michigan) Dylan Larkin ( (Michigan) Detroit Red Wings)
  - Honda NHL Breakaway Challenge winner: (Ontario) P. K. Subban ( (Quebec) Montreal Canadiens)
  - DraftKings NHL Accuracy Shooting winner: (Ontario) John Tavares ( (New York (state)) New York Islanders)
  - Gatorade NHL Skills Challenge Relay winners: Lefty One-Timer Group
  - AMP NHL Hardest Shot winner: (British Columbia) Shea Weber ( (Tennessee) Nashville Predators)
- April 13 – June 12: 2016 Stanley Cup playoffs
  - The (Pennsylvania) Pittsburgh Penguins defeated the (California) San Jose Sharks, 4–2 in games played, to win their fourth Stanley Cup title.
  - Conn Smythe Trophy Winner: (Nova Scotia) Sidney Crosby (Pittsburgh Penguins)
- June 24–25: 2016 NHL entry draft in (New York (state)) Buffalo, New York, at the First Niagara Center
  - #1 pick: (California) Auston Matthews to the (Ontario) Toronto Maple Leafs from the (Switzerland) ZSC Lions

==== 2016 NHL Stadium Series ====
- February 21: Series #1 at the TCF Bank Stadium in Minneapolis
  - The Minnesota Wild defeated the (Illinois) Chicago Blackhawks 6–1.
- February 27: Series #2 at Coors Field in Denver
  - The (Michigan) Detroit Red Wings defeated the Colorado Avalanche 5–3.

=== NCAA ===
- March 12–20: 2016 NCAA National Collegiate Women's Ice Hockey Tournament Frozen Four in Durham, New Hampshire at Whittemore Center
  - The Minnesota Golden Gophers defeated the (Massachusetts) Boston College Eagles, 3–1, to win their sixth NCAA National Collegiate Women's Ice Hockey title.
- April 7 & 9: 2016 NCAA Division I Men's Ice Hockey Tournament Frozen Four in Tampa, Florida, at Amalie Arena
  - The North Dakota Fighting Hawks defeated the (Connecticut) Quinnipiac Bobcats, 5–1, to win their eighth NCAA Division I Men's Ice Hockey title.

=== Kontinental Hockey League ===
- August 24, 2015 – April 19, 2016: 2015–16 KHL season
  - Continental Cup (KHL) winner: (Russia) HC CSKA Moscow
  - Top regular season scorer: (Russia) Sergei Mozyakin ( (Russia) Metallurg Magnitogorsk)
  - Gagarin Cup winners: (Russia) Metallurg Magnitogorsk (second Gagarin Cup title)
- January 23: 2016 Kontinental Hockey League All-Star Game in (Russia) Moscow at the VTB Ice Palace
  - Team West defeated Team East, with the score of 28–23.

=== CWHL ===
- October 17, 2015 – February 21, 2016: 2015–16 CWHL season
  - Commissioner's Trophy winners: (Quebec) Les Canadiennes
- January 23: 2nd Canadian Women's Hockey League All-Star Game in (Ontario) Toronto
  - Team Black defeated Team White 5–1.
- March 13: 2016 Clarkson Cup in (Ontario) Ottawa
  - The (Alberta) Calgary Inferno defeated the (Quebec) Montreal Les Canadiennes, 8–3, to win their first Clarkson Cup title.

=== NWHL ===
- March 5, 2016: 2016 Isobel Cup in Newark, New Jersey at the Barnabus Health Hockey House
  - The (Massachusetts) Boston Pride defeated the (New York (state)) Buffalo Beauts 3–1 to win the inaugural Isobel Cup.

=== Allan Cup ===
- April 11–16: 2016 Allan Cup in Steinbach, Manitoba at the T.G. Smith Centre
  - The (Alberta) Bentley Generals defeated the (Manitoba) South East Prairie Thunder, 4–3 in overtime, to win their third Allan Cup title.

=== AHL ===
- October 9, 2015 – April 17, 2016: 2015–16 AHL season
  - Macgregor Kilpatrick Trophy winners: (Ontario) Toronto Marlies
  - Season MVP: (Massachusetts) Chris Bourque
- April 20 – June 11: 2016 Calder Cup playoffs
  - The (Ohio) Lake Erie Monsters defeated the (Pennsylvania) Hershey Bears, 4–0 in games played, to win their first Calder Cup title.

=== Memorial Cup ===
- May 20–29: 2016 Memorial Cup in Red Deer, Alberta, at the ENMAX Centrium
  - The (Ontario) London Knights defeated the (Quebec) Rouyn-Noranda Huskies, 3–2 in overtime, to win their second Memorial Cup title.

== Luge ==
=== International luge championships and Winter Youth Olympics ===
- December 17–19, 2015: 2016 FIL American-Pacific Championships in Calgary
  - Men's singles winner: (United States) Chris Mazdzer
  - Women's singles winner: (United States) Erin Hamlin
  - Men's doubles winners: Canada (Tristan Walker, Justin Snith)
- December 24–27, 2015: 2016 FIL Asian Championships in (Japan) Nagano (debut event)
  - Men's singles winner: (Japan) Hidenari Kanayama
  - Women's singles winner: (South Korea) Enju Choi
  - Men's doubles winners: South Korea (Jin-Yong Park, Cho Jung-myung)
- January 15–16: Luge FIL Junior European Championships 2016 in Altenberg
  - Men's youth singles winner: (Austria) Bastian Schulte
  - Women's youth singles winner: (Germany) Anna Berreiter
  - Men's youth doubles #1 winners: Germany (Florian Löffler, Manuel Stiebing)
  - Men's youth doubles #2 winners: Germany (Tobias Heinze, Maximilian Illmann)
  - Men's junior singles winner: (Austria) Jonas Müller
  - Women's junior singles winner: (Germany) Jessica Tiebel
  - Mixed junior team winners: Germany (Jessica Tiebel, Paul-Lukas Heider, Florian Löffler, Manuel Stiebing)
- January 30–31: 2016 FIL World Luge Championships in Schönau am Königsee
  - Men's singles winner: (Germany) Felix Loch
  - Men's sprint winner: (Germany) Felix Loch
  - Women's singles winner: (Germany) Natalie Geisenberger
  - Women's sprint winner: (Switzerland) Martina Kocher
  - Men's doubles winners: Germany (Tobias Wendl, Tobias Arlt)
  - Men's doubles Sprint winners: Germany (Tobias Wendl, Tobias Arlt)
  - Team relay winners: Germany (Natalie Geisenberger, Felix Loch, Tobias Wendl / Tobias Arlt)
- February 5–7: Luge FIL Natural Track European Championships 2016 in Passeier Valley
  - Men's singles winner: (Austria) Thomas Kammerlander
  - Women's singles winner: (Italy) Evelin Lanthaler
  - Open natural track doubles winner: Italy (Patrick Pigneter, Florian Clara)
- February 6–7: 2016 FIL Junior World Championships in Winterberg
  - Junior men's singles winner: (Russia) Roman Repilov
  - Junior women's singles winner: (Germany) Julia Taubitz
  - Junior men's doubles winners: Austria (David Trojer, Philip Knoll)
  - Team relay winners: Germany (Julia Taubitz, Maximilian Jung, Julius Löffler / Stiebing)
- February 13–14: 47th FIL European Championships in Altenberg
  - Men's singles winner: (Germany) Felix Loch
  - Women's singles winner: (Germany) Tatjana Hüfner
  - Men's doubles winners: Germany (Toni Eggert, Sascha Benecken)
- February 14–16: 2016 Winter Youth Olympics in (Norway) Lillehammer
  - Boys' singles winners: (gold) (Latvia) Kristers Aparjods; (silver) (Germany) Paul-Lukas Heider; (bronze) (Canada) Reid Watts
  - Girls' singles winners: (gold) (Canada) Brooke Apshkrum; (silver) (Germany) Jessica Tiebel; (bronze) (Austria) Madeleine Egle
  - Doubles winners: (gold) (Italy) Felix Schwarz / Lukas Gufler; (silver) (Germany) Hannes Orlamuender / Paul Gubitz; (bronze) (Russia) Vsevolod Kashkin / Konstantin Korshunov
  - Mixed team relay winners: (gold) Germany; (silver) Russia; (bronze) Italy

=== 2015–16 Luge World Cup ===
- November 28–29, 2015: FIL World Cup #1 in (Austria) Innsbruck–Igls
  - Men's singles winner: (Italy) Dominik Fischnaller
  - Women's singles winner: (Germany) Dajana Eitberger
  - Men's doubles winners: Germany (Toni Eggert, Sascha Benecken)
- December 4–5, 2015: FIL World Cup #2 in (United States) Lake Placid, New York
  - Men's singles winner: (United States) Chris Mazdzer
  - Women's singles winner: (United States) Erin Hamlin
  - Men's doubles winners: Germany (Toni Eggert, Sascha Benecken)
- December 11–12, 2015: FIL World Cup #3 in (United States) Park City, Utah
  - Men's singles winner: (United States) Chris Mazdzer
  - Women's singles winner: (United States) Summer Britcher
  - Men's doubles winners: Germany (Tobias Wendl, Tobias Arlt)
- December 18–19, 2015: FIL World Cup #4 in (Canada) Calgary
  - Men's singles winner: (Germany) Felix Loch
  - Women's singles winner: (Germany) Natalie Geisenberger
  - Men's doubles winners: Germany (Toni Eggert, Sascha Benecken)
- January 9–10: FIL World Cup #5 in (Latvia) Sigulda
  - Men's singles winner: (Germany) Felix Loch
  - Women's singles winner: (Russia) Tatiana Ivanova
  - Men's doubles winners: Germany (Tobias Wendl, Tobias Arlt)
- January 16–17: FIL World Cup #6 in Oberhof, Germany
  - Men's singles winner: (Germany) Felix Loch
  - Women's singles winner: (Germany) Tatjana Hüfner
  - Men's doubles winners: Germany (Tobias Wendl, Tobias Arlt)
- February 6–7: FIL World Cup #7 in (Russia) Sochi
  - Men's singles winner: (Germany) Felix Loch
  - Women's singles winner: (Russia) Tatiana Ivanova
  - Men's doubles winners: Germany (Tobias Wendl, Tobias Arlt)
- February 13–14: FIL World Cup #8 in Altenberg
  - Men's singles winner: (Germany) Felix Loch
  - Women's singles winner: (Germany) Tatjana Hüfner
  - Men's doubles winners: Germany (Toni Eggert, Sascha Benecken)
- February 20–21: FIL World Cup #9 (final) in Winterberg
  - Men's singles winner: (Russia) Stepan Fedorov
  - Women's singles winner: (Germany) Tatjana Hüfner
  - Men's doubles winners: Germany (Toni Eggert, Sascha Benecken)

=== 2015–16 Luge Team Relay World Cup ===
- November 28–29, 2015: FIL World Team Relay Cup #1 in (Austria) Innsbruck–Igls
  - Winners: Germany (Dajana Eitberger, Andi Langenhan, Toni Eggert / Sascha Benecken)
- December 4–5, 2015: FIL World Team Relay Cup #2 in Lake Placid
  - Winners: United States (Erin Hamlin, Chris Mazdzer, Justin Krewson / Andrew Sherk)
- January 9–10: FIL World Team Relay Cup #3 in (Latvia) Sigulda
  - Winners: Germany (Tatjana Hüfner, Felix Loch, Tobias Wendl / Tobias Arlt)
- February 6–7: FIL World Team Relay Cup #4 in Sochi
  - Winners: Russia (Tatiana Ivanova, Semen Pavlichenko, Andrey Bogdanov, Andrey Medvedev)
- February 13–14: FIL World Team Relay Cup #5 in Altenberg
  - Winners: Germany (Tatjana Hüfner, Felix Loch, Toni Eggert / Sascha Benecken)
- February 20–21: FIL World Team Relay Cup #6 (final) in (Germany) Winterberg
  - Winners: Canada (Arianne Jones, Mitchel Malyk, Tristan Walker / Justin Snith)

=== 2015–16 Luge Sprint World Cup ===
- December 11–12, 2015: FIL Sprint World Cup #1 in (United States) Park City
  - Men's singles winner: (Austria) Wolfgang Kindl
  - Women's singles winner: (United States) Summer Britcher
  - Men's doubles winners: Italy (Christian Oberstolz, Patrick Gruber)
- December 18–19, 2015: FIL Sprint World Cup #2 in (Canada) Calgary
  - Men's singles winner: (Germany) Felix Loch
  - Women's singles winner: (United States) Summer Britcher
  - Men's doubles winners: Germany (Tobias Wendl, Tobias Arlt)
- January 16–17: FIL Sprint World Cup #3 (final) in Oberhof
  - Men's singles winner: (Germany) Felix Loch
  - Women's singles winner: (Germany) Natalie Geisenberger
  - Men's doubles winners: Germany (Tobias Wendl, Tobias Arlt)

=== 2015–16 FIL Luge Junior World Cup ===
- November 16–20: FIL Junior World Cup #1 in (Norway) Lillehammer
  - Men's junior singles winner: (Germany) Markus Hummer
  - Men's junior doubles winners: Russia (Evgeny Evdokimov, Alexey Groshev)
  - Men's youth singles winner: (Germany) Paul-Lukas Heider
  - Men's youth doubles winners: Italy (Felix Schwarz, Lukas Gufler)
  - Women's junior singles winner: (Austria) Madeleine Egle
  - Women's youth singles winner: (Russia) Olesya Mikhaylenko
  - Men's junior team winners: Russia
  - Mixed junior/youth team relay winners: Italy
- November 27–28: FIL Junior World Cup #2 in (Latvia) Sigulda
  - Men's youth singles winner: (Germany) Paul-Lukas Heider
  - Women's youth singles winner: (Russia) Kristina Shamova
  - Men's youth doubles winners: Russia (Andrej Shander, Semen Mikov)
  - Men's junior singles winner: (Russia) Daniil Lebedev
  - Men's junior doubles winners: Russia (Grigoriy Voloskov, Mikhail Dementiev)
  - Women's youth singles winner: (Russia) Olesya Mikhaylenko
- December 5–6: FIL Junior World Cup #3 in Schönau am Königssee
  - Men's youth singles winner: (Germany) Thomas Jaensch
  - Women's youth singles winner: (Germany) Tina Müller
  - Men's youth doubles winners: Germany (Tobias Heinze, Maximilian Illmann)
  - Men's junior singles winner: (Italy) Theo Gruber
  - Women's junior singles winner: (Germany) Jessica Tiebel
  - Men's junior doubles winners: Russia (Evgeny Evdokimov, Alexey Groshev)
- December 11–12: FIL Junior World Cup #4 in Innsbruck
  - Men's youth singles winner: (Germany) Paul-Lukas Heider
  - Women's youth singles winner: (Germany) Tina Müller
  - Men's youth doubles winners: Germany (Tobias Heinze, Maximilian Illmann)
  - Men's junior singles winner: (Latvia) Krisrers Aparjods
  - Women's junior singles winner: (Germany) Jessica Tiebel
  - Men's junior doubles winners: Russia (Evgeny Evdokimov, Alexey Groshev)
  - Mixed junior team winners: Austria
- January 15–16: FIL Junior World Cup #5 in Altenberg
  - Men's youth singles winner: (Austria) Bastian Schulte
  - Women's youth singles winner: (Germany) Anna Berreiter
  - Men's youth doubles #1 winners: Germany (Florian Löffler, Manuel Stiebing)
  - Men's youth doubles #2 winners: Germany (Tobias Heinze, Maximilian Illmann)
  - Men's junior singles winner: (Austria) Jonas Müller
  - Women's junior singles winner: (Germany) Jessica Tiebel
  - Mixed junior team winners: Germany
- January 22–23: FIL Junior World Cup #6 (final) in Oberhof
  - Men's youth singles winner: (Italy) Fabian Malleier
  - Women's youth singles winner: (Germany) Anna Berreiter
  - Men's youth doubles #1 winners: Germany (Florian Löffler, Manuel Stiebing)
  - Men's youth doubles #2 winners: Russia (Andrey Shander, Semen Mikov)
  - Men's junior singles winner: (Austria) Jonas Müller
  - Women's junior singles winner: (Germany) Tina Müller
  - Mixed junior team winners: Germany

=== Luge FIL Natural Track World Cup 2015–2016 ===
- December 12–13, 2015: FIL Natural Track World Cup #1 in (Austria) Kühtai Ski Resort
  - Men's natural singles winner: (Italy) Patrick Pigneter
  - Women's natural singles winner: (Austria) Tina Unterberger
  - Open natural track doubles winners: Italy (Patrick Pigneter, Florian Clara)
- January 9–10, 2016: FIL Natural Track World Cup #2 in Latsch
  - Men's natural singles winner: (Italy) Patrick Pigneter
  - Women's natural singles winner: (Italy) Evelin Lanthaler
  - Open natural track doubles winners: Italy (Patrick Pigneter, Florian Clara)
- January 16–17, 2016: FIL Natural Track World Cup #3 in (Romania) Vatra Dornei
  - Men's natural singles winner: (Italy) Patrick Pigneter
  - Women's natural singles winner: (Italy) Evelin Lanthaler
  - Open natural track doubles winners: Italy (Patrick Pigneter, Florian Clara)
- January 23–24, 2016: FIL Natural Track World Cup #4 in (Russia) Moscow
  - Men's natural singles winner: (Russia) Aleksandr Yegorov
  - Women's natural singles winner: (Russia) Yekaterina Lavrentyeva
  - Open natural track doubles winners: Italy (Patrick Pigneter, Florian Clara)
- January 29–31, 2016: FIL Natural Track World Cup #5 in Deutschnofen
  - Men's natural singles winner: (Italy) Alex Gruber
  - Women's natural singles winner: (Italy) Evelin Lanthaler
  - Open natural track doubles winners: Italy (Patrick Pigneter, Florian Clara)

=== Luge FIL Junior Natural Track World Cup 2015–2016 ===
- December 12–13, 2015: FIL Natural Junior Track World Cup #1 in (Austria) Winterleiten
  - Men's natural singles winner: (Austria) Fabian Achenrainer
  - Women's natural singles winner: (Germany) Theresa Maurer
  - Open natural track doubles winners: Poland (Rafał Zasuwa, Paweł Spratek)
- January 5–6, 2016: FIL Natural Junior Track World Cup #2 in Seiser Alm
  - Men's natural singles winner: (New Zealand) Jack Leslie
  - Women's natural singles winner: (Italy) Daniela Mittermair
  - Open natural track doubles winners: Italy (Simone Scalet, Simone Gaio)
- January 17, 2016: FIL Natural Junior Track World Cup #3 in (Austria) Umhausen
  - Men's natural singles winner: (Austria) Fabian Achenrainer
  - Women's natural singles winner: (Germany) Teresa Mauerer
  - Open natural track doubles winners: Germany (Josef Limmer, Florian Limmer)
- January 23–24, 2016: FIL Natural Junior Track World Cup #4 (final) in (Austria) Kindberg
  - Men's natural singles winner: (Austria) Florian Markt
  - Women's natural singles winner: (Germany) Teresa Mauerer
  - Open natural track doubles winners: Italy (Manuel Gaio, Nicolo Debertolis)

== Speed skating ==
=== 2015–16 ISU Speed Skating World Cup ===
- November 13–15, 2015: ISU LTSS World Cup #1 in (Canada) Calgary
  - The Netherlands won both the gold and overall medal tallies.
- November 20–22, 2015: ISU LTSS World Cup #2 in Salt Lake City
  - China, the Netherlands, and Russia won 3 gold medals each. The United States won the overall medal tally.
- December 4–6, 2015: ISU LTSS World Cup #3 in (Germany) Inzell
  - The Netherlands won both the gold and overall medal tallies.
- December 11–13, 2015: ISU LTSS World Cup #4 in Heerenveen #1
  - The Netherlands won both the gold and overall medal tallies.
- January 29–31: ISU LTSS World Cup #5 in (Norway) Stavanger
  - Russia won the gold medal tally. The Netherlands won the overall medal tally.
- March 11–13: ISU LTSS World Cup #6 (final) in Heerenveen #2
  - The Netherlands won both the gold and overall medal tallies.

=== Speed Skating ISU Junior World Cup 2015–2016 ===
- November 14–15, 2015: ISU Junior LTSS World Cup #1 in (Netherlands) Groningen
  - Men's junior 500 m winner: (Russia) Viktor Mushtakov
  - Men's junior 1000 m winner: (Russia) Mikhail Kazelin
  - Men's junior 1500 m winner: (Netherlands) Marcel Bosker
  - Men's junior 3000 m winner: (Netherlands) Marcel Bosker
  - Men's junior mass start winner: (Netherlands) Marcel Bosker
  - Men's junior team sprint winners: Russia
  - Women's junior 500 m winner: (China) Xue Lin
  - Women's junior 1000 m winner: (Japan) Rio Yamada
  - Women's junior 1500 m winner: (Japan) Ayano Sato
  - Women's junior 3000 m winner: (China) Mei Han
  - Women's junior mass start winner: (Japan) Ayano Sato
  - Women's junior team sprint winners: China
- November 28–29, 2015: ISU Junior LTSS World Cup #2 in (Germany) Berlin
  - Men's junior 500 m winner: (Japan) Tatsuya Shinhama
  - Women's junior 500 m winner: (Russia) Darya Kachanova
  - Men's junior 1000 m winner: (Russia) Viktor Mushtakov
  - Women's junior 1000 m winner: (Russia) Darya Kachanova
  - Men's junior 1500 m winner: (Russia) Viktor Mushtakov
  - Women's junior 1500 m winner: (China) Mei Han
  - Men's junior 3000 m winner: (Netherlands) Marcel Bosker
  - Women's junior 3000 m winner: (Japan) Ayano Sato
  - Men's junior mass start winner: (South Korea) Min-Seok Kim
  - Women's junior mass start winner: (Japan) Ayano Sato
  - Men's team sprint winners: Russia
  - Women's team sprint winners: Japan
- January 16–17, 2015: ISU Junior LTSS World Cup #3 in (Italy) Baselga di Pinè
  - Women's junior 500 m winner: (Russia) Darya Kachanova
  - Men's junior 500 m winner: (Estonia) Marten Liiv
  - Women's junior 1500 m winner: (South Korea) Ji-Woo Park
  - Men's junior 1500 m winner: (South Korea) Ki-Woong Park
  - Women's junior team pursuit winners: South Korea
  - Men's junior team pursuit winners: South Korea
  - Women's junior 1000 m winner: (Russia) Darya Kachanova
  - Men's junior 1000 m winner: (Italy) Francesco Tescari
  - Women's junior 3000 m winner: (South Korea) Ji-Woo Park
  - Men's junior 3000 m winner: (Netherlands) Marcel Bosker
  - Women's junior mass start winner: (South Korea) Cho-Won Park
  - Men's junior mass start winner: (Netherlands) Marcel Bosker

==== Other long track speed skating events and Winter Youth Olympics ====
- January 9–10: 2016 European Speed Skating Championships in (Belarus) Minsk
  - Men's Allround winner: (Netherlands) Sven Kramer
  - Women's Allround winner: (Czech Republic) Martina Sáblíková
- February 11–14: 2016 World Single Distance Speed Skating Championships in (Russia) Kolomna
  - The Netherlands won both the gold and overall medal tallies.
- February 13–19: 2016 Winter Youth Olympics in (Norway) Lillehammer
  - Boys' 500 m winners: (gold) (China) LI Yanzhe; (silver) (Japan) Kazuki Sakakibara; (bronze) (South Korea) CHUNG Jae-woong
  - Boys' 1500 m winners: (gold) (South Korea) Kim Min-seok; (silver) (Japan) Daichi Horikawa; (bronze) (Netherlands) Daan Baks
  - Boys' mass start winners: (gold) (South Korea) Kim Min-seok; (silver) (South Korea) CHUNG Jae-woong; (bronze) (Norway) Allan Dahl Johansson
  - Girls' 500 m winners: (gold) (South Korea) KIM Min-sun; (silver) (China) Mei Han; (bronze) (China) LI Huawei
  - Girls' 1500 m winners: (gold) (South Korea) Park Ji-woo; (silver) (China) Mei Han; (bronze) (Italy) Noemi Bonazza
  - Girls' mass start winners: (gold) (South Korea) Park Ji-woo; (silver) (China) Mei Han; (bronze) (South Korea) KIM Min-sun
  - Mixed NOC team sprint winners: (gold) (International Olympic Committee) Team 6; (silver) (International Olympic Committee) Team 9; (bronze) (International Olympic Committee) Team 10
- February 27–28: 2016 World Sprint Speed Skating Championships in (South Korea) Seoul
  - Men's overall winner: (Russia) Pavel Kulizhnikov
  - Women's overall winner: (United States) Brittany Bowe
- February 29 – March 6: World University Speed Skating Championship in Baselga di Pinè
  - Men's 500 m #1 winner: (Italy) Mirko Giacomo Nenzi
  - Men's 500 m #2 winner: (Italy) Mirko Giacomo Nenzi
  - Women's 500 m #1 winner: (China) Li Qishi
  - Women's 500 m #2 winner: (China) Li Qishi
  - Men's 1000 m winner: (Italy) Mirko Giacomo Nenzi
  - Women's 1000 m winner: (China) Li Qishi
  - Men's 1500 m winner: (Hungary) Konrád Nagy
  - Women's 1500 m winner: (Poland) Katarzyna Woźniak
  - Women's 3000 m winner: (Japan) Nana Takahashi
  - Men's 5000 m winner: (Italy) Davide Ghiotto
  - Women's 5000 m winner: (Japan) Nana Takahashi
  - Men's 10000 m winner: (Italy) Davide Ghiotto
  - Men's mass start winner: (Italy) Riccardo Bugari
  - Women's mass start winner: (Netherlands) Annemarie Boer
  - Men's team sprint winners: Italy
  - Women's team sprint winners: Russia
  - Men's team pursuit winners: Poland
  - Women's team pursuit winners: Poland
- March 5–6: 2016 World Allround Speed Skating Championships in (Germany) Berlin
  - Men's overall winner: (Netherlands) Sven Kramer
  - Women's overall winner: (Czech Republic) Martina Sáblíková
- March 11–13: 2016 World Junior Speed Skating Championships in (China) Changchun
  - Men's overall winner: (Canada) Benjamin Donnelly
  - Women's overall winner: (Russia) Elizaveta Kazelina

=== 2015–16 ISU Short Track Speed Skating World Cup ===
- October 30 – November 1, 2015: ISU STSS World Cup #1 in Montreal
  - South Korea won the gold medal tally. South Korea, Canada, and China won 7 overall medals each.
- November 6–8, 2015: ISU STSS World Cup #2 in Toronto
  - South Korea won the gold medal tally. South Korea and Canada won 11 overall medals each.
- December 4–6, 2015: ISU STSS World Cup #3 in (Japan) Nagoya
  - South Korea won the gold medal tally. Canada won the overall medal tally.
- December 11–13, 2015: ISU STSS World Cup #4 in (China) Shanghai
  - South Korea won both the gold and overall medal tallies.
- February 5–7: ISU STSS World Cup #5 in (Germany) Dresden
  - Canada won the gold medal tally. South Korea won the overall medal tally.
- February 12–14: ISU STSS World Cup #6 (final) in (Netherlands) Dordrecht
  - Canada and South Korea won 3 gold medals each. South Korea won the overall medal tally.

==== Other short track speed skating events and Winter Youth Olympics ====
- January 22–24: 2016 European Short Track Speed Skating Championships in (Russia) Sochi
  - Great Britain won the gold medal tally. The Netherlands won the overall medal tally.
- January 29–31: 2016 World Junior Short Track Speed Skating Championships in (Bulgaria) Sofia
  - China won both the gold and overall medal tallies.
- February 14–20: 2016 Winter Youth Olympics in (Norway) Lillehammer
  - Boys' 500 m winners: (gold) (South Korea) HONG Kyung-hwan; (silver) (Japan) Kazuki Yoshinaga; (bronze) (China) Ma Wei
  - Boys' 1000 m winners: (gold) (South Korea) HWANG Dae-heon; (silver) (China) Ma Wei; (bronze) (Hungary) LIU Shaoang
  - Girls' 500 m winners: (gold) (China) ZANG Yize; (silver) (Hungary) Petra Jászapáti; (bronze) (Bulgaria) Katrin Manoilova
  - Girls' 1000 m winners: (gold) (South Korea) KIM Ji-yoo; (silver) (South Korea) LEE Su-youn; (bronze) (Germany) Anna Seidel
  - Mixed NOC team relay winners: (gold) (International Olympic Committee) Team B; (silver) (International Olympic Committee) Team C; (bronze) (International Olympic Committee) Team F
- March 11–13: 2016 World Short Track Speed Skating Championships in (South Korea) Seoul
  - Men's overall winner: (China) Han Tianyu
  - Women's overall winner: (South Korea) Choi Min-jeong

== See also ==
- 2016 in athletics (track and field)
- 2016 in skiing
- 2016 in sports
