= 2009 in ice sports =

== Bandy ==
=== World Championship ===
- January 18 – 25: 2009 Bandy World Championship in Västerås
  - Division A: Sweden defeated Russia, 6–1, to win the Bandy World Championship title. Finland took the bronze medal.
  - Division B: United States won the preliminary round and played a qualifying match against Belarus for Division A, but lost 1–3, thus not replacing Belarus in Division A next year.

== Curling ==
=== World Championship ===
- April 4–12, 2009, 2009 World Men's Curling Championship
  - Scotland (Murdoch) defeated Canada (Martin), 7–6, to win Scotland's fifth World Championship title. Switzerland (Stöckli) won the bronze medal.

== Figure skating ==
During the season, the following skaters won ISU Championships.

Discipline	World Championships	European Championships	Four Continents Championships	World Junior Championship
Men	Evan Lysacek	Brian Joubert	Patrick Chan	Adam Rippon
Ladies	Yuna Kim	Laura Lepistö	Yuna Kim	Alena Leonova
Pair skating	Aliona Savchenko / Robin Szolkowy	Aliona Savchenko / Robin Szolkowy	Pang Qing / Tong Jian	Lubov Iliushechkina / Nodari Maisuradze
Ice Dancing	Oksana Domnina / Maxim Shabalin	Jana Khokhlova / Sergei Novitski	Meryl Davis / Charlie White	Madison Chock / Greg Zuerlein

== Ice hockey ==
- January 1 – 2009 NHL Winter Classic between Chicago Blackhawks and Detroit Red Wings played at Wrigley Field.
- April 18 – Bentley Generals win 2009 Allan Cup Canadian senior championship.
- April 19 – Ak Bars Kazan win 2009 Gagarin Cup.
- May 9 – Phoenix Coyotes file for bankruptcy.
- May 10 – Russia defeats Canada 2–1 to win the 2009 IIHF World Championship.
- May 24 – Windsor Spitfires win 2009 Memorial Cup Canadian junior championship.
- June 12 – Pittsburgh Penguins defeat the Detroit Red Wings to win the 2009 Stanley Cup. Evgeni Malkin is awarded the Conn Smythe Trophy.
- June 26–27 – 2009 NHL entry draft held in Montreal.
- September 29 – ZSC Lions defeat the Chicago Blackhawks to win the 2009 Victoria Cup.
- December 4 – 100th anniversary of the Montreal Canadiens hockey club.
- Martin Brodeur breaks all records and passes Patrick Roy in many categories
- Pittsburgh Penguins win the Stanley Cup against the Detroit Red Wings
- Team Rusich Podolsk is founded in Podolsk, Russia.

== Synchronized skating ==
Championships and major cups
Competition	Gold	Silver	Bronze	Source
World Championships	(Canada) NEXXICE	(Finland) Team Unique	(Sweden) Team Surprise	
Junior World Challenge Cup	(Finland) Team Fintastic	(Canada) NEXXICE	(Finland) Musketeers	
Other senior internationals
Competition	Gold	Silver	Bronze	Source
Prague Cup	(Finland) Marigold IceUnity	(Finland) Team Unique	(Sweden) Team Surprise	
French Cup	(Finland) Team Unique	(Finland) Rockettes	(United States) Haydenettes	
15th Spring Cup	(Germany) Team Berlin 1	(United States) California Gold	(Sweden) Team Boomerang	
Jegvirag Cup	(United States) Western Michigan University	(Hungary) Passion	(Sweden) Seaside	
24th Winter Universiade	(Sweden) Team Surprise	(Finland) Rockettes	(Russia) Paradise	

== See also ==
- 2009 in skiing
- 2009 in sports
