= 2013 in ice sports =

== Bandy ==
=== World Championship ===
- January 27 – February 3: 2013 Bandy World Championship in Vänersborg
  - Division A: Russia defeated Sweden, 4–3, to win their seventh overall Bandy World Championship title. Kazakhstan took the bronze medal.
  - Division B: United States defeated Canada, 4–2, in the final, and is qualified for Division A next year. Latvia took third place.

=== World Cup ===
- Final game, 2012 Bandy World Cup, October: Zorky Krasnogorsk (Russia) defeated Yenisey Krasnoyarsk (Russia), 3–0

=== World Cup Women ===
- Final game, 2012 Bandy World Cup Women, October: won by Rekord Irkutsk (Russia)

=== National champions ===
- Finland: Helsinki IFK (men), Veitsiluodon Vastus (women)
- Norway: Ullevål IL (men), Drammen Bandy (women)
- Russia: Dynamo Moscow (men)
- Sweden: Hammarby IF (men), Sandvikens AIK (women)
- Ukraine: Avangard Budy (men)
- United States: Dynamo Duluth (men)

=== International Youth Championships ===
- G17 World Championship
  - Winner: Sweden
- U17 World Championship
  - Winner: Finland
- U23 World Championship
  - Winner: Russia

== Bobsleigh and skeleton ==
- 2012–13 Bobsleigh World Cup
  - Two-man overall winner: (Canada) Lyndon Rush
  - Four-man overall winner: (Russia) Alexandr Zubkov
  - Two-women overall winner: (Canada) Kaillie Humphries
- 2012–13 Skeleton World Cup
  - Men's overall winner: (Latvia) Martins Dukurs
  - Women's overall winner: (Germany) Marion Thees
- The FIBT World Championships 2013 took place at the St. Moritz-Celerina Olympic Bobrun at St. Moritz, Switzerland.
  - Two-man bobsleigh winner: (Germany) Francesco Friedrich / Jannis Bäcker
  - Four-man bobsleigh winner: (Germany) Maximilian Arndt / Marko Hübenbecker / Alexander Rödiger / Martin Putze
  - Two-women bobsleigh winner: (Canada) Kaillie Humphries / Chelsea Valois
  - Men's skeleton winner: (Russia) Aleksandr Tretyakov
  - Women's skeleton winner: (United Kingdom) Shelley Rudman

== Curling ==
Season of Champions

- Canada Cup of Curling (Moose Jaw, Saskatchewan, November 28 – December 2)
  - Men's winner: (Manitoba) Jeff Stoughton def. (Ontario) Glenn Howard
  - Women's winner: (Saskatchewan) Stefanie Lawton def. (Manitoba) Kaitlyn Lawes
- Continental Cup of Curling (Penticton, British Columbia, 10–13 January)
  - Winner: Team North America
- M&M Meat Shops Canadian Junior Curling Championships (Fort McMurray, Alberta, 31 January – 10 February)
  - Men's winner: Manitoba (Matt Dunstone, skip)
  - Women's winner: British Columbia (Corryn Brown, skip)
- Scotties Tournament of Hearts (Kingston, Ontario, 16–24 February)
  - Winner: Ontario (Rachel Homan, skip)
- Tim Hortons Brier (Edmonton, Alberta, March 2–10)
  - Winner: Northern Ontario (Brad Jacobs, skip)

Grand slams

- Curlers Corner Autumn Gold Curling Classic (Calgary, Alberta, October 5–8)
  - Women's winner: (Ontario) Sherry Middaugh def. (Ontario) Rachel Homan
- Manitoba Lotteries Women's Curling Classic (Winnipeg, Manitoba, October 19–22)
  - Women's winner: (Saskatchewan) Stefanie Lawton def. (Ontario) Rachel Homan
- Colonial Square Ladies Classic (Saskatoon, Saskatchewan, November 9–12)
  - Women's winner: (Saskatchewan) Stefanie Lawton def. (Manitoba) Chelsea Carey
- The Masters Grand Slam of Curling (Brantford, Ontario, November 14–18)
  - Men's winner: (Alberta) Kevin Koe def. (British Columbia) Jim Cotter
  - Women's winner: (Ontario) Rachel Homan def. (Manitoba) Chelsea Carey
- Canadian Open of Curling (Kelowna, British Columbia, December 12–16)
  - Men's winner: (Ontario) Glenn Howard def. (Ontario) Brad Jacobs
- The Pomeroy Inn & Suites National (Port Hawkesbury, Nova Scotia, 23–27 January)
  - Winner: (Manitoba) Jeff Stoughton (skip)
- The Players' Championship (Toronto, Ontario, April 16–21)
  - Men's winner: (Ontario) Glenn Howard
  - Women's winner: (Scotland) Eve Muirhead

World championships

- World Wheelchair Curling Championship (Sochi, Russia, 16–23 February)
  - Winner: Canada (Jim Armstrong, skip)
- World Junior Curling Championships (Sochi, Russia, 28 February – 10 March)
  - Men's winner: Scotland (Kyle Smith, skip)
  - Women's winner: Russia (Alina Kovaleva, skip)
- World Women's Curling Championship (Riga, Latvia, March 16–24)
  - Winner: Scotland (Eve Muirhead, skip)
- World Men's Curling Championship (Victoria, British Columbia, March 30 – April 7)
  - Winner: Sweden (Niklas Edin, skip)
- World Senior Curling Championships (Fredericton, New Brunswick, April 13–20)
  - Men's winner: Canada (Rob Armitage, skip)
  - Women's winner: Canada (Cathy King, skip)
- World Mixed Doubles Curling Championship (Fredericton, New Brunswick, April 13–20)
  - Winner: Hungary Zsolt Kiss / Dorottya Palancsa

== Figure skating ==
- 21–27 January: 2013 European Figure Skating Championships in Zagreb, Croatia
  - Men: (Spain) Javier Fernandez (first title).
  - Ladies: (Italy) Carolina Kostner (fifth title).
  - Pairs: (Russia) Tatiana Volosozhar / Maxim Trankov (second title).
  - Ice dance: (Russia) Ekaterina Bobrova / Dmitri Soloviev (first title).
- 5–10 February: 2013 Four Continents Figure Skating Championships in Osaka, Japan
  - Men: (Canada) Kevin Reynolds (first title).
  - Ladies: (Japan) Mao Asada (third title).
  - Pairs: (Canada) Meagan Duhamel / Eric Radford (first title).
  - Ice dance: (United States) Meryl Davis / Charlie White (third title).
- 25 February – 3 March: 2013 World Junior Figure Skating Championships in Milan, Italy
  - Men: (United States) Joshua Farris (first title).
  - Ladies: (Russia) Elena Radionova (first title).
  - Pairs: (United States) Haven Denney / Brandon Frazier (first title).
  - Ice dance: (Russia) Alexandra Stepanova / Ivan Bukin (first title).
- March 10 – 17: 2013 World Figure Skating Championships in London, Ontario, Canada
  - Men: (Canada) Patrick Chan (third consecutive title).
  - Ladies: (South Korea) Yuna Kim (second title).
  - Pairs: (Russia) Tatiana Volosozhar / Maxim Trankov (first title).
  - Ice dance: (United States) Meryl Davis / Charlie White (second title).
- April 11 – 14: 2013 ISU World Team Trophy in Figure Skating in Tokyo
  - Team Champions: United States; Second: Canada; Third: Japan

== Ice hockey ==
- 26 December – 5 January: 2013 World Junior Ice Hockey Championships in Russia
  - The United States defeated defending champion Sweden 3–1 to win their third title. John Gibson was named MVP of the tournament.
- 29 December – 5 January: 2013 IIHF World Women's U18 Championship in Finland
  - Canada defeats the United States 2–1 in overtime to win their third title.
- April 2 – 9: 2013 IIHF Women's World Championship in Canada
  - The United States defeated Canada 3–2 to claim its fifth title in this championship.
- April 18 – 28: 2013 IIHF World U18 Championships in Russia
  - Canada defeats the United States 3–2 to claim its third title in this event.
- May 3 – 19: 2013 IIHF World Championship in Sweden and Finland
  - Sweden defeated Switzerland 5–1 to win its ninth title for this championship. Roman Josi, of the NHL's Nashville Predators, was named MVP of the tournament.
- June 12 – 24: 2013 Stanley Cup Finals
  - Winner: (Illinois) Chicago Blackhawks (fifth title).

== Luge ==
- 24 November 2012 – 24 February 2013: 2012–13 Luge World Cup
  - Germany won all the gold medals in the four events for this sport.
- 1–2 February: The FIL World Luge Championships 2013 were held at the Whistler Sliding Centre in Canada
  - Germany won the gold and overall medal tallies.

== Short-track speed skating ==
- 19 October 2012 – 12 February 2013: 2012–13 ISU Short Track Speed Skating World Cup
  - South Korea won both the gold and overall medal tallies.
- March 8 – 10: The 2013 World Short Track Speed Skating Championships took place at the Főnix Hall, in Debrecen, Hungary
  - South Korea won both the gold and overall medal tallies.

== Speed skating (long-track) ==
- 16 November 2012 – 10 March 2013: 2012–13 ISU Speed Skating World Cup
  - Netherlands won both the gold and overall medal tallies.
- 26–27 January: The 2013 World Sprint Speed Skating Championships were held at the Utah Olympic Oval, in Salt Lake City, United States
  - Men's winner: (Netherlands) Michel Mulder (first title).
  - Women's winner: (United States) Heather Richardson (first title).
- 15–16 February: The 2013 World Allround Speed Skating Championships were held at the Vikingskipet (Hamar Olympic Hall), in Hamar, Norway
  - Men's winner: (Netherlands) Sven Kramer (sixth title).
  - Women's winner: (Netherlands) Ireen Wüst (fourth title).
- 21–24 March: The 2013 World Single Distance Speed Skating Championships were held at the Adler Arena Skating Center, in Sochi, Russia
  - Netherlands won both the gold and overall medal tallies.
