= 2011 in ice sports =

== Bandy ==
=== World Championship ===
- January 23 – 30: 2011 Bandy World Championship in Kazan
  - Division A: Russia defeated Finland, 6–1, to win the Bandy World Championship title. Sweden took the bronze medal.
  - Division B: Belarus won the preliminary round and played a qualifying match against United States for Division A, but lost 2–5, thus not replacing USA in Division A next year.

=== National champions ===
- Finland: Helsingfors IFK (men), Helsingfors IFK (women)
- Norway: Stabæk IF (men), Stabæk IF (women)
- Russia: HK Dynamo Kazan (men)
- Sweden: Sandvikens AIK (men), Kareby IS (women)
- United States: Minnesota Blades (men)

=== World Cup ===
- October 2010: (Russia) Dynamo Kazan wins Bandy World Cup

=== Other ===
- 3rd-5 December 2010: Russian Government Cup – Russia wins

== Curling ==
Season of Champions

- Continental Cup of Curling (St. Albert, Alberta, Jan. 13–16)
  - Winner: (Canada) (United States) North America def. (United Nations) World
- M&M Meat Shops Canadian Junior Curling Championships (Calgary, Alberta, Jan. 29 – Feb. 6)
  - Men's winner: (Saskatchewan) Braeden Moskowy def. (Ontario) Mathew Camm
  - Women's winner: (Saskatchewan) Trish Paulsen def. (Alberta) Nadine Chyz
- Scotties Tournament of Hearts (Charlottetown, Prince Edward Island, Feb. 19–27)
  - Women's winner: (Saskatchewan) Amber Holland def. (Canada) Jennifer Jones
- Tim Hortons Brier (London, Ontario, Mar. 5–13)
  - Men's winner: (Manitoba) Jeff Stoughton def. (Ontario) Glenn Howard
- Ford World Men's Curling Championship (Regina, Saskatchewan, Apr. 2–10)
  - Men's winner: Canada (Jeff Stoughton) def. Scotland (Tom Brewster)

Grand Slams

- BDO Canadian Open of Curling (Oshawa, Ontario, Jan. 26–30)
  - Men's winner: (Manitoba) Mike McEwen def. (Ontario) Glenn Howard
- GP Car and Home Players' Championship (Grande Prairie, Alberta, Apr. 12–18)
  - Men's winner: (Alberta) Kevin Martin def. (Sweden) Niklas Edin
  - Women's winner: (Manitoba) Jennifer Jones def. (Ontario) Rachel Homan

World Championships

- World Wheelchair Curling Championship (Prague, Czech Republic, Feb. 21 – Mar. 1)
  - Winner: Canada (Jim Armstrong) def. Scotland (Aileen Neilson)
- World Junior Curling Championships (Perth, Scotland, Mar. 5–13)
  - Men's winner: Sweden (Oskar Eriksson) def. Switzerland (Peter de Cruz)
  - Women's winner: Scotland (Eve Muirhead) def. Canada (Trish Paulsen)
- Capital One World Women's Curling Championship (Esbjerg, Denmark, Mar. 19–27)
  - Men's winner: Sweden (Anette Norberg) def. Canada (Amber Holland)
- Ford World Men's Curling Championship (Regina, Saskatchewan, Apr. 2–10)
  - Men's winner: Canada (Jeff Stoughton) def. Scotland (Tom Brewster)
- World Mixed Doubles Curling Championship (St. Paul, Minnesota, Apr. 15–24)
  - Winner: Switzerland def. Russia
- World Senior Curling Championships (St. Paul, Minnesota, Apr. 15–24)
  - Men's winner: Canada (Mark Johnson) def. United States (Geoff Goodland)
  - Women's winner: Canada (Christine Jurgenson) def. Sweden (Ingrid Meldahl)

== Figure skating ==
- December 10–12, 2010 – 2010–11 Grand Prix of Figure Skating Final in Beijing

== Ice hockey ==
- December 11: The attendance record set in May 2010 is broken when U.S. college teams Michigan State and Michigan meet in Michigan's American football venue of Michigan Stadium in an event billed as The Big Chill at the Big House. The announced crowd for the 5–0 Michigan win was 113,411 (based on tickets sold), which would have been the largest in the stadium's history to date (including football), but the actual number of ticket holders who entered the stadium was 104,173. The lower number was still sufficient for a new record.
- December 26 (2010)–January 5: 2011 World Junior Ice Hockey Championships in Buffalo, United States.
  - (gold) Russia (silver) Canada (bronze) United States
- January 1: Fourth NHL Winter Classic between the Washington Capitals and Pittsburgh Penguins at Heinz Field in Pittsburgh, Pennsylvania. The Capitals won the game 3–1.
- January 30: 58th National Hockey League All-Star Game was hosted by the Carolina Hurricanes. In a new format, the two teams were stocked in a "fantasy draft" by captains Nicklas Lidström and Eric Staal. Team Lidström defeated Team Staal 11–10, with Team Staal's Patrick Sharp (Chicago Blackhawks) named as game MVP.
- February 20: Second NHL Heritage Classic between the Montreal Canadiens and Calgary Flames at McMahon Stadium in Calgary, Alberta, Canada.
- March 25 – April 9: 2011 NCAA Division I Men's Ice Hockey Tournament.
  - Minnesota-Duluth Bulldogs defeat the Michigan Wolverines 3–2 to win the championship.
- April 16: Salavat Yulaev Ufa wins the Gagarin Cup as champions of the Kontinental Hockey League, defeating Atlant Moscow Oblast 4–1 in the best-of-seven finals.
- April 16: The Clarenville Caribous defeat the Bentley Generals 5–3 to win the 2011 Allan Cup.
- April 29, – May 15, 2011: 2011 IIHF World Championship in Slovakia, with games being played in Bratislava and Košice.
  - (gold) Finland (silver) Sweden (bronze) Czech Republic
- May 8: Pembroke Lumber Kings defeat the Vernon Vipers 2–0 to win the 2011 Royal Bank Cup.
- May 29: Saint John Sea Dogs defeat the Mississauga St. Michael's Majors 3–1 to win the 2011 Memorial Cup.
- May 31: NHL Commissioner Gary Bettman announces that the Atlanta Thrashers have been sold to a Winnipeg-based group and will move to that city. On June 21, the NHL Board of Governors officially approves the move, and three days later the team is unveiled as the new Winnipeg Jets.
- June 15: The Boston Bruins defeat the Vancouver Canucks 4–0 in Game 7 to win the 2011 Stanley Cup Finals. Bruins goaltender Tim Thomas receives the Conn Smythe Trophy as MVP of the Stanley Cup playoffs. Patrice Bergeron becomes the newest member of the Triple Gold Club, adding the Cup to his gold medals with Team Canada in the 2004 World Championships and 2010 Olympics.
- June 24–25: 2011 NHL entry draft in St. Paul, Minnesota.
- September 7: The entire active roster of the Lokomotiv Yaroslavl team is killed in the 2011 Lokomotiv Yaroslavl plane crash.

== Ice sledge hockey ==
- February 12 – February 20 – 2011 IPC Ice Sledge Hockey European Championships in Sollefteå, Sweden

== See also ==
- 2011 in skiing
- 2011 in sports
