= 2014 in ice sports =

== Bandy ==
World Championship

- January 26–2 February XXXIVth Bandy World Championship for men in Irkutsk, Russia – Russia wins.
  - Germany and Somalia make their world championship débuts.
- February 19–22 VIIth Bandy World Championship for women in Lappeenranta, Finland – Russia wins

World Cup

- Final game, 2013 Bandy World Cup, October: Dynamo Moscow (Russia) defeats Dynamo Kazan (Russia), 3–0
- Final game, 2013 Bandy World Cup Women, October 13: Kareby IS (Sweden) defeats Rekord Irkutsk (Russia), 4–3

National championships

- March 1 – Minneapolis Bandolier becomes United States champion for men
- March 15 – (Sweden) AIK becomes Swedish champion for women
- March 15 – (Finland) Oulun Luistinseura becomes Finnish champion for men
- March 16 – (Sweden) Sandvikens AIK becomes Swedish champion for men
- March 17 – (Finland) Sudet becomes Finnish champion for women
- March 30 – (Russia) Yenisey becomes Russian champion for men
- March – (Norway) Nordre Sande IL/Drammen Bandy becomes Norwegian champion for women
- March – (Norway) Stabæk IF becomes Norwegian champion for men
- May 6 – The Gothenburg-based club GAIS decides to withdraw from next season's Swedish top-tier Elitserien in spite of being qualified.

== Bobsleigh and skeleton ==
- November 30, 2013 – January 26, 2014: 2013–14 Bobsleigh World Cup and 2013–14 Skeleton World Cup together
  - Overall two-man bobsleigh winner: (United States) Steven Holcomb / Steven Langton
  - Overall four-man bobsleigh winner: (Germany) Maximilian Arndt / Marko Hübenbecker / Alexander Rödiger / Martin Putze
  - Overall two-women bobsleigh winner: (Canada) Kaillie Humphries / Heather Moyse
  - Overall combined two-man and four-man overall winner: (United States) Steven Holcomb (driver)
  - Overall men's skeleton winner: (Latvia) Martins Dukurs
  - Overall women's skeleton winner: (United Kingdom) Lizzy Yarnold
- February 13 – 15: 2014 Winter Olympics (Skeleton)
  - Men: (gold) (Russia) Aleksandr Tretyakov; (silver) (Latvia) Martins Dukurs; (bronze) (United States) Matthew Antoine
  - Women: (gold) (United Kingdom) Lizzy Yarnold; (silver) (United States) Noelle Pikus-Pace; (bronze) (Russia) Elena Nikitina
- February 16 – 23: 2014 Winter Olympics (Bobsleigh)
  - Two-man: (gold) (Russia) Alexandr Zubkov / Alexey Voyevoda; (silver) (Switzerland) Beat Hefti / Alex Baumann; (bronze) (United States) Steven Holcomb / Steven Langton
  - Four-man: (gold) Russia; (silver) Latvia; (bronze) United States
  - Two-women: (gold) (Canada) Kaillie Humphries / Heather Moyse; (silver) (United States) Elana Meyers / Lauryn Williams; (bronze) (United States) Jamie Greubel / Aja Evans

== Curling ==
- 2013 Curlers Corner Autumn Gold Curling Classic (Calgary, Alberta, October 11–14)
  - Winner: (Scotland) Eve Muirhead (skip)
- 2013 Manitoba Liquor & Lotteries Women's Classic (Winnipeg, Manitoba, October 25–28)
  - Winner: (Manitoba) Jennifer Jones (skip)
- 2013 The Masters Grand Slam of Curling (Abbotsford, British Columbia, October 29–November 3)
  - Men's winner: (Ontario) Glenn Howard (skip)
  - Women's winner: (Ontario) Rachel Homan (skip)
- 2013 Canadian Open of Curling (Medicine Hat, Alberta, November 13–17)
  - Winner: (Alberta) Kevin Koe (skip)
- 2013 Colonial Square Ladies Classic (Saskatoon, Saskatchewan, November 15–18)
  - Winner: (Manitoba) Jennifer Jones (skip)
- 2013 Canadian Olympic Curling Trials (Winnipeg, Manitoba, December 1–8)
  - Men's winner: (Ontario) Brad Jacobs (skip)
  - Women's winner: (Manitoba) Jennifer Jones (skip)
- January 16 – 19: 2014 Continental Cup of Curling in (United States) Paradise
  - Team North America ( (Canada) / (United States) ) defeated Team World 36–24.
- February 10 – 21: 2014 Winter Olympics (Men) and (Women)
  - Men: (gold) Canada; (silver) Great Britain; (bronze) Sweden
  - Women: (gold) Canada; (silver) Sweden; (bronze) Great Britain
- February 26 – March 5: 2014 World Junior Curling Championships in (Switzerland) Flims
  - Men's winner: (Switzerland) Yannick Schwaller (skip)
  - Women's winner: (Canada) Kelsey Rocque (skip)
- 2014 The National (Fort McMurray, Alberta, March 12–16)
- March 15 – 23: 2014 Ford World Women's Curling Championship in (Canada) Saint John, New Brunswick
  - Winner: (Switzerland) Binia Feltscher (skip)
- March 29 – April 6: 2014 World Men's Curling Championship in (China) Beijing
  - Winner: (Norway) Thomas Ulsrud (skip)
- 2014 Players' Championship (Summerside, Prince Edward Island, April 15–20)
- April 23 – 30: 2014 World Mixed Doubles Curling Championship and 2014 World Senior Curling Championships together in (Scotland) Dumfries
  - Mixed doubles winners: (Switzerland) Michelle and Reto Gribi
  - Men's seniors winner: (Canada) Wayne Tallon (skip)
  - Women's seniors winner: (Scotland) Christine Cannon (skip)

== Figure skating ==
- October 18 – November 24, 2013: 2013–14 ISU Grand Prix of Figure Skating
  - Russia won both the gold and overall medal tallies.
- December 5 – 8, 2013: 2013–14 Grand Prix of Figure Skating Final at (Japan) Fukuoka
- Senior
  - Men: (Japan) Yuzuru Hanyu
  - Ladies: (Japan) Mao Asada
  - Pairs: (Germany) Aliona Savchenko / Robin Szolkowy
  - Ice dance: (United States) Meryl Davis / Charlie White
- Junior
  - Men: (China) Jin Boyang
  - Ladies: (Russia) Maria Sotskova
  - Pairs: (China) Yu Xiaoyu / Jin Yang
  - Ice dance: (Russia) Anna Yanovskaya / Sergey Mozgov
- January 13 – 19: 2014 European Figure Skating Championships at (Hungary) Budapest
  - Men: (Spain) Javier Fernández
  - Ladies: (Russia) Yulia Lipnitskaya
  - Pairs: (Russia) Tatiana Volosozhar / Maxim Trankov
  - Ice dance: (Italy) Anna Cappellini / Luca Lanotte
- January 20 – 26: 2014 Four Continents Figure Skating Championships at (Chinese Taipei) Taipei
  - Men: (Japan) Takahito Mura
  - Ladies: (Japan) Kanako Murakami
  - Pairs: (China) Sui Wenjing / Han Cong
  - Ice dance: (United States) Madison Hubbell / Zachary Donohue
- February 6 – 22: 2014 Winter Olympics
  - Men: (Japan) Yuzuru Hanyu
  - Ladies: (Russia) Adelina Sotnikova
  - Pairs: (Russia) Tatiana Volosozhar / Maxim Trankov
  - Ice Dance: (United States) Meryl Davis / Charlie White
  - Team: (gold) Russia; (silver) Canada; (bronze) United States
- March 10 – 16: 2014 World Junior Figure Skating Championships at (Bulgaria) Sofia
  - Men: (Canada) Nam Nguyen
  - Ladies: (Russia) Elena Radionova
  - Pairs: (China) Yu Xiaoyu / Jin Yang
  - Ice dance: (United States) Kaitlin Hawayek / Jean-Luc Baker
- March 24 – 30: 2014 World Figure Skating Championships at (Japan) Saitama
  - Men: (Japan) Yuzuru Hanyu
  - Ladies: (Japan) Mao Asada
  - Pairs: (Germany) Aliona Savchenko / Robin Szolkowy
  - Ice Dance: (Italy) Anna Cappellini / Luca Lanotte

== Ice hockey ==
- September 4, 2013 – March 3, 2014: 2013–14 KHL season
  - KHL Continental Cup winner: (Russia) Dynamo Moscow
  - (Russia) Sergei Mozyakin, of the (Russia) Metallurg Magnitogorsk team, was the top scorer for this season.
    - March 7 – April 30: 2014 Gagarin Cup playoffs
      - Champions: (Russia) Metallurg Magnitogorsk (first KHL title)
    - March 7 – April 6: 2014 Nadezhda Cup
      - Champions: (Russia) Avangard Omsk
- October 1, 2013 – April 13, 2014: 2013–14 NHL season
  - Presidents' Trophy and Eastern Conference regular season winner: (Massachusetts) Boston Bruins
  - Western Conference regular season winner: (California) Anaheim Ducks
  - (Nova Scotia) Sidney Crosby, of the (Pennsylvania) Pittsburgh Penguins, was the top scorer for this season.
    - April 16 – June 13: 2014 Stanley Cup playoffs
      - The (California) Los Angeles Kings defeated the (New York (state)) New York Rangers, 4–1 (in games won), to claim its second NHL title.
      - 2014 Conn Smythe Trophy winner: (Ontario) Justin Williams (Los Angeles Kings)
- December 26, 2013 – January 5, 2014: 2014 World Junior Ice Hockey Championships in Malmö
  - Finland defeated Sweden 3–2, in overtime, to claim its third title. Russia claimed the bronze medal.
- January 1: 2014 NHL Winter Classic (Toronto vs. Detroit) at Michigan Stadium in Ann Arbor
  - (Ontario) The Toronto Maple Leafs defeated the (Michigan) Detroit Red Wings 3–2 in a shootout.
- January 11: 2014 KHL All-Star Game at the Ondrej Nepela Arena in (Slovakia) Bratislava
  - Team West defeated Team East 18–16.
- January 25 – March 1: 2014 NHL Stadium Series (debut)
  - January 25: Anaheim Ducks versus the Los Angeles Kings at Dodger Stadium
    - Anaheim Ducks defeated the Los Angeles Kings 3–0.
  - January 26: New Jersey Devils versus the New York Rangers at Yankee Stadium
    - New York Rangers defeated the New Jersey Devils 7–3.
  - January 29: New York Islanders versus the New York Rangers at Yankee Stadium
    - New York Rangers defeated the New York Islanders 2–1.
  - March 1: Pittsburgh Penguins versus the Chicago Blackhawks at Soldier Field
    - Chicago Blackhawks defeated the Pittsburgh Penguins 5–1.
- February 8 – 20: 2014 Winter Olympics (Women)
  - (gold) Canada; (silver) United States; (bronze) Switzerland. Canada defeated the United States, 3–2, in overtime, to claim its fourth consecutive Olympic women's ice hockey gold medal.
- February 12 – 23: 2014 Winter Olympics (Men)
  - (gold) Canada; (silver) Sweden; (bronze) Finland. Canada defeated Sweden, with the score of 3–0, to claim its ninth Olympic title.
- March 2: 2014 Heritage Classic (NHL) (Ottawa vs. Vancouver) at BC Place
  - (Ontario) Ottawa Senators defeated the (British Columbia) Vancouver Canucks 4–2.
- March 14 – 23: 2014 NCAA National Collegiate Women's Ice Hockey Tournament (Frozen Four at TD Bank Sports Center in Hamden, Connecticut)
  - The (New York (state)) Clarkson Golden Knights defeated the Minnesota Golden Gophers 5–4 to win their first NCAA title. It was also the first top-level NCAA women's title won by a school from outside the Western Collegiate Hockey Association, which had claimed all 13 previous titles.
- March 23 – 30: 2014 IIHF World Women's U18 Championship at (Hungary) Budapest
  - Canada defeated the United States, 5–1, to claim its fourth title. The Czech Republic claimed the bronze medal.
- March 28 – April 12: 2014 NCAA Division I Men's Ice Hockey Tournament (Frozen Four at Wells Fargo Center in Philadelphia)
  - The (New York (state)) Union Dutchmen defeated the Minnesota Golden Gophers 7–4 to claim their first NCAA title.
- April 14 – 19: 2014 Allan Cup at (Canada) Dundas, Ontario
  - The (Ontario) Dundas Real McCoys defeated the (Newfoundland and Labrador) Clarenville Caribous, 3–2, to win their first title.
- April 17 – 27: 2014 IIHF World U18 Championships at (Finland) Lappeenranta and Imatra
  - The United States defeated the Czech Republic, 5–2, to claim its eighth title. Canada took the bronze medal.
- May 9 – 25: 2014 IIHF World Championship in (Belarus) Minsk
  - Russia defeated Finland, 5–2, to claim its fifth title. Sweden took the bronze medal.
- May 16 – 25: 2014 Memorial Cup at (Canada) London, Ontario
  - The (Alberta) Edmonton Oil Kings defeated the (Ontario) Guelph Storm in the final, 6–3, to win their first title since 1966.

== Luge ==
- November 16, 2013 – January 26, 2014: 2013–14 Luge World Cup
  - Men's singles overall winner: (Germany) Felix Loch
  - Men's doubles overall winner: (Germany) Tobias Wendl / Tobias Arlt
  - Women's singles overall winner: (Germany) Natalie Geisenberger
  - Team Relay overall winner: Germany
- February 8 – 13: 2014 Winter Olympics
  - Men's singles: (gold) (Germany) Felix Loch; (silver) (Russia) Albert Demchenko; (bronze) (Italy) Armin Zöggeler
  - Women's singles: (gold) (Germany) Natalie Geisenberger; (silver) (Germany) Tatjana Hüfner; (bronze) (United States) Erin Hamlin
  - Men's doubles: (gold) (Germany) Tobias Arlt/Tobias Wendl; (silver) (Austria) Andreas Linger/Wolfgang Linger; (bronze) (Latvia) Andris Šics/Juris Šics
  - Team relay: (gold) Germany; (silver) Russia; (bronze) Latvia

== Speed skating ==
=== Long track ===
- November 8, 2013 – March 16, 2014: 2013–14 ISU Speed Skating World Cup
  - November 8 – 10, 2013, in (Canada) Calgary
    - Netherlands won both the gold and overall medal tallies.
  - November 15 – 17, 2013, in Salt Lake City
    - Netherlands won the gold medal tally. Netherlands and the United States were tied in the overall medal tally.
  - November 29 – December 1, 2013, in (Kazakhstan) Astana
    - United States won the gold medal tally. Russia won the overall medal tally.
  - December 6 – 8, 2013, in (Germany) Berlin
    - Netherlands won both the gold and overall medal tallies.
  - March 7 – 9, 2014, in (Germany) Inzell
    - Netherlands won both the gold and overall medal tallies.
  - March 14 – 16, 2014, in Heerenveen
    - Netherlands won both the gold and overall medal tallies.
- January 11 – 12: 2014 Essent ISU European Speed Skating Championships at (Norway) Hamar
  - Netherlands won both the gold and overall medal tallies.
- January 18 – 19: 2014 World Sprint Speed Skating Championships in (Japan) Nagano
  - Men's overall winner: (Netherlands) Michel Mulder
  - Women's overall winner: (China) Yu Jing
- February 8 – 22: 2014 Winter Olympics
  - Netherlands won both the gold and overall medal tallies.
- March 7 – 9: 2014 World Junior Speed Skating Championships at (Norway) Bjugn
  - Netherlands won both the gold and overall medal tallies.
- March 21 – 23: 2014 World Allround Speed Skating Championships in (Netherlands) Heerenveen
  - Men's winner: (Netherlands) Koen Verweij
  - Women's winner: (Netherlands) Ireen Wüst

=== Short track ===
- September 26 – November 17, 2013: 2013–14 ISU Short Track Speed Skating World Cup
  - September 28 & 29 at (China) Shanghai
    - South Korea won both the gold and overall medal tallies.
  - October 5 & 6 at Seoul
    - South Korea won both the gold and overall medal tallies.
  - November 7 – 10 at (Italy) Turin
    - South Korea won both the gold and overall medal tallies.
  - November 14 – 17 at (Russia) Kolomna
    - China won the gold medal tally. China and South Korea share the overall medal tally.
- January 17 – 19: 2014 European Short Track Speed Skating Championships at (Germany) Dresden
  - Men's overall winner: (Russia) Viktor Ahn
  - Women's overall winner: (Netherlands) Jorien ter Mors
- February 10 – 21: 2014 Winter Olympics
  - Russia won the gold medal tally. China won the overall medal tally.
- March 7 – 9: 2014 World Junior Short Track Speed Skating Championships at (Turkey) Erzurum
  - South Korea won both the gold and overall medal tallies.
- March 14 – 16: 2014 World Short Track Speed Skating Championships in (Canada) Montreal
  - South Korea won both the gold and overall medal tallies.
