= 2012 in ice sports =

== Bandy ==
=== World Championship ===
- January 27 – February 3: 2012 Bandy World Championship in Almaty
  - Division A final: Sweden defeated Russia, 5–4, to win its eleventh Bandy World Championship title. Kazakhstan took the bronze medal.
  - Division B final: Belarus won the division and was therefore qualified for Division A next year.

=== Women's World Championship ===
- February 23–26: 2012 Women's Bandy World Championship in Irkutsk
  - Final: Sweden defeated Russia, 5–3, to win its sixth Bandy World Championship title for women. Finland took the bronze medal.

=== World Cup ===
- Final game, 2011 Bandy World Cup, October: Yenisey Krasnoyarsk (Russia) defeated Sandvikens AIK (Sweden), 4–3

=== National champions ===
- Finland: Mikkelin Kampparit (men), Veiterä (women)
- Norway: Stabæk IF (men), Drammen Bandy (women)
- Russia: Dynamo Moscow (men)
- Sweden: Sandvikens AIK (men), AIK (women)
- Ukraine: Azot Severodonetsk (men)
- United States: Minneapolis Bandolier (men)

=== International Youth Championships ===
- U15 World Championship
  - Winner: Russia
- U19 World Championship
  - Winner: Russia

== Curling ==
Season of Champions

- Canada Cup of Curling (Cranbrook, British Columbia, Nov. 30 – Dec. 4)
  - Men's winner: (Alberta) Kevin Martin def. (Ontario) Glenn Howard
  - Women's winner: (Manitoba) Jennifer Jones def. (Manitoba) Chelsea Carey
- Continental Cup of Curling (Langley, British Columbia, January 12–15)
  - Winner: (United Nations) Team World
- M&M Meat Shops Canadian Junior Curling Championships (Napanee, Ontario, February 4–12)
  - Men's winner: (Alberta) Brendan Bottcher (skip)
  - Women's winner: (Alberta) Jocelyn Peterman (skip)
- Scotties Tournament of Hearts (Red Deer, Alberta, February 18–26)
  - Women's winner: (Alberta) Heather Nedohin (skip)
- Tim Hortons Brier (Saskatoon, Saskatchewan, March 3–11)
  - Men's winner: (Ontario) Glenn Howard (skip)

Grand slams

- Curlers Corner Autumn Gold Curling Classic (Calgary, Alberta, Oct. 7–10)
  - Women's winner: (Manitoba) Cathy Overton-Clapham def. (Alberta) Amy Nixon
- Manitoba Lotteries Women's Curling Classic (Winnipeg, Manitoba, Oct. 21–24)
  - Women's winner: (Alberta) Renée Sonnenberg def. (Alberta) Heather Nedohin
- GP Car and Home World Cup of Curling (Sault Ste. Marie, Ontario, Nov. 2–6)
  - Men's winner: (Ontario) Glenn Howard def. (Ontario) John Epping
- BDO Canadian Open of Curling (Kingston, Ontario, Dec. 14–18)
  - Men's winner: (Manitoba) Mike McEwen def. (Manitoba) Jeff Stoughton
- The Pomeroy Inn & Suites National (Dawson Creek, British Columbia, January 25–29)
  - Men's winner: (Ontario) Glenn Howard (skip)
- Sun Life Financial Players' Championship (Summerside, Prince Edward Island, April 17–22)
  - Men's winner: (Ontario) John Epping (skip)
  - Women's winner: (Saskatchewan) Stefanie Lawton (skip)

World championships

- World Wheelchair Curling Championship (Chuncheon City, South Korea, February 18–25)
  - Winner: Russia (Andrey Smirnov, skip)
- World Junior Curling Championships (Östersund, Sweden, March 3–11)
  - Men's winner: Canada (Brendan Bottcher, skip)
  - Women's winner: Scotland (Hannah Fleming, skip)
- Ford World Women's Curling Championship (Lethbridge, Alberta, March 17–25)
  - Women's winner: Switzerland (Mirjam Ott, skip)
- Capital One World Men's Curling Championship (Basel, Switzerland, March 31 – April 8)
  - Men's winner: Canada (Glenn Howard, skip)
- World Senior Curling Championships (Tårnby. Denmark, April 14–21)
  - Men's winner: Ireland (John Jo Kenny, skip)
  - Women's winner: Canada (Heidi Hanlon, skip)
- World Mixed Doubles Curling Championship (Erzurum, Turkey, April 23–29)
  - Winner: Switzerland

== Figure skating ==
- January 23–29 – 2012 European Figure Skating Championships in Sheffield, England
- February 7–12 – 2012 Four Continents Figure Skating Championships in Colorado Springs, United States
- February 27 – March 4 – 2012 World Junior Figure Skating Championships in Minsk, Belarus
- March 26 – April 1 – 2012 World Figure Skating Championships in Nice, France

== Ice hockey ==
- September 7, 2011: 2011 Lokomotiv Yaroslavl plane crash: A plane carrying KHL team Lokomotiv Yaroslavl crashes, killing all but one player and one flight crew member. The league responds by stopping the season's first game, already in progress, and postponing the official season start.
  - September 12, 2011: On the day that Alexander Galimov, the only Lokomotiv player to survive the crash, dies of his injuries, Lokomotiv announces it will pull out of the KHL for the 2011–12 season. The team will play in the second-level Russian Major League this season and return to the KHL in 2012–13. In other fallout from the crash, the Czech Extraliga announces it will delay the start of its 2011–12 season from September 16 to September 18. The original start date conflicted with the funeral of Jan Marek, one of three Czechs killed in the crash.
- October 6, 2011: Start of the 2011–12 NHL regular season.
- December 26, 2011 – January 5: 2012 World Junior Ice Hockey Championships in Calgary, Alberta and Edmonton, Alberta, Canada
  - Sweden defeated defending-champion Russia 1–0 in overtime to win their first title in 31 years. Russian forward Evgeny Kuznetsov was named MVP of the tournament.
- January 2: The 2012 NHL Winter Classic is held in Philadelphia.
- January 29: The 59th National Hockey League All-Star Game is held in Ottawa.
- February 14: The Detroit Red Wings set a new NHL record for consecutive home wins at 21 straight with a 3–1 win over the Dallas Stars. The previous record of 20 consecutive wins was originally set by the Boston Bruins in 1929–30 and tied by the Philadelphia Flyers in 1975–76. The new record is 23 consecutive home wins.
- March 25: McGill Redmen defeat the Western Ontario Mustangs 4–3 to win the 2012 CIS University Cup.
- March 23 – April 7: 2012 NCAA Men's Division I Ice Hockey Tournament
  - Boston College defeat Ferris State 4–1 to win the 2012 NCAA Division I Men's Ice Hockey Tournament.
- April 3 - May 23: 2012 Kelly Cup playoffs in the ECHL. Florida wins the Kelly Cup over Las Vegas Wranglers 4-1.
- April 7 – 14: 2012 IIHF Women's World Championship in the United States
  - Canada defeated defending-champion United States 5–4 in overtime to win their tenth title overall and the team's first IIHF World title since 2007.
- April 11 – June 11: 2012 Stanley Cup playoffs in Canada and United States.
  - The Los Angeles Kings win its first Stanley Cup, over the New Jersey Devils 4–2 in games played in the 2012 Stanley Cup Final.
- April 16 – 21: 2012 Allan Cup Canadian senior men's ice hockey championship in Lloydminster, Alberta/Saskatchewan.
  - Southeast Prairie Thunder defeat the Rosetown Red Wings 4–1 in the final to win the championship.
- May 5 – 13: 2012 Royal Bank Cup Canadian "Junior A" championship in Humboldt, Saskatchewan.
  - Penticton Vees defeat the Woodstock Slammers 4–3 in the final to win the championship.
- May 4 – 20: 2012 IIHF World Championship in Finland and Sweden.
  - Russia defeated Slovakia 6–2 to win its fourth title.
- May 18 – 27: 2012 Memorial Cup in Shawinigan, Quebec.
  - The Shawinigan Cataractes defeated the London Knights 2–1 in overtime to win the Memorial Cup championship.
- April 19 – June 9: 2012 Calder Cup in Canada and United States.
  - The Norfolk Admirals defeat the Toronto Marlies 6–1 in game four of the Calder Cup final to win the championship.
- June 20: 2012 NHL Awards in Las Vegas.
- June 22–23: 2012 NHL entry draft in Pittsburgh.
- June 27: The 2012 induction class of the Hockey Hall of Fame, consisting entirely of (male) players, is announced. These individuals were formally inducted on November 12 in Toronto.
  - (Russia) Pavel Bure
  - (Canada) Adam Oates
  - (Canada) Joe Sakic
  - (Sweden) Mats Sundin
- September 15: The NHL locks out its players upon the expiration of the collective bargaining agreement between the league and the players' union.

== Luge ==
- 2011–12 Luge World Cup
- FIL World Luge Championships 2012 in Altenberg, Germany
