= 2010 in ice sports =

This articles details major events and champions in 2010 in ice sports. Ice sports include sports such as curling and ice hockey.

== Bandy ==
=== World Championship ===
- January 24 – 31: 2010 Bandy World Championship in Moscow
  - Division A: Sweden defeated Russia, 6–5 (sudden death), to win the Bandy World Championship title. Finland took the bronze medal.
  - Division B: Canada won the preliminary round and played a qualifying match against United States for Division A, but lost 6–9, thus not replacing the USA in Division A next year.

=== February ===
- – Minneapolis Bandolier becomes United States champion for men
- 24th-27th Bandy World Championship for women in Drammen, Norway – Sweden wins

=== March ===
- 20th – (Sweden) AIK becomes Swedish champion for women
- 21st – (Sweden) Hammarby IF becomes Swedish champion for men
- – (Finland) HIFK becomes Finnish champion for men
- – (Finland) Tornion Palloveikot becomes Finnish champion for women
- – (Norway) Solberg SK becomes Norwegian champion for men
- – (Norway) Stabæk IF becomes Norwegian champion for women
- – (Russia) Dynamo Moscow becomes Russian champion for men

== Figure skating ==
- January 18–24 – 2010 European Figure Skating Championships in Tallinn
- January 27–30 – 2010 Four Continents Figure Skating Championships in Jeonju
- February 14–27 – 2010 Winter Olympics in Vancouver
- March 8–14 – 2010 World Junior Figure Skating Championships in The Hague
- March 22–28 – 2010 World Figure Skating Championships in Turin

== Ice hockey ==
- December 26 (2009)–January 5: United States wins gold, Canada wins silver, and Sweden wins bronze at the 2010 World Junior Ice Hockey Championships in Saskatoon and Regina, Canada.
- January 1 : The Boston Bruins defeat the Philadelphia Flyers 2–1 in overtime in the 2010 NHL Winter Classic at Fenway Park in Boston, Massachusetts, United States.
- February 13–25: Canada wins gold, United States wins silver, and Finland wins bronze at the women's tournament of the 2010 Winter Olympics in Vancouver, British Columbia, Canada
- February 16–28: Canada wins gold, United States wins silver, and Finland wins bronze at the men's tournament of the 2010 Winter Olympics in Vancouver, British Columbia, Canada.
  - Team Canada's win makes head coach Mike Babcock the first coach ever to join the Triple Gold Club, consisting of individuals who have won Olympic gold, World Championship gold, and the Stanley Cup. Team Canada player Eric Staal also joins the Triple Gold Club.
- March 27–28: The Minnesota Whitecaps became the first United States based team to win the Clarkson Cup by defeating the Brampton Thunder 4 goals to none.
- March 27 – April 3: Canada wins gold, United States wins silver, and Sweden wins bronze at the 2010 IIHF World Women's U18 Championship in Chicago, Illinois.
- April 13–23: United States wins gold, Sweden wins silver, and Finland wins bronze at the 2010 IIHF World U18 Championships in Minsk and Babruysk, Belarus.
- April 24: The Fort St. John Flyers defeat the Bentley Generals 4–1 to win the 2010 Allan Cup.
- April 27: Ak Bars Kazan defeat HC MVD 2–0 of game 7 to win the Gagarin Cup.
- May 7: The opening game of the 2010 IIHF World Championship, held at the Veltins-Arena football stadium in Gelsenkirchen, sets a new and ultimately short-lived attendance record for the sport as 77,803 watch Germany defeat the United States 2–1.
- May 7–23: Czech Republic wins gold, Russia wins silver, and Sweden wins bronze at the 2010 IIHF World Championship in Cologne, Mannheim and Gelsenkirchen, Germany.
- May 14: The Philadelphia Flyers defeat the Boston Bruins 4–3 in game seven of their Eastern Conference Semi-final series and become the third team in NHL history to win a playoff series after trailing three games to zero. The Flyers also came back from a 3–0 goal deficit in game seven.
- May 23: The Windsor Spitfires defeat the Brandon Wheat Kings 9–1 to win the 2011 Memorial Cup.
- June 9: The Chicago Blackhawks defeat the Philadelphia Flyers 4–3 in overtime of game six of the 2010 Stanley Cup Finals series to win the Stanley Cup for the first time in 49 years. Blackhawks captain Jonathan Toews wins the Conn Smythe Trophy as MVP of the Stanley Cup playoffs and becomes the newest member of the Triple Gold Club.

== See also ==
- 2010 in skiing
- 2010 in sports
