= Rusich Podolsk =

- City: Podolsk, Russia
- League: Pervaya Liga
- Founded: 2009
- Home arena: KSV Vityaz
- Colours: Blue, Black, Red

Rusich Podolsk is an ice hockey team in Podolsk, Russia. They formerly played in the Pervaya Liga, the third level of Russian ice hockey. The club was founded in 2009.

In the 2010-2011 season, playing in the Pervaya Liga, they did not have enough money to pay for using the stadium, and had to default at the first two games of the season. Eventually, the team were disqualified.

Ivan Novoseltsev played for Rusich in 2010, before he retired from competitive ice hockey. Viktor Gordiuk played for Rusich in 2010-2011, also before his retirement.

== See also ==
- HC Rys
