= 2015–16 ISU Speed Skating World Cup – World Cup 6 =

The sixth competition weekend of the 2015–16 ISU Speed Skating World Cup was held in the Thialf arena in Heerenveen, Netherlands, from Friday, 11 March, until Sunday, 13 March 2016.

== Schedule ==
The detailed schedule of events:

Date	Events
Friday, 11 March	16:15: 500 m women (1); 16:32: 500 m men (1); 17:07: 3000 m women 18:13: Team pursuit men 18:28: Team sprint women
Saturday, 12 March	14:00: 500 m women (2); 14:17: 1000 m men 15:05: 1500 m women 15:48: 5000 m men 17:09: Team pursuit women 17:23: Team sprint men
Sunday, 13 March	15:00: 500 m men (2); 15:17: 1000 m women 16:06: 1500 m men 16:49: Mass start women 17:09: Mass start men

All times are CET (UTC+1).

== Medal summary ==
=== Men's events ===
Event	Race #	Gold	Time	Silver	Time	Bronze	Time	Report
500 m	1	Ruslan Murashov; Russia	34.96	Ronald Mulder; Netherlands	35.05	Gilmore Junio; Canada	35.123	
500 m	2	Ronald Mulder; Netherlands	34.81	Ruslan Murashov; Russia	34.89	Mika Poutala; Finland	35.02	
1000 m		Kjeld Nuis; Netherlands	1:08:94	Kai Verbij; Netherlands	1:09:08	Denis Yuskov; Russia	1:09.22	
1500 m		Denis Yuskov; Russia	1:45.39	Sverre Lunde Pedersen; Norway	1:45.46	Bart Swings; Belgium	1:45.65	
5000 m		Sven Kramer; Netherlands	6:11.44	Jorrit Bergsma; Netherlands	6:12.74	Sverre Lunde Pedersen; Norway	6:16.36	
Mass start		Bart Swings; Belgium	68 ^{A}	Fabio Francolini; Italy	40 ^{A}	Arjan Stroetinga; Netherlands	21 ^{A}	
Team pursuit		Netherlands; Jan Blokhuijsen; Douwe de Vries; Arjan Stroetinga	3:42.28	Norway; Håvard Bøkko; Simen Spieler Nilsen; Sverre Lunde Pedersen	3:43.42	Poland; Zbigniew Bródka; Konrad Niedźwiedzki; Jan Szymański	3:47.03	
Team sprint		Netherlands; Ronald Mulder; Kai Verbij; Stefan Groothuis	1:20.40	Canada; Gilmore Junio; Alexandre St-Jean; Vincent De Haître	1:20.41	Russia; Ruslan Murashov; Aleksey Yesin; Kirill Golubev	1:20.86	

^{A} In mass start, race points are accumulated during the race. The skater with most race points is the winner.

=== Women's events ===
Event	Race #	Gold	Time	Silver	Time	Bronze	Time	Report
500 m	1	Brittany Bowe; United States	37.84	Heather Richardson-Bergsma; United States	38.02	Jorien ter Mors; Netherlands	38.20	
500 m	2	Brittany Bowe; United States	37.64	Heather Richardson-Bergsma; United States	37.88	Heather McLean; Canada	38.07	
1000 m		Brittany Bowe; United States	1:14.22	Jorien ter Mors; Netherlands	1:14.44	Heather Richardson-Bergsma; United States	1:15.07	
1500 m		Brittany Bowe; United States	1:54.34	Heather Richardson-Bergsma; United States	1:54.90	Antoinette de Jong; Netherlands	1:56.32	
3000 m		Natalya Voronina; Russia	4:08.15	Jorien Voorhuis; Netherlands	4:08.18	Olga Graf; Russia	4:08.40	
Mass start		Irene Schouten; Netherlands	60 ^{A}	Ivanie Blondin; Canada	40 ^{A}	Miho Takagi; Japan	20 ^{A}	
Team pursuit		Japan; Misaki Oshigiri; Miho Takagi; Nana Takagi	2:58.06	Netherlands; Antoinette de Jong; Marrit Leenstra; Ireen Wüst	2:58.21	Poland; Natalia Czerwonka; Katarzyna Woźniak; Luiza Złotkowska	3:02.34	
Team sprint		China; Li Qishi; Yu Jing; Zhang Hong	1:28.98	Japan; Maki Tsuji; Nao Kodaira; Erina Kamiya	1:29.98	Netherlands; Janine Smit; Bo van der Werff; Margot Boer	1:30.04	

^{A} In mass start, race points are accumulated during the race. The skater with most race points is the winner.
