= 2010–11 in skiing =

From October 23, 2010 to March 20, 2011, the following skiing events took place at various locations around the world.

== Alpine skiing ==
- October 23, 2010 – March 20, 2011 –2011 Alpine Skiing World Cup
  - Men Overall Title: Ivica Kostelić of Croatia
  - Women Overall Title: Maria Riesch of Germany
- January 14 – January 23 – 2011 IPC Alpine Skiing World Championships in Sestriere
- February 7 – February 20 – FIS Alpine World Ski Championships 2011 in Garmisch-Partenkirchen

== Nordic skiing ==
- February 22 – March 6 – FIS Nordic World Ski Championships 2011 in Oslo
- March 29 – April 11 – 2011 IPC Biathlon and Cross-Country Skiing World Championships in Khanty-Mansiysk

== Ski mountaineering ==
- 2011 World Championship of Ski Mountaineering, held in Claut, Italy
