= Baikalskiye Sokoly =

- City: Irkutsk, Russia
- League: Russian Bandy Super League
- Founded: 1923; 103 years ago
- Home arena: Ice Palace Baikal
- Head coach: Konstantin Vladmirovich Savchenko
- Website: https://www.baikal-sokoly.ru/
Home colours	Away colours

Baikalskiye Sokoly (Russian: Байкальские соколы) is a bandy club from Irkutsk, Russia. The team is playing in the Russian Bandy Super League. It was founded in 1923, changing its name several times before becoming Lokomotiv Irkutsk in 1947. Lokomotiv played in the top division of the Soviet bandy championship since 1960. Since 1992 it changed its sponsorship and was renamed as Sibskana Irkutsk. In 2002 the club changed its name once again to Sibskana-Energiya Irkutsk, and got renamed to Baikal-Energiya in 2004, winning most of their glory under that name. Due to financial and sponsorship reasons, in the 2025–26 season, Baikal-Energiya was demoted to the Russian Bandy Supreme League. They won the league that year, and in the 2026/27 season they were renamed to Baikalskiye Sokoly. They now perform in the Russian Bandy Super League, the highest tier of Russian bandy.

In the last game of the regular 2016–17 Russian Bandy Super League season, Baykal-Energiya played against Vodnik Arkhangelsk. The loss would make Vodnik facing a weaker team in the playoffs, therefore the team started to score own goals. Baykal-Energiya joined, apparently for fun. Vodnik won 11-9, with all goals scored being own goals. The two teams faced sanctions from the Russian Bandy Federation. The federation banned coach Igor Gapanovich of Vodnik Arkhangelsk and coach Evgeny Erakhtin of Baykal-Energiya each for 30 months in March 2017, and fined each club 300,000 rubles.

== Current season ==
After an easy season in the Supreme League, they were promoted back to the Super League after both winning the league and topping the tournament table, and being able to pay the participation fee. However, their renewed campaign in the top flight did not get to a good start, as they finished fourth in the Kemerovo (Eastern) division of the Russian Cup, and got out in the group stage.

== Baykal-Energiya-2 and Baikalskye Sokoly's youth team ==
Baykal-Energiya's second team Baykal-Energiya-2 played in the Russian Bandy Supreme League, the second tier of Russian bandy. Baykal-Energiya won the 2025–26 tournament and advanced into the Russian Bandy Super League under a different name, while the youth team stayed. Baikalskiye Sokoly do not have a verified youth squad yet.

== Honours ==
=== Domestic ===
- Russian Bandy Supreme League:

Winners (1): 2025–26

- Russian Bandy Super League:

Runner-ups (1): 2016–17, 2017-18

- Russian Cup:

Winners (1): 2015–16

== See also ==
- Rekord Irkutsk
