= Rekord Irkutsk =

Rekord
- City: Irkutsk, Russia
- Founded: 1986; 40 years ago
- Home arena: Rekord Stadium (capacity: 5,300)

Rekord Irkutsk or DYuSSh Rekord (Russian: «ДЮСШ Рекорд» Иркутск) is a bandy club from Irkutsk, Russia. It was founded in 1986. The club colours are black and blue. Rekord Irkutsk won the Bandy World Cup Women in 2012. It mostly fields youth squads.

== See also ==
- Baykal-Energiya
