= 2015 in ice sports =

== Bandy ==
=== World Championship ===
- March 29 – April 4: 2015 Bandy World Championship in Khabarovsk
  - Russia defeated Sweden, 5–3, to win their 9th Bandy World Championship title. Kazakhstan took the bronze medal.

=== World Cup ===
- October 2014 – (Sweden) Västerås SK wins the World Cup

=== International Youth Championships ===
- 23–25 January 2015: U17 World Championship
  - Winner: Russia
- 23–25 January 2015: U19 European Championship
  - Winner: Sweden
- 25–27 February 2015: G17 World Championship
  - Winner: Sweden

=== National champions ===
- Finland: Mikkelin Kampparit (men), Sudet (women)
- Norway: IF Ready (men), Nordre Sande Idrettslag/Drammen Bandy (women)
- Russia: HK Yenisey (men), Zorky Krasnogorsk (women)
- Sweden: Västerås SK (men), Kareby IS (women)
- Ukraine: Dynamo Kharkiv (men)
- United States: Dinkytown Dukes (men)

== Bobsleigh and skeleton ==
- November 9, 2014 – March 8, 2015: 2014–15 FIBT Calendar

=== FIBT World Cup ===
- December 8, 2014 – February 15, 2015: 2014–15 Bobsleigh World Cup and 2014–15 Skeleton World Cup together
  - December 8–13, 2014: World Cup #1 in (United States) Lake Placid at the Mt. Van Hoevenberg Olympic Bobsled Run
    - Two-men bobsleigh winners: (Germany) Francesco Friedrich / Thorsten Margis
    - Four-men bobsleigh winners: (Germany) Maximilian Arndt, Kevin Korona, Joshua Bluhm, and Ben Heber
    - Two-women bobsleigh winners: (United States) Elana Meyers / Cherrelle Garrett
    - Men's skeleton winner: (Latvia) Martins Dukurs
    - Women's skeleton winner: (United Kingdom) Lizzy Yarnold
  - December 15–21, 2014: World Cup #2 in Calgary at the Canada Olympic Park bobsleigh, luge, and skeleton track
    - Two-men bobsleigh winners: (Latvia) Oskars Melbārdis / Daumants Dreiškens
    - Four-men bobsleigh winners: (Latvia) Oskars Melbārdis, Daumants Dreiškens, Arvis Vilkaste, and Jānis Strenga
    - Two-women bobsleigh winners: (United States) Elana Meyers / Cherrelle Garrett
    - Men's skeleton winner: (Latvia) Martins Dukurs
    - Women's skeleton winner: (Canada) Elisabeth Vathje
  - January 5–11, 2015: World Cup #3 in (Germany) Altenberg at the Altenberg bobsleigh, luge, and skeleton track
    - Two-men bobsleigh winners: (Switzerland) Beat Hefti / Alex Baumann
    - Four-men bobsleigh winners: (Germany) Nico Walther, Andreas Bredau, Marko Hübenbecker, and Christian Poser
    - Two-women bobsleigh winners: (United States) Elana Meyers / Cherrelle Garrett
    - Men's skeleton winner: (Latvia) Martins Dukurs
    - Women's skeleton winner: (Russia) Maria Orlova
  - January 12–18, 2015: World Cup #4 in (Germany) Königsee at the Königssee bobsleigh, luge, and skeleton track
    - Two-men bobsleigh winners: (Switzerland) Beat Hefti / Alex Baumann
    - Four-men bobsleigh winners: (Germany) Maximilian Arndt, Kevin Korona, Alexander Rödiger, and Ben Heber
    - Two-women bobsleigh winners: (Germany) Cathleen Martini / Lisa Marie Buckwitz
    - Men's skeleton winner: (Russia) Aleksandr Tretyakov
    - Women's skeleton winner: (United Kingdom) Lizzy Yarnold
  - January 19–25, 2015: World Cup #5 in (Switzerland) St. Moritz at the St. Moritz-Celerina Olympic Bobrun
    - Two-men bobsleigh winners: (Latvia) Oskars Melbārdis / Daumants Dreiškens
    - Four-men bobsleigh winners: (Latvia) Oskars Melbārdis, Daumants Dreiškens, Arvis Vilkaste, and Jānis Strenga
    - Two-women bobsleigh winners: (Germany) Anja Schneiderheinze-Stöckel / Annika Drazek
    - Men's skeleton winner: (Latvia) Martins Dukurs
    - Women's skeleton winner: (Austria) Janine Flock
  - January 26 – February 1, 2015: World Cup #6 in (France) La Plagne at the La Plagne bobsleigh, luge, and skeleton track
    - Two-men bobsleigh winners: (Germany) Francesco Friedrich / Martin Grothkopp
    - Four-men bobsleigh winners: (Latvia) Oskars Melbārdis / Daumants Dreiškens / Arvis Vilkaste, and Jānis Strenga
    - Two-women bobsleigh winners: (United States) Elana Meyers / Cherrelle Garrett
    - Men's skeleton winner: (Latvia) Martins Dukurs
    - Women's skeleton: Cancelled.
  - February 2–8, 2015: World Cup #7 in (Austria) Igls at the Olympic Sliding Centre Innsbruck
  - Note: extra women's skeleton event created, due to the cancellation of the event in La Plagne.
    - Two-men bobsleigh winners: (Germany) Francesco Friedrich / Thorsten Margis
    - Four-men bobsleigh winners: (Latvia) Oskars Melbārdis / Daumants Dreiškens / Arvis Vilkaste, and Jānis Strenga
    - Two-women bobsleigh winners: (United States) Elana Meyers / Lauryn Williams
    - Men's skeleton winner: (Latvia) Martins Dukurs
    - Women's skeleton winner #1: (United Kingdom) Lizzy Yarnold
    - Women's skeleton winner #2: (United Kingdom) Lizzy Yarnold
  - February 10–15, 2015: World Cup #8 (final) in (Russia) Sochi at the Sliding Center Sanki
    - Two-men bobsleigh winners: (Switzerland) Rico Peter / Simon Friedli
    - Four-men bobsleigh winners: (Latvia) Oskars Melbārdis / Daumants Dreiškens / Arvis Vilkaste, and Jānis Strenga
    - Two-women bobsleigh winners: (United States) Elana Meyers / Cherrelle Garrett
    - Men's skeleton winner: (Russia) Aleksandr Tretyakov
    - Women's skeleton winner: (United Kingdom) Lizzy Yarnold

=== FIBT World championship ===
- February 23 – March 8: FIBT World Championships 2015 in (Germany) Winterberg at the Winterberg bobsleigh, luge, and skeleton track
  - Two-men bobsleigh winners: (Germany) Francesco Friedrich / Thorsten Margis
  - Four-men bobsleigh winners: (Germany) Maximilian Arndt / Alexander Rödiger / Kevin Korona / Ben Heber
  - Two-women bobsleigh winners: (United States) Elana Meyers / Cherrelle Garrett
  - Men's skeleton winner: (Latvia) Martins Dukurs
  - Women's skeleton winner: (United Kingdom) Lizzy Yarnold
  - Mixed Bobsleigh/Skeleton Team winners: (Germany) Axel Jungk / Cathleen Martini & Lisette Thöne / Tina Hermann / Francesco Friedrich & Martin Grothkopp

== Curling ==
=== World Curling Tour ===
- August 22, 2014 – April 18, 2015: 2014–15 World Curling Tour

=== CCA events ===
- November 8, 2014 – May 2, 2015: 2014–15 CCA events
  - December 3 – 7, 2014: 2014 Canada Cup of Curling in (Alberta) Camrose
    - Men's winner: (Manitoba) Mike McEwen (skip)
    - Women's winner: (Alberta) Valerie Sweeting (skip)
  - January 8 – 11: 2015 Continental Cup of Curling in (Alberta) Calgary
    - Team Canada defeated (European Union) Team Europe 42–18.
  - January 24 – February 1: 2015 Canadian Junior Curling Championships in (Newfoundland and Labrador) Corner Brook
    - Men's winner: (Manitoba) Braden Calvert (skip)
    - Women's winner: (Alberta) Kelsey Rocque (skip)
  - February 14 – 22: 2015 Scotties Tournament of Hearts in (Saskatchewan) Moose Jaw
    - Manitoba (Skip: Jennifer Jones) defeated Alberta (Skip: Valerie Sweeting), 6–5, to win her fifth Scotties Tournament of Hearts title. Team Canada (Skip: (Ontario) Rachel Homan) won the bronze medal.
  - February 28 – March 8: 2015 Tim Hortons Brier in Calgary
    - Team Canada (Skip: Pat Simmons) defeated Northern Ontario (Skip: Brad Jacobs), 6–5, to defend their Brier title. However, this was the first time there was a Team Canada squad. Also, Alberta won 27 Brier titles in its history. Saskatchewan (Skip: Steve Laycock) took the bronze medal.

=== Curling Grand Slam ===
==== Men's and women's events ====
- October 28 – November 2, 2014: 2014 The Masters Grand Slam of Curling in (Manitoba) Selkirk
  - Men's winner: (Newfoundland and Labrador) Brad Gushue (skip)
  - Women's winner: (Alberta) Valerie Sweeting (skip)
- December 9 – 14, 2014: 2014 Canadian Open of Curling in (Saskatchewan) Yorkton
  - Men's winner: (Newfoundland and Labrador) Brad Gushue (skip)
  - Women's winner: (Scotland) Eve Muirhead (skip)
- April 7 – 12: 2015 Players' Championship in (Ontario) Toronto
  - Men's winner: (Northern Ontario) Brad Jacobs (skip)
  - Women's winner: (Scotland) Eve Muirhead (skip)

==== Men's only events ====
- November 19 – 23, 2014: 2014 The National (November) in (Ontario) Sault Ste. Marie
  - (Manitoba) Mike McEwen (skip) defeated (Ontario) Brad Jacobs (skip), 5–2, to win his first National title.
- March 19 – 22: 2015 Elite 10 in (Alberta) Fort McMurray (debut event)
  - (Manitoba) Mike McEwen (skip) defeated (Sweden) Niklas Edin (skip), 4–2, to win the inaugural Elite 10 title.

==== Women's only events ====
- October 10 – 13: 2014 Curlers Corner Autumn Gold Curling Classic in (Alberta) Calgary
  - (Manitoba) Jennifer Jones defeated (Ontario) Rachel Homan, 6–5, to win her third Autumn Gold Curling Classic title.
- November 7 – 10: 2014 Colonial Square Ladies Classic in (Saskatchewan) Saskatoon
  - (Scotland) Team Muirhead defeated (Ontario) Team Middaugh, 5–4, to win their first Colonial Square Ladies Classic title.

=== Regional curling events ===
- September 13 – 20, 2014: 2014 European Mixed Curling Championship in (Denmark) Tårnby
  - Sweden (Skip: Patric Mabergs) defeated Norway (Skip: Steffen Walstad), 9–2, to claim its first European Mixed Curling Championship title. Switzerland (Skip: Silvana Tirinzoni) took the bronze medal.
- November 8 – 16, 2014: 2014 Pacific-Asia Curling Championships in Karuizawa
  - Men: China (Skip: Zang Jialiang) defeated Japan (Skip: Yusuke Morozumi), 7–5, to win China's eighth consecutive Pacific-Asia Curling Championships title. South Korea (Skip: Kim Soo-hyuk) took the bronze medal.
  - Women: China (Skip: Liu Sijia) defeated South Korea (Skip: Kim Eun-jung), 7–6, to win China's seventh Pacific-Asia Curling Championships title. Japan (Skip: Ayumi Ogasawara) took the bronze medal.
- November 22 – 29, 2014: 2014 European Curling Championships in Champéry
  - Men: Sweden (Skip: Niklas Edin) defeated Norway (Skip: Thomas Ulsrud), 5–4, to win Sweden's seventh men's European Curling Championships title. Switzerland (Skip: Sven Michel) took the bronze medal.
  - Women: Switzerland (Skip: Binia Feltscher) defeated Russia (Skip: Anna Sidorova), 8–7, to win Switzerland's sixth women's European Curling Championships title. Scotland (Skip: Eve Muirhead) took the bronze medal.
- January 3 – 9: 2015 European Junior Curling Challenge in (Czech Republic) Prague
  - Men: Russia (Skip: Artur Ali) defeated Spain (Skip: Sergio Vez Labrador), 4–3, to give Russia its first Men's European Junior Curling Challenge title. Turkey (Skip: Enes Taskesen) took the bronze medal.
  - Women: England (Skip: Hetty Garnier) defeated Turkey (Skip: Dilşat Yıldız), 9–1, to give England its first Women's European Junior Curling Challenge title. Hungary (Skip: Dorottya Palansca) took the bronze medal.
- January 17 – 24: 2015 Pacific-Asia Junior Curling Championships in (New Zealand) Naseby
  - Men: South Korea (Skip: Ki Jeong-lee) defeated China (Skip: Wang Jinbo), 5–4, to win its second men's Pacific-Asia Junior Curling Championship title.
  - Women: South Korea (Skip: Eun Bi-kim) defeated China (Skip: Jiang Yilun), 5–4, to win its second consecutive women's Pacific-Asia Junior Curling Championship title.

=== World curling championships ===
- February 7 – 13: 2015 World Wheelchair Curling Championship in Lohja
  - Russia (Skip: Andrey Smirnov) defeated China (Skip: Wang Haitao), 7–4, to win their second World Wheelchair Curling Championship title. Finland (Skip: Markku Karjalainen) won the bronze medal.
- February 28 – March 8: 2015 World Junior Curling Championships in (Estonia) Tallinn
  - Men: Canada (Skip: (Manitoba) Braden Calvert) defeated Switzerland (Skip: Yannick Schwaller), 6–3, to win Canada's 18th World Junior Curling Championships title. Scotland (Skip: Bruce Mouat) took the bronze medal.
  - Women: Canada (Skip: (Alberta) Kelsey Rocque) defeated Scotland (Skip: Gina Aitken), 8–2, to win Canada's 10th World Junior Curling Championships women's title. Switzerland (Skip: Lisa Gisler) took the bronze medal.
- March 14 – 22: 2015 World Women's Curling Championship in (Japan) Sapporo
  - Switzerland (Skip: Alina Pätz) defeated Canada (Skip: Jennifer Jones), 5–3, to win Switzerland's fifth World Women's Curling Championship title. Russia (Skip: Anna Sidorova) won the bronze medal.
- March 28 – April 5: 2015 Ford World Men's Curling Championship in Halifax
  - Sweden (Skip: Niklas Edin) defeated Norway (Skip: Thomas Ulsrud), 9–5, to claim the country's seventh World Men's Curling Championship title. Canada (Skip: Pat Simmons) took the bronze medal.
- April 18 – 25: 2015 World Mixed Doubles Curling Championship and the 2015 World Senior Curling Championships in (Russia) Sochi
  - Men's Seniors: The United States (Skip: Lyle Sieg) defeated Canada (Skip: Alan O'Leary), 9–4, to win the USA's third Men's Seniors title. New Zealand (Skip: Hans Frauenlob) won the bronze medal.
  - Women's Seniors: Canada (Skip: Lois Fowler) defeated Italy (Skip: Fiona Grace Simpson), 6–2, to win Canada's tenth Women's Seniors title. The United States (Skip: Norma O'Leary) won the bronze medal.
  - Mixed Doubles: Dorottya Palancsa / Zsolt Kiss defeated (Sweden) Camilla Johansson / Per Noréen, 6–5, to win Hungary's second Mixed Doubles title. (Norway) Kristin Skaslien / Magnus Nedregotten won the bronze medal.

== Figure skating ==
=== Senior Grand Prix ===
- October 24 – December 14: 2014–15 ISU Grand Prix of Figure Skating
  - October 24 – 26: 2014 Skate America in (United States) Hoffman Estates, Illinois
    - Men: (Japan) Tatsuki Machida
    - Ladies: (Russia) Elena Radionova
    - Pairs: (Russia) Yuko Kavaguti / Alexander Smirnov
    - Ice dance: (United States) Madison Chock / Evan Bates
  - October 31 – November 2: 2014 Skate Canada International in Kelowna
    - Men: (Japan) Takahito Mura
    - Ladies: (Russia) Anna Pogorilaya
    - Pairs: (Canada) Meagan Duhamel / Eric Radford
    - Ice dance: (Canada) Kaitlyn Weaver / Andrew Poje
  - November 7 – 9: 2014 Cup of China in Shanghai
    - Men: (Russia) Maxim Kovtun
    - Ladies: (Russia) Elizaveta Tuktamysheva
    - Pairs: (China) Peng Cheng / Zhang Hao
    - Ice dance: (France) Gabriella Papadakis / Guillaume Cizeron
  - November 14 – 16: 2014 Rostelecom Cup in (Russia) Moscow
    - Men: (Spain) Javier Fernández
    - Ladies: (Japan) Rika Hongo
    - Pairs: (Russia) Ksenia Stolbova / Fedor Klimov
    - Ice dance: (United States) Madison Chock / Evan Bates
  - November 21 – 23: 2014 Trophée Éric Bompard in (France) Bordeaux
    - Men: (Russia) Maxim Kovtun
    - Ladies: (Russia) Elena Radionova
    - Pairs: (Russia) Ksenia Stolbova / Fedor Klimov
    - Ice dance: (France) Gabriella Papadakis / Guillaume Cizeron
  - November 28 – 30: 2014 NHK Trophy in (Japan) Osaka
    - Men: (Japan) Daisuke Murakami
    - Ladies: (United States) Gracie Gold
    - Pairs: (Canada) Meagan Duhamel / Eric Radford
    - Ice dance: (Canada) Kaitlyn Weaver / Andrew Poje
  - December 11 – 14: 2014–15 Grand Prix of Figure Skating Final in (Spain) Barcelona
    - Men: (Japan) Yuzuru Hanyu
    - Ladies: (Russia) Elizaveta Tuktamysheva
    - Pairs: (Canada) Meagan Duhamel / Eric Radford
    - Ice dance: (Canada) Kaitlyn Weaver / Andrew Poje

=== Junior Grand Prix ===
- August 20, 2014 – December 14, 2014: 2014–15 ISU Junior Grand Prix
  - August 20 – 24 in (France) Courchevel
    - Men's winner: (South Korea) Lee June-hyoung
    - Ladies' winner: (Russia) Evgenia Medvedeva
    - Ice dance winners: (Russia) Alla Loboda / Pavel Drozd
    - Note: No pairs event for this Grand Prix #1
  - August 27 – 31 in (Slovenia) Ljubljana
    - Men's winner: (China) JIN Boyang
    - Ladies' winner: (Russia) Serafima Sakhanovich
    - Ice dance winners: (Russia) Daria Morozova / Mikhail Zhirnov
    - Note: Like GP#1, there was no pairs competition in this Grand Prix #2
  - September 3 – 7 in (Czech Republic) Ostrava
    - Men's winner: (Canada) Roman Sadovsky
    - Ladies' winner: (Russia) Evgenia Medvedeva
    - Pairs winners: (Canada) Julianne Séguin / Charlie Bilodeau
    - Ice dance winners: (Canada) Mackenzie Bent / Garrett MacKeen
  - September 10 – 14 in (Japan) Nagoya, Aichi Prefecture
    - Men's winner: (China) JIN Boyang
    - Ladies' winner: (Russia) Serafima Sakhanovich
    - Ice dance winners: (Canada) Madeline Edwards / PANG Zhaokai
    - Note: Again, no pairs competition was contested in this Grand Prix #4
  - September 24 – 28 in (Estonia) Tallinn
    - Men's winner: (Russia) Alexander Petrov
    - Ladies' winner: (Japan) Miyu Nakashio
    - Pairs winners: (Russia) Maria Vigalova / Egor Zakroev
    - Ice dance winners: (Russia) Anna Yanovskaya / Sergey Mozgov
  - October 1 – 5 in (Germany) Dresden
    - Men's winner: (Russia) Andrei Lazukin
    - Ladies' winner: (Japan) Wakaba Higuchi
    - Pairs winners: (Canada) Julianne Séguin / Charlie Bilodeau
    - Ice dance winners: (Russia) Betina Popova / Yuri Vlasenko
  - October 8 – 12 in (Croatia) Zagreb
    - Men's winner: (Japan) Shoma Uno
    - Ladies' winner: (Russia) Maria Sotskova
    - Pairs winners: (Russia) Maria Vigalova / Egor Zakroev
    - Ice dance winners: (Russia) Anna Yanovskaya / Sergey Mozgov
  - December 11 – 14 in (Spain) Barcelona (final and part of the Grand Prix Final)
    - Men's winner: (Japan) Shoma Uno
    - Ladies' winner: (Russia) Evgenia Medvedeva
    - Pairs winners: (Canada) Julianne Séguin / Charlie Bilodeau
    - Ice dance winners: (Russia) Anna Yanovskaya / Sergey Mozgov

=== World and regional FS championships ===
- January 26 – February 1: 2015 European Figure Skating Championships in (Sweden) Stockholm
  - Men's winner: (Spain) Javier Fernández
  - Ladies winner: (Russia) Elizaveta Tuktamysheva
  - Pairs winners: (Russia) Yuko Kavaguti / Alexander Smirnov
  - Ice Dance winners: (France) Gabriella Papadakis / Guillaume Cizeron
- February 9 – 15: 2015 Four Continents Figure Skating Championships in (South Korea) Seoul
  - Men's winner: (Kazakhstan) Denis Ten
  - Ladies winner: (United States) Polina Edmunds
  - Pairs winners: (Canada) Meagan Duhamel / Eric Radford
  - Ice Dance winners: (Canada) Kaitlyn Weaver / Andrew Poje
- March 2 – 8: 2015 World Junior Figure Skating Championships in (Estonia) Tallinn
  - Men's winner: (Japan) Shoma Uno
  - Ladies winner: (Russia) Evgenia Medvedeva
  - Pairs winners: (China) Yu Xiaoyu / Jin Yang
  - Ice Dance winners: (Russia) Anna Yanovskaya / Sergey Mozgov
- March 23 – 29: 2015 World Figure Skating Championships in (China) Shanghai
  - Men's winner: (Spain) Javier Fernández
  - Ladies winner: (Russia) Elizaveta Tuktamysheva
  - Pairs winners: (Canada) Meagan Duhamel / Eric Radford
  - Ice Dance winners: (France) Gabriella Papadakis / Guillaume Cizeron
- April 16 – 19: 2015 ISU World Team Trophy in Figure Skating in (Japan) Tokyo
  - Winners: United States (Max Aaron, Jason Brown, Gracie Gold, Ashley Wagner, Alexa Scimeca/Chris Knierim, Madison Chock/Evan Bates)

== Ice hockey ==
=== National Hockey League ===
- October 8, 2014 – April 11, 2015: 2014–15 NHL season
  - Presidents' Trophy team winners: (New York (state)) New York Rangers
  - Art Ross Trophy (top scorer) winner: (British Columbia) Jamie Benn (Texas) Dallas Stars
  - Hart Memorial Trophy (season MVP) winner: (British Columbia) Carey Price (Quebec) Montreal Canadiens
- January 1: 2015 NHL Winter Classic at Nationals Park in (United States) Washington, D.C.
  - The (Washington, D.C.) Washington Capitals defeated the (Illinois) Chicago Blackhawks 3–2.
- January 25: 60th National Hockey League All-Star Game at Nationwide Arena in (United States) Columbus, Ohio
  - Team Toews defeated Team Foligno, 17–12, in the highest-scoring All-Star Game in history. The MVP of this All-Star Game was (Canada) Ryan Johansen, of the (Ohio) Columbus Blue Jackets.
- February 21: 2015 NHL Stadium Series at Levi's Stadium in (United States) Santa Clara, California
  - The Los Angeles Kings defeated the San Jose Sharks 2–1.
- April 15 – June 15: 2015 Stanley Cup playoffs
  - The (Illinois) Chicago Blackhawks defeated the (Florida) Tampa Bay Lightning, 4–2 in games played, to win their sixth Stanley Cup title.
- June 26 & 27: 2015 NHL entry draft at the BB&T Center in (Florida) Sunrise
  - #1 pick: (Ontario) Connor McDavid (to the (Alberta) Edmonton Oilers from the (Pennsylvania) Erie Otters)

=== Kontinental Hockey League ===
- September 3, 2014 – February 24, 2015: 2014–15 KHL season
  - Continental Cup winner: (Russia) HC CSKA Moscow
  - KHL Regular Season Top Scorer: (Russia) Alexander Radulov (HC CSKA Moscow)
- January 25: 2015 Kontinental Hockey League All-Star Game at the Bolshoy Ice Dome in (Russia) Sochi
  - Team East (Coach: (Canada) Mike Keenan) defeated Team West (Coach: (Russia) Dmitri Kvartalnov), 18–16.
- February 27 – April 19: 2015 Gagarin Cup playoffs
  - (Russia) SKA Saint Petersburg defeated the (Russia) Ak Bars Kazan, 4–1 in matches played, to win their first Gagarin Cup title.

=== Other ice hockey championships ===
- December 26 – 31, 2014: 2014 Spengler Cup in (Switzerland) Davos
  - The (Switzerland) Genève-Servette HC defeated the (Russia) HC Salavat Yulaev Ufa in the final, 3–0, to win their second title.
- December 26, 2014 – January 5, 2015: 2015 World Junior Ice Hockey Championship in Toronto and Montreal (final at the Air Canada Centre)
  - Canada defeated Russia, 5–4, to win its 16th World Junior Ice Hockey Championship title. Slovakia took the bronze medal.
- January 5 – 12: 2015 IIHF World Women's U18 Championship in Buffalo, New York
  - The United States defeated Canada, 3–2 in overtime, to win their fourth IIHF World Women's U18 Championships title. Russia took the bronze medal.
- March 14 — 15: 2015 CIS University Cup in Halifax, Nova Scotia
  - The University of Alberta Golden Bears defeated the University of New Brunswick Varsity Reds 6–3 to win their second consecutive CIS University Cup.
- March 20 – 22: 2015 NCAA National Collegiate Women's Ice Hockey Tournament Frozen Four at Ridder Arena in Minneapolis
  - The Minnesota Golden Gophers defeated the (Massachusetts) Harvard Crimson, 4–1, to win their fifth NCAA National Collegiate Women's Ice Hockey title.
- March 28 – April 4: 2015 IIHF Women's World Championship in (Sweden) Malmö
  - The United States defeated Canada, 7–5, to win their sixth IIHF Women's World Championship title. Finland took the bronze medal.
- April 9 & 11: 2015 NCAA Division I Men's Ice Hockey Tournament Frozen Four at TD Garden in (Massachusetts) Boston
  - The (Rhode Island) Providence Friars defeated the (Massachusetts) Boston University Terriers, 4–3, to win their first NCAA Division I Men's Ice Hockey Tournament title.
- April 13 – 18: 2015 Allan Cup in (Canada) Clarenville, Newfoundland and Labrador
  - The (Manitoba) South East Prairie Thunder defeated the (Alberta) Bentley Generals, 2–0, to win their second Allan Cup title.
- April 16 – 26: 2015 IIHF World U18 Championships in (Switzerland) Zug and Lucerne
  - The United States defeated Finland, 2–1 in overtime, to win their ninth IIHF World U18 Championships title. Canada won the bronze medal.
- April 24 – May 3: 2015 IPC Ice Sledge Hockey World Championships in Buffalo
  - The United States defeated Canada, 3–0, to win their third IPC Ice Sledge Hockey World Championships title. Russia won the bronze medal.
- May 1 – 17: 2015 IIHF World Championship in (Czech Republic) Prague and Ostrava
  - Canada defeated Russia, 6–1, to win their 25th IIHF World Championship title. The United States took the bronze medal.
- May 22 – 31: 2015 Memorial Cup in (Canada) Quebec City
  - The (Ontario) Oshawa Generals defeated the (British Columbia) Kelowna Rockets, 2–1, to win their fifth Memorial Cup title.

== Luge ==
=== Seniors World Cup ===
- November 29, 2014 – March 1, 2015: 2014–15 Luge World Cup Schedule
  - November 29 & 30, 2014: World Cup #1 in (Austria) Igls
    - Men's Individual winner: (Germany) Felix Loch
    - Men's Doubles winners: (Germany) Toni Eggert & Sascha Benecken
    - Women's Individual winner: (Germany) Natalie Geisenberger
  - December 5 & 6, 2014: World Cup #2 in (United States) Lake Placid, New York
    - Men's Individual winner: (United States) Tucker West
    - Men's Doubles winners: (Germany) Toni Eggert & Sascha Benecken
    - Women's Individual winner: (Germany) Natalie Geisenberger
  - December 12 & 13, 2014: World Cup #3 in (Canada) Calgary
    - Men's Individual winner: (Canada) Samuel Edney
    - Men's Doubles winners: (Germany) Toni Eggert & Sascha Benecken
    - Women's Individual winner: (Germany) Natalie Geisenberger
  - January 3 & 4: World Cup #4 in (Germany) Königssee
    - Men's Individual winner: (Germany) Felix Loch
    - Men's Doubles winners: (Germany) Tobias Wendl & Tobias Arlt
    - Women's Individual winner: (Germany) Natalie Geisenberger
  - January 17 & 18: World Cup #5 in (Germany) Oberhof
    - Men's Individual winner: (Germany) Felix Loch
    - Men's Doubles winners: (Germany) Tobias Wendl & Tobias Arlt
    - Women's Individual winner: (Germany) Natalie Geisenberger
  - January 24 & 25: World Cup #6 in (Germany) Winterberg
    - Men's Individual winner: (Germany) Felix Loch
    - Men's Doubles winners: (Germany) Toni Eggert & Sascha Benecken
    - Women's Individual winner: (Germany) Natalie Geisenberger
  - January 31 & February 1: World Cup #7 in (Norway) Lillehammer
    - Men's Individual winner: (Austria) Wolfgang Kindl
    - Men's Doubles winners: (Germany) Tobias Wendl & Tobias Arlt
    - Women's Individual winner: (Russia) Tatiana Ivanova
  - February 21 & 22: World Cup #8 in (Germany) Altenberg, Saxony
    - Men's Individual winner: (Germany) Felix Loch
    - Men's Doubles winners: (Germany) Tobias Wendl & Tobias Arlt
    - Women's Individual winner: (Germany) Natalie Geisenberger
  - February 28 & March 1: World Cup #9 (final) in (Russia) Sochi
    - Men's Individual winner: (Russia) Semen Pavlichenko
    - Men's Doubles winners: (Germany) Tobias Wendl & Tobias Arlt
    - Women's Individual winner: (Germany) Dajana Eitberger

=== Juniors World Cup ===
- December 4, 2014 – February 7, 2015: 2014–15 Junior Luge World Cup Schedule
  - December 4 & 5, 2014: Junior World Cup #1 in (Canada) Whistler
    - Men's Individual winner: (Australia) Alexander Ferlazzo
    - Men's Doubles winners: (Russia) Stanislav Maltsev & Oleg Faskhutdinov
    - Women's Individual winner: (Germany) Jessica Tiebel
  - December 6 & 7, 2014: Junior World Cup #2 in (Canada) Whistler
    - Men's Individual winner: (Germany) Sebastian Bley
    - Men's Doubles winners: (Germany) Nico Semmler & Johannes Pfeiffer
    - Women's Individual winner: (Germany) Julia Taubitz
    - Team Sprint winners: Russia (Victoria Demchenko, Roman Repilov, Evgeny Evdokimov & Alexey Groshev)
  - December 15 & 16, 2014: Junior World Cup #3 in (United States) Park City, Utah
    - Men's Individual winner: (Russia) Roman Repilov
    - Men's Doubles winners: (Russia) Stanislav Maltsev & Oleg Faskhutdinov
    - Women's Individual winner: (Germany) Jessica Tiebel
    - Team winners: Russia (Victoria Demchenko, Roman Repilov, and Stanislav Maltsev & Oleg Faskhutdinov)
  - January 24 & 25: Junior World Cup #4 in (Germany) Oberhof
    - Men's Individual winner: (Germany) Sebastian Bley
    - Men's Doubles winners: (Germany) Florian Löffler & Manuel Stiebing
    - Women's Individual winner: (Germany) Jessica Tiebel
    - Team Sprint winners: Russia (Victoria Demchenko, Roman Repilov, Evgeny Evdokimov & Alexey Groshev)
  - January 30 & 31: Junior World Cup #5 in Igls
    - Men's Individual winner: (Italy) Theo Gruber
    - Women's Individual winner: (Germany) Julia Taubitz
    - Men's Doubles winners: (Austria) David Trojer & Philip Knoll
    - Team winners: Austria (Katrin Heinzelmaier, Nico Gleirscher, David Trojer & Philip Knoll)
  - February 6 & 7: Junior World Cup #6 (final) in Winterberg
    - Men's Individual winner: (Germany) Sebastian Bley
    - Women's Individual winner: (Austria) Madeleine Egle
    - Men's Doubles winners: (Austria) David Trojer & Philip Knoll
    - Team winners: Germany (Saskia Langer, Sebastian Bley, Florian Löffler & Manuel Stiebing)

=== Sprint Cup ===
- November 29, 2014 – February 22, 2015: 2014–15 Luge Sprint Cup Schedule
  - November 29 & 30, 2014: In conjunction with the first World Cup in Austria
    - Men's winner: (Germany) Felix Loch
    - Women's winner: (Germany) Natalie Geisenberger
    - Doubles winners: (Germany) Toni Eggert & Sascha Benecken
  - December 12 & 13, 2014: In conjunction with the third World Cup in Canada
    - Men's winner: (United States) Chris Mazdzer
    - Women's winner: (Canada) Alex Gough
    - Doubles winners: (Germany) Tobias Wendl & Tobias Arlt
  - February 21 & 22: In conjunction with the eighth World Cup in Germany (final)
    - Men's winner: (Germany) Felix Loch
    - Women's winner: (United States) Erin Hamlin
    - Doubles winners: (Germany) Toni Eggert & Sascha Benecken

=== Team Relay World Cup ===
- December 5, 2014 – March 1, 2015: 2014–15 Team relay World Cup Schedule
  - December 5 & 6, 2014: In conjunction with the second World Cup in the United States
    - Winners: Germany (Natalie Geisenberger, Felix Loch, and Toni Eggert & Sascha Benecken)
  - January 3 & 4: In conjunction with the fourth World Cup in Germany
    - Winners: Germany (Natalie Geisenberger, Felix Loch, and Tobias Wendl & Tobias Arlt)
  - January 17 & 18: In conjunction with the fifth World Cup in Germany
    - Winners: Germany (Natalie Geisenberger, Felix Loch, and Tobias Wendl & Tobias Arlt)
  - January 24 & 25: In conjunction with the sixth World Cup in Germany
    - Winners: Germany (Natalie Geisenberger, Felix Loch, and Toni Eggert & Sascha Benecken)
  - January 31 & February 1: In conjunction with the seventh World Cup in Norway
    - Winners: Germany (Dajana Eitberger, Felix Loch, and Tobias Wendl & Tobias Arlt)
  - February 28 & March 1: In conjunction with the ninth World Cup in Russia (final)
    - Winners: Germany (Dajana Eitberger, Felix Loch, and Tobias Wendl & Tobias Arlt)

=== World and regional luge championships ===
- January 16 & 17: 2015 FIL Junior World Championships in (Norway) Lillehammer
  - Men's winner: (Russia) Roman Repilov
  - Women's winner: (Germany) Jessica Tiebel
  - Men's Doubles winners: (Germany) Florian Loeffler / Manuel Stiebing
  - Team Relay winners: (Latvia) Ulla Zirne, Kristers Aparjods, and Kristens Putins & Karlis Kriss Matuzels
- January 24 & 25: 2015 Junior European Luge Championships in (Germany) Oberhof
  - Men's winner: (Germany) Sabastian Bley
  - Women's winner: (Germany) Jessica Tiebel
  - Men's Doubles winners: (Germany) Florian Loeffler / Manuel Stiebing
  - Team Relay winners: (Russia) Victoria Demchenko, Roman Repilov, Evgeny Evdokimov & Alexei Groshev
- February 14 & 15: 2015 FIL World Luge Championships in (Latvia) Sigulda
  - Men's winner: (Russia) Semen Pavlichenko
  - Women's winner: (Germany) Natalie Geisenberger
  - Men's Doubles winners: (Germany) Tobias Wendl / Tobias Arlt
  - Mixed Team Relay winners: (Germany) Natalie Geisenberger, Felix Loch, Tobias Wendl & Tobias Arlt
  - Men's Under-23 winner: (Russia) Aleksander Peretyagin
  - Women's Under-23 Singles winner: (Russia) Ekaterina Katnikova
  - Men's Under-23 Doubles winners (Russia) Andrey Bogdanov / Andrey Medvedev
- February 28 & March 1: 2015 FIL European Luge Championships in (Russia) Sochi
  - Men's Individual winner: (Russia) Semen Pavlichenko
  - Men's Doubles winners: (Germany) Tobias Wendl & Tobias Arlt
  - Women's Individual winner: (Germany) Dajana Eitberger
  - Team Relay winners: (Germany) Dajana Eitberger, Felix Loch, Tobias Wendl & Tobias Arlt

== Speed skating ==
=== Long track speed skating ===
==== LT World Cup ====
- November 14, 2014 – March 22, 2015: 2014–15 ISU Speed Skating World Cup
  - November 14 – 16, 2014, in (Japan) Obihiro
    - The Netherlands won both the gold and overall medal tallies.
  - November 21 – 23, 2014, in (South Korea) Seoul
    - Russia won the gold medal tally. The Netherlands won the overall medal tally.
  - December 5 – 7, 2014, in (Germany) Berlin
    - The Netherlands won both the gold and overall medal tallies.
  - December 12 – 14, 2014, in Heerenveen (#1)
    - Host nation, the Netherlands, Russia, and the United States won 3 gold medals each. The Netherlands won the overall medal tally.
  - January 31 & February 1 in (Norway) Hamar
    - The Netherlands won both the gold and overall medal tallies.
  - February 7 & 8 in Heerenveen (#2)
    - The United States won the gold medal tally. The Netherlands and the United States won 5 overall medals each.
  - March 21 & 22 in (Germany) Erfurt (final)
    - The United States won the gold medal tally. The Netherlands won the overall medal tally.
- Men's overall winner: (Russia) Pavel Kulizhnikov
- Women's overall winner: (United States) Heather Richardson

==== LT Junior World Cup ====
- November 22, 2014 – February 15, 2015: 2014–15 ISU Junior World Cup Speed Skating
  - November 22 & 23, 2014, in (Canada) Calgary
    - Japan won both the gold and overall medal tallies.
  - December 13 & 14, 2014, in (Belarus) Minsk
    - The Netherlands won both the gold and overall medal tallies.
  - January 10 & 11 in (China) Changchun
    - South Korea won both the gold and overall medal tallies.
  - January 17 & 18 in (Italy) Collalbo
    - The Netherlands won both the gold and overall medal tallies.
  - February 14 & 15 in (Poland) Warsaw (final)
    - The Netherlands won both the gold and overall medal tallies.

==== Long track speed skating championships ====
- January 10 & 11: 2015 Asian Single Distance Speed Skating Championships in (China) Changchun
  - Men's 500m winner #1: (Chinese Taipei) Sung Ching-yang
  - Men's 500m #2 and overall winner: (Chinese Taipei) Sung Ching-yang
  - Women's 500m winner #1: (China) Zhang Hong
  - Women's 500m #2 and overall winner: (China) Zhang Hong
  - Men's 1000m winner: (China) LI Bailin
  - Women's 1000m winner: (China) Zhang Hong
  - Men's 1500m winner: (China) LI Bailin
  - Women's 1500m winner: (China) Li Qishi
  - Men's 5000m winner: (China) Sun Longjiang
  - Women's 3000m winner: (China) Zhao Xin
  - Men's 10,000m winner: (China) Sun Longjiang
  - Women's 5000m winner: (China) HAO Jiachen
- January 10 & 11: 2015 European Speed Skating Championships in (Russia) Chelyabinsk
  - Men's 500m winner: (Netherlands) Koen Verweij
  - Women's 500m winner: (Netherlands) Ireen Wüst
  - Men's 1500m winner: (Russia) Denis Yuskov
  - Women's 1500m winner: (Netherlands) Ireen Wüst
  - Men's 5000m winner: (Netherlands) Sven Kramer
  - Women's 3000m winner: (Czech Republic) Martina Sábliková
  - Men's 10,000m winner: (Netherlands) Sven Kramer
  - Women's 5000m winner: (Czech Republic) Martina Sábliková
- February 12 – 15: 2015 World Single Distance Speed Skating Championships in Heerenveen
  - Men's 500m winner #1: (Russia) Pavel Kulizhnikov
  - Men's 500m #2 winner and overall winner: (Russia) Pavel Kulizhnikov
  - Women's 500m winner #1: (United States) Heather Richardson
  - Women's 500m #2 winner and overall winner: (United States) Heather Richardson
  - Men's 1000m winner: (United States) Shani Davis
  - Women's 1000m winner: (United States) Brittany Bowe
  - Men's 1500m winner: (Russia) Denis Yuskov
  - Women's 1500m winner: (United States) Brittany Bowe
  - Men's 5000m winner: (Netherlands) Sven Kramer
  - Women's 3000m winner: (Czech Republic) Martina Sábliková
  - Men's 10,000m winner: (Netherlands) Jorrit Bergsma
  - Women's 5000m winner: (Czech Republic) Martina Sábliková
  - Men's Team Pursuit winners: Netherlands (Sven Kramer, Koen Verweij, Douwe de Vries, Wouter olde Heuvel)
  - Women's Team Pursuit winners: Japan (Ayaka Kikuchi, Miho Takagi, Nana Takagi, Maki Tabata)
  - Men's Mass Start winner: (Netherlands) Arjan Stroetinga
  - Women's Mass Start winner: (Netherlands) Irene Schouten
- February 20 – 22: 2015 World Junior Speed Skating Championships in (Poland) Warsaw
  - Men's Junior 500m winner: (South Korea) Kim Jun-ho
  - Women's Junior 500m winner: (Austria) Vanessa Bittner
  - Men's Junior 1000m winner: (China) FAN Yang
  - Women's Junior 1000m winner: (Austria) Vanessa Bittner
  - Men's Junior 1500m winner: (Netherlands) Patrick Roest
  - Women's Junior 1500m winner: (Netherlands) Melissa Wijfje
  - Men's Junior 5000m winner: (Sweden) Nils van der Poel
  - Women's Junior 3000m winner: (Netherlands) Melissa Wijfje
  - Men's Junior Team Sprint winners: (South Korea) YANG Seung-yong / KIM Jun-ho / KIM Min-seok
  - Women's Junior Team Sprint winners: (South Korea) KIM Min-sun / JANG Mi / PARK Cho-won
  - Men's Junior Team Pursuit winners: (Netherlands) Marcel Bosker / Wesly Dijs / Patrick Roest
  - Women's Junior Team Pursuit winners: (Netherlands) Sanneke de Neeling / Esmée Visser / Melissa Wijfje
  - Men's Junior Mass Start winner: (South Korea) OH Hyun-min
  - Women's Junior Mass Start winner: (Austria) Vanessa Bittner
  - Men's Junior All Round winner: (Netherlands) Patrick Roest
  - Women's Junior All Round winner: (Netherlands) Melissa Wijfje
- February 28 & March 1: 2015 World Sprint Speed Skating Championships in (Kazakhstan) Astana
  - Men's overall winner: (Russia) Pavel Kulizhnikov
  - Women's overall winner: (United States) Brittany Bowe
- March 7 – 8: 2015 World Allround Speed Skating Championships in (Canada) Calgary
  - Men's overall winner: (Netherlands) Sven Kramer
  - Women's overall winner: (Czech Republic) Martina Sáblíková

=== Short track speed skating ===
==== ST World Cup ====
- November 7, 2014 – February 15, 2015: 2014–15 ISU Short Track Speed Skating World Cup
  - November 7 – 9, 2014, in (United States) Salt Lake City
    - Men: Both South Korea and Russia won 2 gold and 4 overall medals each.
    - Women: South Korea won both the gold and overall medal tallies.
  - November 14 – 16, 2014, in (Canada) Montreal
    - Men: South Korea won both the gold and overall medal tallies.
    - Women: South Korea won both the gold and overall medal tallies.
  - December 12 – 14, 2014, in Shanghai
    - Men: South Korea won the gold medal tally. Canada won the overall medal tally.
    - Women: China won both the gold and overall medal tallies.
  - December 19 – 21, 2014, in Seoul
    - Men: Host nation, South Korea, won both the gold and overall medal tallies.
    - Women: Host nation, South Korea, and China won 3 gold medals each. South Korea won the overall medal tally.
  - February 6 – 8 in (Germany) Dresden
    - Men: Russia won the gold medal tally. South Korea and Russia won 4 overall medals each.
    - Women: South Korea won the gold and overall medal tallies.
  - February 13 – 15 in (Turkey) Erzurum (final)
    - Men: China won the gold and overall medal tallies.
    - Women: Italy and China won 2 gold medals each. Canada won the overall medal tally.

==== Short track speed skating championships ====
- January 23 – 25: 2015 European Short Track Speed Skating Championships in Dordrecht
  - Overall men's winner: (Netherlands) Sjinkie Knegt
  - Overall women's winner: (United Kingdom) Elise Christie
  - Men's medal tally: The Netherlands and Russia won 2 gold medals each. Russia won the overall medal tally.
  - Women's medal tally: Great Britain and Russia won 2 gold medals each. Russia won the overall medal tally.
- February 27 – March 1: 2015 World Junior Short Track Speed Skating Championships in (Japan) Osaka
  - Men's Junior 500m winner: (South Korea) KIM Da-gyeom
  - Women's Junior 500m winner: (South Korea) SON Ha-kyung
  - Men's Junior 1000m winner: (South Korea) KIM Da-gyeom
  - Women's Junior 1000m winner: (South Korea) KIM Ji-yoo
  - Men's Junior 1500m winner: (South Korea) PARK Ji-won
  - Women's Junior 1500m winner: (South Korea) Kong Sang-jeong
  - Men's Junior 3000m Relay winners: (South Korea) PARK Ji-won / KIM Da-gyeom / LIM Yong-jin / YOON Sumin
  - Women's Junior 3000m Relay winners: (South Korea) SON Ha-kyung / KIM Ji-yoo / Kong Sang-jeong / LEE Suyoun
  - Men's Junior Overall winner: (South Korea) KIM Da-gyeom
  - Women's Junior Overall winner: (South Korea) Kong Sang-jeong
- March 13 – 15: 2015 World Short Track Speed Skating Championships in (Russia) Moscow
  - Men's 500m winner: (China) Wu Dajing
  - Women's 500m winner: (China) Fan Kexin
  - Men's 1000m winner: (South Korea) Park Se-yeong
  - Women's 1000m winner: (South Korea) Choi Min-jeong
  - Men's 1500m winner: (Russia) Semion Elistratov
  - Women's 1500m winner: (Italy) Arianna Fontana
  - Men's 3000m winner: (Netherlands) Sjinkie Knegt
  - Women's 3000m winner: (South Korea) Choi Min-jeong
  - Men's 5000m Team Relay winners: (China) (Wu Dajing, Chen Dequan, Xu Hongzhi, Han Tianyu)
  - Women's 3000m Team Relay winners: (South Korea) (Noh Do Hee, Shim Suk-hee, Kim A-lang, Choi Min-jeong)
- Men's overall winner: (Netherlands) Sjinkie Knegt
- Women's overall winner: (South Korea) Choi Min-jeong

== See also ==
- 2015 in athletics (track and field)
- 2015 in skiing
- 2015 in sports
