= Dnipro (bandy club) =

Ukrainian bandy club

- City: Dnipro, Ukraine
- Founded: 2008
- Home arena: "Ice Arena" (400 seats)
- Colors
- Captain: (Ukraine) Суздалев Юрій Васильович, Suzdalev Yuriy Vasyliovych

Dnipro (Ukrainian: "Дніпро") is a bandy club from Dnipro in eastern Ukraine. The club colours are white and blue.

Dnipro won the Ukrainian championship in 2014 and 2016. It was the runner-up in 2013 and 2015.

== History ==
Bandy club "Dnipro" was founded in 2008. The basis of the first composition of the team consisted of roller hockey players. In the future, the team was replenished with its own bandy players and local ice hockey players. During the team's first years it participated in local competitions - the championship and cup of Dnipropetrovsk and Dnipropetrovsk region.

Since 2011, the team has been participating in national and international competitions.

== Ukraine national team members ==
Team players who participated in the Bandy World Championships as part of the Ukraine national bandy team include: Gennady Babenko (goalkeeper), Yuriy Suzdalev (Суздалев Юрій Васильович), Anton Lozovoy, Viktor Shatalov, Ilya Ivanov, Vyacheslav Kuzmin, Mykhailo Skalytskyi, Mykhailo Ivanov, Vyacheslav Chernavin.

Team players who participated in the U15 and U17 world championships as part of the youth national team of Ukraine: Heorhiy Sosyedka (goalkeeper), Anton Ryapolov, Arkadiy Nagoga, Bohdan Arabov, Volodymyr Golets, Dmytro Bereza, Dmytro Poperezhai, Ivan Shvedchenko, Mykhailo Ivanov, Mykhailo Skalytskyi, and Serhii Terentiev.

== Notable players ==
- (Ukraine) Suzdalev Yuriy Vasyliovych (Суздалев Юрій Васильович)

== Achievements ==
- Winner of the Super Cup of Ukraine 2013.
- The winner of the international tournament "DniproBandy" in 2012 and 2013.
- The winner of the youth championship of Ukraine in 2014 and 2015.
- Winner of the "Crimea Open" tournament (Simferopol, 2011).
- Silver medalist of the championships of Ukraine 2012/13 and 2014/15.
- Finalist of the Cup of Ukraine 2012.
- Participant of the Renaissance Cup (Budy, 2012).

== Gallery ==
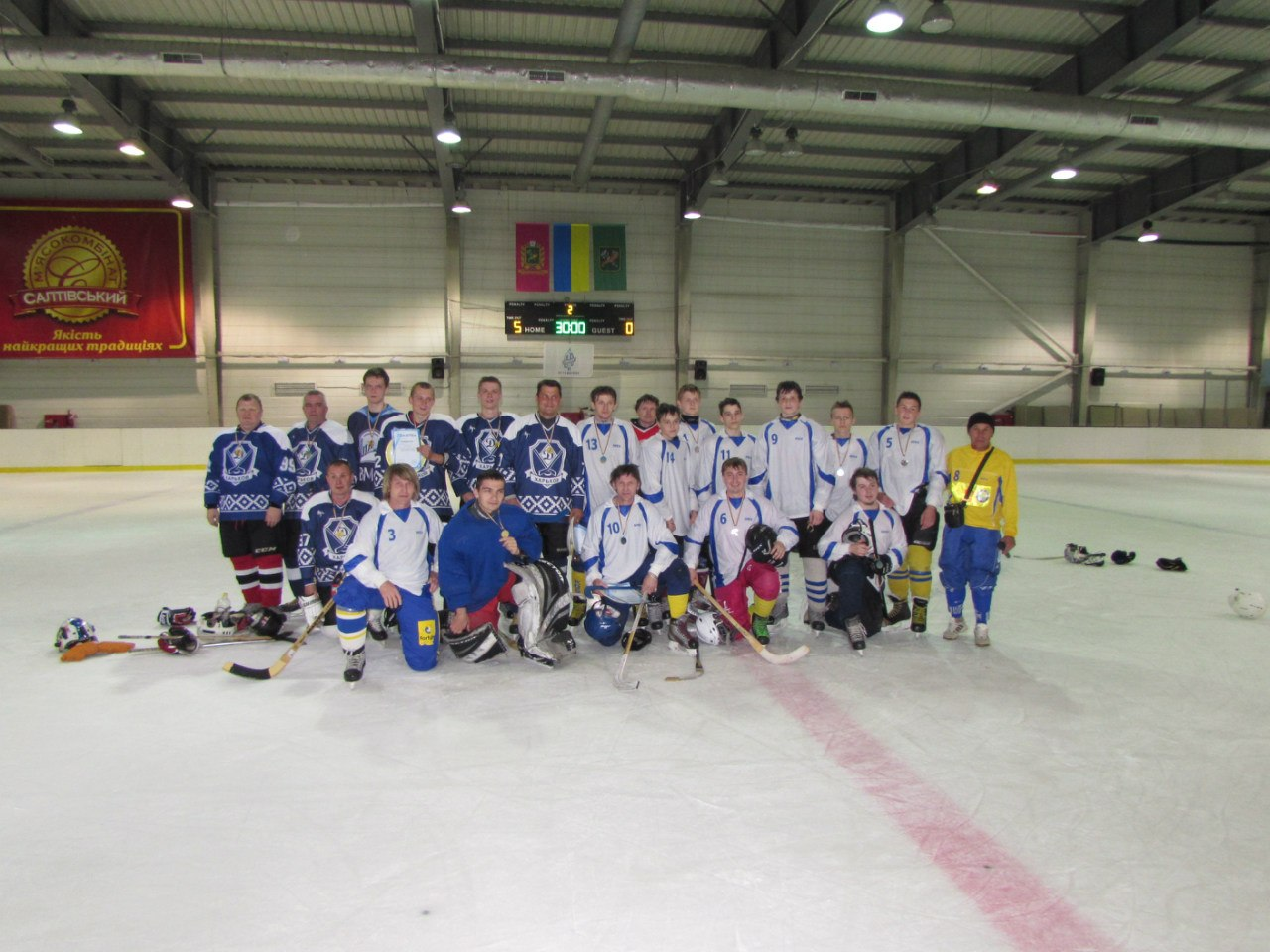
2015 champions, "Dynamo" Kharkiv, and the silver medalists, "Dnipro"

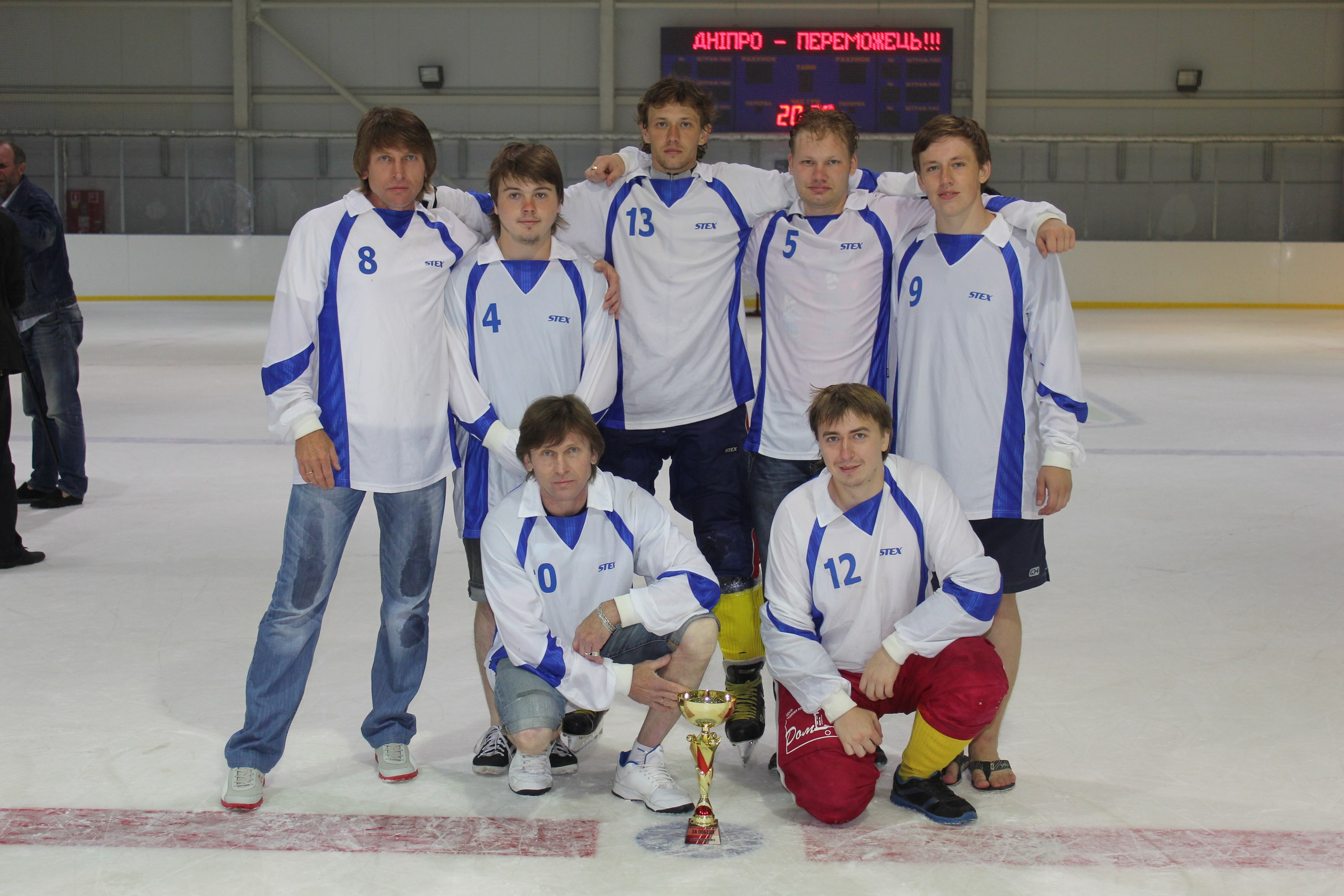
2016 national bandy champions, Dnipro Dnipropetrovsk.

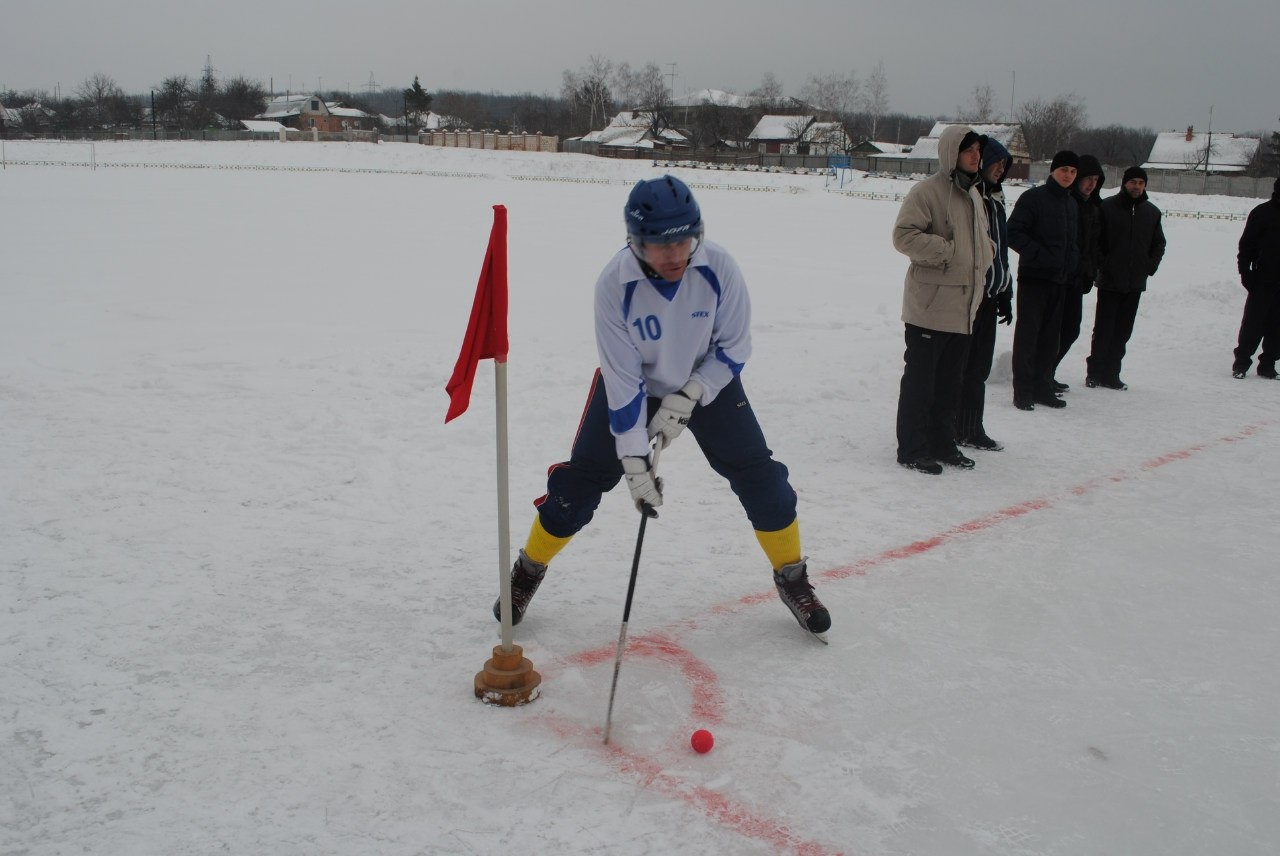
Suzdalev Yuriy Vasyliovych (Суздалев Юрій Васильович) in 2015

== See also ==
- Ukraine national bandy team
- List of Ukrainian bandy champions
- Ukrainian Bandy and Rink bandy Federation
