= Dynamo Kharkiv =

Dynamo Kharkiv may refer to

- FC Dynamo Kharkiv
- HC Dynamo Kharkiv
- Dynamo Kharkiv (bandy)
