= Azot Severodonetsk =

Ukrainian bandy club

Azot Severodonetsk is a bandy club based in Sievierodonetsk, Ukraine. It plays its home games at Sievierodonetsk city stadium. The club colour is orange.

Azot Severodonetsk won the Ukrainian championship in 2012. This was the first Ukrainian bandy final since Ukraine became independent in 1991.
