= Avangard Budy =

- City: Budy, Ukraine
- Home arena: Budy stadium Palace of Sport; Saltivsky Lid

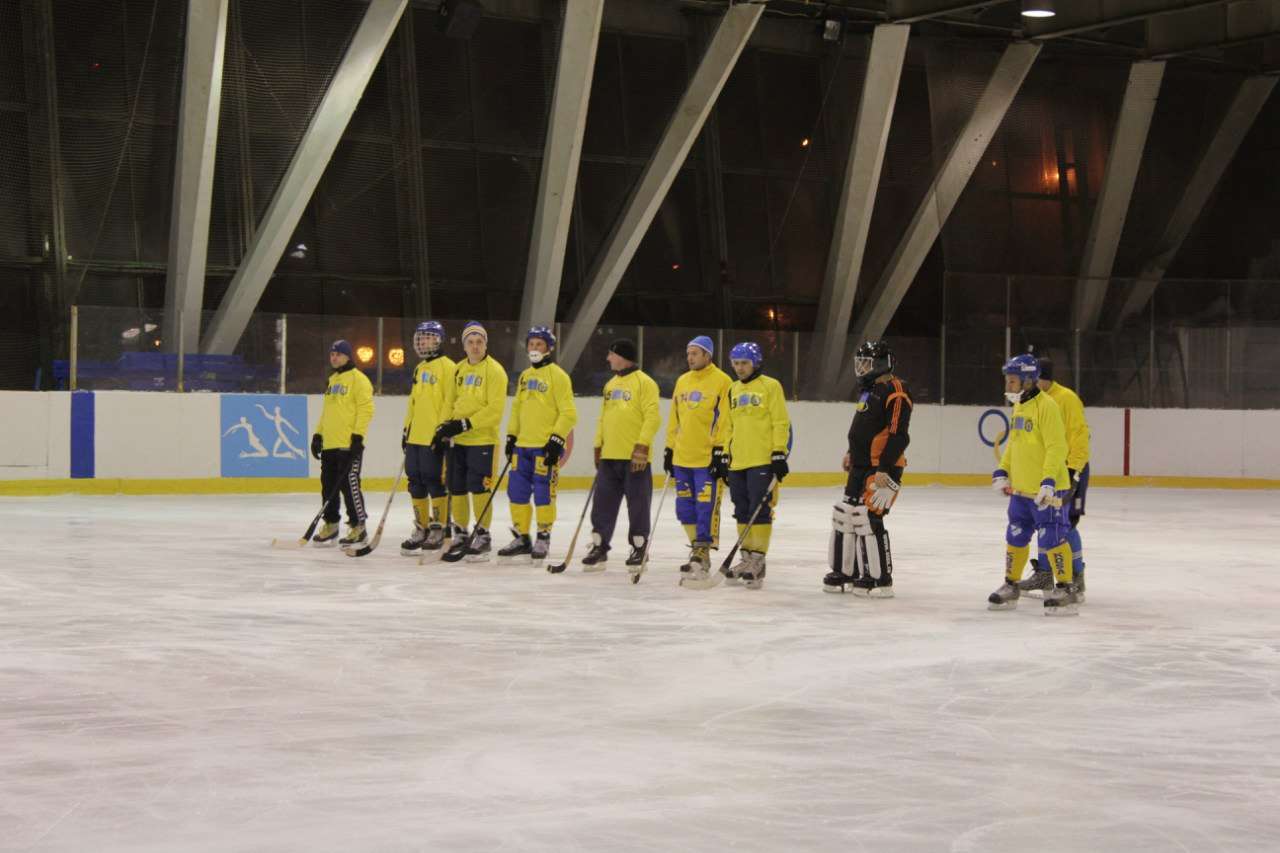

Avangard Budy is a bandy club from Budy in Kharkiv Raion, in eastern Ukraine. The club colours are yellow, blue and black and the home games are played at Budy stadium, at Palace of Sport in Kharkiv and at "Saltivsky Lid" in Kharkiv.

Avangard Budy won the Ukrainian championship in 2013. They also won the Ukrainian championship five times in the era of Ukrainian SSR.
