= List of Ukrainian bandy champions =

Ukraine national bandy championships (Men's)
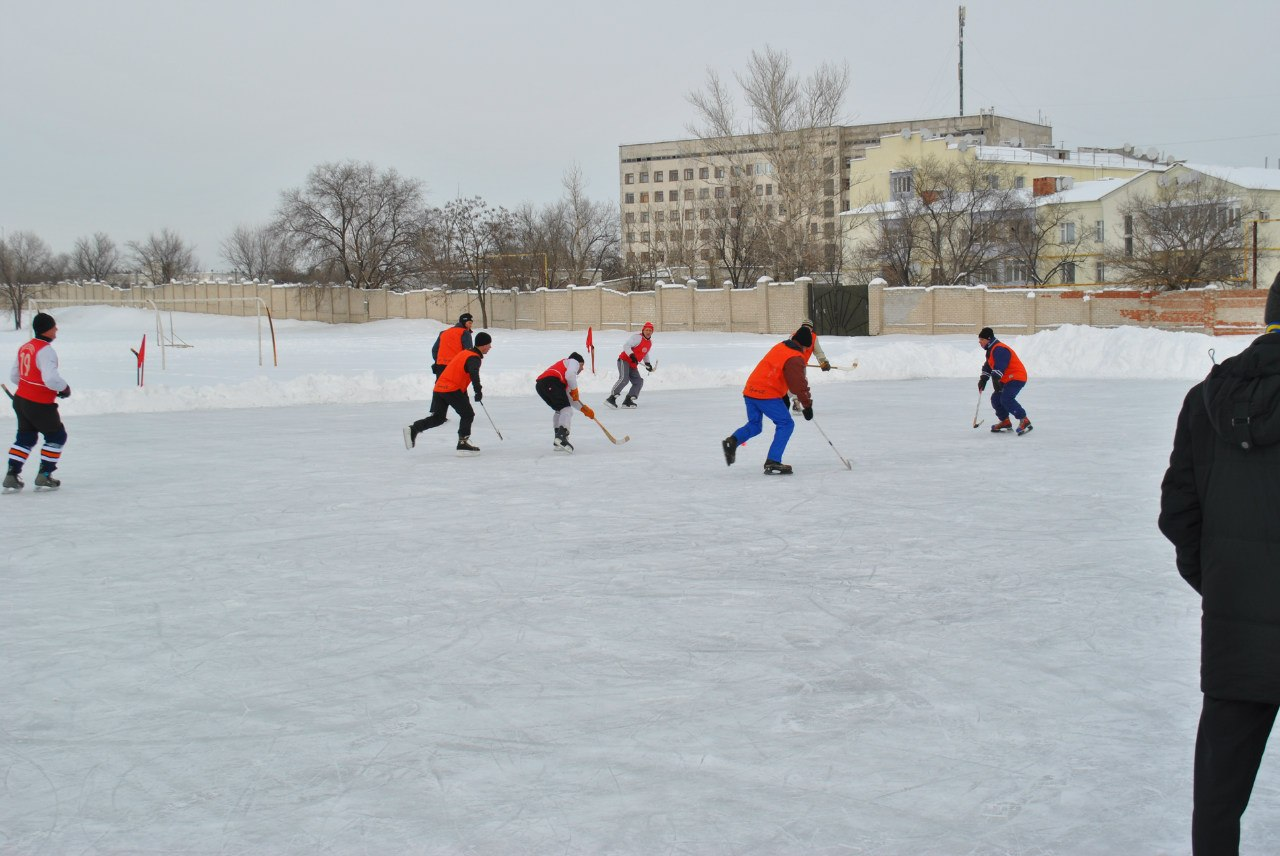
- 2012 National Championship in Severodonetsk, Luhansk region
- Sport: Bandy
- Founded: 2012; 14 years ago
- Country: Ukraine
- Website: Ukrainian Bandy and Rink bandy Federation

This list of Ukrainian bandy champions shows the winners and the runners-up for each year of the Ukrainian national bandy championship for men and is organized by the Ukrainian Bandy and Rink bandy Federation.

The national men's Ukrainian bandy champions have been crowned annually since 2012. The first national bandy championship of the independent Ukraine took place on February 26, 2012, in Severodonetsk, in the Luhansk region. The tournament was held at the city's central stadium in one day, and 4 teams took part in it: HC "Severodonetsk", "Azot" (Severodonetsk), "Avangard" (Budy) and "Dnipro" (Dnipropetrovsk).

For the 2012 season, the championship was decided by round-robin results, but in 2013-2015 a play-off with a deciding final was played instead.

Competing teams have included Avangard Budy, Azot Severodonetsk, Dnipro Dnipropetrovsk, Dynamo Kharkiv, Zenit Dnipropetrovsk, and MBC Severodonetsk.

== Winners over the years ==
=== Men's Finals ===
The national championships did not take place between 2018 and 2020.

Year	Winners	Runners-up	Score
2012	Azot Severodonetsk	MBC Severodonetsk	n/a
2013	Avangard Budy	Dnipro Dnipropetrovsk	7–3
2014	Dnipro Dnipropetrovsk	Avangard Budy	10-9
2015	Dynamo Kharkiv	Dnipro Dnipropetrovsk	5–0
2016	Dnipro Dnipropetrovsk	Zenit Dnipropetrovsk	n/a
2017	"Youth" (Lutsk)	Dnipro Dnipropetrovsk	
2018	No competition		
2019	No competition		
2020	No competition		
2021	National team of Kharkiv region	Avangard Budy	
2022			

== Gallery ==
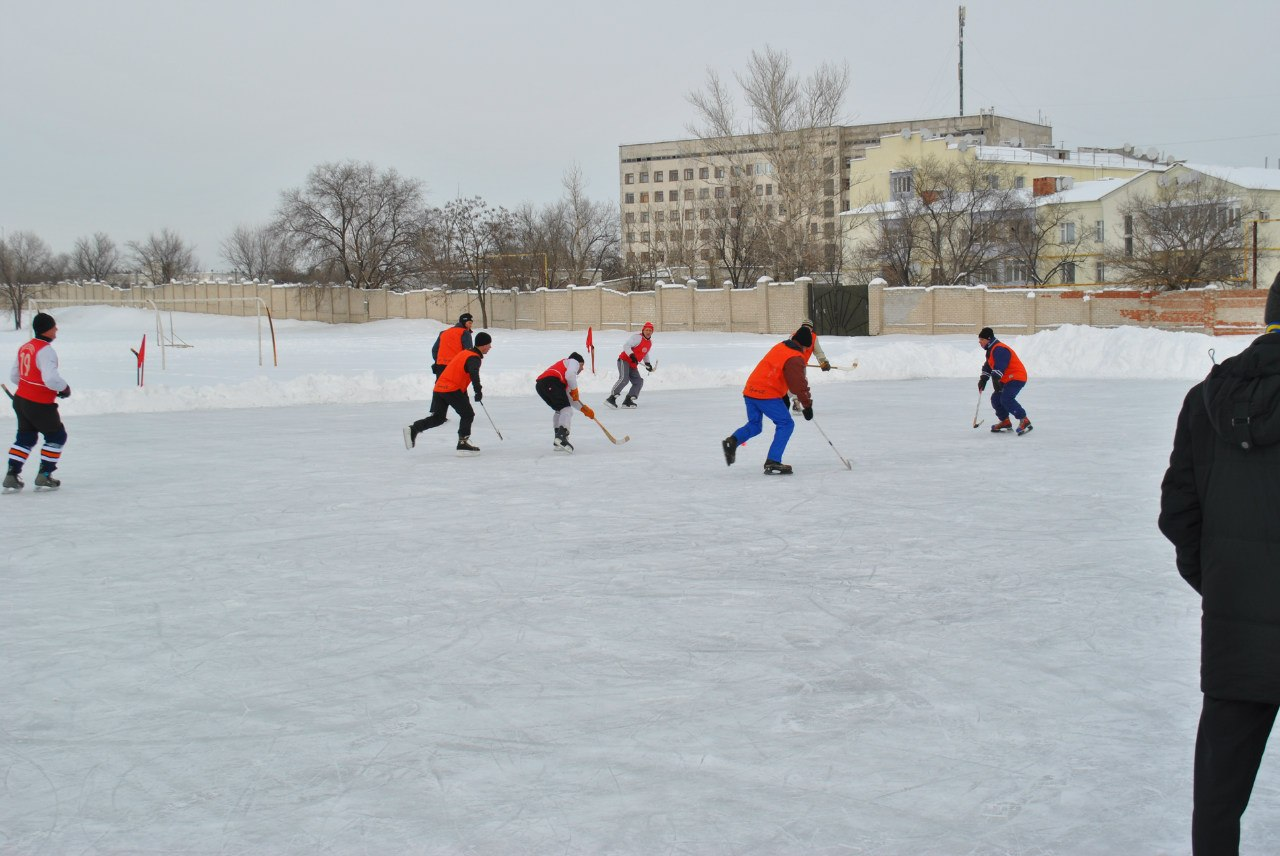
2012 National Championship in Severodonetsk, Luhansk region

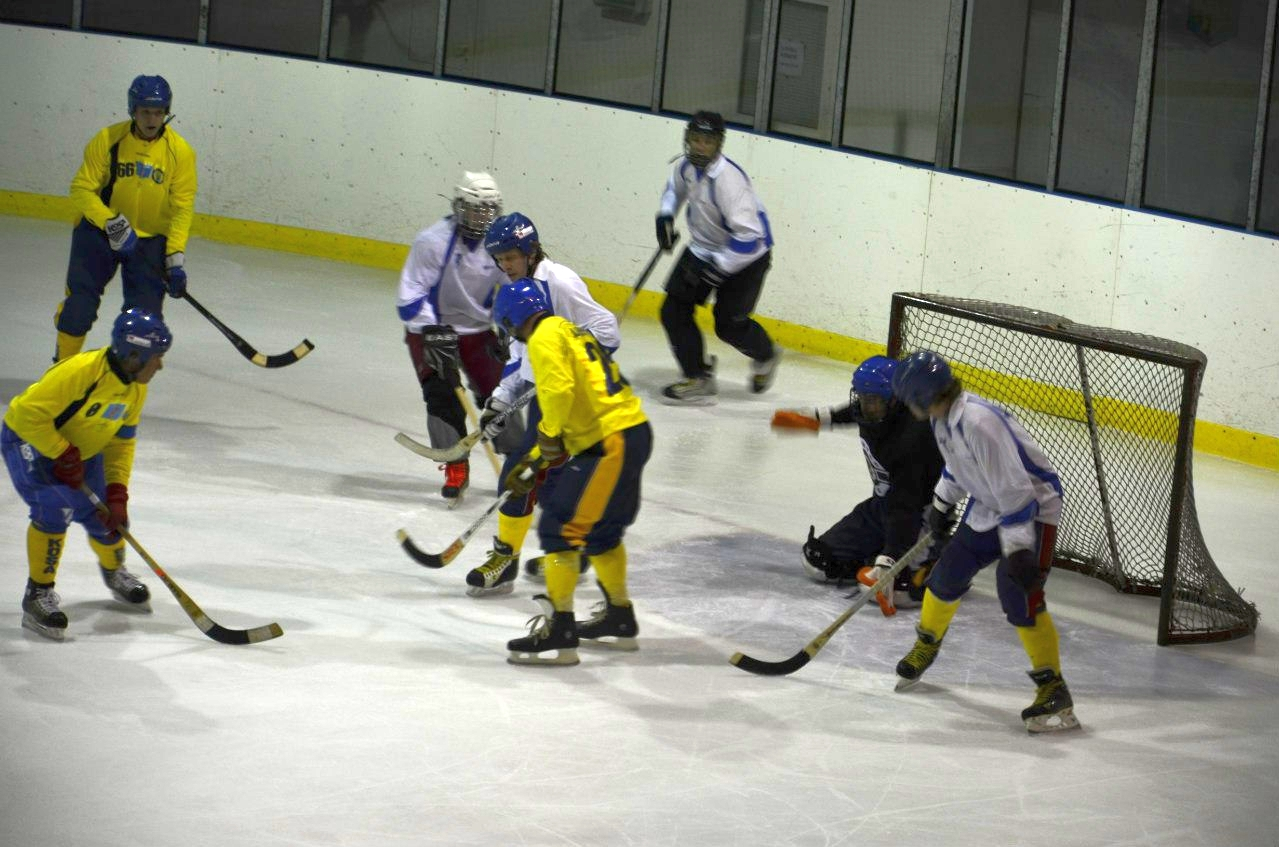
2013 National Championship

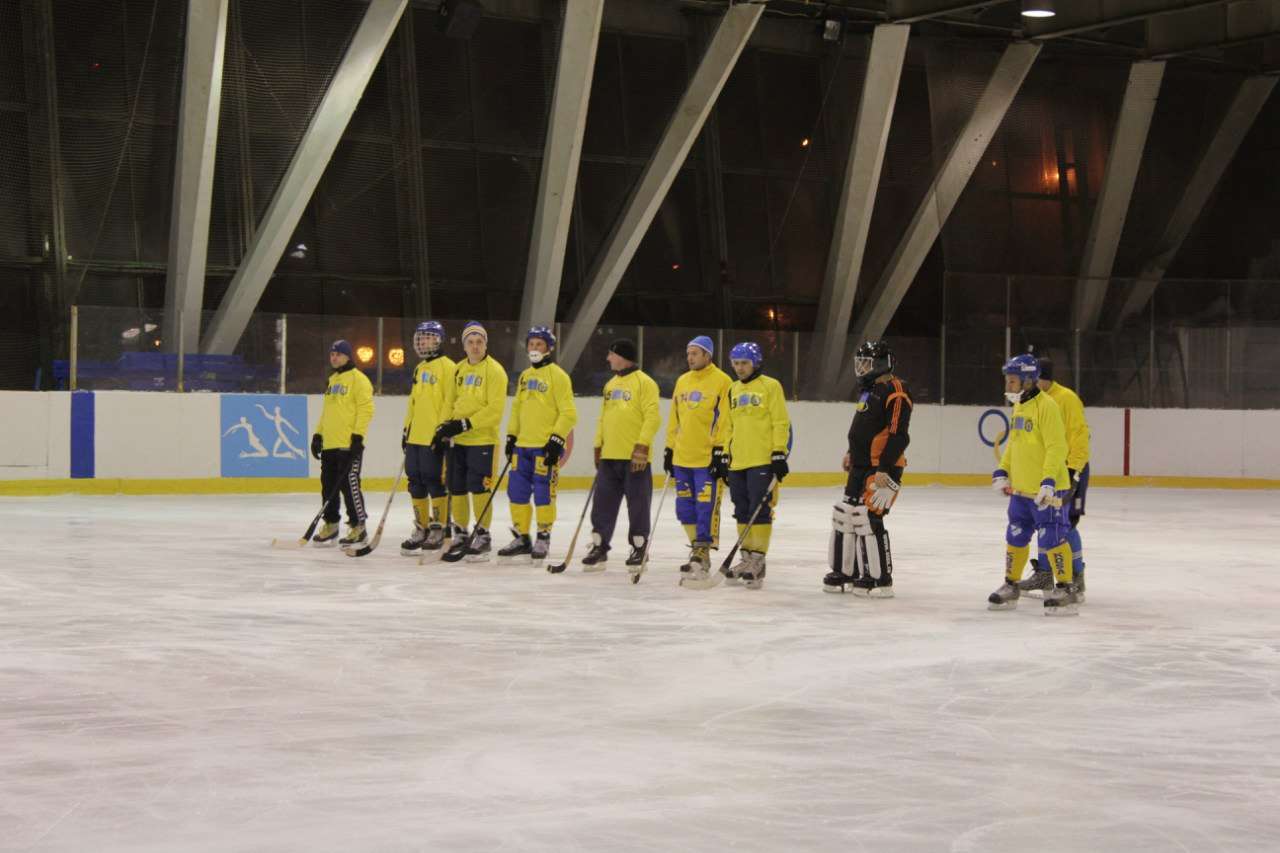
Avangard Budy in 2014

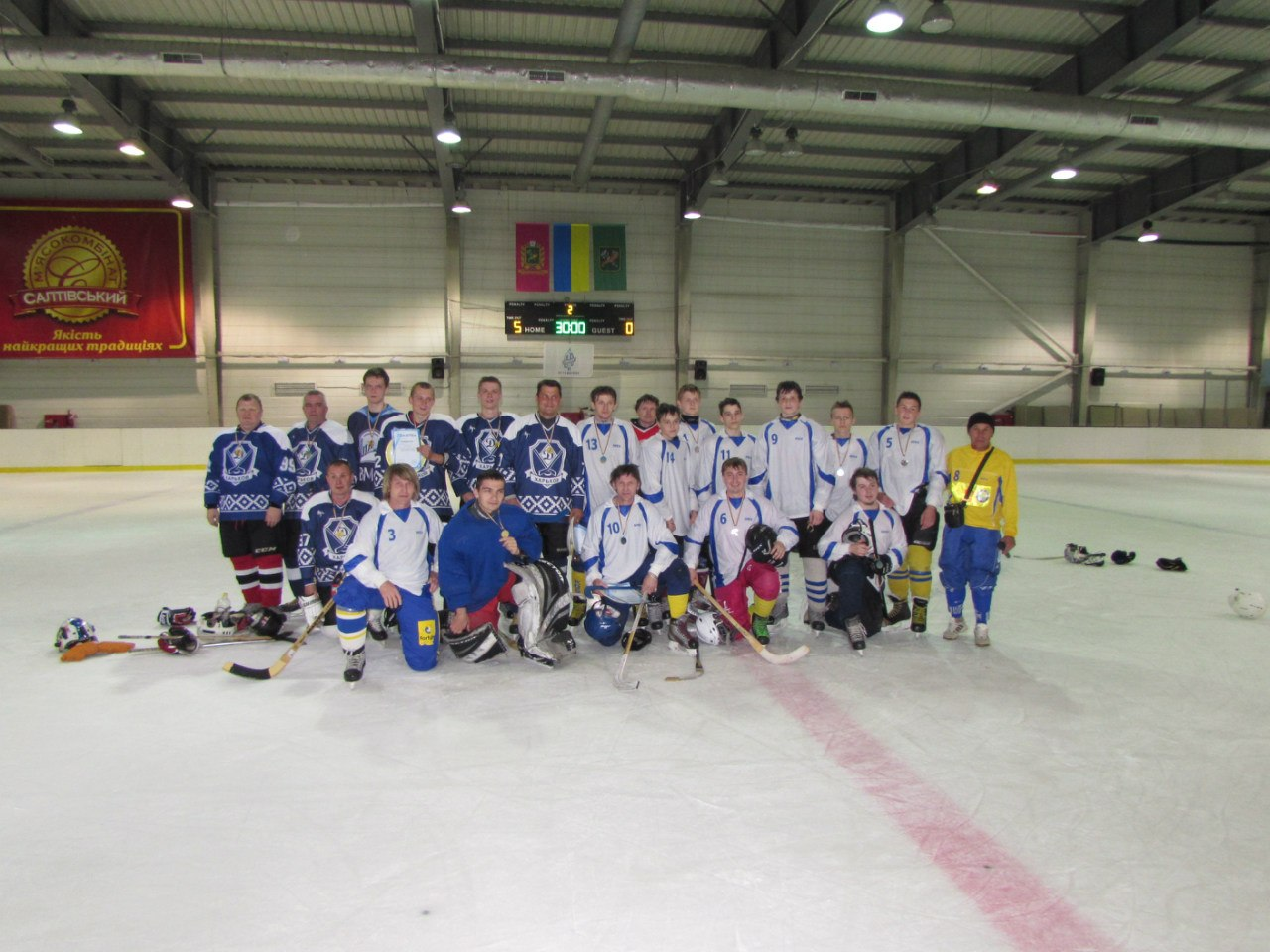
2015 national bandy champions, "Dynamo" Kharkiv, and the silver medalists, "Dnipro"

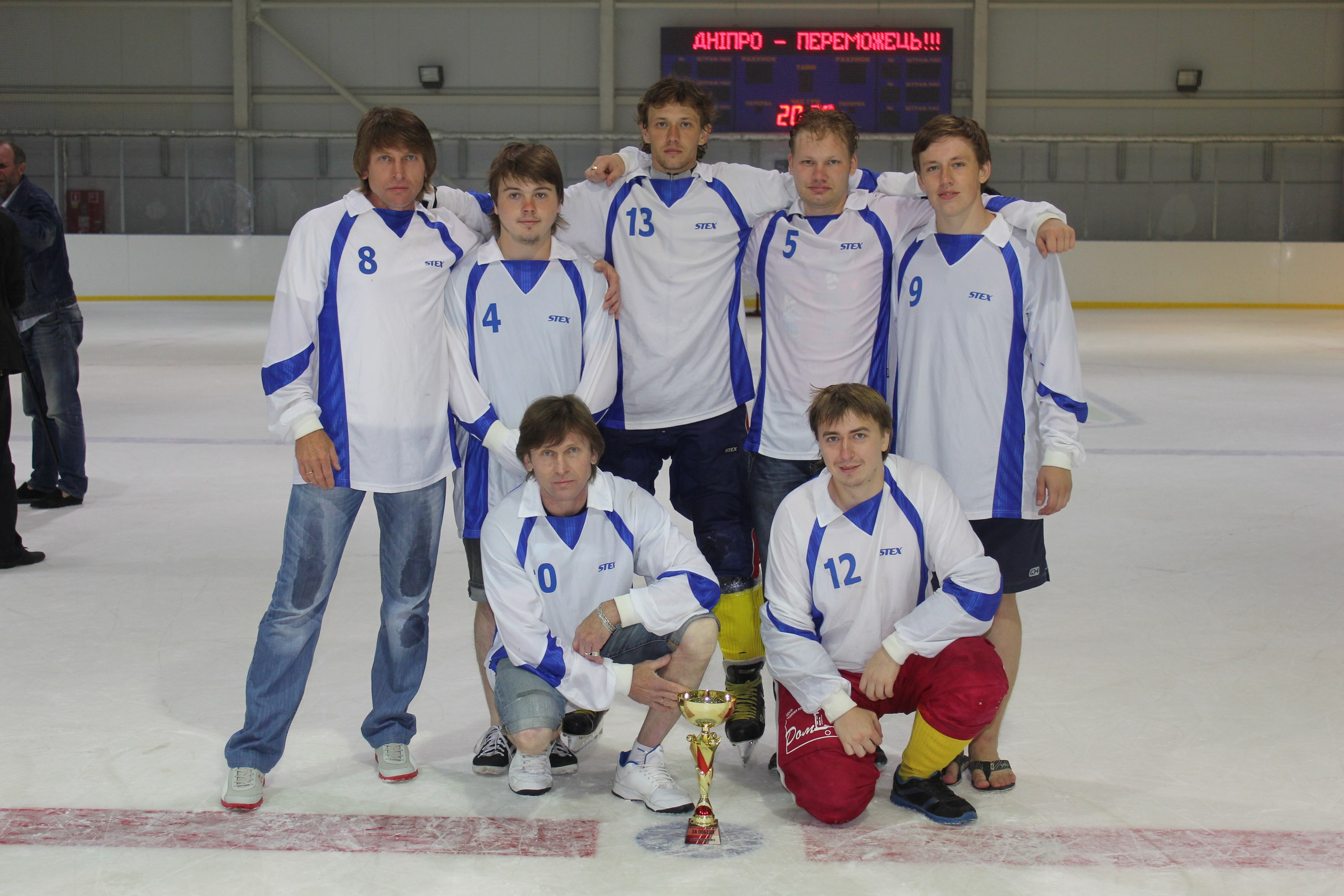
2016 national bandy champions, Dnipro Dnipropetrovsk.

== See also ==
- Ukrainian Bandy and Rink bandy Federation
- Ukraine national bandy team
