= Ukrainian Bandy and Rink bandy Federation =

Governing body for the sports of bandy and rink bandy

Ukrainian Bandy and Rink bandy Federation (UBRF) Ukrainian: Українська федерація хокею з м'ячем та рінк-бенді (УФХМР)
- Sport: Bandy and Rink bandy
- Abbreviation: UBRF (УФХМР)
- Founded: 2007; 19 years ago
- Headquarters: Dnipro, Ukraine

Official website
- ukrbandy.org.ua/index.html
- (Ukraine)

Ukrainian Bandy and Rink bandy Federation (Ukrainian: Українська федерація хокею з м'ячем та рінк-бенді (УФХМР)) known by the abbreviation, "UBRF", is the governing body for the winter team sports of bandy and rink bandy in Ukraine. The UBRF was founded in 2007 and is based in Dnipro. The federation became a member of the Federation of International Bandy (FIB) in 2008. In 2012 the organization developed its modern orientation towards the growth of bandy in Ukraine.

Within Ukraine, there are a number of regional bandy federations under the national federation. Since 2012, the national Ukrainian championship for bandy has been played every year. The first men's national bandy championship of the independent Ukraine took place on February 26, 2012 in Severodonetsk, in the Luhansk region.

At the club level, an international rink bandy club competition called Dniprobandy is organized by the Ukrainian Bandy and Rink bandy Federation.

The men's Ukraine national bandy team participated for the first time in the Bandy World Championship for men at the 2013 Bandy World Championship. At the 2016 tournament, Ukraine reached the semi-final of Division B, capturing the bronze medal. The Ukraine women's national bandy team competed internationally for the first time at the 2023 World Bandy Championship.

== History ==
In terms of licensed athletes, bandy is the second largest team winter sport in the world among male participants. The history of bandy in Ukraine dates back to 1920:

Bandy in Mykolaiv began to develop in 1920. In 1921, Nikolaev managed to perform in Moscow at the All-Union Olympiad.

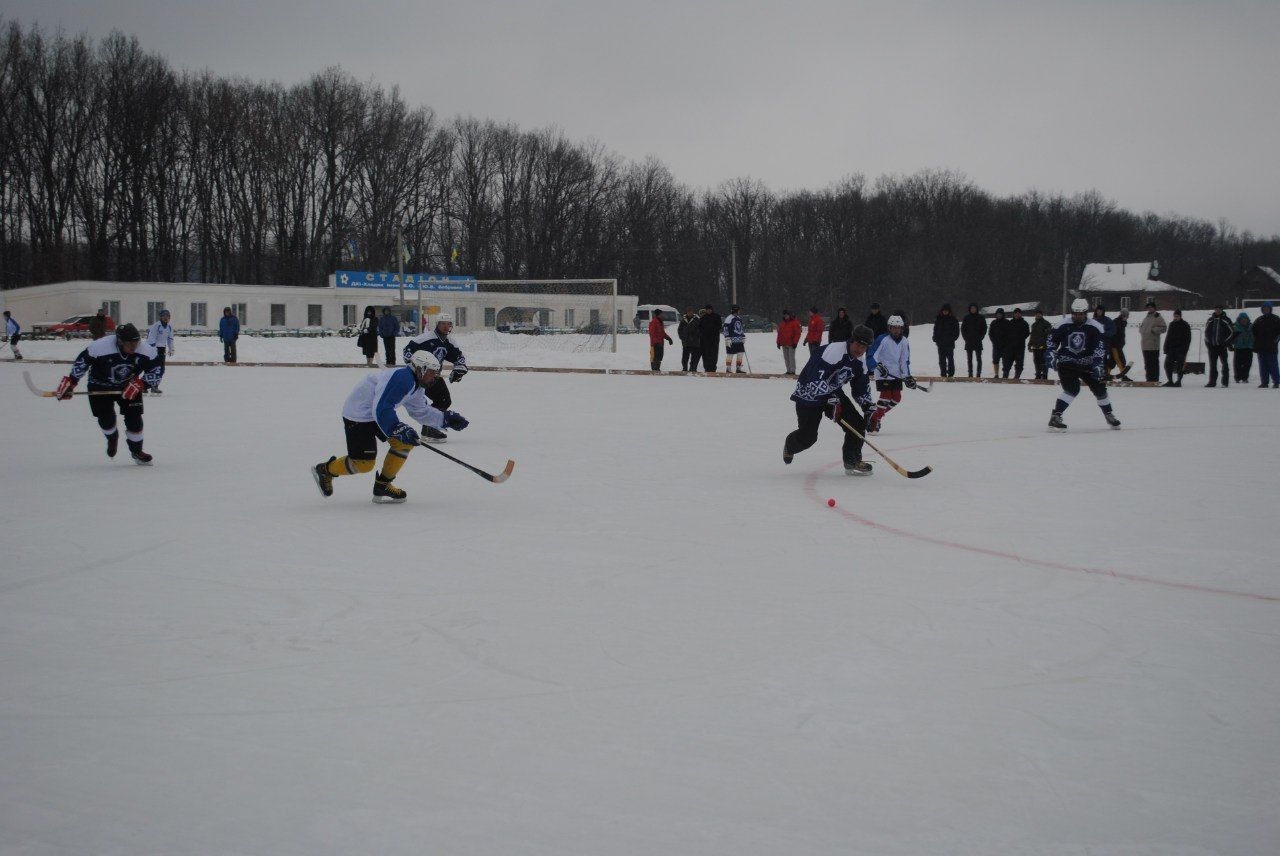
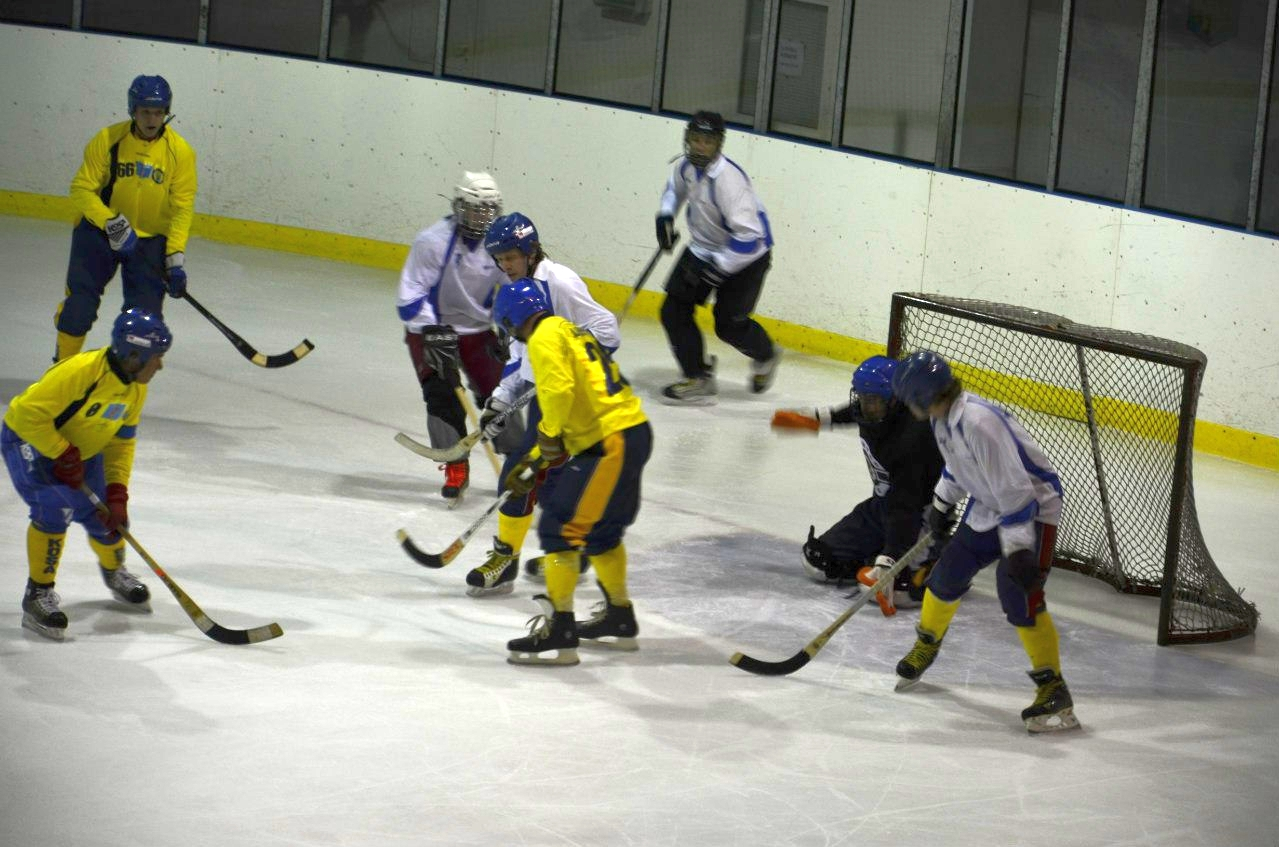
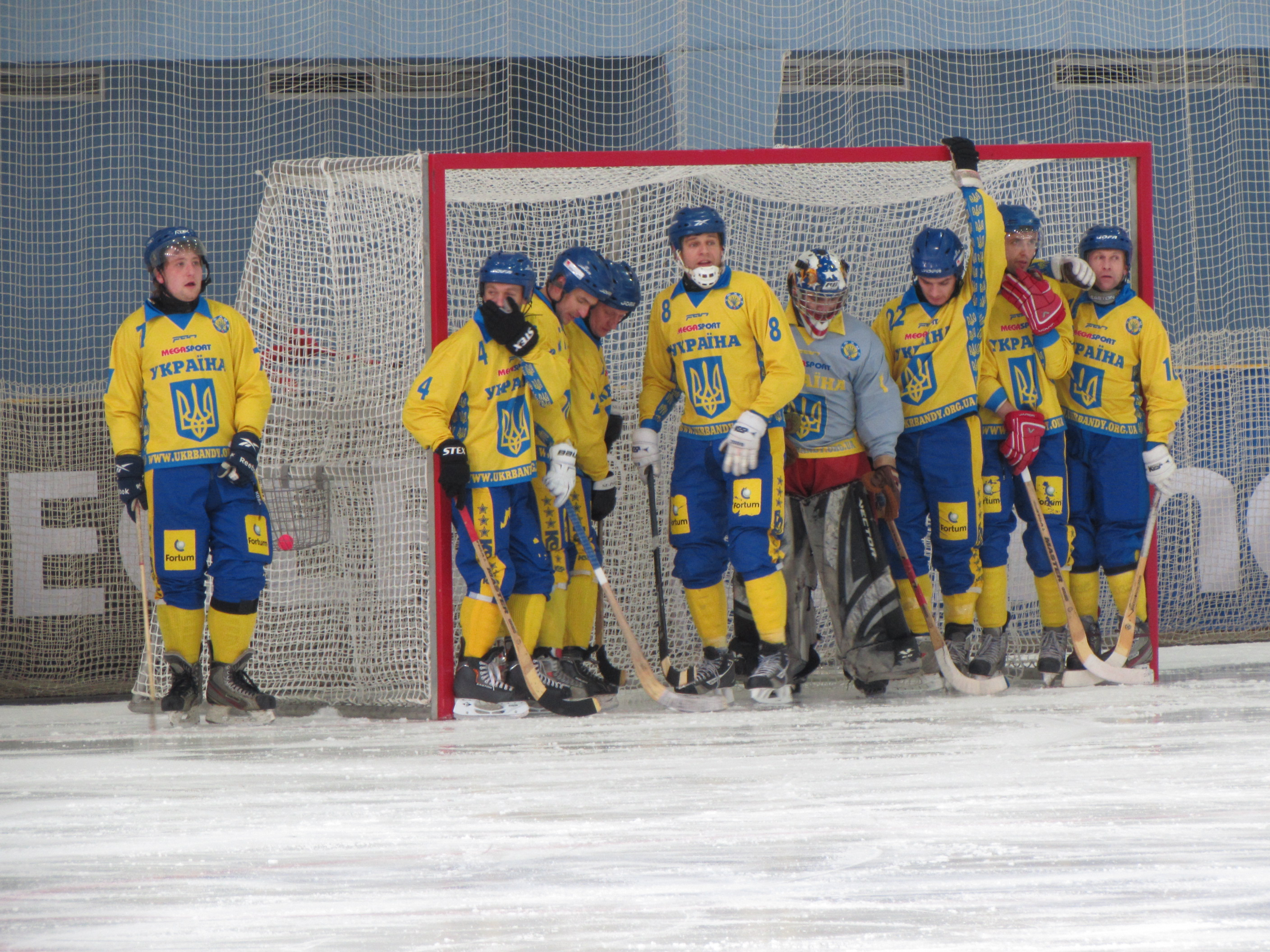
National bandy championships in 2015; Rink bandy in Dnipro, 2013; Ukraine's men's national bandy team, 2016

The champion of Mykolaiv in 1921, 1922, 1923, 1924 was the bandy team of the Миколаївський яхт-клуб, the Mykolaiv Yacht Club. In the winter season of 1921/22, bandy also appeared in Kharkiv. The first winners of the Kharkov Championship in 1923 and 1924 were the teams of O.L.S. and O.F.K. named after Balabanov, respectively. In 1924, a bandy team of railway workers appeared in the city of Lyman.

In 1922, the people of Mykolaiv and Kharkiv unsuccessfully took part in the championship of the RSFSR (on February 22, Mykolaiv lost to Moscow 0:31, and Kharkiv to Saratov 0:16). In 1924, also unsuccessfully, the Kharkiv players made their debut in the championship of the USSR (defeat against the future champion of the Moscow national team 0:13). However in 1928 during the Winter Physical Education Festival in Moscow from February 2 to 9, the Ukrainians (USSR national team) took 2nd place in the USSR championship (the highest achievement in history) losing in the match to the championship of Leningrad 0:5.

In 1927, the first women's bandy teams appeared in Kharkiv:

Interest in bandy in Kharkov grows noticeably every year. ...By the beginning of the draw, more than 30 male and 3 female teams were registered.

In the post-war years, bandy in the Ukrainian Soviet Socialist Republic gave way somewhat to ice hockey. Ukrainian teams rarely participated in the championships of the USSR and did so without much success. In particular, in the 1950s, Kharkiv "Traktor" played two seasons each in the 1st and 2nd groups, Kyiv "Bolshevik" ("Iskra") spent a season in the 1st and 2nd groups, two seasons in Lokomotiv from Dnipro played in the second group, and Shakhtar from Kadyiv and (in class "B") House of Officers from Vinnytsia, the winner of the Ukrainian SSR Cup in 1955, played one season in the second group.

In the 1960s and 1980s, "Avangard" (Budy), which also repeatedly became the champion of the Ukrainian SSR, took part in the Union championships in the second group.

Due to the 2022 Russian invasion of Ukraine, the men's and women's team had to withdraw from the World Championships. The Kharkiv rink "Saltivskyi lid", which hosted the Ukrainian Rink Bandy Cup 2021, got hit by a Russian rocket attack. Severodonetsk, the city of the first Ukrainian bandy championship and the home of the only Ukrainian bandy referee of the World Championships, Artem Zuyenko, was occupied in the summer of 2022. From September 2022, the training of bandy teams started at the "Ice Arena" in Dnipro for men, young boys and girls.

== Notable players ==
- Суздалев Юрій Васильович, Suzdalev Yuriy Vasyliovych

== See also ==
- Ukraine national bandy team
- Ukraine women's national bandy team
- List of Ukrainian bandy champions
