= Dynamo Kharkiv (bandy club) =

Bandy club based in Kharkiv, Ukraine

Dynamo Kharkiv is a bandy club based in Kharkiv, in the northeastern part of Ukraine.

Dynamo Kharkiv won the Ukrainian championship in 2015 by defeating Dnipro Dnipropetrovsk in the final by 5–0.

== Achievements ==
- UKR Championship of Ukraine
  - Champion(1): 2014/15
- UKR Cup of Ukraine'
  - Winner (2): 2014/15, 2015/16
