= Dalecarlian language =

Group of Scandinavian languages of Sweden

Dalecarlian
- dalmål
- Native to: Sweden
- Region: Dalarna County
- Ethnicity: Dalecarlians (Swedes)
- Language family: Indo-European: Germanic; North Germanic; East or West Scandinavian; Dalecarlian
- Early form: Old Norse
- Dialects: Elfdalian; Moramål; Orsamål; Våmhusmål
- Writing system: Latin (Dalecarlian alphabet); Dalecarlian runes

Language codes
- ISO 639-3: None (mis); Individual code: ovd – Elfdalian
- Glottolog: dale1238
- ELP: Dalecarlian
- Dalecarlian is classified as Definitely Endangered by the UNESCO Atlas of the World's Languages in Danger (2010)

Dalecarlian (Swedish: dalmål) is a group of North Germanic language varieties spoken in Dalarna County, Sweden. Some Dalecarlian varieties can be regarded as part of the Swedish dialect group in Gästrikland, Uppland, and northern and eastern Västmanland. Others represent a variety characteristic of a midpoint between West and East Scandinavian languages, significantly divergent from Standard Swedish. In the northernmost part of the county (i.e., the originally Norwegian parishes of Särna and Idre), a characteristic dialect reminiscent of eastern Norwegian is spoken. One usually distinguishes between the Dalecarlian Bergslagen dialects, which are spoken in south-eastern Dalarna, and Dalecarlian proper. The dialects are traditionally regarded as part of the Svealand dialect group.

Officially, they are considered Swedish dialects due to being spoken in a region where Swedish is an official language today. The Swedish government nevertheless acknowledges that the dialects have developed independently from Old Norse, and not from Swedish itself.

In everyday speech, many also refer to Dalarna regional variants of Standard Swedish as part of the Dalecarlian dialect. Linguistically speaking, however, they are more accurately described as a lexically and morphologically "national" Swedish with characteristic Dalarna intonation and prosody. In linguistics, one distinguishes between regionally different national languages and genuine dialects, and Dalecarlian as a term is used exclusively for dialects in the latter sense.

== Geographical distribution ==
Varieties of Dalecarlian are generally classified geographically as follows:

- Österdalarna dialects
  - Nedansiljan, south of the Siljan lake: sockens Boda, Rättvik, Bjursås, Ål, Siljansnäs, Leksand, Gagnef and Mockfjärd.
  - Ovansiljan, north of the Siljan lake: sockens Ore, Orsa, Våmhus, Älvdalen (Elfdalian), Mora, Venjan and Sollerön.
- Västerdalarna dialects:
  - Lower Västerdalarna: sockens Malung, Äppelbo, Järna, Nås and Floda.
  - Upper Västerdalarna: sockens Lima and Transtrand.

Floda and Mockfjärd dialects are sometimes considered a separate group, but are typically listed as subdialects.

Dalecarlian proper (especially in Älvdalen, Mora and Orsa, to some extent also in Ore, Rättvik and Leksand), as well as western Dalecarlian varieties are markedly different from Swedish, and are considered to be distinct language varieties by linguists. Elfdalian is the Dalecarlian language that best preserved their older features. It attracted interest from researchers early on because of its major divergences from others Swedish dialects. In many ways, it is very archaic and reminiscent of Old Norse, though it has in other ways distinguished itself from the Norse branch and developed special features that are seldom seen in other dialects.

Characteristic of the dialect group are its plentiful linguistic differences even between bordering varieties, often changing from village to village, or even within a single village. For other Swedish speakers, Dalecarlian varieties are virtually incomprehensible without dedicated language lessons. However, this does not apply to the Rättvik and Leksand dialects as much. They are more easily understood and can be considered to form a transitional stage between the Dalecarlian languages and a dialect of Swedish with Dalecarlian remnants. Such transitional varieties also include the Ål, Bjursås and Gagnef dialects. The Gagnef dialect is closer to western Dalecarlian varieties, which to some extent can also be regarded as transitional dialects, but which in many respects take on a more independent position, especially in the upper parishes. They may show similarities with neighbouring Norwegian dialects.

There is a quite large difference between Gagnef and the Stora Tuna dialect, which belongs to the Dalecarlian Bergslagen dialects, a relatively uniform and fairly normal Swedish dialect complex that covers the entire southern Dalarna (Stora Kopparberg, Hedemora and Västerbergslagen). The most unique within this complex are the dialects of Svärdsjö and western Bergslagen, which are approaching Hälsingemål and Western Dalecarlian proper, respectively (via Grangärde and Floda). Dalecarlian Bergslagen dialects are also spoken in the northern part of Västmanland. The Dalecarlian Bergslagen dialects are quite closely connected with the neighbouring Svealand Swedish, perhaps most with the dialects of eastern Västmanland.

== Phonology ==
As with most dialects in northern and central Sweden, the Dalecarlian dialects have retroflex consonants, which are most commonly allophones of consonants with a preceding supradental /r/ or /l/. For example, rs is often realized as /sː/ (compare Dalecarlian koss, "cross" and Swedish kors), while the cluster rn becomes /r/ in southern Dalarna, up to and including Rättvik, Leksand and Västerdalarna (compare Dalecarlian bar to Swedish barn, English bairn, or Dalecarlian björ, "bear" to Swedish björn). In Dalecarlian proper, north of Gagnef, the consonant clusters nn, rt and rd are often preserved without assimilation. The /l/ sound is not usually supradental after /i/ and /e/ except in Dalecarlian proper, where /l/ has developed in its own direction and where it can even appear as partially supradental at the beginning of words, as it does in låta.

Dalecarlian has lost the -n and -t in unstressed suffixes. For example, the Dalecarlian definitive form sola or sole ("the sun") corresponds to Swedish solen, and Dalecarlian gata ("the street") to Swedish gatan. Similarly, Dalecarlian supine form biti ("bitten") has lost the -t suffix that is still present in Swedish bitit. As with other Upper Swedish dialects, the Dalecarlian dialects often pronounce the sound /i/ in suffixes where Standard Swedish has /e/. An example of this would be Dalecarlian funnin ("found") and Swedish funnen, as well as Dalecarlian muli ("cloudy") and Swedish mulet, Dalecarlian härvil ("yarn winder") and Swedish härvel. They also retain /ɡ/ within the consonant clusters rg and lg, whereas Swedish has shifted to /j/ (Dalecarlian /varɡ/, Swedish /varj/, "wolf"). Dalecarlian also keeps long vowels in front of m in many words where Swedish does not, such as tîma (/tiːma/, Swedish timme /timːe/, "hour"), tôm (/tuːm/, Swedish tom /tum/, "empty"), and /j/ after /k/ and /ɡ/ in words such as äntja (Swedish änka, "widow") and bryddja (Swedish brygga, "bridge"). As in the northern Svealand and some Norrland dialects, /ɡ/ and /k/ have been softened to /ɕ/ or /j/ even in medial positions of certain words, such as sättjin or sättjen (Swedish säcken, "sack, bag"), botja or botje (Swedish boken, "the book") and nyttjil (Swedish nyckel, "key"). These traits characterise all Dalecarlian dialects.

The use of open and close /a/ is especially characteristic of the phonology of Lower and Upper Dalarna dialects, with the exception of Dalecarlian proper. In that respect, the dialects are significantly different from standard Swedish. The open /a/ can occur as long, while the close /a/ appears as short. For example, hara (Swedish hare, "hare") features an open /a/ in the first, and a close /a/ in the second syllable. The words katt, bakka, vagn are pronounced with a closed, and skabb, kalv with an open /a/. The open /o/ sound is often replaced by a sound between /o/ and /ø/. The u sound is similar to the Norwegian /ʉ/. The sounds ä and e are well separated. Low-pitched vowels often have a quality reminiscent of /ɛ/. Among the most interesting features of Dalecarlian proper (the dialects of Älvdalen, Mora and Orsa) is that they still largely retain nasal vowels as they previously appeared in all Nordic dialects. Furthermore, the long /iː/, /yː/ and /uː/ have fractured into diphthongs, usually to /ai/, /oy/ and /au/, such as in ais (Swedish is, "ice"), knåyta (Swedish knyta, "to tie"), aute (Swedish ute "out"). The consonant v is pronounced like the English /w/. The standard Swedish l is usually omitted in front of /g/, /k/, /p/ and /v/, for example in kåv (Swedish kalv, "calf") and fok (Swedish folk, "people"). Initial h is omitted in the Älvdalen, Orsa and Mora dialects, as well as in Rättvik and parts of Leksand, such as in and (Swedish hand, "hand"). However, many words have gained an initial /h/, such as häven, hälsklig or hägde. These features are shared with the older Uppland dialects.

A pair of Nordic diphthongs is still present in the western dialects of Lima and Transtrand. The diphthong /au/, which shifted to /œ/ in Swedish, is retained in these dialects as ôu, for example dôu (Swedish död, "death"). The old Swedish diphthongs ei and öy (which in Swedish became e and ö respectively) are pronounced as äi (for example skäi, Swedish sked, "spoon" and häi, Swedish hö, "hay").
