= Västermyckeläng =

- Location within Dalarna Location within Sweden
- Coordinates: 61°12′37″N 14°02′05″E
- Country: Sweden
- Province: Dalarna
- County: Dalarna County
- Municipality: Älvdalen Municipality

Area
  - Total: 0.85 km^{2} (0.33 sq mi)

Population (31 December 2010)
  - Total: 279
  - Density: 329/km^{2} (850/sq mi)
- Time zone: UTC+1 (CET)
  - Summer (DST): UTC+2 (CEST)

Västermyckeläng (Elfdalian: Westermykklaingg) is a locality situated in Älvdalen Municipality, Dalarna County, Sweden, with 279 inhabitants in 2010.

The name comes from the location of the village and its meadows (äng) on the west (väster) side of Myckeln. Myckeln was the local name of Österdal River; it is now the lake that is the reservoir for the dam in Väsa. Locally the village is called Västäng.
