= Brunnsberg =

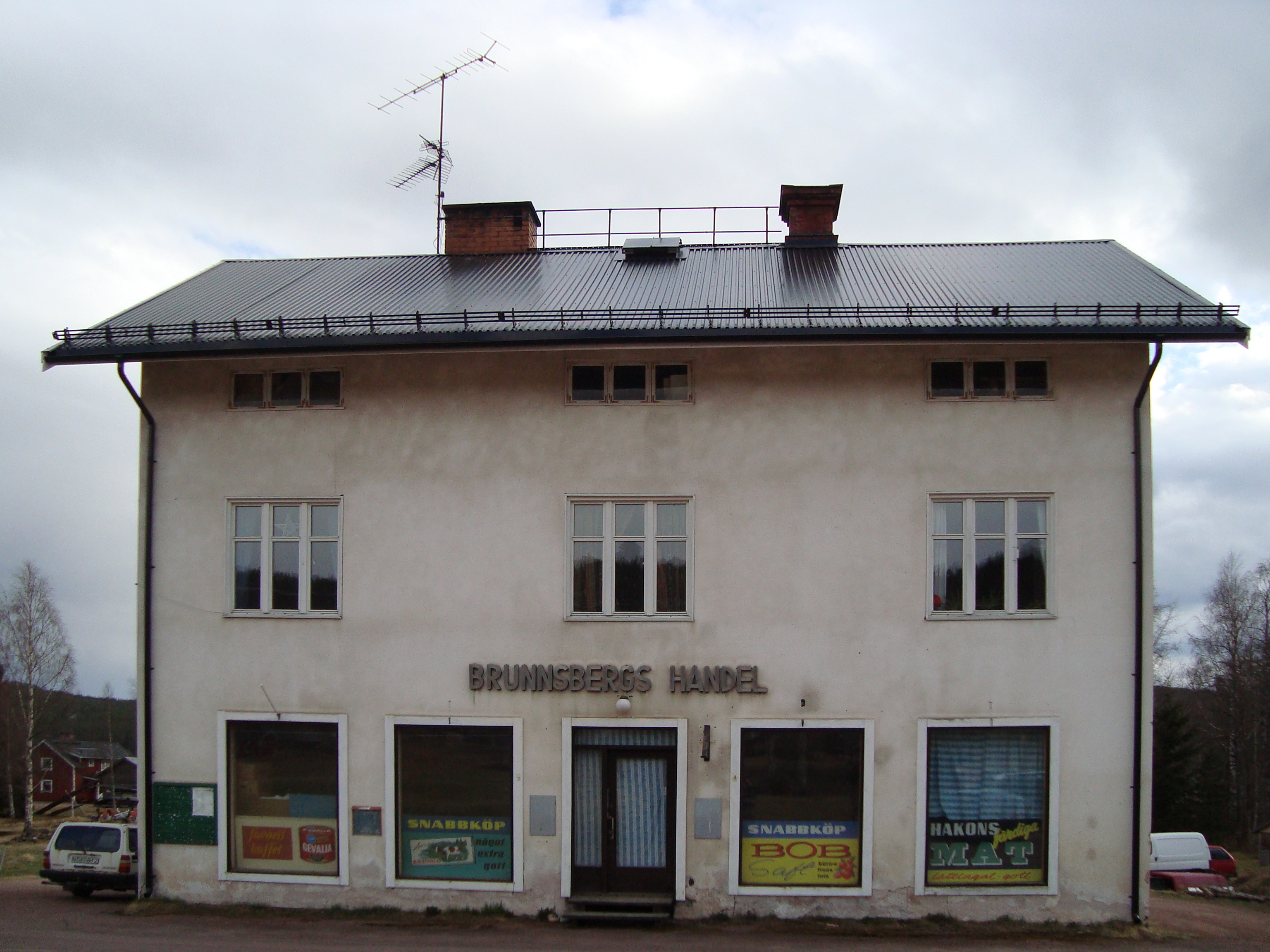
- An old store in Brunnsberg

- Location within Dalarna Location within Sweden
- Coordinates: 61°17′N 13°55′E
- Country: Sweden
- Province: Dalarna
- County: Dalarna County
- Municipality: Älvdalen Municipality

Area
  - Total: 1.21 km^{2} (0.47 sq mi)

Population (31 December 2010)
  - Total: 222
  - Density: 184/km^{2} (480/sq mi)
- Time zone: UTC+1 (CET)
  - Summer (DST): UTC+2 (CEST)
- Climate: Dfc

Brunnsberg (Elfdalian: Brunnsbjärr) is a locality situated in Älvdalen Municipality, Dalarna County, Sweden with 222 inhabitants in 2010.
