= Rot, Sweden =

Rot
- Location within Dalarna Location within Sweden
- Coordinates: 61°15′21″N 14°02′31″E
- Country: Sweden
- Province: Dalarna
- County: Dalarna County
- Municipality: Älvdalen Municipality

Area
  - Total: 2.65 km^{2} (1.02 sq mi)

Population (31 December 2010)
  - Total: 695
  - Density: 262/km^{2} (680/sq mi)
- Time zone: UTC+1 (CET)
  - Summer (DST): UTC+2 (CEST)

Rot (Elfdalian: Ruot) is a locality situated in Älvdalen Municipality, Dalarna County, Sweden with 695 inhabitants in 2010.
