= Falu River =

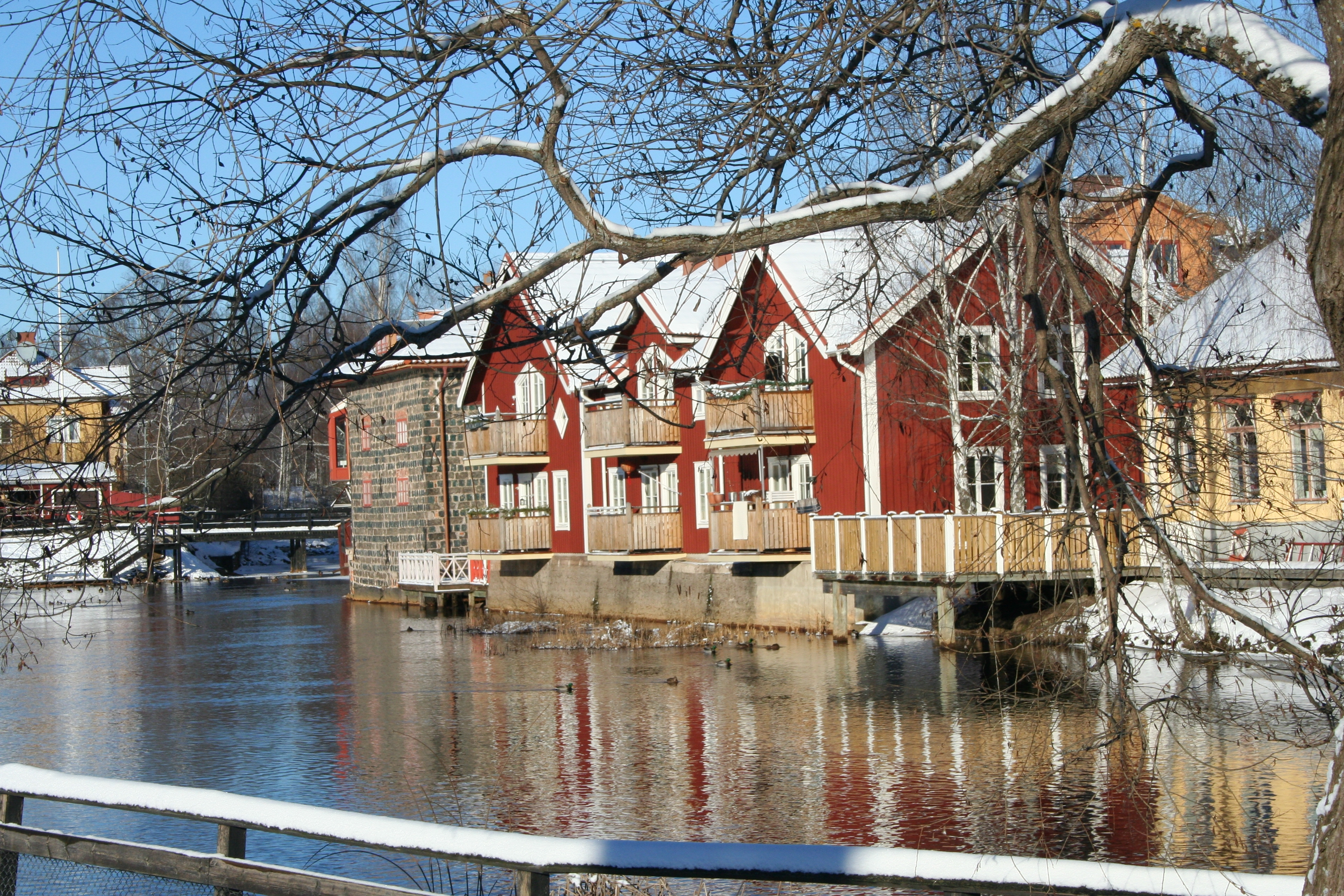
- Native name: Faluån (Swedish)

Location
- Country: Sweden
- County: Dalarna

Physical characteristics
- Mouth: Runn
  - coordinates: 60°36′55″N 15°37′09″E
- Length: 4 km (2.5 mi)

Falu River (Swedish: Faluån) is a river in Sweden. It runs from lake Varpan to lake Runn and passes through the town of Falun.

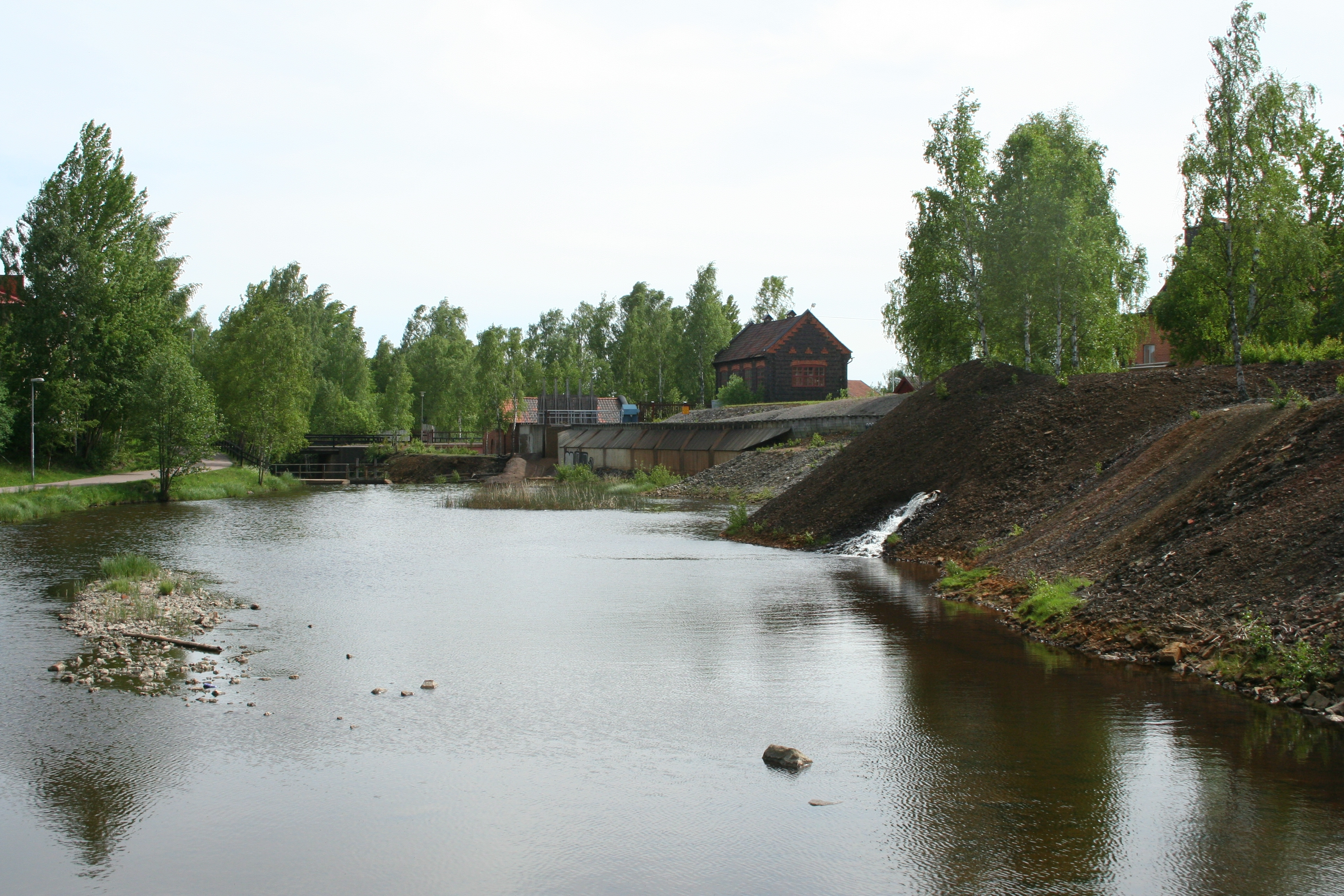

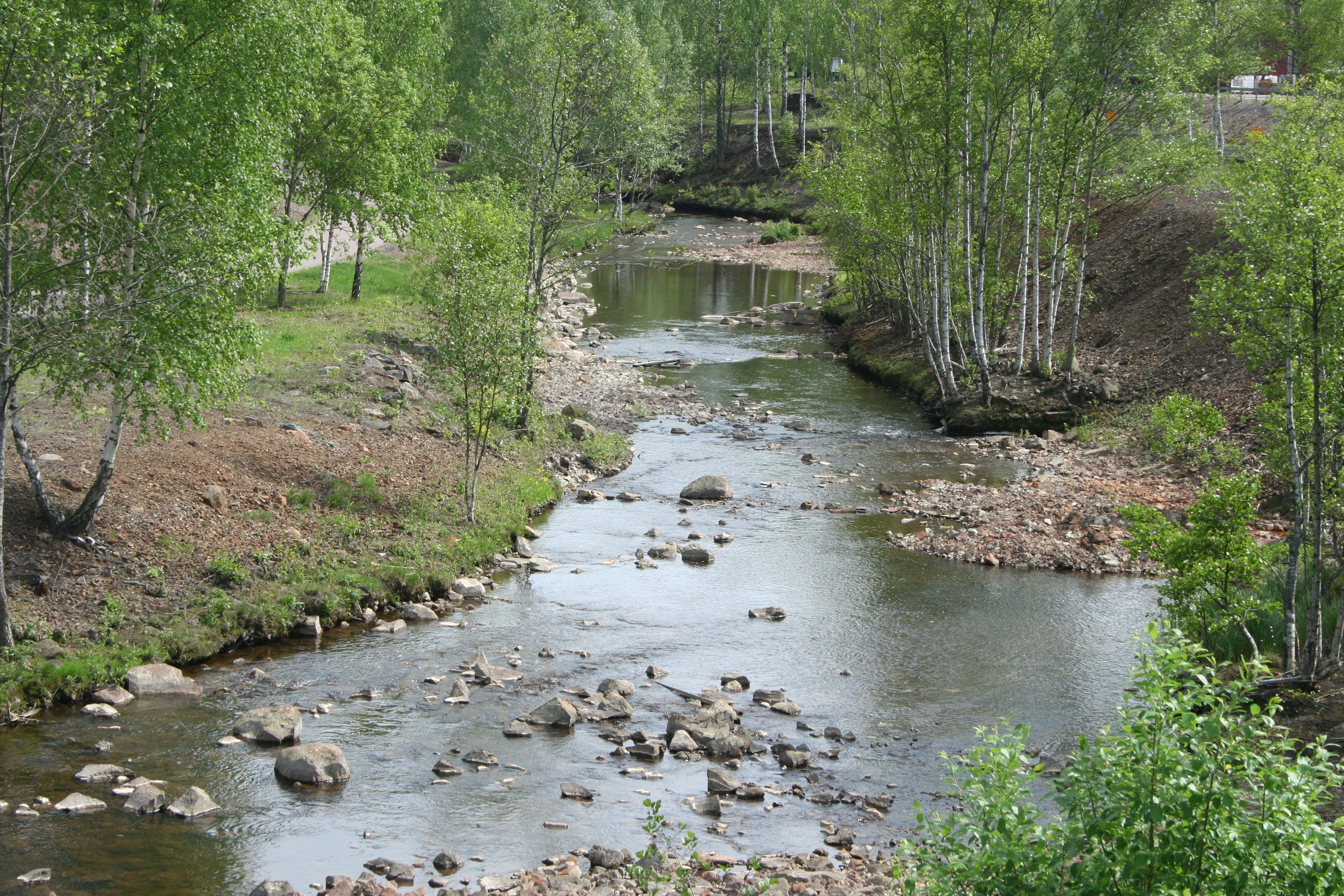

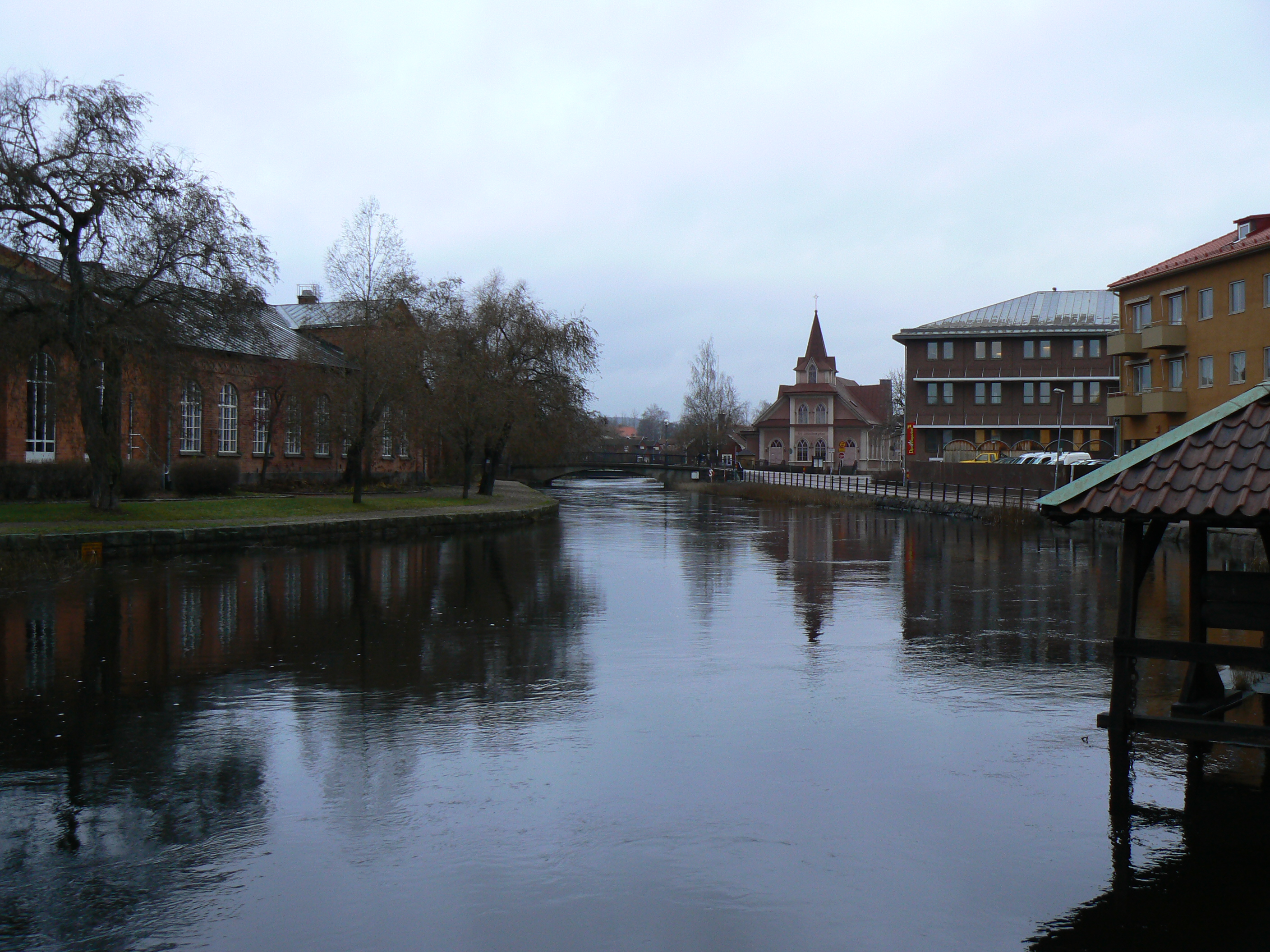
