= Idre =

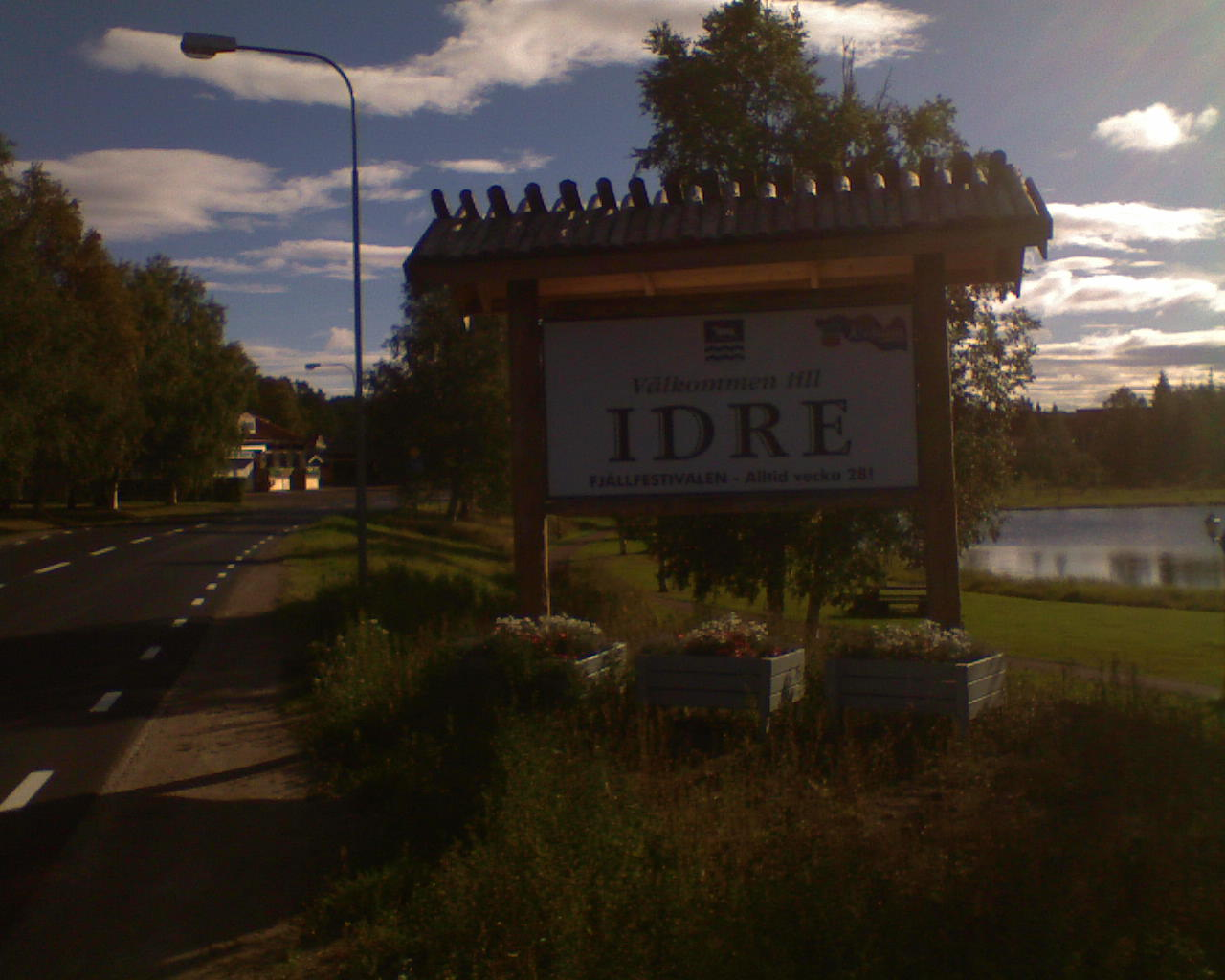
- Welcome sign

- Location within Dalarna Location within Sweden
- Coordinates: 61°51′24″N 12°43′00″E
- Country: Sweden
- Province: Dalarna
- County: Dalarna County
- Municipality: Älvdalen Municipality

Area
  - Total: 1.80 km^{2} (0.69 sq mi)

Population (31 December 2010)
  - Total: 794
  - Density: 440/km^{2} (1,100/sq mi)
- Time zone: UTC+1 (CET)
  - Summer (DST): UTC+2 (CEST)

Idre is a locality and ski resort situated in Älvdalen Municipality, Dalarna County, Sweden with 794 inhabitants in 2010. It was also a historical parish and former municipality.

== History ==
The two parishes Särna and Idre were originally part of Norway but were occupied by an expedition of Swedish peasants from Älvdalen in 1644. The 1645 Treaty of Brömsebro was ambiguous regarding the status of the parishes, but when the exact path of the border was to be decided in 1751 Norway accepted a border west of Idre and Särna.

In 1971 the three municipalities Särna, Idre (which itself had been split off from Särna in 1916) and Älvdalen were amalgamated to form the present municipality of Älvdalen, durning 1971 municipality reform.

== Geography ==
Idre is located between the upper course of Österdal river, and in the foothills of the Scandinavian mountain range. Several of Dalarna's highest peak are located nearby, including Storvätteshågna, the highest mountain in both Svealand and Dalarna. Fulufjället National Park, lies 35km southwest of Idre.

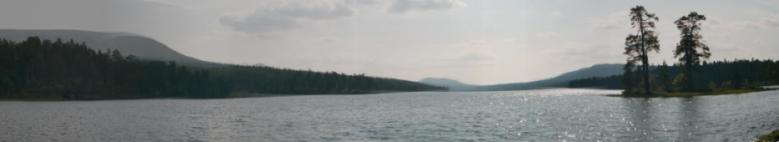
Österdal river near Idre.

== Climate ==
Idre has a subarctic climate (Dfc).

Climate data for Idre Fjäll A 1991-2020 (869m)
Month	Jan	Feb	Mar	Apr	May	Jun	Jul	Aug	Sep	Oct	Nov	Dec	Year
Mean daily maximum °C (°F)	−4.4 (24.1)	−4.3 (24.3)	−1.7 (28.9)	2.9 (37.2)	9.0 (48.2)	14.0 (57.2)	16.7 (62.1)	14.9 (58.8)	9.9 (49.8)	3.2 (37.8)	−1.3 (29.7)	−3.5 (25.7)	4.6 (40.3)
Daily mean °C (°F)	−6.5 (20.3)	−6.8 (19.8)	−4.6 (23.7)	−0.3 (31.5)	4.8 (40.6)	9.3 (48.7)	12.2 (54.0)	10.8 (51.4)	6.5 (43.7)	0.9 (33.6)	−3.2 (26.2)	−5.5 (22.1)	1.5 (34.6)
Mean daily minimum °C (°F)	−8.8 (16.2)	−9.2 (15.4)	−7.0 (19.4)	−3.0 (26.6)	1.3 (34.3)	5.7 (42.3)	8.8 (47.8)	7.9 (46.2)	4.0 (39.2)	−0.8 (30.6)	−5.2 (22.6)	−7.7 (18.1)	−1.2 (29.9)
Source: NOAA

== See also ==
- Scandinavian Mountains Airport
