= Älvdal =

Älvdal can mean:

- Älvdal Hundred, a district of Värmland in Sweden
- Älvdalen Municipality, a municipality of Dalarna County in Sweden
- Älvdalen Court District, a district of Dalarna in Sweden
