= Åsen, Sweden =

Åsen, Älvdalen
- Location within Dalarna Location within Sweden
- Coordinates: 61°16′29″N 13°49′27″E
- Country: Sweden
- Province: Dalarna
- County: Dalarna County
- Municipality: Älvdalen Municipality

Area
  - Total: 1.03 km^{2} (0.40 sq mi)

Population (31 December 2010)
  - Total: 246
  - Density: 238/km^{2} (620/sq mi)
- Time zone: UTC+1 (CET)
  - Summer (DST): UTC+2 (CEST)
- Climate: Dfc

Åsen (Elfdalian: Ǫsär or Ǫsbynn) is a locality situated in Älvdalen Municipality, Dalarna County, Sweden with 246 inhabitants in 2010.
