= Dalecarlian alphabet =

Alphabet of the Övdalian language of Sweden

The Dalecarlian alphabet consists of 32 letters, 25 derived from the Swedish alphabet, and seven additional letters: vowels with an ogonek diacritic, denoting nasality: (Ąą, Ęę, Įį, Ųų, Y̨y̨, and Ą̊ą̊) as well as the consonant Ðð (eð), denoting voiced dental fricative, as 'th' in 'father'. The letters Cc, Qq, Xx and Zz are only used in names and foreign words. The alphabet is used for Elfdalian and for other Dalecarlian dialects. The language up until recently and on a small scale today is written with Dalecarlian runes.

== Description ==
Elfdalian alphabet
Upper case	A	Ą	B	D	Ð	E	Ę	F	G	H	I	Į	J	K	L	M	N	O	P	R	S	T	U	Ų	V	W	Y	Y̨	Å	Ą̊	Ä	Ö
Lower case	a	ą	b	d	ð	e	ę	f	g	h	i	į	j	k	l	m	n	o	p	r	s	t	u	ų	v	w	y	y̨	å	ą̊	ä	ö

== See also ==
- Old Norse alphabet
- Dalecarlian runes
