= Väsa =

Village in Sweden

Väsa Wesa
- Village
- Location within Dalarna Location within Sweden
- Coordinates: 61°11′19″N 14°04′03″E
- Country: Sweden
- County: Dalarna
- Municipality: Älvdalen

Väsa (Elfdalian: Wesa) is a small village, about 5 km south from the Älvdalen Municipality in Dalarna, Sweden. Wäsabergen is a ski slope to the south of Väsa.
