= Evertsberg =

- Location within Dalarna Location within Sweden
- Coordinates: 61°08′N 13°58′E
- Country: Sweden
- Province: Dalarna
- County: Dalarna County
- Municipality: Älvdalen Municipality

Area
  - Total: 1.70 km^{2} (0.66 sq mi)

Population (31 December 2010)
  - Total: 267
  - Density: 158/km^{2} (410/sq mi)
- Time zone: UTC+1 (CET)
  - Summer (DST): UTC+2 (CEST)

Evertsberg (Elfdalian: Äväsbjärr or Evesbjär) is a locality situated in Älvdalen Municipality, Dalarna County, Sweden with 267 inhabitants in 2010.
