= Kungsgårdssjön (Dalarna) =

- Location within Dalarna Location within Sweden
- Location: Dalarna, Sweden
- Coordinates: 60.136°N 16.304°E
- Type: lake

Kungsgårdssjön is a lake located in the province of Dalarna, Sweden. The lake has an area of 1.25 km^{2}.
