= Kopparberg and Aspeboda Court District =

Kopparberg and Aspeboda Court District was a tithing in Dalarna, Kopparbergs län.

The tithing was formed in 1780 from the Kopparberg tithing and ceased in 1889 when the activities were transferred to Falu District Court’s northern tithing. The tithing belonged to Kopparbergslagen and Näsgårds läns district court (until 1798 called Kopparbergslagens district court) and from 1858 to Falun District Court.

The tithing contained the parishes of Stora Kopparberg and Aspeboda.
