= Töfsingdalen National Park =

National park in Sweden

- IUCN category II (national park)
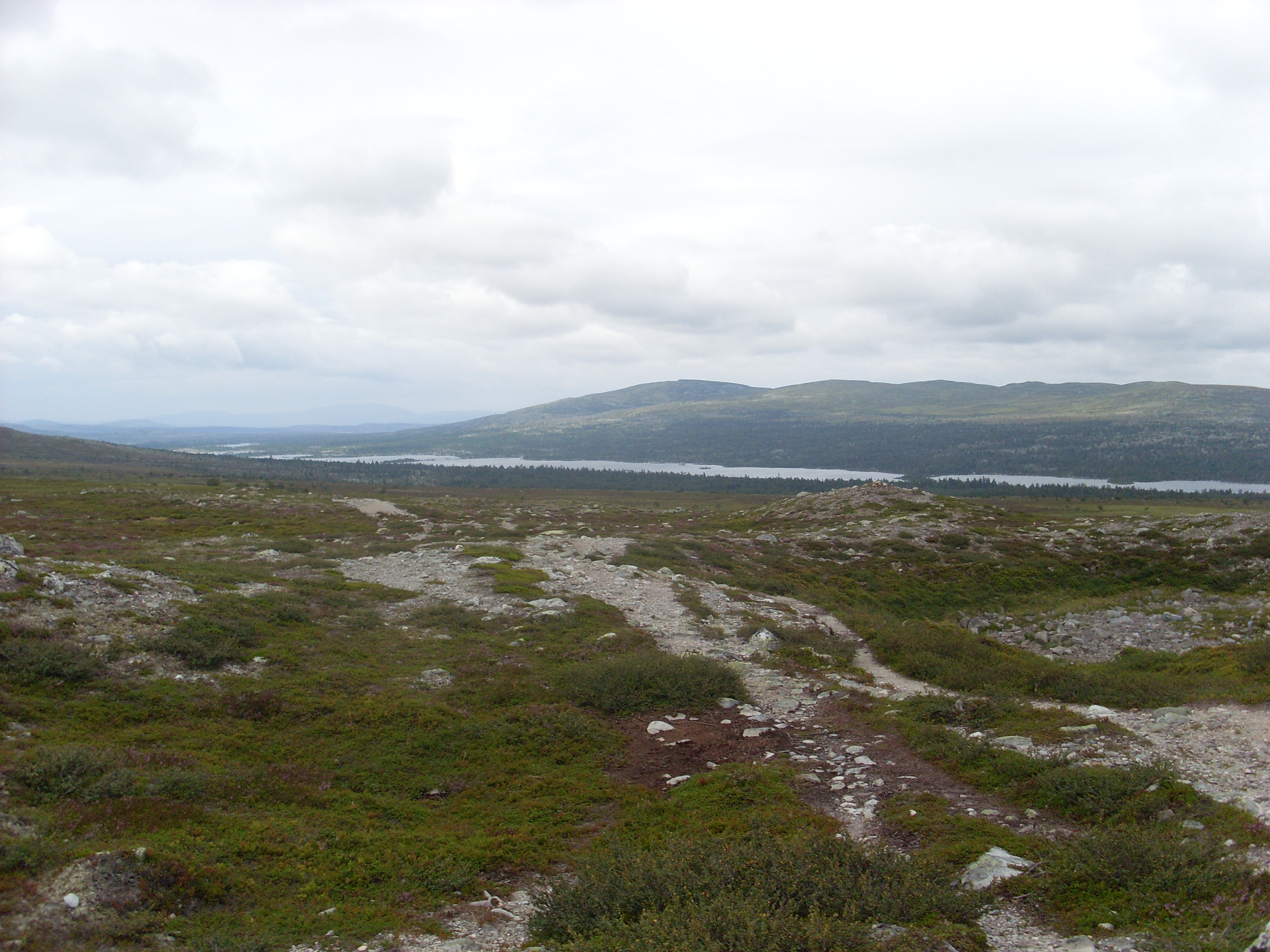
- Overview over Lake Hälvnigen in Töfsingdalen
- Interactive map of Töfsingdalen National Park
- Location: Dalarna County, Sweden
- Coordinates: 62°10′N 12°26′E
- Area: 16.15 km^{2} (6.24 sq mi)
- Established: 1930
- Governing body: Naturvårdsverket

Töfsingdalen (literally The Töfsing Valley) is a Swedish national park in Älvdalen Municipality, Dalarna County.

National parks of Sweden (clickable map)
