= Johan Erik Forsström =

Swedish naturalist

Johan Erik Forsström (1775–1824), a Swedish pastor and naturalist, came from the province of Dalarna. The plant genus Forsstroemia from the family Leptodontaceae is named after him.

He studied at the University of Uppsala, where one of his instructors was the naturalist Carl Peter Thunberg (1743–1828). In 1800, he accompanied Göran Wahlenberg (1780–1851) on an expedition through Fennoscandia, where he performed entomological and botanical investigations. On the trip he kept a journal, and in 1917 Nils Ahnlund published details of the expedition in a book titled I Norrlandsstäder och Lapplandsbygd År 1800. Johan Erik Forsströms dagbok öfver resan i Norrland och Finnmarken 1800 och i Roslagen 1801.

From 1802 until 1815, Forsström served as a government preacher, pastor and civil engineer in Saint Barthélemy in the Leeward Islands, where he also worked collecting botanical specimens. Afterwards he returned to Sweden, where he died in 1824 at Munktorp, located near the town of Köping.
