= Ärnäs, Älvdalen Municipality =

Village in Sweden

Coordinates: 61°21′N 13°17′E

Ärnäs (also, Arnäs) is a village adjacent to Kullhån, Älvdalen Municipality, Dalarna County, Sweden.
