= Runn =

Lake in Dalarna, Sweden

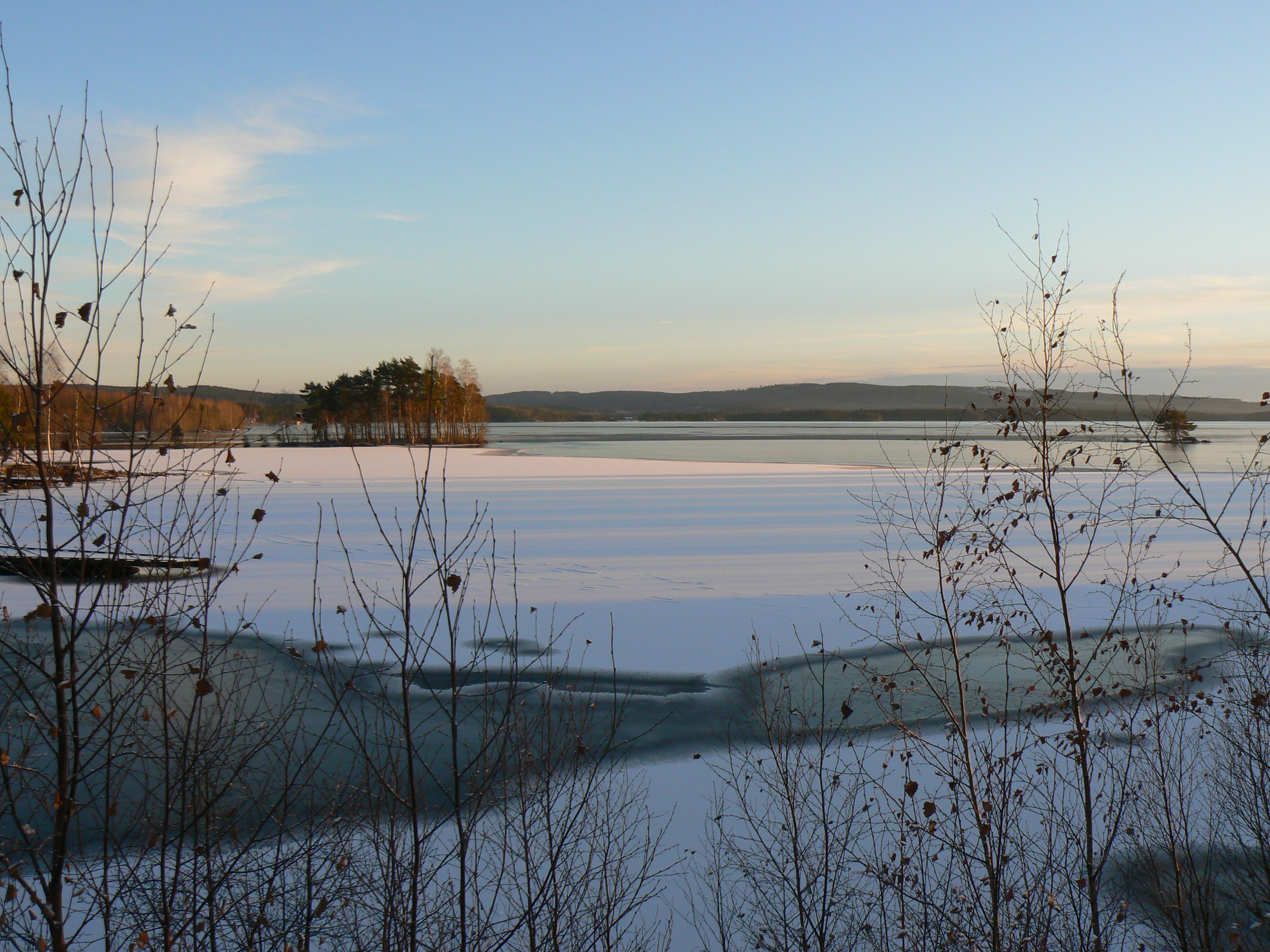
- January view from Falun

- Location within Dalarna Location within Sweden
- Coordinates: 60°32′N 15°41′E
- Primary outflows: Dalälven
- Basin countries: Sweden
- Surface area: 68 km^{2} (26 sq mi)
- Average depth: 8.3 m (27 ft)
- Max. depth: 32 m (105 ft)
- Surface elevation: 107 m (351 ft)
- Islands: > 50
- Settlements: Falun, Borlänge

Runn, is a lake in Dalarna in central Sweden, between the cities of Falun and Borlänge.

Runn has many islands and is popular for recreational boating in the summer. Runn is the second largest lake in Dalarna, after Siljan.

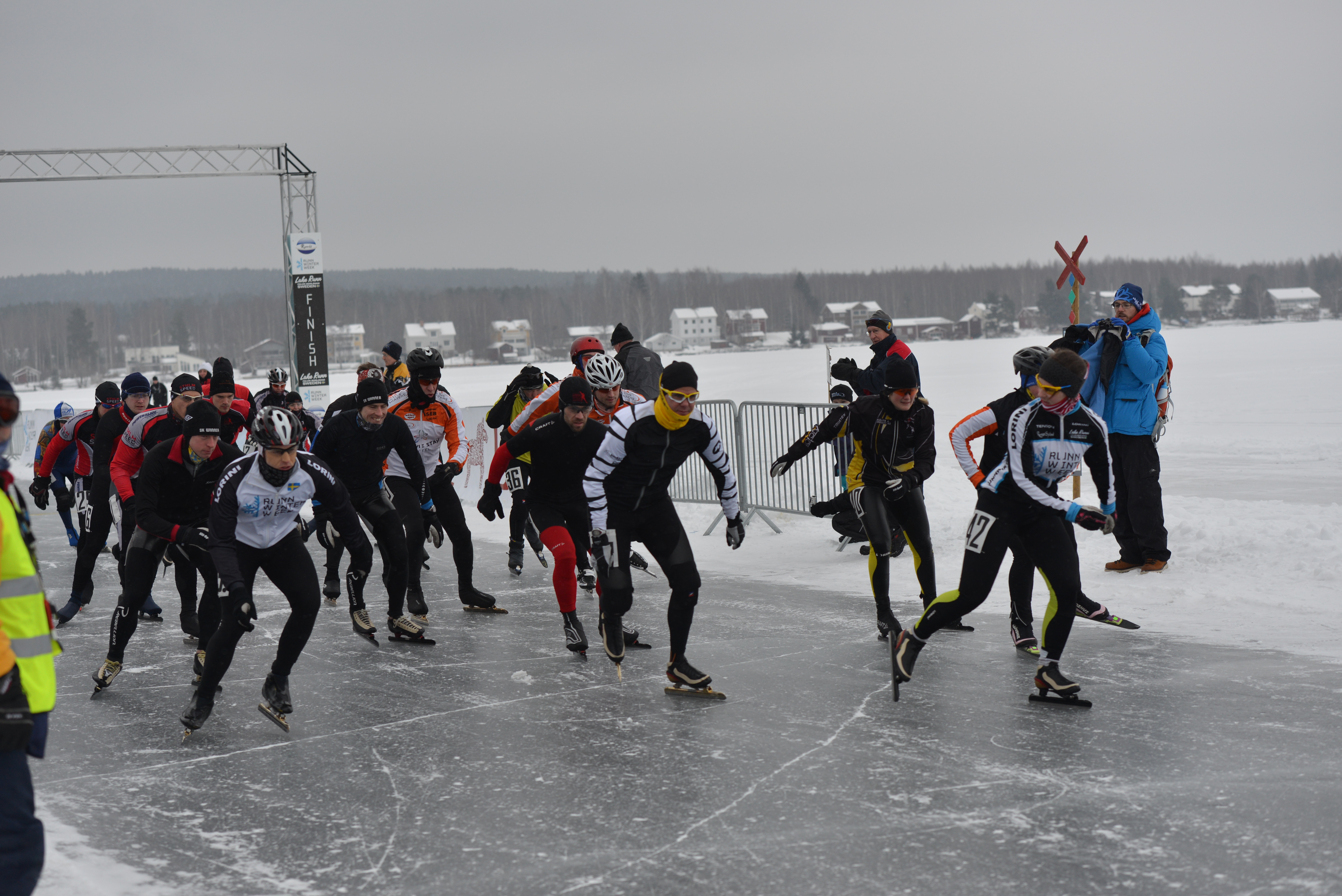
Marathon speed skating race on Runn in January 2013

In winter, Runn is popular for Tour skating and over 30 km of skating trails are plowed on the ice. Every February, 'Runn Winter Week' is held with many ice skating activities, including marathon Speed skating competitions.
