= Särna =

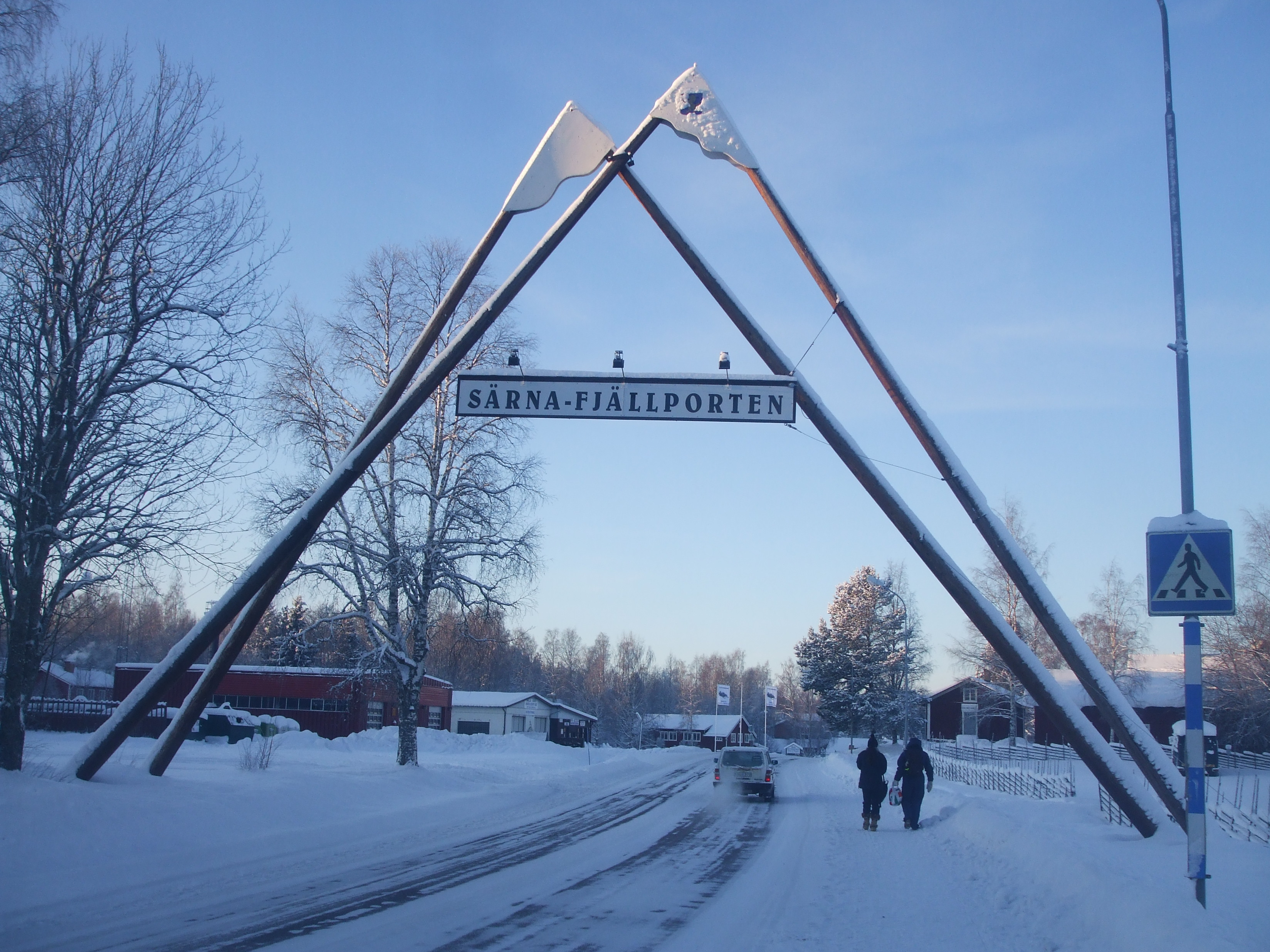
- The road entering Särna

- Location within Dalarna Location within Sweden
- Coordinates: 61°41′N 13°08′E
- Country: Sweden
- Province: Dalarna
- County: Dalarna County
- Municipality: Älvdalen Municipality

Area
  - Total: 3.64 km^{2} (1.41 sq mi)

Population (31 December 2010)
  - Total: 719
  - Density: 197/km^{2} (510/sq mi)
- Time zone: UTC+1 (CET)
  - Summer (DST): UTC+2 (CEST)

Särna is a locality situated in Älvdalen Municipality, Dalarna County, Sweden with 719 inhabitants in 2010.

== History ==
The two parishes Särna and Idre were originally part of Norway but were occupied by an expedition of Swedish peasants from Älvdalen in 1644. The 1645 Treaty of Brömsebro was ambiguous regarding the status of the parishes, but when the exact path of the border was to be decided in 1751, Norway accepted a border west of Idre and Särna.

During the German occupation of Norway 1940-45 Särna was considered the only safe escape to Sweden because its police was the only reliable anti-Nazi police along the border.

In 1971, the three municipalities Särna, Idre (which itself had been split off from Särna in 1916) and Älvdalen were amalgamated to form the present municipality of Älvdalen.

== Riksdag elections ==
Year	%	Votes	V	S	MP	C	L	KD	M	SD	NyD	Left	Right
1973	75.6	856	7.4	52.2		25.2	9.2	2.1	3.5			59.6	38.0
1976	81.7	923	5.7	54.4		24.1	8.7	2.2	4.6			60.1	37.3
1979	80.4	916	4.1	57.5		21.1	7.5	2.3	7.4			61.7	36.0
1982	83.7	949	4.3	59.2	0.4	19.8	4.6	1.7	10.1			63.3	34.6
1985	75.1	832	5.0	56.1	1.6	18.3	8.3		10.5			61.2	37.0
1988	75.6	790	6.3	60.6	3.8	13.7	6.5	2.3	6.8			70.8	27.0
1991	76.4	811	6.9	53.9	2.1	12.3	5.4	4.1	8.6		6.3	60.8	30.5
1994	79.9	840	7.5	62.1	3.0	11.1	3.9	1.9	8.6		1.5	72.6	25.5
1998	64.1	626	16.6	52.7	3.5	8.0	2.6	5.6	10.1			72.8	26.2
2002	66.4	630	8.6	56.5	4.3	9.2	6.0	5.6	7.3	0.2		69.4	28.1
2006	72.5	646	6.2	47.8	1.7	10.1	3.3	3.4	16.1	3.7		55.7	32.8
2010	75.7	655	5.5	48.4	1.4	8.7	1.5	2.6	19.7	10.5		55.3	32.5
2014	82.2	649	4.9	43.3	0.6	7.4	1.2	2.6	12.3	25.1		48.8	23.6
2018	81.0	621	4.8	30.3	0.8	7.2	2.4	6.3	9.0	36.9		43.2	54.6

== Climate ==
Särna has a continentally-influenced subarctic climate with mild summers and cold winters. The cold extremes in winter are associated with the high altitude and being the Scandinavian spot farthest from the sea. This in turn also contributes to high diurnal temperature variation and significant frost has been recorded in all months of the year.

Climate data for Särna (2002–2018 averages; precipitation 1961–1990; extremes since 1901)
Month	Jan	Feb	Mar	Apr	May	Jun	Jul	Aug	Sep	Oct	Nov	Dec	Year
Record high °C (°F)	9.1 (48.4)	9.4 (48.9)	14.6 (58.3)	20.6 (69.1)	27.8 (82.0)	33.0 (91.4)	32.5 (90.5)	31.9 (89.4)	26.2 (79.2)	19.8 (67.6)	12.2 (54.0)	8.8 (47.8)	33.0 (91.4)
Mean maximum °C (°F)	3.4 (38.1)	4.3 (39.7)	9.4 (48.9)	14.9 (58.8)	22.7 (72.9)	25.6 (78.1)	27.3 (81.1)	25.1 (77.2)	20.2 (68.4)	13.6 (56.5)	7.4 (45.3)	4.2 (39.6)	28.5 (83.3)
Mean daily maximum °C (°F)	−5.6 (21.9)	−3.3 (26.1)	2.2 (36.0)	7.9 (46.2)	13.9 (57.0)	18.2 (64.8)	21.1 (70.0)	18.7 (65.7)	13.9 (57.0)	6.3 (43.3)	0.2 (32.4)	−4.2 (24.4)	7.4 (45.4)
Daily mean °C (°F)	−10.7 (12.7)	−8.9 (16.0)	−4.2 (24.4)	2.1 (35.8)	8.0 (46.4)	12.2 (54.0)	15.2 (59.4)	13.3 (55.9)	9.0 (48.2)	2.4 (36.3)	−3.3 (26.1)	−8.8 (16.2)	2.2 (35.9)
Mean daily minimum °C (°F)	−15.7 (3.7)	−14.4 (6.1)	−10.6 (12.9)	−3.7 (25.3)	2.0 (35.6)	6.1 (43.0)	9.3 (48.7)	7.8 (46.0)	4.0 (39.2)	−1.6 (29.1)	−6.8 (19.8)	−13.4 (7.9)	−3.1 (26.4)
Mean minimum °C (°F)	−31.2 (−24.2)	−30.8 (−23.4)	−25.7 (−14.3)	−13.0 (8.6)	−5.0 (23.0)	−0.8 (30.6)	2.3 (36.1)	0.3 (32.5)	−3.0 (26.6)	−12.3 (9.9)	−18.8 (−1.8)	−27.5 (−17.5)	−34.5 (−30.1)
Record low °C (°F)	−46.0 (−50.8)	−41.2 (−42.2)	−37.6 (−35.7)	−30.0 (−22.0)	−14.0 (6.8)	−6.2 (20.8)	−4.0 (24.8)	−4.0 (24.8)	−10.0 (14.0)	−25.0 (−13.0)	−35.6 (−32.1)	−42.5 (−44.5)	−46.0 (−50.8)
Average precipitation mm (inches)	43.3 (1.70)	30.4 (1.20)	21.6 (0.85)	26.6 (1.05)	62.4 (2.46)	68.9 (2.71)	80.8 (3.18)	97.5 (3.84)	55.5 (2.19)	52.9 (2.08)	47.7 (1.88)	38.5 (1.52)	626.1 (24.66)
Source 1: SMHI Open Data
Source 2: SMHI climate data 2002–2018

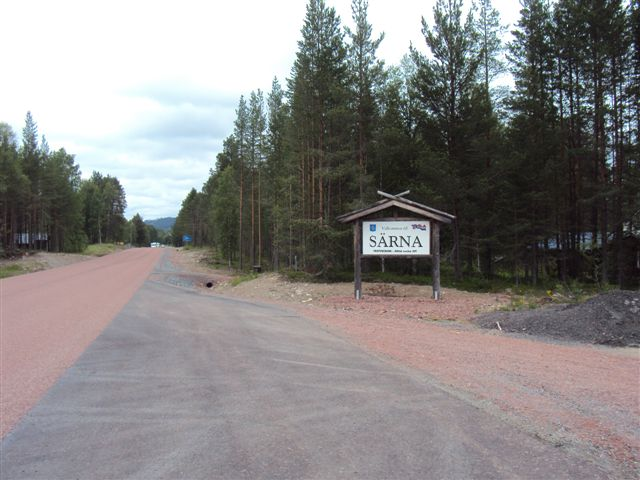
Särna

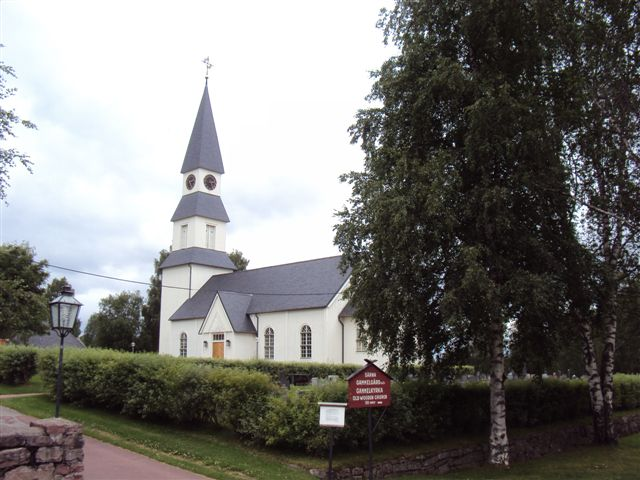
Särna church
