= Varpan =

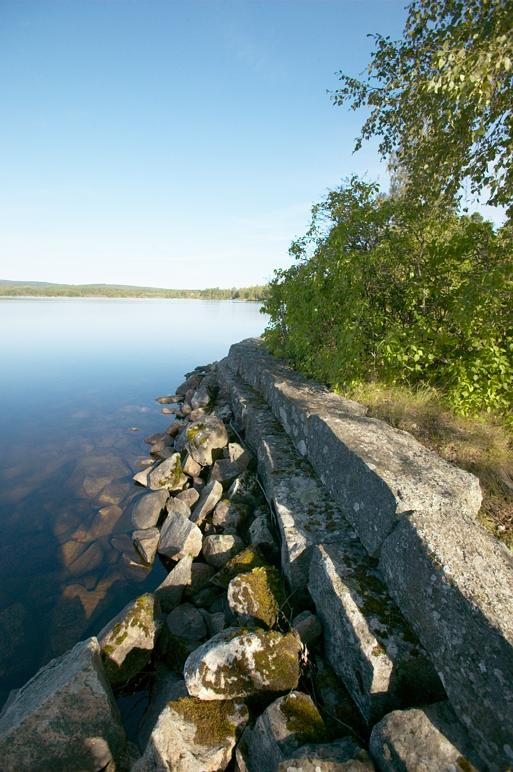

- Location within Dalarna Location within Sweden
- Location: Sweden
- Coordinates: 60°39′N 15°36′E
- Type: lake
- Surface elevation: 115 metres (377 ft)

Varpan is a lake just north of Falun in central Sweden; its surface is approximately 115 metres (377 ft) above sea level. Varpan features a 8.5 miles (13.7 km) bicycle trail loop which is open year-round.
