= Älvdalen Municipality =

Älvdalen Municipality: Älvdalens kommun (Swedish); Övdalskommun / Kommun Övdaln (Elfdalian)
- Municipality
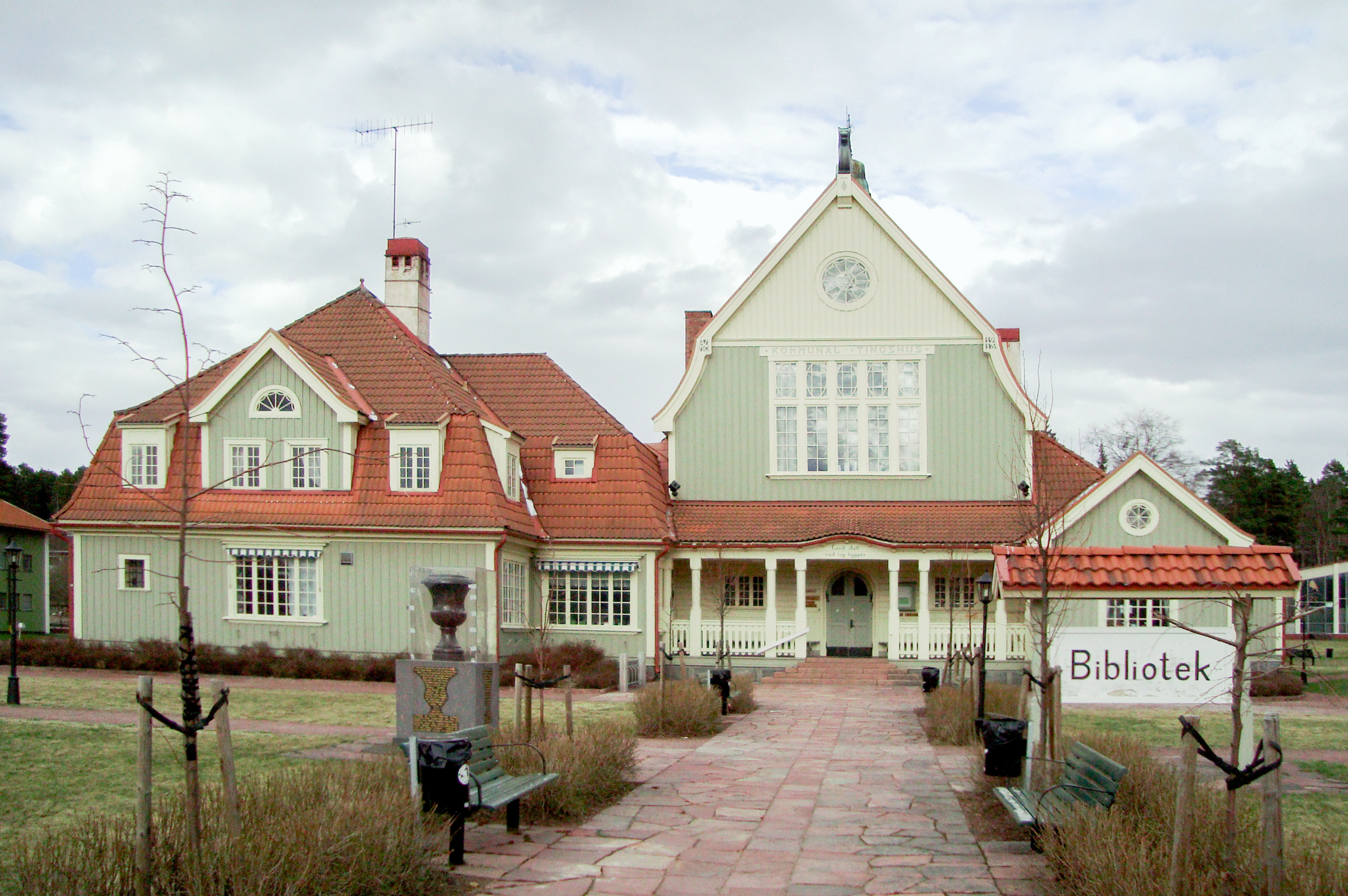

- Coat of arms

- Coordinates: 61°14′N 14°02′E
- Country: Sweden
- County: Dalarna County
- Seat: Älvdalen

Area
  - Total: 7,142.83 km^{2} (2,757.86 sq mi)
  - Land: 6,871.51 km^{2} (2,653.10 sq mi)
  - Water: 271.32 km^{2} (104.76 sq mi)
- Area as of 1 January 2014.

Population (30 June 2025)
  - Total: 6,856
  - Density: 0.9977/km^{2} (2.584/sq mi)
- Time zone: UTC+1 (CET)
  - Summer (DST): UTC+2 (CEST)
- ISO 3166 code: SE
- Province: Dalarna and Härjedalen
- Municipal code: 2039
- Website: www.alvdalen.se
- Density is calculated using land area only.

Älvdalen Municipality (Swedish: Älvdalens kommun, Elfdalian: Övdalskommun / Kommun Övdaln) is a municipality in Dalarna County in central Sweden. Its seat is located in the town of Älvdalen.

The two parishes Särna and Idre were ceded to Sweden from Norway under the treaty of Brömsebro on 13 August 1645. In 1971 the three municipalities Särna, Idre (which itself had been split off from Särna in 1916) and Älvdalen were amalgamated to form the present municipality.

Älvdalen literally means River Valley, a name stemming from the area around the town Älvdalen, situated along the Österdal River, in the municipality's southern part.

The middle part of the coat of arms is meant to depict the landscape: streams and hills.

== Geography ==
Geographically, it is considered divided into three parts. From north to south: the mountainous (fjäll) part, the forest part, and the valley (Älv) part.

=== North ===
The northern part is located within the Scandinavian mountain range. It has cultural influences from the native Sámi people.

Idre, with about 800 inhabitants is a notable skiing resort.

This part has some high mountains including Storvätteshågna at 1,204 meters and Städjan at 1,131 m. The Töfsingdalen National Park is also located in the northernmost parts.

The Northern part is the northernmost point of Svealand, one of the three crowns under the Swedish throne.

=== Central ===
The forest part has forests, with the national park Fulufjället also belonging to this part. Its influences come from it bordering to Norway, and its history has many examples and remains from its border conflicts. To symbolize this, the lower part of the coat of arms depict a crossbow. The point furthest away from any seas in Scandinavia is located here.

The town Särna is located along the Österdal River, with 930 inhabitants. Like Idre, its main industry is tourism. The town once belonged to Norway, but in 1644 it was occupied by 200 Swedish peasants, which in effect made it a Swedish town, although it was official granted first with new borders of 1751.

=== South ===
The southern area is populated by 5,000 persons, of whom most speak or understand the Elfdalian (or Övdalsk, Älvdalsmål) dialect/language, which is very different from standard Swedish.

This area may be said to have the most interesting culture, with the town Älvdalen and several notable villages such as Evertsberg, Blyberg, Klitten, Brunnsberg, Västermyckeläng and Åsen.

=== Localities ===
- Älvdalen
- Ärnäs
- Åsen
- Brunnsberg
- Evertsberg
- Idre
- Klitten
- Rot
- Särna
- Väsa
- Västermyckeläng

== Demographics ==
This is a demographic table based on Älvdalen Municipality's electoral districts in the 2022 Swedish general election sourced from SVT's election platform, in turn taken from SCB official statistics.

In total there were 5,481 Swedish citizens of voting age resident in the municipality. 40.8 % voted for the left coalition and 56.4 % for the right coalition. Indicators are in percentage points except population totals and income.

Location	Residents	Citizen adults	Left vote	Right vote	Employed	Swedish parents	Foreign heritage	Income SEK	Degree
Location			%	%					
Idre	1,147	910	42.6	55.2	81	88	12	25,417	25
Kyrkbyn	2,161	1,633	45.8	51.6	77	85	15	22,825	25
Rot	1,229	940	40.2	56.6	88	95	5	23,739	25
Särna	942	754	32.9	64.6	76	90	10	21,361	18
Väster-Myckeläng	915	734	39.7	57.6	85	97	3	23,319	25
Åsen	644	510	37.3	58.5	83	91	9	22,915	24
Source: SVT

== Riksdag elections ==
Year	%	Votes	V	S	MP	C	L	KD	M	SD	NyD	Left	Right
1973	86.3	5,444	4.6	38.9		40.5	9.0	1.8	4.9			43.3	54.4
1976	88.4	5,699	3.2	38.4		41.0	8.4	1.6	6.1			41.6	55.6
1979	85.7	5,588	3.5	41.8		36.8	6.9	1.7	9.0			45.3	52.7
1982	87.8	5,694	3.0	45.3	1.6	31.8	4.1	1.7	12.6			48.3	48.5
1985	85.4	5,533	3.7	43.8	2.2	25.6	10.1		14.5			47.6	50.2
1988	80.8	5,134	3.9	45.2	7.3	22.3	10.2	2.4	8.6			56.3	41.2
1991	82.3	5,225	3.8	40.0	3.2	17.6	6.1	5.0	14.6		9.0	43.9	43.4
1994	82.3	5,161	5.6	48.6	6.7	17.2	3.9	2.8	13.8		0.9	60.9	37.6
1998	75.5	4,611	16.0	38.4	5.2	10.1	2.7	11.9	13.2			59.6	37.8
2002	71.6	4,259	7.9	43.2	4.3	13.6	8.9	8.5	7.9	0.8		55.4	39.0
2006	76.7	4,419	4.7	42.4	2.7	14.5	4.1	5.3	17.6	3.3		49.7	41.4
2010	81.2	4,615	5.3	41.7	3.7	10.6	3.1	3.8	22.8	7.9		50.7	40.2
2014	85.6	4,714	4.5	41.5	2.3	9.6	2.3	2.2	13.5	21.8		48.3	27.7
2018	86.7	4,696	5.3	32.1	1.6	11.8	2.6	5.4	10.9	28.5		50.9	47.3
2022	85.5	4,615	3.5	28.7	2.1	6.6	1.7	8.0	10.6	35.9		40.9	56.2
