= Övdalian =

North Germanic language spoken in Sweden

- Elfdalian
- övdalsk, övdalską
- Pronunciation: [ˈœvdɐlskãː]
- Native to: Sweden
- Region: Älvdalen, Dalarna
- Ethnicity: Swedish
- Native speakers: c. 3,000 (2023)
- Language family: Indo-European: Germanic; North Germanic; East Scandinavian with West Scandinavian elements (or Central Scandinavian); Dalecarlian; Övdalian
- Writing system: Latin (Elfdalian alphabet); Dalecarlian runes (until the 20th century)

Official status
- Regulated by: Swedish Language Council

Language codes
- ISO 639-3: ovd
- Glottolog: elfd1234
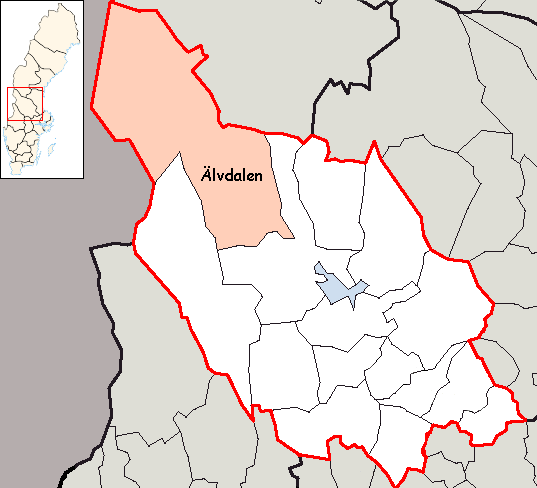
- Älvdalen Municipality in Dalarna, where Övdalian is spoken in the southeastern half

Maps of settlements in Älvdalen parish, Sweden, and the percentage of the population speaking Övdalian (2008 data)

Övdalian or Elfdalian (Elfdalian: övdalsk or övdalską, pronounced [ˈœvdɐlskãː]; Swedish: älvdalska or älvdalsmål) is a North Germanic language spoken by around 3,000 people who live or have grown up in the locality of Älvdalen (Övdaln), in the southeast of Älvdalen Municipality in northern Dalarna, Sweden.

Like all other modern North Germanic languages, Övdalian developed from Old Norse, a North Germanic language spoken by inhabitants of Scandinavia and their overseas settlements during the Viking Age until about 1350–1500. Övdalian developed in relative isolation since the Middle Ages and is considered to have remained closer to Old Norse than the other Dalecarlian dialects.

Traditionally regarded as a Swedish dialect, but by several criteria closer to West Scandinavian dialects, Övdalian is a separate language by the standard of mutual intelligibility. There is low mutual intelligibility between Swedish and Övdalian, but, since education and public administration in Älvdalen are conducted in Swedish, native speakers are bilingual and speak Swedish at a native level. People who speak Swedish as their sole native language, neither speaking nor understanding Övdalian, are also common in the area.

== Classification ==
Övdalian belongs to the Northern branch/Upper Siljan branch of the Dalecarlian dialects or vernaculars, which in their turn evolved from Old Norse, specifically the Old East Norse regional vernacular Old Dalecarlian (Swedish: forndalska), in contrast to Old Swedish. Old Dalecarlian vernaculars might have split as early as in the eighth or ninth century, not long after the North Germanic languages split into Western and Eastern branches.

Övdalian (and other Dalecarlian language varieties) is traditionally placed among the East Scandinavian languages, together with Swedish and Danish, based on a number of features that Övdalian has in common with them. According to Lars Levander, some of the West Scandinavian features that simultaneously do occur in Övdalian are archaic traits that once were common in many Scandinavian dialects and have been preserved in the most conservative tongues east and west of Kölen. However, this is rebutted by Kroonen.

== Characteristics ==
=== Archaisms ===
- Lack of syllable lengthening.
- Retention of voiced fricatives /ð/, /ɣ/ and /β/.
- Retention of nominative, accusative and dative cases.
- Retention of Proto-Germanic, Proto-Norse and Old Norse nasal vowels.
- Retention of Proto-Germanic voiced labial-velar approximant /w/: wattn ('water'), will ('wants'), wet ('knows'): compare English water, will, and wit and Standard Swedish vatten, vill and vet.
- Retention of consonant clusters ld, nd, mb, rg, gd and ng (with audible [ɡ]), as in ungg ('young'), kweld ('evening'), warg ('wolf') and lamb ('lamb') from Old Norse ungʀ, kveld, vargʀ (both with /w/ represented by 'v') and lamb.

=== Innovations and unique developments ===
- More frequent assimilation of pre-Norse mp, nt, and nk to pp, tt, and kk, as in West Scandinavian dialects.
- Shift of a to o before Pre-Norse nk (but not kk).
- Shift of Old Norse ei, ey, and au to ie, ä, and o.
- Diphthongization of Old Norse long high vowels í, ý, ú to closing diphthongs ai, åy, au, and of long rounded mid vowels ó, œ to opening diphthongs uo, yö.
- Vowel harmony (present also in other dialects of Central Scandinavia).
- Loss of h: compare Övdalian aus with Swedish hus (or English house) and Övdalian imil with Swedish himmel.

== Status ==
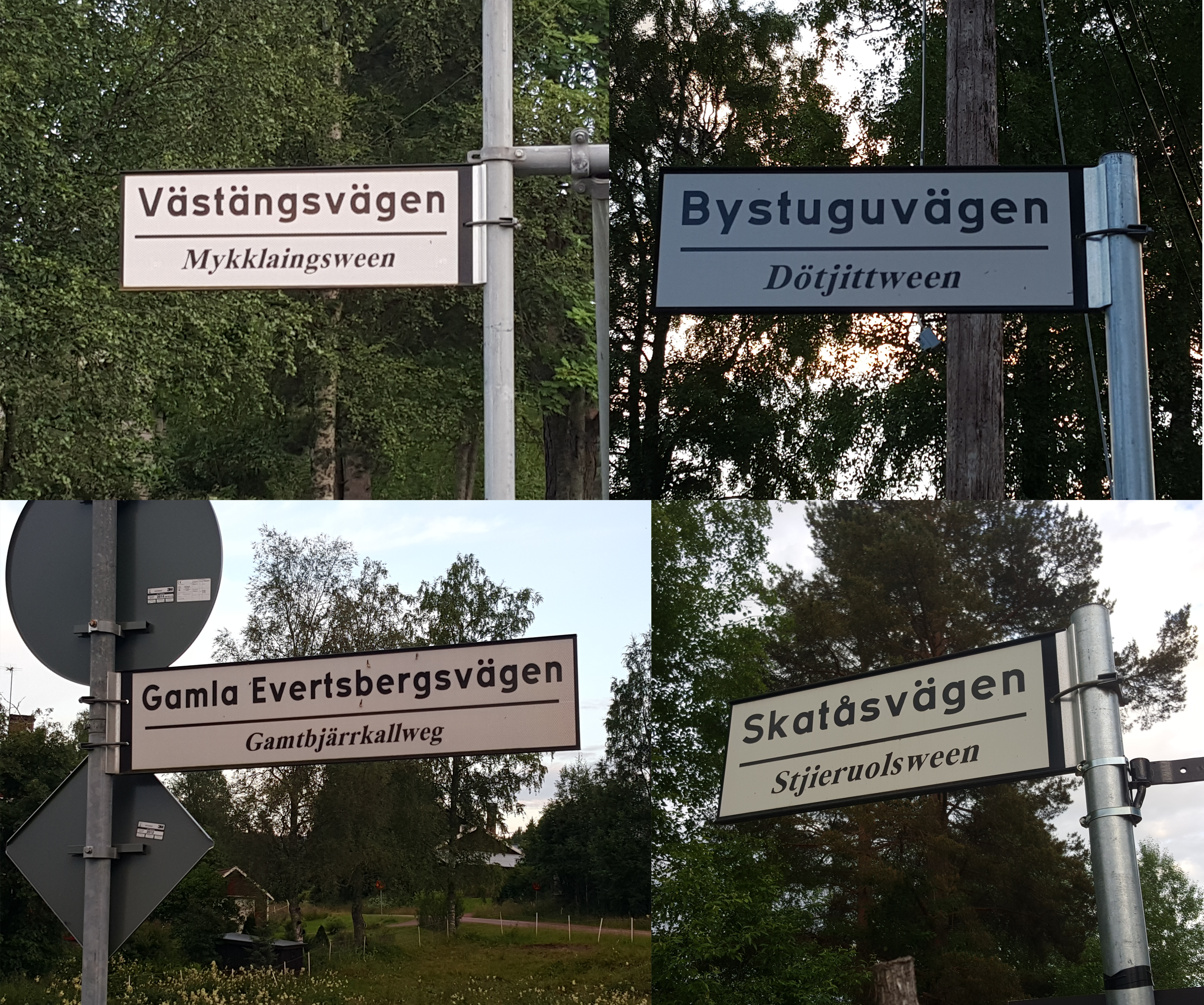
Bilingual street signs in Swedish and Övdalian

As of 2009, Övdalian had around 2,000 speakers and was in danger of language death. However, it is possible that it will receive an official status as a minority language in Sweden, which would entail numerous protections and encourage its use in schools and by writers and artists. The Swedish Parliament was due to address the issue in 2007, but has not yet done so. The Council of Europe has urged the Swedish government to reconsider the status of Övdalian on a total of five occasions. The Committee of Experts now encourages the Swedish authorities to investigate the status of Övdalian through an independent scientific study. In 2020, the Committee of Experts concluded that Övdalian fulfils the criteria of a Part II language, and asked the Swedish authorities to include reporting on Övdalian in its next periodical report as the language covered by Part II of the Charter, which the Swedish Ministry of Culture has not done in its 8th periodical report to the Council of Europe.

=== Preservation and standardization ===
Ulum Dalska, The Organization for the Preservation of Övdalian, was established in 1984 with the aim of preserving and documenting the Övdalian language. In 2005, Ulum Dalska launched a process aimed at bringing about an official recognition of Övdalian as a language by the Swedish authorities.

Råðdjärum, The Övdalian Language Committee was established in August 2004 within Ulum Dalska, its first task being to create a new standard orthography for Övdalian (to combine the Åsen, Blyberg and Evertsberg dialects). In March 2005, the new orthography created by Råðdjärum was accepted by the Ulum Dalska at their annual meeting. Råðdjärum consists of five permanent members: linguist Östen Dahl, dialectologist Gunnar Nyström, teacher Inga-Britt Petersson, linguist and coordinator of the committee Yair Sapir, and linguist Lars Steensland.

As an initiative from Ulum Dalska to encourage children to speak Övdalian, all school children in Älvdalen who finish the ninth grade and can prove that they can speak Övdalian receive a 6,000 Swedish krona stipend.

An online version of Lars Steensland's 2010 Övdalian dictionary was published in September 2015.

In March 2016, Swedish Radio reported that the Älvdalen City Council had decided that, starting in autumn 2016, the local kindergarten would operate solely through the medium of Övdalian.

== Phonology ==
Övdalian is comparable to Swedish and Norwegian in the number and the quality of vowels but also has nasal vowels. It has retained the Old Norse dental, velar and labial voiced fricatives. Alveolo-palatal affricate consonants occur in all Uvǫ Silan (Swedish Ovansiljan, north of Siljan) dialects. The realization of ⟨r⟩ is [r], an apical alveolar trill. Unlike many variants of Norwegian and Swedish, Övdalian does not assimilate /rt, rd, rs, rn, rl/ into retroflex consonants. The stress is generally on the first syllable of a word.

=== Consonants ===
		Labial	Dental/ Alveolar	Post-alv./ Palatal	Velar
Plosive	voiceless	p	t		k
Plosive	voiced	b	d		ɡ
Affricate	voiceless		t͡ɕ ~ t͡sʲ		
Affricate	voiced		d͡ʑ ~ d͡zʲ		
Fricative	voiceless	f	s̺		
Fricative	voiced	v	ð		ɣ
Nasal		m	n		ŋ
Trill/Flap			r	(ɽ)	
Approximant	voiced	w	l	j	
Approximant	voiceless		l̥		

- The voiceless plosives /p/, /t/, and /k/ are aspirated word-initially unless following /s/.
- [ð] and [ɣ] are also commonly heard as allophones of /d/ and /ɡ/ respectively in complementary distribution; the fricative allophones surface after vowels when short, and the plosive allophones surface elsewhere. [ð] can surface word-initially in some pronouns and adverbs by sandhi.
- [l] and [ɽ] are allophones of /l/ in complementary distribution; the former surfaces when long, when adjacent to /t/ or /d/ and, for many speakers, before /n/, and the latter allophone surfaces elsewhere.
- [w] is also an allophone of /v/ in complementary distribution; the former surfaces after a tautomorphemic vowel, and the latter surfaces before a tautomorphemic vowel. It is also sometimes realised as [b] before /d/. The fricative allophone was historically realised as [β].
- The sound /s̺/ is typically realised as apico-alveolar. The affricates /t͡ɕ, d͡ʑ/ are realised as alveolo-palatal [t͡ɕ, d͡ʑ] in western villages and as [t͡sʲ, d͡zʲ] in eastern ones.

=== Vowels ===
	Front		Central	Back
Near-close	ɪ ɪː	ʏ ʏː	ʉ̞ ʉ̞ː	
Close-mid				o oː
Open-mid	ɛ ɛː	œ œː	ɐ	ɔ ɔː
Open	æ æː		aː	

- The sounds /o oː/ are heard as /ʊ ʊː/ in some parts of Övdaln.

Nasal vowels
	Front		Central	Back
Near-close	ɪ̃ ɪ̃ː	ʏ̃ ʏ̃ː	ʉ̞̃ ʉ̞̃ː	
Close-mid				õ õː
Open-mid	ɛ̃ ɛ̃ː	œ̃ œ̃ː	ɐ̃	ɔ̃ ɔ̃ː
Open	(æ̃ æ̃ː)		ãː	

- The sounds /ɛ̃ ɛ̃ː/ are heard primarily in Övdaln, whereas /æ̃ æ̃ː/ are heard in other parts nearby.
- The sounds /ɔ̃ ɔ̃ː/ are heard as /õ õː/ or /ʊ̃ ʊ̃ː/ in some parts of Övdaln.

Unlike Central Swedish, there is no noticeable difference in quality between the long and the short realisations of the vowels.

=== Diphthongs ===
	Front	Central		Back
Near-close	iɛ iɛː yœ yœː	ʉə ʉəː		
Open-mid				ɔyː
Open		ajː	awː	

- The sounds /ʉə ʉəː/ can also be realised as [ʉæ ʉæː], [uə uəː] or [uo uoː], depending on the village. The back-vowel realisations are used in the area west of Dalälven.
- /ɔy/ is realized in some village dialects [ɔj].
- The combination /jʉə/ may be analysed as a sequence of a glide and the diphthong /ʉə/.

Nasal diphthongs
	Front	Central
Near-close	ĩɛ ĩɛː ỹœ ỹœː	ʉ̃ə ʉ̃əː
Open		ãjː

- The sounds /ʉ̃ə ʉ̃əː/ can also be realised as [ʉ̃æ ʉ̃æː], [ũə ũəː] or [ũo ũoː], depending on the village (the back-vowel realisations being typical of the area west of Dalälven).
- The above are phonemically nasal diphthongs; all diphthongs may be nasalised allophonically in front of a nasal consonant.

=== Nasal vowel sounds ===
Övdalian has nasal versions of most vowels. They have several origins, belonging to different layers of history, but most involve the loss of a nasal consonant, with lengthening and nasalisation of a preceding vowel.

- Late Proto-Germanic loss of *n before *h, which was lost in early Norse, but the nasalisation remained: gą̊tt "doorway" (Proto-Germanic *ganhtiz).
- Old Norse loss of nasal consonants before *s: gą̊ss "goose" (Proto-Germanic *gans), įster "lard" (Middle Low German: inster).
- Old Norse loss of *n before *l and *r: ųor "our" (Proto-Norse unzraz).
- Old Norse loss of word-final *n but only monosyllables: ą̊ "on" (Proto-Germanic *an), sją̊ "to see" (Proto-Germanic *sehwaną), tųo "two (accusative)" (Proto-Germanic *twanz) and the prefix ųo- "un-" (Proto-Germanic *un-).
- Central Scandinavian loss of word-final -n if it had been preserved in Old Norse generally; The change affected neither Standard Swedish, nor final geminate -nn. The shift occurred in primarily the definite noun suffix of feminine nouns but also ą̊ "she" and a few other words.
- Secondary post-Norse loss of n before s: rįesa "to wash" (Old Norse: hreinsa), wįster "left" (Old Norse vinstri with /w/-sound)
- Spontaneous (non-etymological) nasality: rįesa "to travel" (from Low German: rēsen), kęse "cheese" (Old Norse: kæsir, from Latin: caseus).
- Before nasal consonants. This case of nasalisation is allophonic and is not indicated in the orthography.

Nasal vowels are quite rare in Nordic languages, and Övdalian and a few other neighbouring Dalecarlian dialects are the only ones that preserve nasal vowels from Proto-Norse; all other Nordic dialects with nasal vowels have developed them later as a result of the loss of a nasal consonant: compare Kalix dialect hąt and gås with Övdalian and and gą̊s.

=== Prosody ===
As in most Germanic languages, main stress is normally on the first syllable in words of native origin, but many loanwords have non-initial stress. The initial stress moves to the last syllable in phrase-final position in certain pronouns, prepositions and adverbs (noger "someone", yvyr "over", itjä "not", older "never") and in personal names and some kinship terms in vocative function. Non-initial compound elements have secondary stress, but if they are polsysyllabic and their lexically stressed syllable is short, the secondary stress falls on the next syllable after the lexically stressed one (e.g. ˈsåmår "summer", but ˈsiensåˌmår "late summer").

Like most other North Germanic language varieties spoken in Sweden and Norway, Övdalian has a tone contrast between two lexically determined accents that are associated with the primary-stressed syllable in a word and originally correspond to monosyllabic and polysyllabic words in Old Norse, respectively. The realisation of the contrast is similar to that found in Central Swedish, in that accent 1 has one peak in focus position, while accent 2 has two peaks in focus position and the second peak is normally realised on the post-stress syllable. Unlike Central Swedish, however, accent 2 can occur in monosyllabic words - the words in question were originally disyllabic but have undergone apocope. Compounds typically have accent 2 (e.g. ^{2}iennbru "iron bridge"), but, as in most Norwegian and some Swedish dialects, some of them have accent 1 instead, such as those with a first element ending in a vowel (^{1}blåbruok "blue trousers"), a first element that is itself polysyllabic (^{1}okkymattj "ice hockey match"), past participles of phrasal verbs with a monosyllabic first element (^{1}autkastað "thrown out") and those with an infixed -s- (^{1}landsweg "country road").

== Writing systems ==
In Älvdalen, Germanic runes survived in use longer than anywhere else. The last record of the Övdalian Runes is from the early 20th century; they are a variant of the Dalecarlian runes. Älvdalen can be said to have had its own alphabet during the 17th and 18th century.

Due to the great phonetic differences between Swedish and Övdalian, the use of Swedish orthography for Övdalian has been unpredictable and varied, such as the one applied in the Prytz's play from 1622, which contains long passages in Övdalian, or in the Övdalian material published in the periodical Skansvakten.

A first attempt to create a separate Övdalian orthography was made in 1982 by Lars Steensland. Bengt Åkerberg elaborated it, and it was applied in some books and used in language courses and is based on Loka dialect and is highly phonetic. It has many diacritics (Sapir 2006).

=== Råðdjärum's orthography ===
In March 2005, a uniform standard orthography for Övdalian was presented by Råðdjärum (lit. "Let us confer"), The Övdalian Language Council, and accepted by Ulum Dalska (lit. "Let us speak Dalecarlian"), The Organization for the Preservation of Övdalian. The new orthography has already been applied by Björn Rehnström in his book Trair byönner frą̊ Övdalim 'Three Bears from Älvdalen' published in 2007. Råðdjärum's orthography was also used in Bo Westling's translation of Saint-Exupéry's The Little Prince, Lisslprinsn.

=== Elfdalian alphabet ===
The Elfdalian alphabet consists of the following letters

The Elfdalian alphabet
Upper case	A	Ą	B	C	D	Ð	E	Ę	F	G	H	I	Į	J	K	L	M	N	O	P	Q	R	S	T	U	Ų	V	W	X	Y	Y̨	Z	Å	Ą̊	Ä	Ö
Lower case	a	ą	b	c	d	ð	e	ę	f	g	h	i	į	j	k	l	m	n	o	p	q	r	s	t	u	ų	v	w	x	y	y̨	z	å	ą̊	ä	ö

Other than the letters occurring in the Swedish alphabet, Elfdalian has letters with ogonek, denoting nasal vowels: Ąą, Ęę, Įį, Ųų, Y̨y̨ and Ą̊ą̊. Additionally, it uses the letter eth (Ð, ð) for the voiced dental fricative.

== Grammar ==
=== Morphology ===
Övdalian has a morphological structure inherited from its Old Norse ancestor. Verbs are conjugated according to person and number and nouns have four cases, like Modern Icelandic and German. The Old Norse three-gender system has been retained. Like the other North Germanic languages, nouns have definite and indefinite forms, rather than a separate definite article (as in English). The length of the root syllable plays a major role in the Övdalian declensional and conjugational system. The declension of warg, "wolf" (long-syllabic, strong masculine noun) was as follows in what is sometimes called "Classic Elfdalian" (as described by Levander 1909):

Declension of warg ('wolf')
	Singular		Plural	
	indefinite	definite	indefinite	definite
Nominative	warg	wargen	warger	wargär
Accusative	warg	wardjin	warga	wargą
Dative	wardje	wardjem	wargum	wargum(e)
Genitive	(wardjes)	wardjemes	—	wargumes

Many speakers retain the distinct dative case, which is used especially after prepositions and also certain verbs (such as jåpa, "help"). The distinction between nominative and accusative has been lost in indefinite nouns, and the inherited genitive been replaced by new forms created by attaching -es to the dative (see Dahl & Koptjevskaja-Tamm 2005), a trend that was well underway even in Classic Elfdalian.

=== Syntax ===
Unlike other Swedish vernaculars, the syntax of Övdalian was investigated in the early 20th century (Levander 1909). Although Övdalian syntax has attracted increased attention, a majority of its syntactic elements are still unresearched. In May–June 2007, a group of linguists from the pan-Scandinavian NORMS network conducted fieldwork in Älvdalen especially aimed at investigating the syntactic properties of the language.

Presented with the help of generative syntax, the following features have been identified:

- Only first- and second-person plural pronouns (Rosenkvist 2006, 2010) can be dropped grammatically.
- First-person plural pronouns may be dropped only if they appear directly in front of the finite verb. Verb raising occurs, but there is variation between generations (Garbacz 2006, 2010).
- Multiple subjects seem to occur in clauses with the adverbial sakta, "actually", or the verb lär "is possible" (Levander 1909:109).

Du ir sakt du uvendes duktin dalsk.
literally: "You are advl you very good speak-Övdalian"
"You are actually very good at speaking Övdalian"

That has recently been studied more closely from a generative perspective by Rosenkvist (2007).

Other syntactic properties are negative concord, stylistic inversion, long distance reflexives, verb controlled datives, agent-verb word order in coordinated clauses with deleted subjects, etc. Although some of the properties are archaic features that existed in Old Swedish, others are innovations; none of them has been studied in any detail.

== New organisms named after Övdalian ==
In 2015, a new genus Elfdaliana of deep-sea nudibranch molluscs was named after the Övdalian language in reference to evolutionary basal characters of the new genus never before reported for the family, just as Övdalian preserves ancestral features of Old Norse.
