= Älvdalen =

- Location within Dalarna Location within Sweden
- Coordinates: 61°14′N 14°02′E
- Country: Sweden
- Province: Dalarna
- County: Dalarna County
- Municipality: Älvdalen Municipality

Area
  - Total: 3.02 km^{2} (1.17 sq mi)

Population (31 December 2010)
  - Total: 1,810
  - Density: 600/km^{2} (1,600/sq mi)
- Time zone: UTC+1 (CET)
  - Summer (DST): UTC+2 (CEST)
- Climate: Dfc

Älvdalen (Elfdalian: Övdaln or Tjyörtjbynn; literally "the river valley" or "the church village" respectively) is a locality and the seat of Älvdalen Municipality in Dalarna County, Sweden, with 1,810 inhabitants in 2010.

The parish is widely known for being the place of manufacturing, in 1839, of the 4-meter granite vase (called Älvdalen Vase), installed in the Summer Garden in Saint Petersburg (a gift from Charles XIV John of Sweden to Nicholas I of Russia).

Nearby is the Hykjebergets Nature Reserve, inaugurated by Prince Carl Philip and Princess Sofia in 2016.

== Language ==
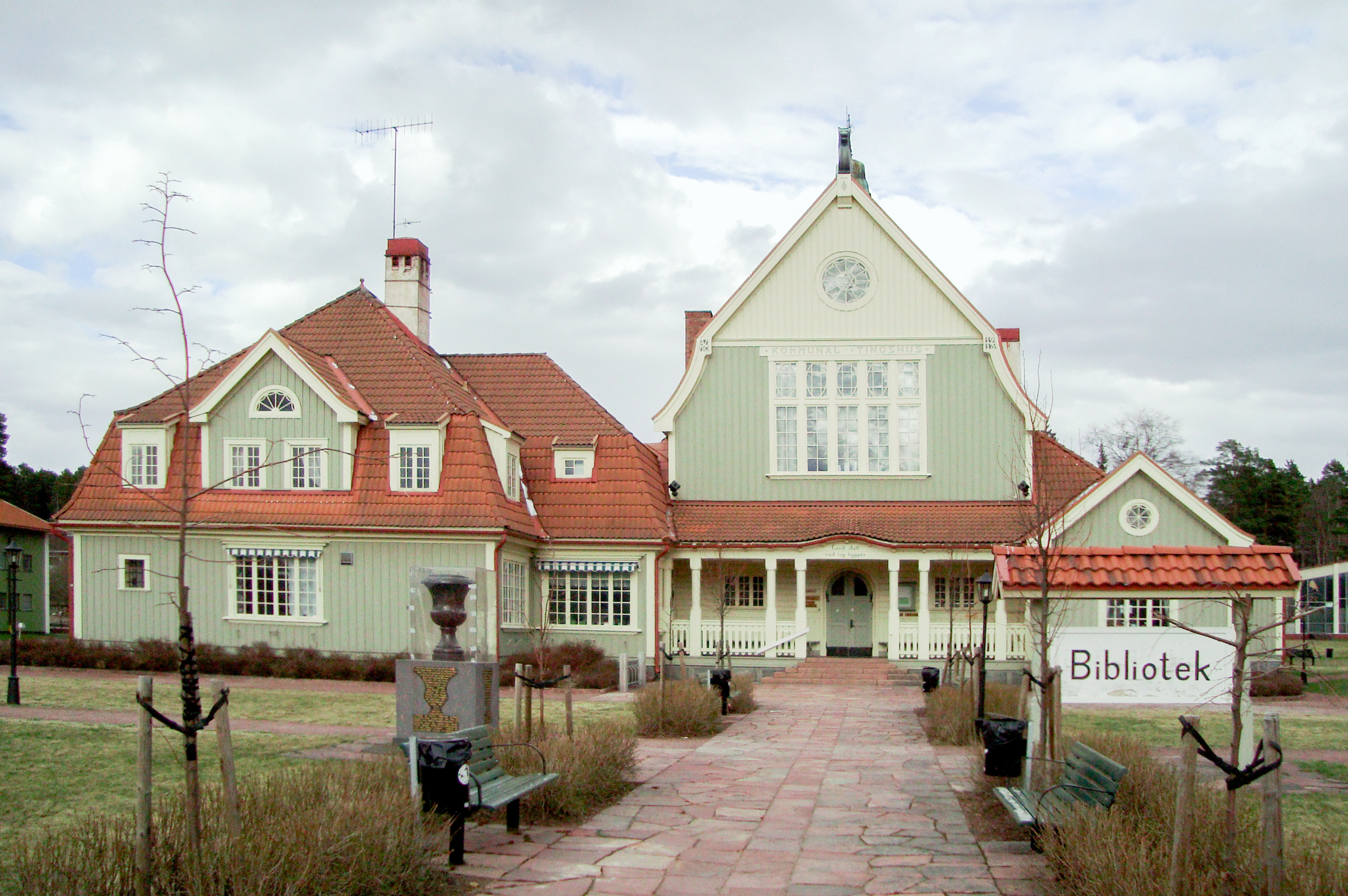
Älvdalen Library

The indigenous language of Älvdalen is Elfdalian. Although it contains many innovations it still preserves various Old Norse traits that have ceased to exist in most other North Germanic languages. The main spoken language in modern times is a Dalecarlian dialect of Swedish, which also is the dominant language in the local administration.

== Climate ==
Älvdalen has a subarctic climate influenced by its location near the furthest interior position on the Scandinavian Peninsula. As a result, seasonal swings are large and the general climate has strong resemblances to Skellefteå much further north at sea level. Being in a river valley, the area is also prone to temperature inversion and harsh freezing. Compared to Mora about 35 kilometres (22 mi) to its southeast, temperature differences are comparatively large since Mora is lower, further south and situated by the slightly moderating lake of Siljan.

Climate data for Älvdalen (2002–2021 averages); extremes since 1968
Month	Jan	Feb	Mar	Apr	May	Jun	Jul	Aug	Sep	Oct	Nov	Dec	Year
Record high °C (°F)	8.3 (46.9)	11.2 (52.2)	16.6 (61.9)	24.5 (76.1)	28.2 (82.8)	33.0 (91.4)	31.8 (89.2)	33.9 (93.0)	26.5 (79.7)	22.2 (72.0)	14.5 (58.1)	10.1 (50.2)	33.9 (93.0)
Mean maximum °C (°F)	5.0 (41.0)	6.1 (43.0)	11.6 (52.9)	17.5 (63.5)	23.9 (75.0)	26.5 (79.7)	28.0 (82.4)	25.9 (78.6)	21.2 (70.2)	14.9 (58.8)	9.3 (48.7)	5.3 (41.5)	29.2 (84.6)
Mean daily maximum °C (°F)	−3.6 (25.5)	−1.2 (29.8)	3.9 (39.0)	9.8 (49.6)	15.2 (59.4)	19.7 (67.5)	22.1 (71.8)	19.8 (67.6)	15.2 (59.4)	8.0 (46.4)	1.9 (35.4)	−2.1 (28.2)	9.1 (48.3)
Daily mean °C (°F)	−7.7 (18.1)	−5.9 (21.4)	−1.7 (28.9)	3.6 (38.5)	8.9 (48.0)	13.3 (55.9)	15.8 (60.4)	14.0 (57.2)	9.8 (49.6)	4.8 (40.6)	−1.4 (29.5)	−5.9 (21.4)	4.0 (39.1)
Mean daily minimum °C (°F)	−11.8 (10.8)	−10.5 (13.1)	−7.3 (18.9)	−2.7 (27.1)	2.6 (36.7)	6.8 (44.2)	9.5 (49.1)	8.1 (46.6)	4.4 (39.9)	−0.3 (31.5)	−4.7 (23.5)	−9.7 (14.5)	−1.3 (29.7)
Mean minimum °C (°F)	−24.6 (−12.3)	−23.3 (−9.9)	−19.3 (−2.7)	−9.6 (14.7)	−4.5 (23.9)	0.2 (32.4)	2.8 (37.0)	0.7 (33.3)	−2.6 (27.3)	−9.1 (15.6)	−15.4 (4.3)	−21.5 (−6.7)	−26.8 (−16.2)
Record low °C (°F)	−37.3 (−35.1)	−35.7 (−32.3)	−32.4 (−26.3)	−19.9 (−3.8)	−7.9 (17.8)	−3.6 (25.5)	−0.5 (31.1)	−3.2 (26.2)	−9.5 (14.9)	−20.3 (−4.5)	−27.0 (−16.6)	−35.7 (−32.3)	−37.3 (−35.1)
Average precipitation mm (inches)	40.4 (1.59)	26.8 (1.06)	23.7 (0.93)	26.6 (1.05)	58.5 (2.30)	68.6 (2.70)	83.2 (3.28)	82.9 (3.26)	50.1 (1.97)	55.7 (2.19)	47.6 (1.87)	37.1 (1.46)	601.2 (23.66)
Source 1: SMHI Open Data
Source 2: SMHI climate data 2002–2021

== See also ==
- Scandinavian Mountains Airport
