= Dalarna =

Historical province of Sweden

- Historical province
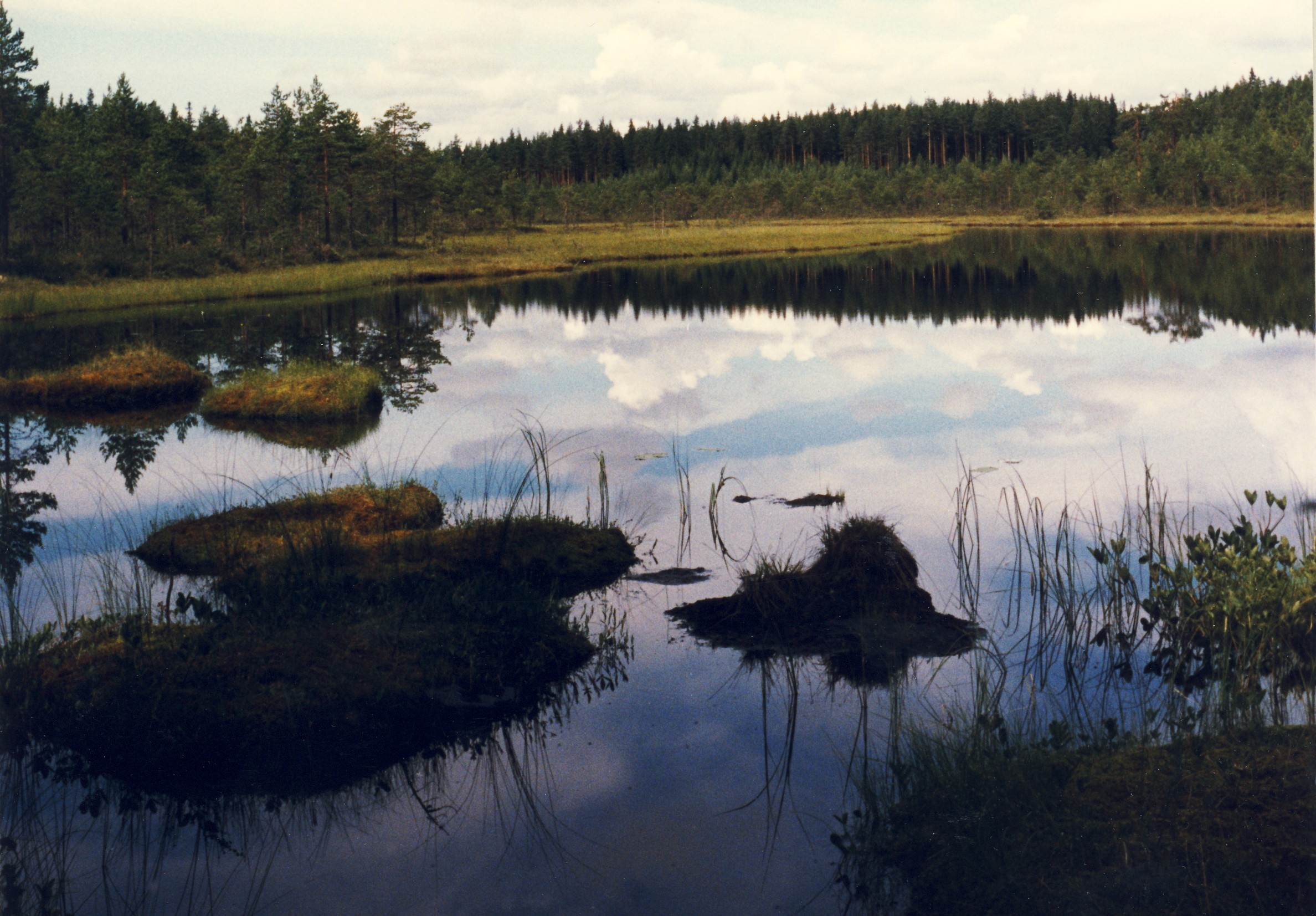

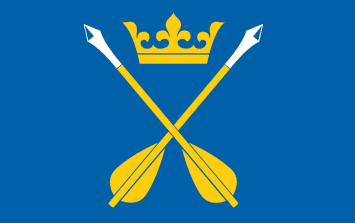
- Flag Coat of arms

- Coordinates: 60°52′N 14°44′E
- Sovereign State: Sweden
- Land: Svealand
- Counties: Dalarna County; Gävleborg County; Jämtland County; Värmland County

Area
  - Total: 29,086 km^{2} (11,230 sq mi)

Population (31 December 2023)
  - Total: 283,814
  - Density: 9.7578/km^{2} (25.272/sq mi)

Ethnicity
  - Language: Swedish
  - Dialect: Dalecarlian

Culture
  - Flower: Harebell
  - Animal: Eagle owl
  - Bird: —
  - Fish: Minnow
- Time zone: UTC+1 (CET)
  - Summer (DST): UTC+2 (CEST)

Dalarna (Swedish: [ˈdɑ̂ːlaɳa]; lit. 'the Dales' or 'the Valleys'), also referred to by the English exonyms Dalecarlia (Note: Pronunciation: UK: /ˌdælɪˈkɑːrliə/ DAL-ih-KAR-lee-ə, US: /ˌdɑːlɪˈkɑːrliə/ DAH-lih-KAR-lee-ə.) and the Dales, is a landskap (historical province) in central Sweden.

Dalarna adjoins Härjedalen, Hälsingland, Gästrikland, Västmanland and Värmland. It is also bordered by Norway in the west. The province's borders mostly coincide with the modern administrative Dalarna County (län).

The area is a holiday destination for Swedes from the south, who often travel there in the summer, drawn by its fishing lakes, campgrounds, and forests. Some Swedes own or rent a second home in Dalarna, where vegetable gardens and apple trees are commonplace. In mid-June, midsummer celebrations and dances are held in many of the small villages and in the larger cities. Dalarna is a region full of historical associations, and both its products and its people have strong local characteristics. In the western district Lima, some people in villages speak a traditional dialect, Dalecarlian, while in Älvdalen, they speak Elfdalian, a dialect which is very distinct from Swedish, Norwegian or Danish. Historically, the people of Dalecarlia – called Dalecarlians, or Dalesmen (dalkarlar, masar) and Daleswomen (kullor) – have been famous for their independent nature toward authority. The Old Norse name of a part of the province was Járnberaland, which means "the land of the iron carriers."

== Administration ==
The provinces of Sweden serve no administrative or political purposes, but function as historical and cultural entities. In the case of Dalarna, a corresponding administrative Dalarna County has almost, but not exactly, the same boundaries as the province, except for a part of the northeast (Hamra parish) which forms part of Ljusdal Municipality, Gävleborg County.

== Heraldry ==
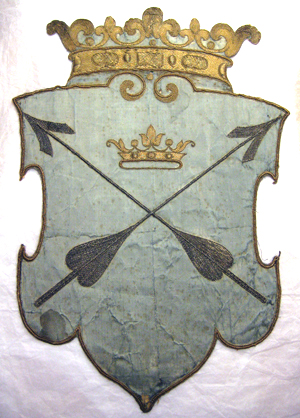
Embroidered coat of arms from 1634

Dalarna's coat of arms dates from 1560; the use of two crossed arrows as a symbol precedes this. The provincial arms include a ducal coronet. Since the 19th century, some members of the royal family have been granted the nominal title of Duke of Dalarna.

Blazon: "Azure, two Dalecarlian Arrows Or in saltire point upwards pointed Argent and in chief a Crown of the first".

As early as 1525, the arrows appeared in use on a seal. The same coat of arms was later granted to Kopparberg County in 1936, which was renamed Dalarna County in 1997.

== Geography ==
The northern part of the province is dominated by mountains and the vast Orsa Finnmark area. The southern part of the province is part of the Bergslagen region, and consists mostly of plains, hills and forested areas. There are several copper mines in the southern part, most notorious of which being the Falun Mine. The highest point is Storvätteshågna, at 1,204 m (3,950 ft) above sea level. The lowest point is in the southeast, at 55 m (180 ft) above sea level.

=== Lakes ===
- Dalarna's largest lake is lake Siljan, in the middle part of Dalarna. There the Västerdal River and Österdal River join the Dal River.
- Dalarna's second largest lake is Runn, which lies between Falun and Borlänge. With 66.6 square kilometres (25.7 mi^{2}) of water and over 50 islands, the lake is a tourist destination.
- Kungsgårdssjön
- Nottjärn
- Orsa Lake
- Rämen
- Varpan
- Vãsman

=== Cities ===
Dalarna was historically divided into chartered cities and districts:

- Avesta (1641–1686, renewed 1919)
- Borlänge (1944, as Borlængio by 1390)
- Falun (1641)
- Hedemora (approximately 1400)
- Ludvika (1919)
- Säter (1642)
- Mora

Since 1971, the cities are seats of their respective municipalities.

=== Other towns ===
- Vansbro
- Leksand
- Orsa
- Älvdalen
- Rättvik
- Tällberg
- Malung
- Sälen
- Särna (and Idre)
- Smedjebacken
- Gagnef

=== National parks ===
- Färnebofjärden
- Fulufjället
- Hamra
- Töfsingdalen
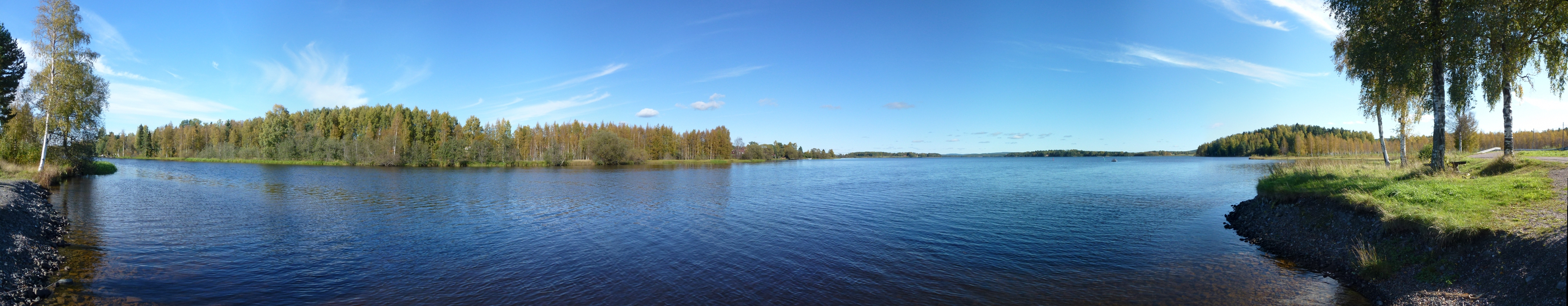
Lake Runn (Runnsjön) close to Torsång (Borlänge)

== History ==
The province of Dalarna formed part of Svealand before the formation of Sweden in the 11th century.

Three historically notorious rebellions started in the Dalarna province:

- In 1434, led by Engelbrekt Engelbrektsson, the miners rose against the oppression of the officers of Eric of Pomerania.
- In 1519–1523 Gustav Vasa found his first and staunchest supporters among the miners in his revolt against the Kalmar Union under King Christian II.
- In 1524–1533 the Dalecarlians and local nobles rebelled against Gustav's increasingly autocratic rule and reformist religious policies; three uprisings were brutally suppressed. Some of the leaders were executed as alleged collaborators of King Christian during the liberation war.
- In 1743, the Dalecarlian Rebellion against the Hats, which was the last major peasants' uprising in Sweden.
- The population in 1841 was 121,208.

== Culture ==
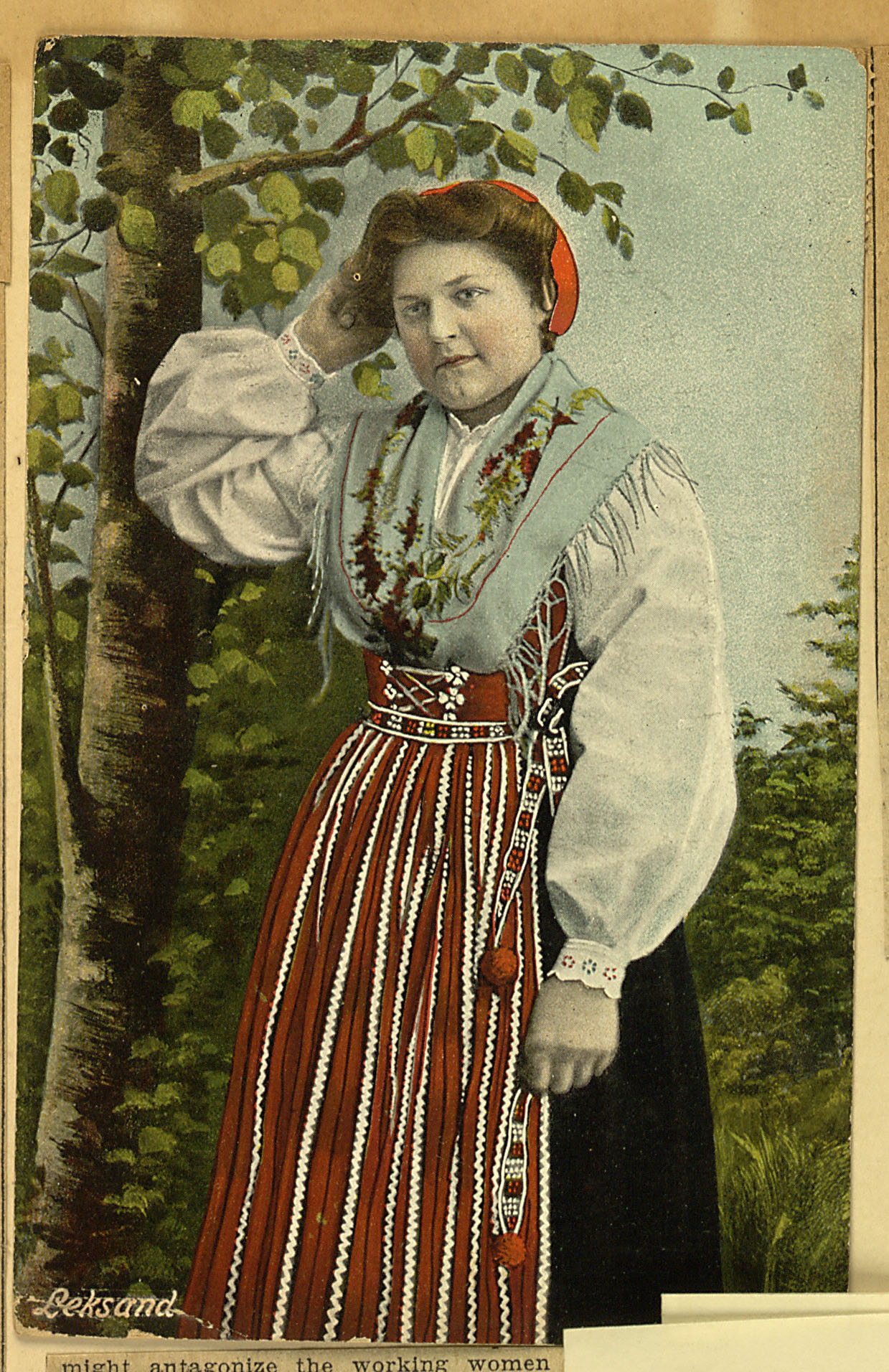
A Daleswoman from Leksand in traditional folk dress, 1911.

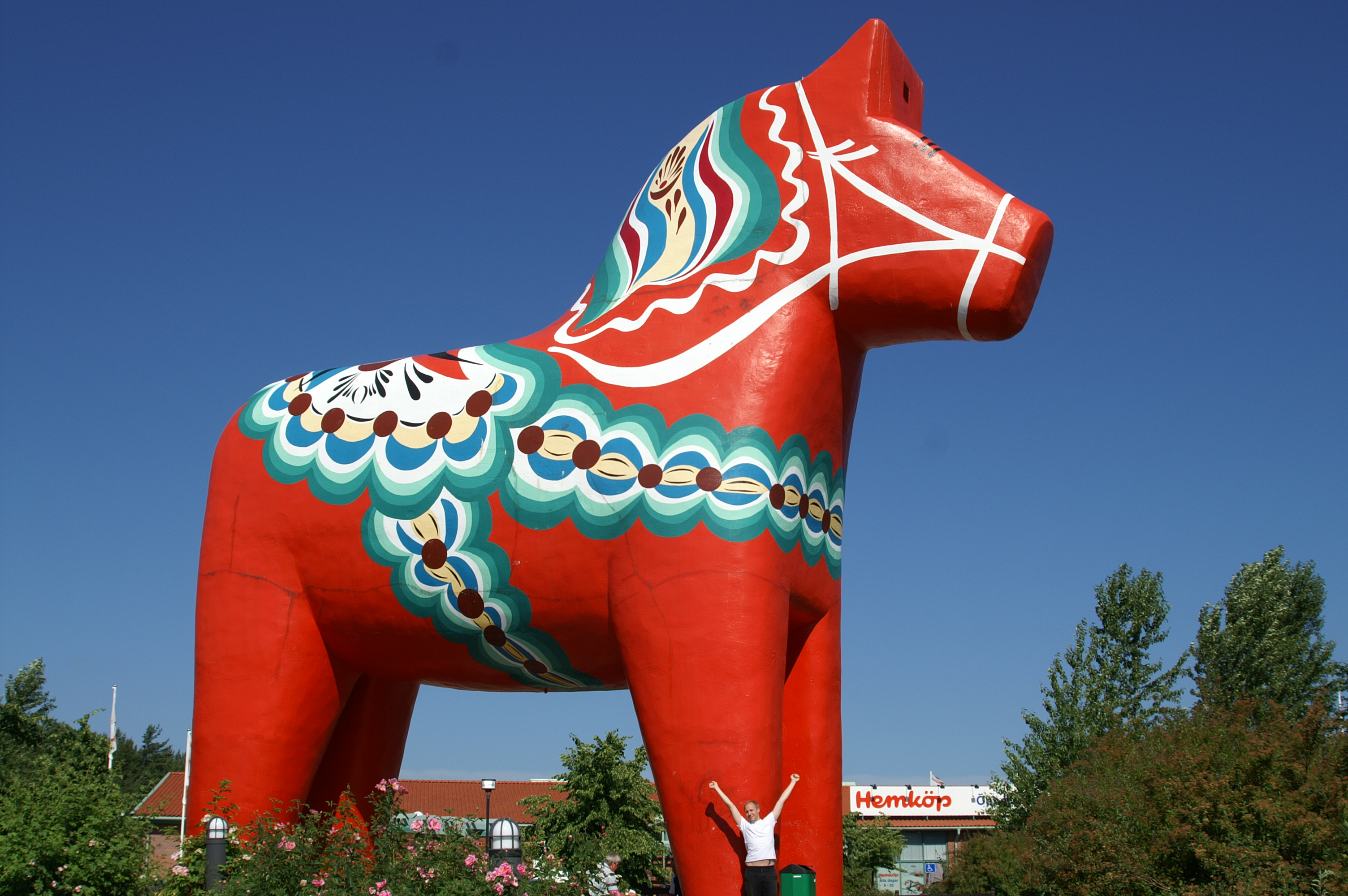
A giant Dala horse in central Avesta.

Dalarna has a long history of folk traditions, notably regional folk music, kurbits painting, and local handicrafts. The province preserved the use of the Runic alphabet longer than any other region; a local variety, known as Dalecarlian runes or Dalrunes, survived in use into the 19th century.

A symbol of the province is the Dalecarlian horse, in Swedish Dalahäst, a painted and decorated wooden horse. Sulky racing is common in the region. The high level of calcium in the soil favours horse breeding.

UNESCO has named the mining area of the Stora Kopparberg ("Great Copper Mountain") in Falun a World Heritage Site.

== Notable natives ==
- Jesper Boqvist, ice hockey player
- Jussi Björling, opera singer
- Cryonic Temple, heavy metal band
- Joacim Cans, musician
- Fredy Clue, artist and musician
- Björn Dixgård, musician
- Johan Erik Forsström, naturalist
- Lars Frölander, swimmer
- Amanda Hollingby Matsson, singer
- Lina Hurtig, footballer
- Hypocrisy (band), death metal band
- Emil Janel, Swedish-American artist
- Sixten Jernberg, skier
- Anders Kallur, ice hockey player
- Jenny Kallur, sprinter
- Sanna Kallur, sprinter
- Nils Karlsson ("Mora-Nisse"), skier
- Patrick Johansson, musician
- Carl Larsson, painter
- Gustaf de Laval, inventor and engineer
- Nicklas Lidström, ice hockey player
- Mando Diao, alternative rock band
- Kristian Matsson ("The Tallest Man on Earth"), folk musician
- Kalle Moraeus, musician
- Zećira Mušović, footballer
- Gunnar Myrdal, economist and politician
- Gustaf Norén, musician
- Charlie Norman, pianist
- Pain, industrial metal band
- Karin Park, singer
- Tony Rickardsson, speedway rider
- Birgit Ridderstedt, folk singer
- Sabaton (band), power metal band
- Sator, rock band
- Scar Symmetry, death metal band
- Björn Skifs, entertainer
- Gunde Svan, cross-country skier, television presenter
- Peter Tägtgren, musician
- Anders Zorn, painter
- Peter Moren, pop singer, and member of the indie/pop-rock band Peter, Bjorn and John
- Arckanum, black metal band
- Wulkanaz, black metal band

== Districts ==
The Swedish provinces were subdivided into the Hundreds of Sweden, in effect until the early 20th century.

In some provinces, the sub-dividing was through districts. Dalarna had only one chartered hundred; the others were court districts.

- Folkare Hundred
- Grangärde Court District
- Hedemora and Garpenberg Court District
- Husby Court District
- Kopparberg and Aspeboda Court District
- Leksand Court District
- Malung Court District
- Mora Court District
- Norrbärke Court District
- Nås Court District
- Orsa Court District
- Rättvik Court District
- Skedvi Grand Court District
- Sundborn Court District
- Sveg Court District
- Svärdsjö Court District
- Särna Court District
- Söderbärke Court District
- Torsång Court District
- Tuna Grand Court District
- Vika Court District
- Älvdalen Court District

== Sports ==
Skiing is popular in Dalarna. Vasaloppet, a cross-country skiing race (the world's longest) of 90 km, takes place annually, usually on the first Sunday of March, between Sälen and Mora. It commemorates the legendary ski-borne escape of Gustav Eriksson Vasa, who would later become King Gustav I of Sweden, from Danish troops in 1520.

Football in the province is administered by Dalarnas Fotbollförbund. Brage and Dalkurd are examples of football teams in Dalarna. Ice hockey is also popular in Dalarna. The two ice hockey teams and rivals from Dalarna are Leksands IF and Mora IK, both frequently in the highest ice hockey division.
