= Styggforsen =

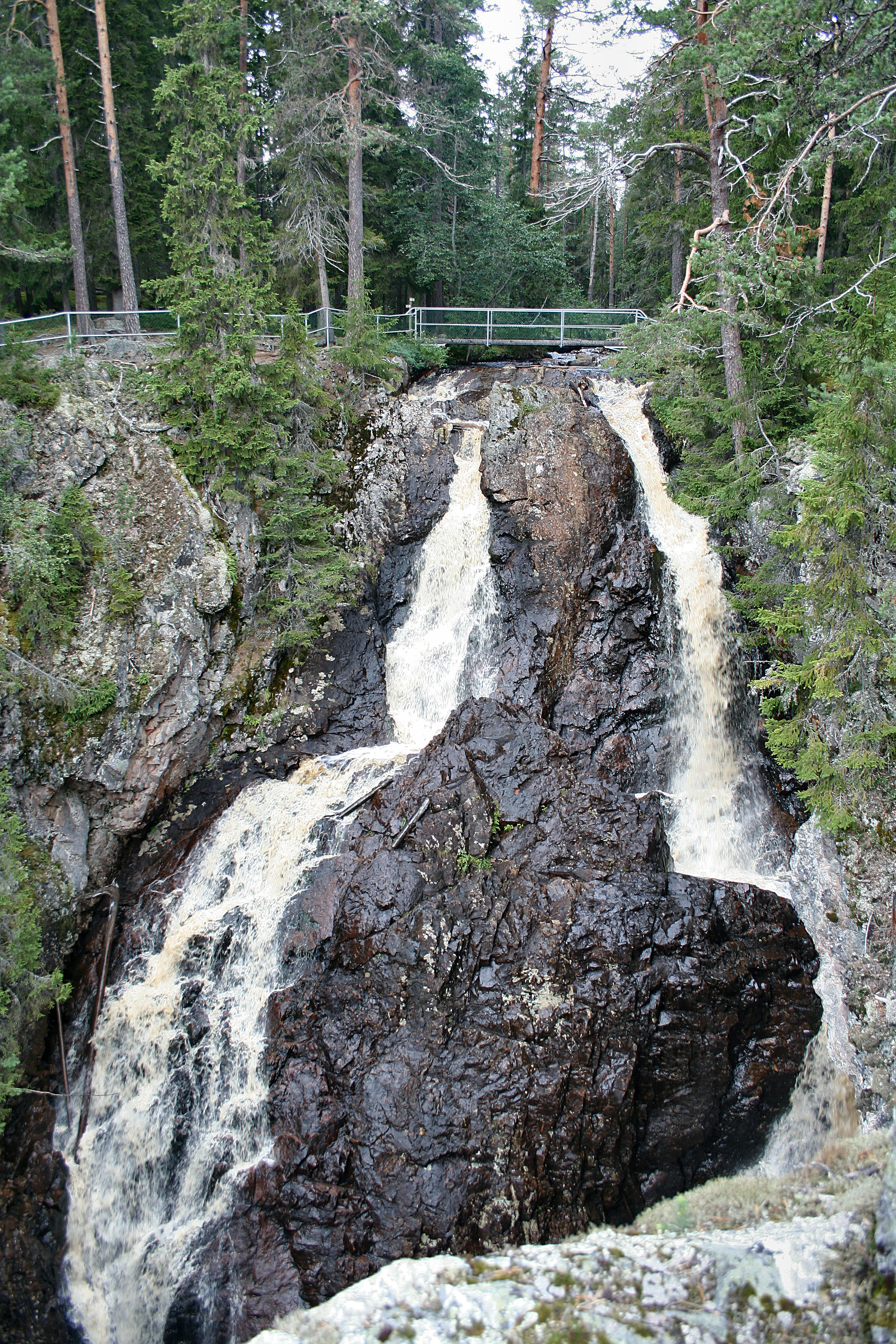
- The upper cascade of Styggforsen waterfall
- Interactive map of Styggforsen
- Location: Dalarna, Sweden
- Coordinates: 61°00′00″N 15°11′00″E
- Total height: 36 metres (118 ft)
- Watercourse: Styggforsån

Styggforsen is a waterfall and a nature reserve located in Dalarna County, Sweden. It is part of the European Union-wide Natura 2000 network.

== Geography ==
The waterfall is located in the village of Boda, 20 kilometres north of Rättvik. It lies at the eastern edge of the Siljan Ring, a prehistoric impact crater formed 377 million years ago during the Devonian period. This crater was created when a bolide, estimated to be about 4 kilometres in diameter and traveling at around 100,000 kilometres per hour, struck the Earth's surface. The impact caused a significant vertical realignment of the horizontal rock strata and created a bedrock depression, resulting in many of the geological features present today, such as Lake Siljan to the southwest and Styggforsen itself.

The Styggforsån river is interrupted by the 36-meter-high Styggforsen waterfall, which is composed of a column of Ordovician limestone. The waterfall's base meets a dike of brecciated quartz believed to predate the impact event. This site is popular with tourists and features a circular path about one kilometre long that leads to a cave called Troll Hole. During the summer, a cafe is open, and there is an information centre nearby.

== Flora and fauna ==
In 1979, a nature reserve of approximately 12 hectares was established around the waterfall, and in 2005, it was incorporated into the Natura 2000 network. The area's moist climate supports a diverse range of lichens, mosses, and plants, including the rare orchid Epipactis atrorubens, Additionally, it provides a habitat for many insect species, including Venusia cambrica, Hyloicus pinastri, and Epirrhoe alternata. Within the nature reserve, picking flowers and any activities that could affect the environment are strictly prohibited.

== Trivia ==
Ingmar Bergman's 1960 film, The Virgin Spring, used Styggforsen as one of its locations.

== See also ==
- List of waterfalls
