= En premiär =

1888 painting by Anders Zorn

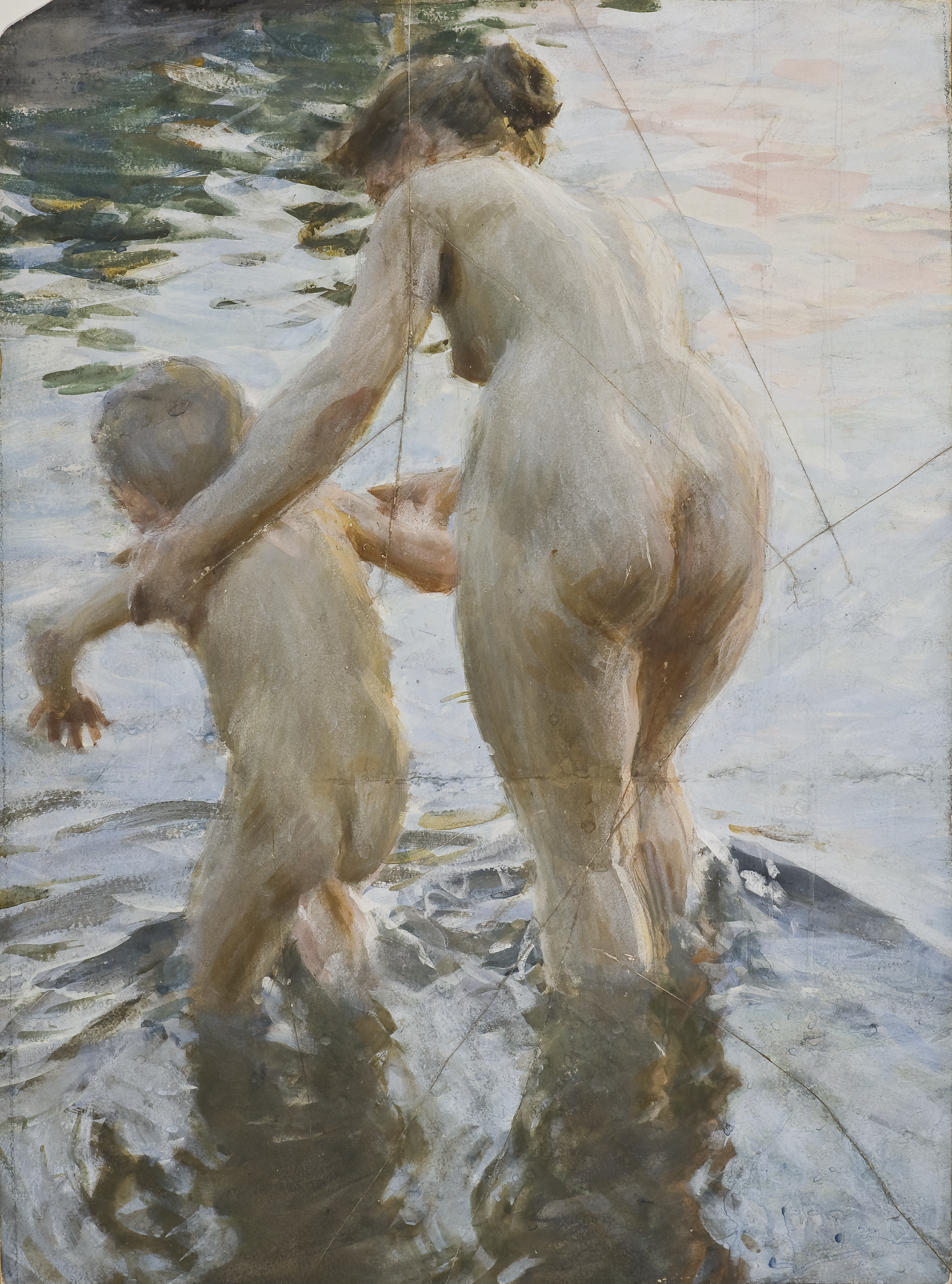
Anders Zorn, En premiär. First version, gouache on paper, 1888, 76 cm × 56 cm (30 in × 22 in). Nationalmuseum, Stockholm

En premiär (Swedish for "A Première" or "The First Time", sometimes known by its French title Une Première) is an artwork by Swedish artist Anders Zorn, with several versions created from 1888 to 1895. The work was one of several works in which Zorn depicted woman bathing outdoors, a genre he described as "naked studies in the open" ("nakenstudier i det fria"). In this composition, a nude woman holding a small child at the edge of the water beside a beach. Different versions are held by the Nationalmuseum in Stockholm, the Ateneum in Helsinki, and the Museum of Fine Arts in Ghent.

== Background ==
Zorn was born in Mora, Sweden, between the lakes of Siljan and Orsasjön. He studied at the Royal Swedish Academy of Arts in Stockholm from 1875 to 1880, and then spent time travelling in Europe, painting watercolours and society portraits in London, Paris and Madrid. He married Emma Zorn (née Lamm) in 1885. After time travelling, they settled at near Mora, now the home of the Zorn Collections.

Zorn spent some time in 1887 and 1888 painting watercolours of naked people enjoying the water at the seaside resort of Dalarö, before moving to Paris to exhibit works there in 1889.

== Description ==
The painting depicts a summer bathing scene. Two people, a mother with an infant boy, are both standing naked near the edge of a large body of water. The mother is holding the arms of the child as they enter the water to bathe or swim. The title may indicate that the scene represents the child's first swimming lesson. At that time, paintings of naked women were controversial outside a mythological setting, and bathing in the sea was banned in the Swedish archipelago.

Nonetheless, Zorn created five versions of the work, the original large watercolour in 1888, three oil paintings - two large and one small - and a small etching from 1890.

The first three versions were made in 1888, starting with a watercolour or gouache on paper, which measures 76 cm × 56 cm (30 in × 22 in). This version was a great success when exhibited at the Exposition Universelle in Paris in 1889, where Zorn won a medal. He won three medals at the Paris Salon that year, two for portraits (a watercolour of the dancer Rosita Mauri, and an oil painting of the journalist Antonin Proust who was serving as Minister of Fine Arts and President of the Exposition) and one for his oil painting of three women bathing, Ute (Outdoors). Zorn was made a Chevalier of the Légion d'honneur. The watercolour was later donated to the Nationalmuseum in Stockholm by Friends of Art through Richard Bergh in 1915.

Zorn also made two oil paintings of the same subject in 1888: a large oil on canvas version, measuring 91 cm × 54.5 cm (35.8 in × 21.5 in), which has been in the collection of the Ateneum in Helsinki since 1922, and a second smaller oil on canvas version, measuring 48.5 cm × 33 cm (19.1 in × 13.0 in), which is in a private collection.

The fourth version is a small etching from 1890, which has dimensions of 23.3 cm × 15.3 cm (9.2 in × 6.0 in), in which the scene is largely delineated by many diagonal lines. The etching exists in four states, and includes a beach strip at the foreground with tall reeds behind the human figures. It is believed that the first gouache version originally had a similar composition but was cropped after the Paris Exhibition.

Zorn later became unhappy with his original 1888 watercolour version, and tore it up in 1894-95, leaving marks that are visible in its existing condition. It was rescued from destruction by Christian Eriksson. Zorn intended to replace the watercolour with a new and better version. This version was his fifth, the second full size version and third oil painting, which measures 96.9 cm × 64.3 cm (38.1 in × 25.3 in). This version was entitled Met moeder (With Mother) and completed in 1895. It is in the Museum of Fine Arts in Ghent, Belgium.

== Similar works ==
Zorn made several other works depicting women bathing around 1888. Other examples include the oil painting Ute (Outdoors), held by Gothenburg Museum of Art, with an 1890 copy held by the Ateneum Art Museum in Helsinki; and his 1890 oil painting The Morning Toilet (also known as With His Mother) shows a mother and son entering the water from a rocky shoreline, viewed from a wider angle, and is held by the Isabella Stewart Gardner Museum; a similar etching With Her Child followed in 1890.

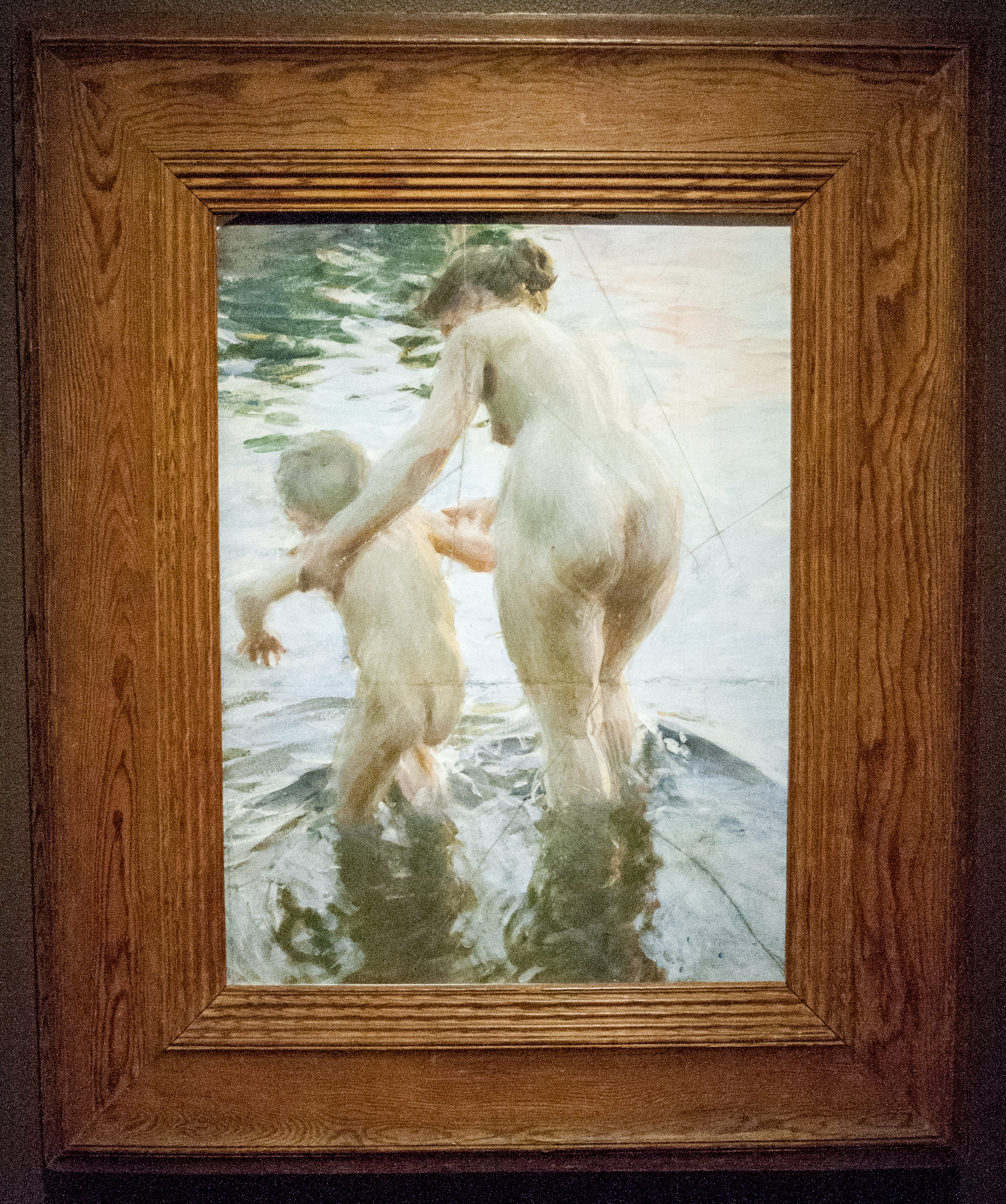
Gouache with frame, 1888, 114 cm × 94 cm × 6 cm (44.9 in × 37.0 in × 2.4 in) , Nationalmuseum, Stockholm

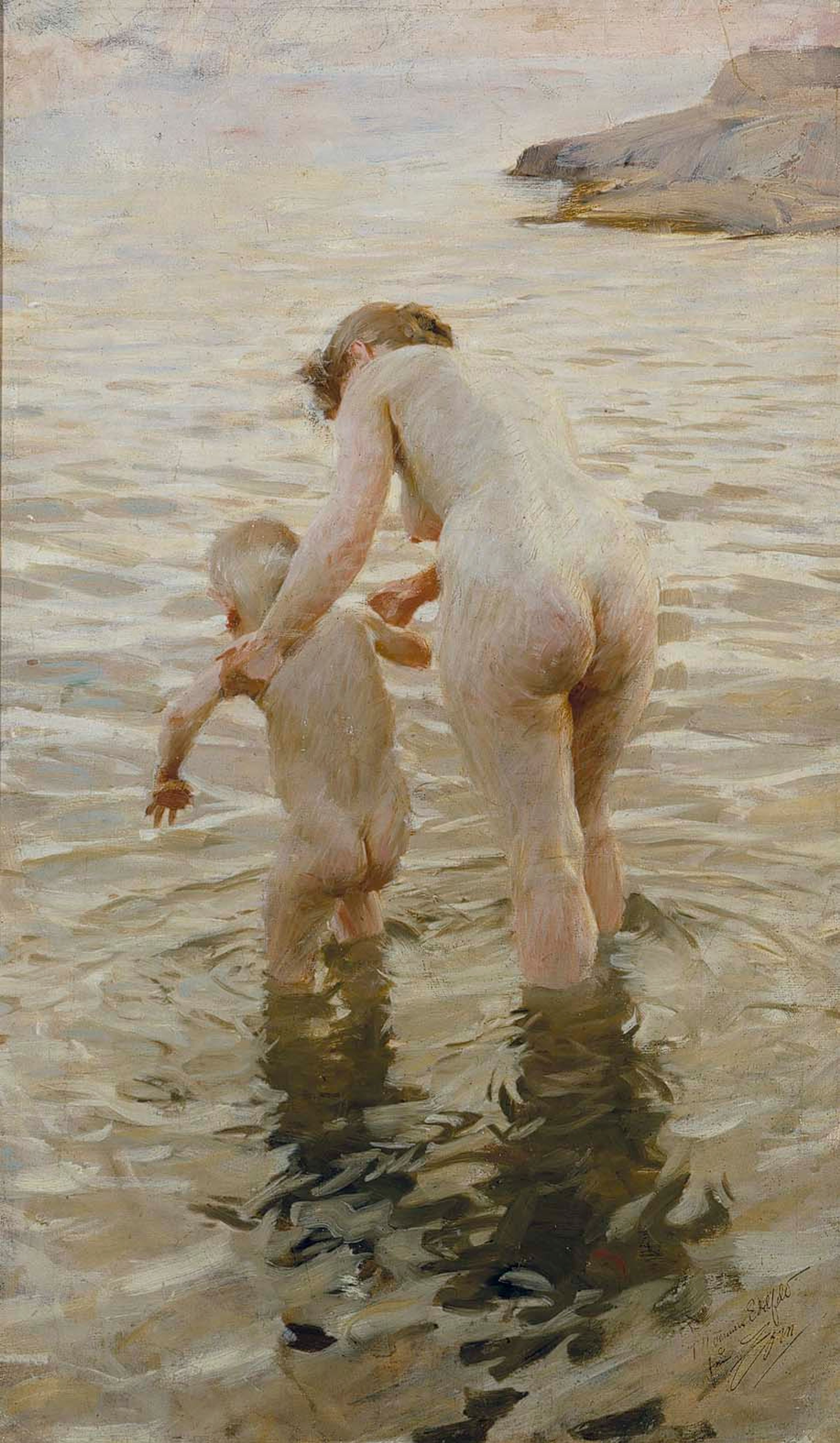
Large oil, 1888, 91 cm × 54.5 cm (35.8 in × 21.5 in), Ateneum, Helsinki

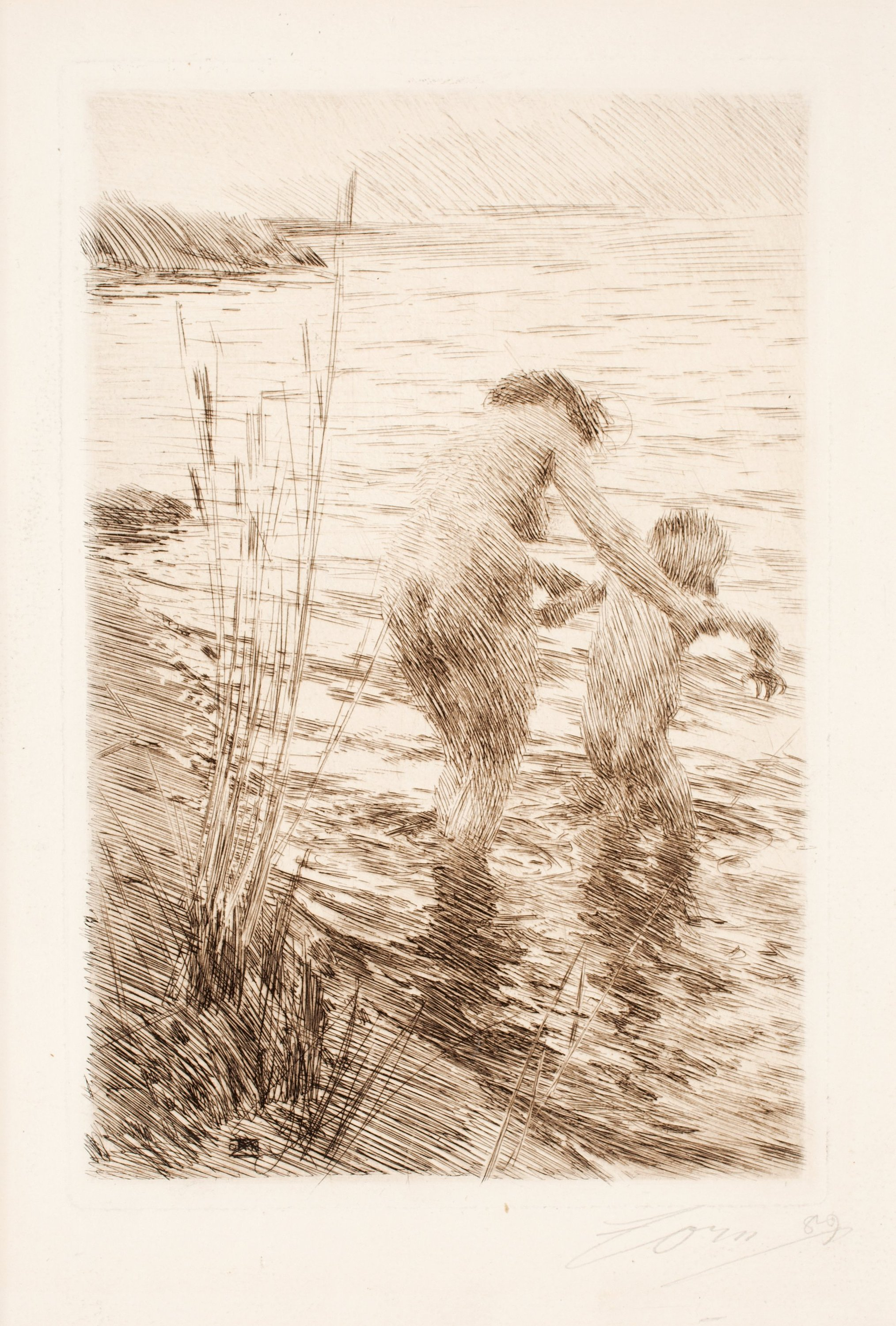
En premiär, 1890 etching, 23.3 cm × 15.3 cm (9.2 in × 6.0 in)

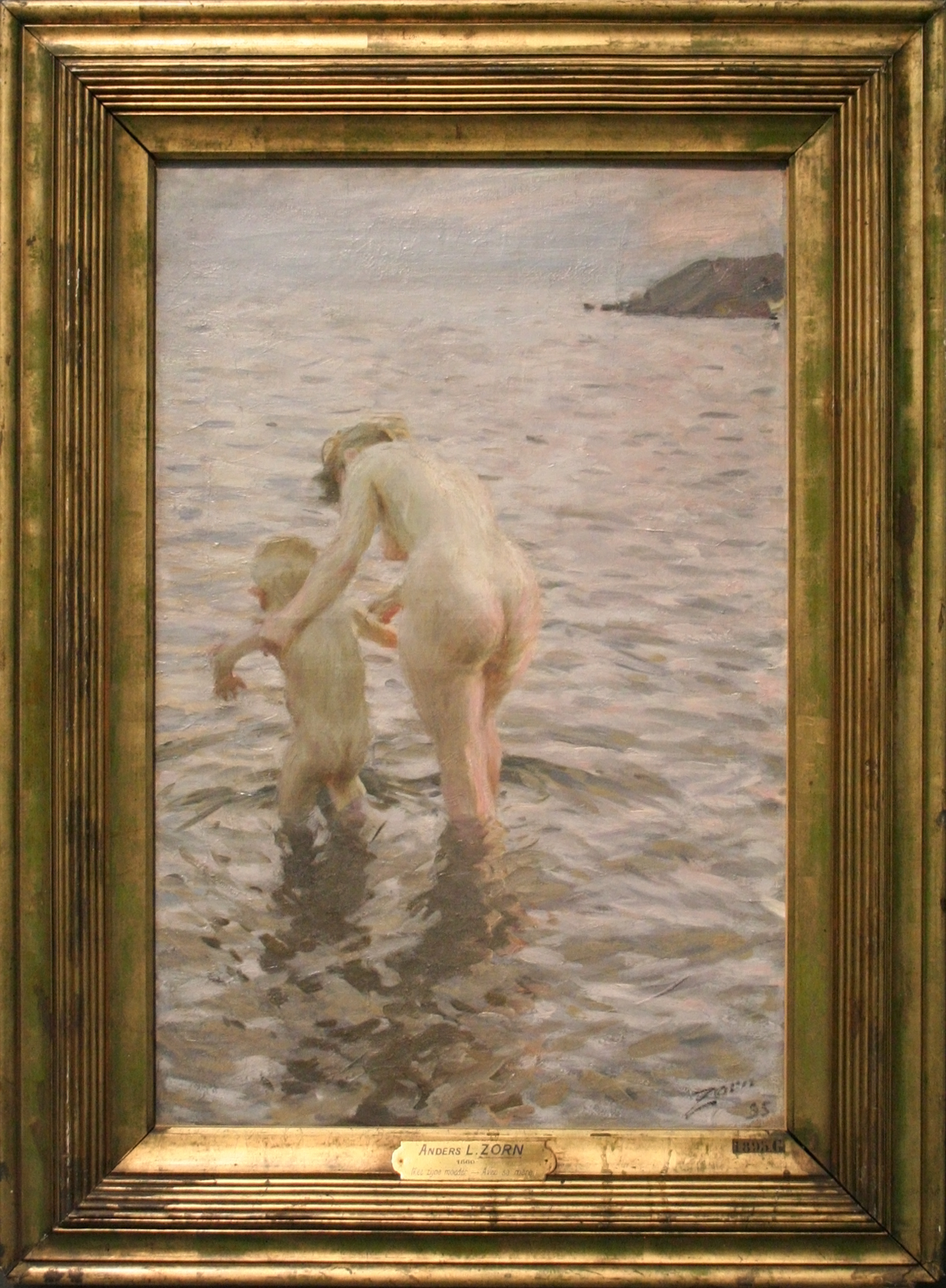
Met moeder (With Mother), oil painting, 1895, 96.9 cm × 64.3 cm (38.1 in × 25.3 in), Museum of Fine Arts, Ghent,
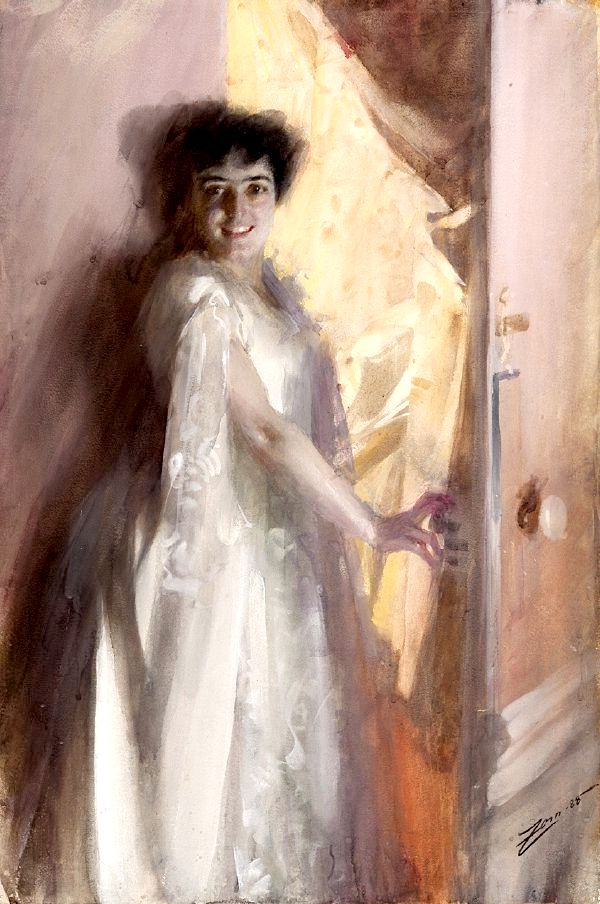
Watercolour of Rosita Mauri, 1888, 103 cm × 69 cm (41 in × 27 in), Göteborgs Kunstmuseum

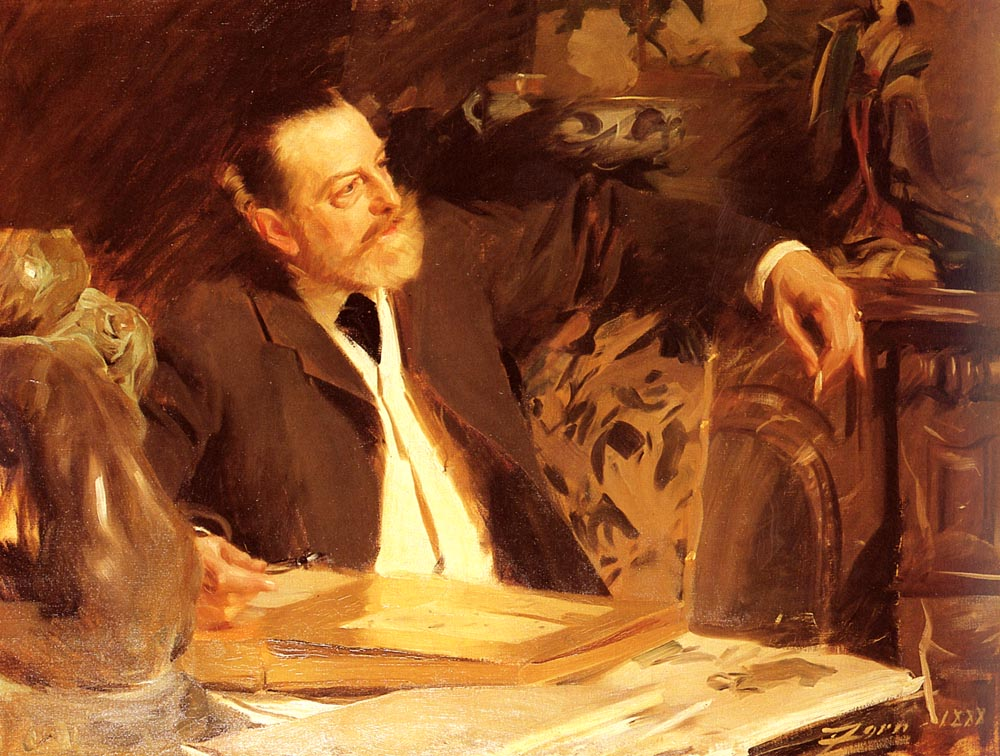
Pil painting of Antonin Proust, 1888, 106 cm × 138 cm (42 in × 54 in), private collection

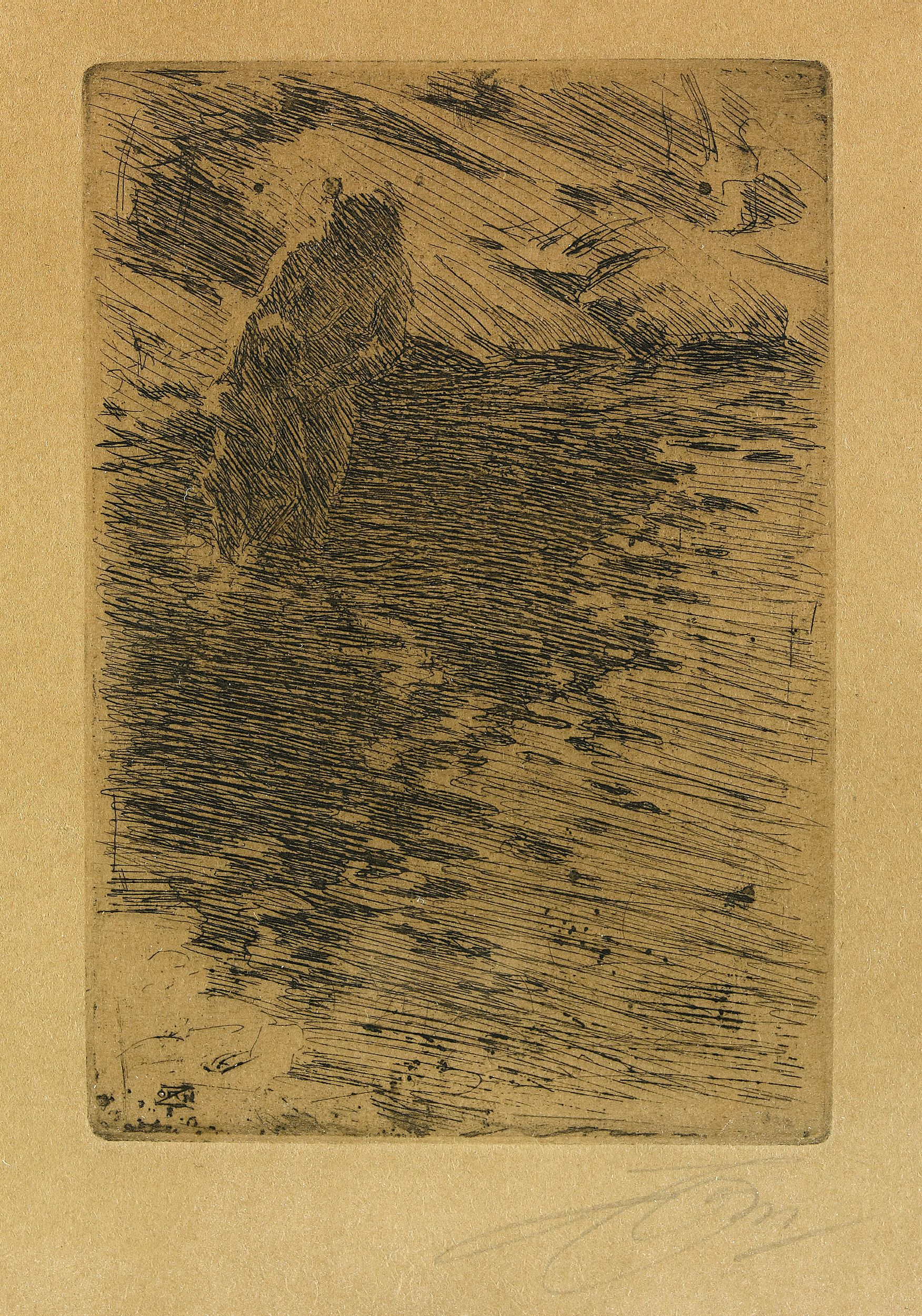
With her child, 1890 etching, 12.5 cm × 8.7 cm (4.9 in × 3.4 in)

Ute (Outdoors), 1888, 133 cm × 197.5 cm (52.4 in × 77.8 in), Gothenburg Museum of Art
