= Orsa Municipality =

Orsa Municipality Orsa kommun
- Municipality
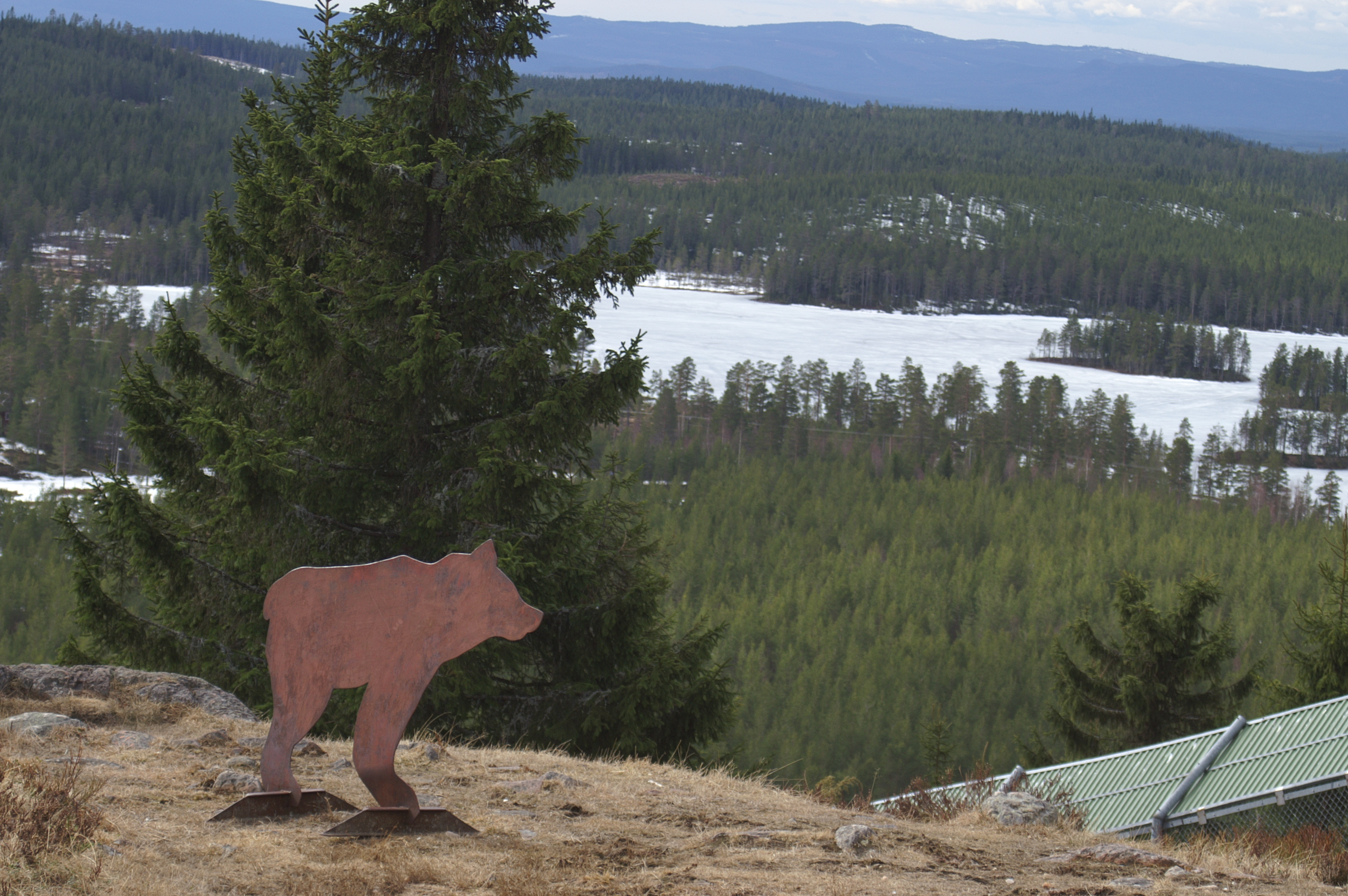
- View from the Grönklitt mountain

- Coat of arms

- Coordinates: 61°07′N 14°37′E
- Country: Sweden
- County: Dalarna County
- Seat: Orsa

Area
  - Total: 1,797.39 km^{2} (693.98 sq mi)
  - Land: 1,730.85 km^{2} (668.28 sq mi)
  - Water: 66.54 km^{2} (25.69 sq mi)
- Area as of 1 January 2014.

Population (30 June 2025)
  - Total: 6,874
  - Density: 3.971/km^{2} (10.29/sq mi)
- Time zone: UTC+1 (CET)
  - Summer (DST): UTC+2 (CEST)
- ISO 3166 code: SE
- Province: Dalarna
- Municipal code: 2034
- Website: www.orsa.se
- Density is calculated using land area only.

Orsa Municipality (Swedish: Orsa kommun) is a municipality in Dalarna County in central Sweden. Its seat is located in the town of Orsa.

Orsa is one of a few municipalities in Sweden which has not been amalgamated, but retains its area from the time it was instituted as a municipal entity in 1863.

== Geography ==
The town of Orsa is located on the north-eastern shore of the 53 square kilometres (20 sq mi) large Lake Orsa (Orsasjön). Through a southern water passage it is connected with one of Sweden's largest lakes: Siljan.

By the shores of Orsasjön the Orsa Camping was inaugurated in 1932. With a kilometer long sandy beach, it has received several awards for its quality and beauty, and is by some referred to as the Dalarna Riviera.

Nature sights include the Grönklitt mountain, that previously housed a notable bear park and skiing hill. The bear park was an enclosed area where not only bears but also wolves, lynx, siberian tigers and wolverines reside, and was the biggest bear park in northern Europe.

=== Localities ===
- Orsa (seat)
- Skattungbyn

== Demographics ==
This is a demographic table based on Orsa Municipality's electoral districts in the 2022 Swedish general election sourced from SVT's election platform, in turn taken from SCB official statistics.

In total there were 5,489 Swedish citizens of voting age resident in the municipality. 42.3 % voted for the left coalition and 55.7 % for the right coalition. Indicators are in percentage points except population totals and income.

Location	Residents	Citizen adults	Left vote	Right vote	Employed	Swedish parents	Foreign heritage	Income SEK	Degree
Location			%	%					
Orsa M	1,694	1,363	43.7	54.7	73	77	23	19,471	26
Orsa S	1,678	1,346	37.6	60.9	85	94	6	25,971	32
Orsa V	964	777	38.0	60.7	84	94	6	24,635	25
Orsa Ö	1,770	1,346	47.3	50.5	78	81	19	22,484	27
Skattungbyn-Kallmora	808	657	46.9	49.0	80	90	10	20,600	34
Source: SVT

== Riksdag elections ==
Year	%	Votes	V	S	MP	C	L	KD	M	SD	NyD	Left	Right
1973	86.2	4,407	6.2	37.3		40.4	5.0	1.3	8.8			43.6	56.0
1976	87.6	4,744	4.5	37.8		38.3	7.7	1.9	9.7			42.4	55.6
1979	85.6	4,759	5.4	40.4		29.0	6.9	1.9	15.5			45.8	51.3
1982	86.8	4,866	5.1	44.2	2.7	21.8	4.4	2.6	19.1			49.3	45.4
1985	85.3	4,826	5.7	42.4	3.0	19.4	12.6		16.9			48.1	48.9
1988	80.1	4,473	5.7	40.9	7.8	18.5	11.2	3.4	12.3			54.4	42.1
1991	83.0	4,624	5.4	35.2	4.7	14.4	7.4	7.8	14.3		10.3	40.5	43.8
1994	82.4	4,520	8.7	43.9	8.6	12.5	4.5	5.2	14.6		1.5	61.2	36.7
1998	78.8	4,225	17.5	33.7	6.1	7.3	2.9	15.2	14.9			57.3	40.3
2002	76.3	4,015	10.2	36.9	6.0	13.6	9.1	8.2	10.3	2.8		53.1	41.3
2006	80.3	4,253	6.9	34.8	5.1	15.6	4.2	5.5	21.0	3.2		46.9	46.3
2010	82.5	4,424	6.2	36.1	6.6	10.2	4.6	4.7	21.3	9.0		48.9	40.7
2014	84.8	4,607	5.7	33.1	5.0	10.7	2.8	3.2	14.5	20.8		43.7	31.1
2018	86.7	4,601	8.1	27.9	3.0	11.0	2.6	7.2	11.5	26.6		49.9	47.9
2022	84.7	4,598	5.3	26.8	3.7	6.5	2.8	6.6	13.4	32.9		42.3	55.7

== Notable natives ==
- Gustaf de Laval, 19th century inventor
- Orsa Spelmän, musicians/fiddlers
- Gunnar Myrdal, economist, politician, and Nobel laureate
- Kalle Moraeus, musician, TV personality
- Melker Jernberg, Melker Jernberg became president of Volvo Construction Equipment and member of the Volvo Group executive board on January 1, 2018
