= Springkällan =

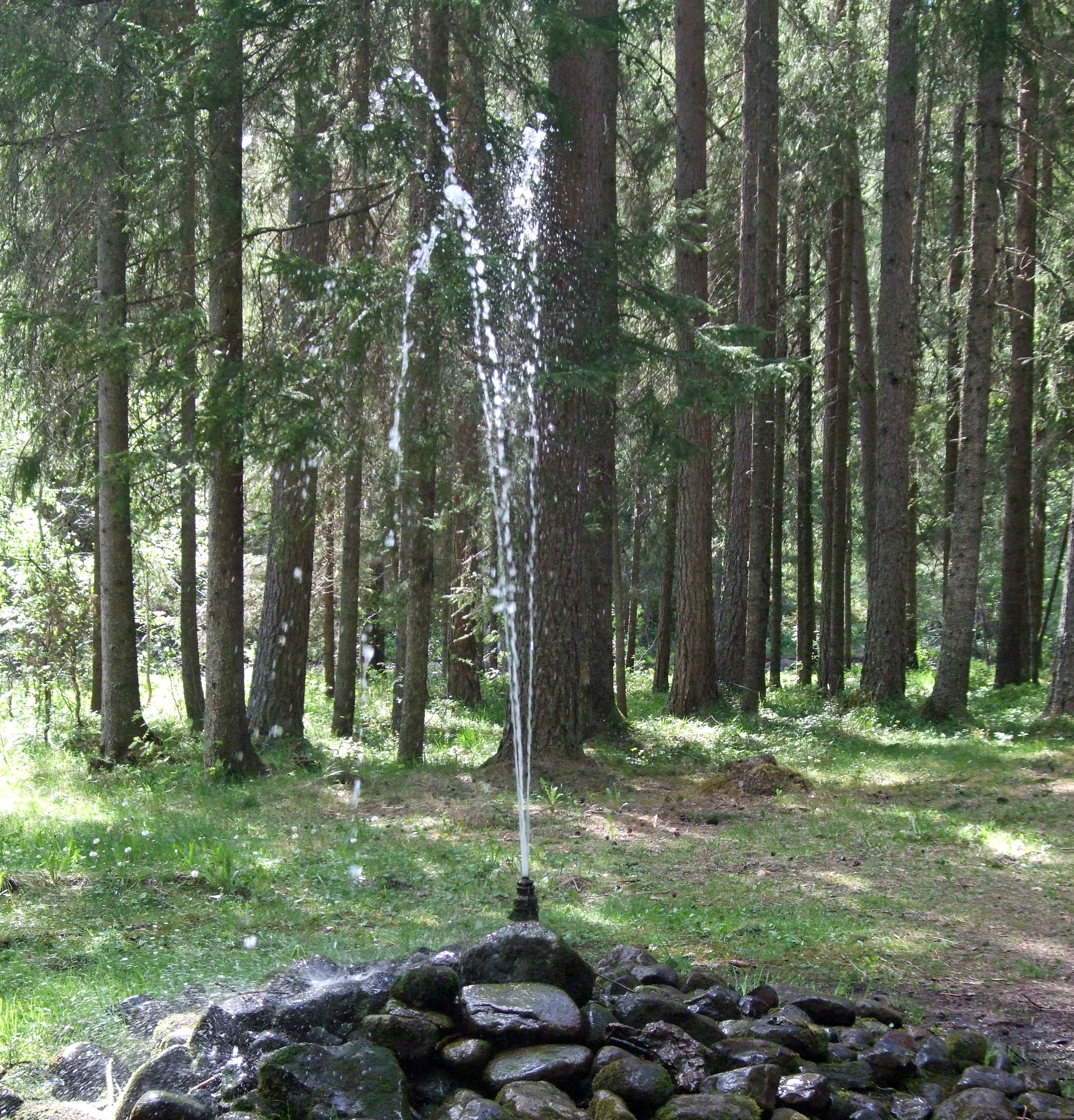
- View of Springkällan on early June 2012.
- Interactive map of Springkällan
- Location: Rättvik, Sweden
- Coordinates: 60°55′23.7″N 15°9′40.64″E
- Elevation: 180 m (590 ft)

Springkällan is a human-made artesian spring located in Enån nature reserve outside Rättvik, Sweden. The spring was created by accident in 1869 during an oil prospecting drilling in the Siljan Ring impact crater. The spring freezes in winter, creating an unusual pillar-like form of ice.
