= Orsa, Sweden =

Orsa
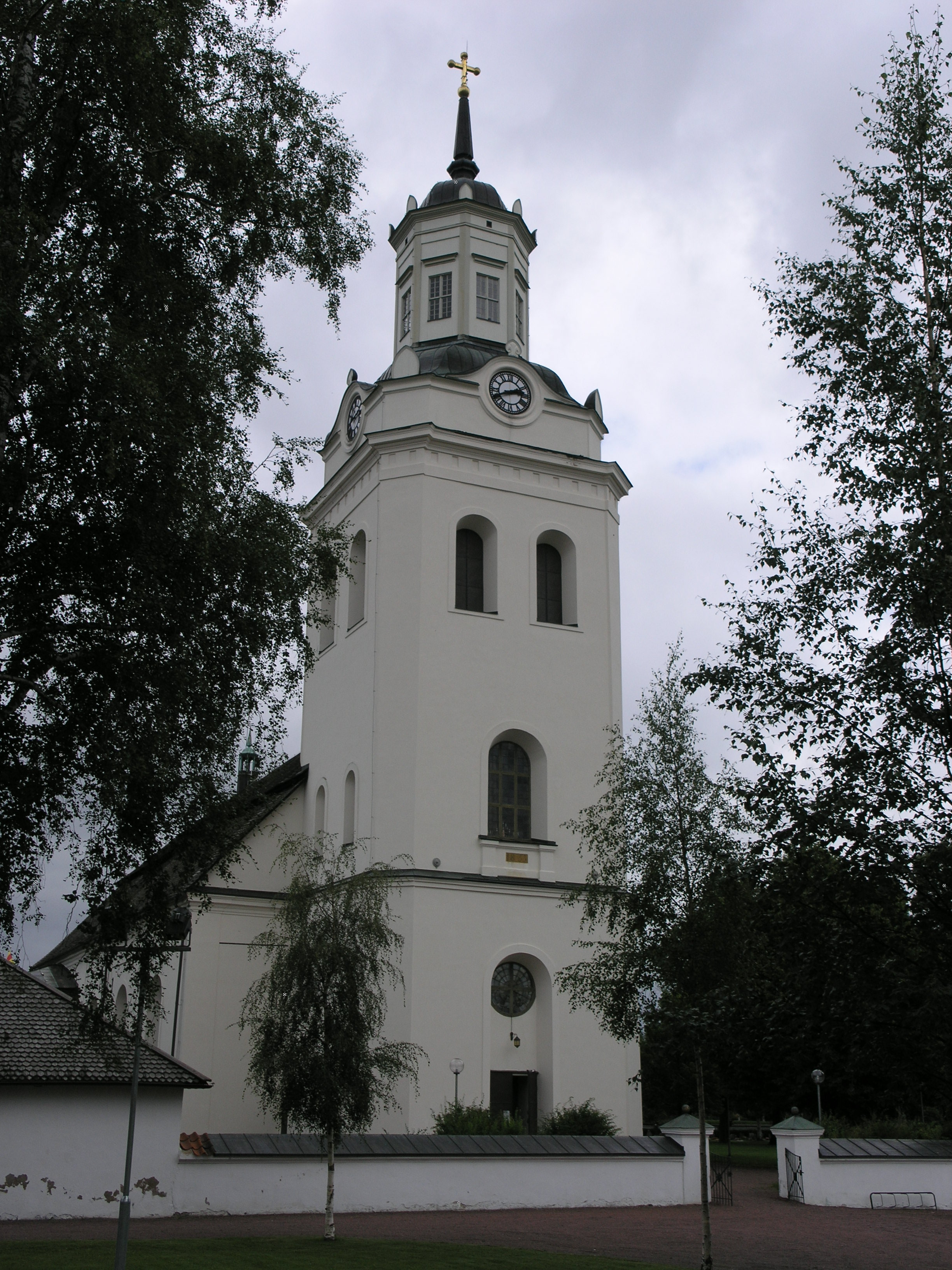
- Orsa Church

- Location within Dalarna Location within Sweden
- Coordinates: 61°07′N 14°37′E
- Country: Sweden
- Province: Dalarna
- County: Dalarna County
- Municipality: Orsa Municipality

Area
  - Total: 12.59 km^{2} (4.86 sq mi)

Population (31 December 2010)
  - Total: 5,308
  - Density: 422/km^{2} (1,090/sq mi)
- Time zone: UTC+1 (CET)
  - Summer (DST): UTC+2 (CEST)

Orsa (Swedish pronunciation: [ˈʊ̂ʂːa]) is a locality and the seat of Orsa Municipality, Dalarna County, Sweden, with 5,308 inhabitants (2010). It is located in the northern part of lake Siljan, about 15 kilometres (9 miles) north of the town Mora. Inlandsbanan and European route E45 run through the town and the railroad Bollnäs-Orsa connects.

== Nature ==
The southern parts of Orsa are characterized by the Siljan Ring, a ring of lakes and rivers in northern Dalarna formed by the major meteorite strike 365 million years ago. In central Orsa, at the outflow of river Oreälven a sand bank has been built up, enjoyed by thousands of tourists and residents of Orsa. The large forests begin just north of the town of Orsa, with the sparsely populated Orsa Finnmark being the most notable, and to which many Finns to emigrated during the 17th century.

== Notable places ==
- Orsa Spelmän, (Orsa folklore musicians) which Benny Andersson from ABBA used to play with.
- Skattungbyn a small village with a view over the river Oreälven.
- Orsayran (The Orsa Dizzying) a summer music festival, each Wednesday in July.
- Orsa slipstensmuseum a museum of the making of the famous grindstones of Orsa, located in Mässbacken.
- Helvetesfallet and Storstupet, waterfalls in river Ämån 20 km (12 miles) north of Orsa
- Orsa Grönklitt. A wilderness center with wilderness activities, bear and animal park during the summer and a ski resort during the winter.

== Orsamål dialect ==
About 500 people speak the Orsamål dialect, a dialect of Dalecarlian, also called Old Swedish in Minnesota.

== Climate ==
Climate data for Mora (2002–2020 averages); extremes since 1941; snow depth from Orsa
Month	Jan	Feb	Mar	Apr	May	Jun	Jul	Aug	Sep	Oct	Nov	Dec	Year
Record high °C (°F)	10.5 (50.9)	11.5 (52.7)	17.3 (63.1)	26.4 (79.5)	28.0 (82.4)	32.4 (90.3)	31.7 (89.1)	33.0 (91.4)	25.4 (77.7)	21.6 (70.9)	15.1 (59.2)	10.9 (51.6)	33.0 (91.4)
Mean maximum °C (°F)	5.6 (42.1)	6.4 (43.5)	12.4 (54.3)	18.0 (64.4)	24.3 (75.7)	27.0 (80.6)	28.1 (82.6)	26.3 (79.3)	21.4 (70.5)	15.5 (59.9)	10.3 (50.5)	6.2 (43.2)	29.4 (84.9)
Mean daily maximum °C (°F)	−2.0 (28.4)	−0.7 (30.7)	4.0 (39.2)	10.4 (50.7)	15.8 (60.4)	20.1 (68.2)	22.2 (72.0)	20.3 (68.5)	15.6 (60.1)	8.4 (47.1)	3.1 (37.6)	−0.3 (31.5)	9.7 (49.5)
Daily mean °C (°F)	−5.5 (22.1)	−4.5 (23.9)	−0.8 (30.6)	4.7 (40.5)	9.9 (49.8)	14.2 (57.6)	16.5 (61.7)	15.0 (59.0)	10.9 (51.6)	4.8 (40.6)	0.3 (32.5)	−3.6 (25.5)	5.2 (41.3)
Mean daily minimum °C (°F)	−9.0 (15.8)	−8.2 (17.2)	−5.5 (22.1)	−1.0 (30.2)	3.9 (39.0)	8.3 (46.9)	10.7 (51.3)	9.7 (49.5)	6.2 (43.2)	1.1 (34.0)	−2.5 (27.5)	−6.8 (19.8)	0.6 (33.0)
Mean minimum °C (°F)	−22.9 (−9.2)	−21.9 (−7.4)	−17.3 (0.9)	−8.0 (17.6)	−3.3 (26.1)	1.8 (35.2)	4.6 (40.3)	2.1 (35.8)	−1.4 (29.5)	−7.7 (18.1)	−12.7 (9.1)	−19.4 (−2.9)	−25.8 (−14.4)
Record low °C (°F)	−39.7 (−39.5)	−40.5 (−40.9)	−30.6 (−23.1)	−22.0 (−7.6)	−8.6 (16.5)	−3.4 (25.9)	2.5 (36.5)	−2.2 (28.0)	−8.8 (16.2)	−16.6 (2.1)	−27.4 (−17.3)	−35.0 (−31.0)	−40.5 (−40.9)
Average precipitation mm (inches)	36.0 (1.42)	25.6 (1.01)	26.2 (1.03)	26.2 (1.03)	57.7 (2.27)	78.5 (3.09)	84.3 (3.32)	80.0 (3.15)	45.0 (1.77)	57.5 (2.26)	44.2 (1.74)	34.9 (1.37)	596.1 (23.46)
Average extreme snow depth cm (inches)	34 (13)	41 (16)	41 (16)	21 (8.3)	1 (0.4)	0 (0)	0 (0)	0 (0)	0 (0)	4 (1.6)	10 (3.9)	21 (8.3)	48 (19)
Source 1: SMHI Open Data
Source 2: SMHI climate data 2002–2020

== International relations ==
=== Twin towns – Sister cities ===
Orsa is twinned with:

- Aalborg, Denmark
