= Rättvik Arena =

Indoor bandy venue in Rättvik, Sweden

Coordinates: 60.8975°N 15.1224°E

- Interactive map of Rättvik Arena
- Location: Rättvik, Sweden
- Owner: Rättvik Municipality
- Capacity: 2 000 (bandy games)
- Type: indoor bandy venue

Construction
- Opened: 13 June 2010

Tenant
- IFK Rättvik

Rättvik Arena is an indoor bandy venue and event arena for music and culture in Rättvik, Dalarna County, Sweden, which officially opened on 13 June 2010 with performances by music artists like Kalle Moraeus and Ola Svensson. The arena was completed already by November 2009.

It was originally planned to be taken into use for the 2009/2010 season.
