= Orsa Church =

Coordinates: 61°07′12″N 14°36′52.3″E

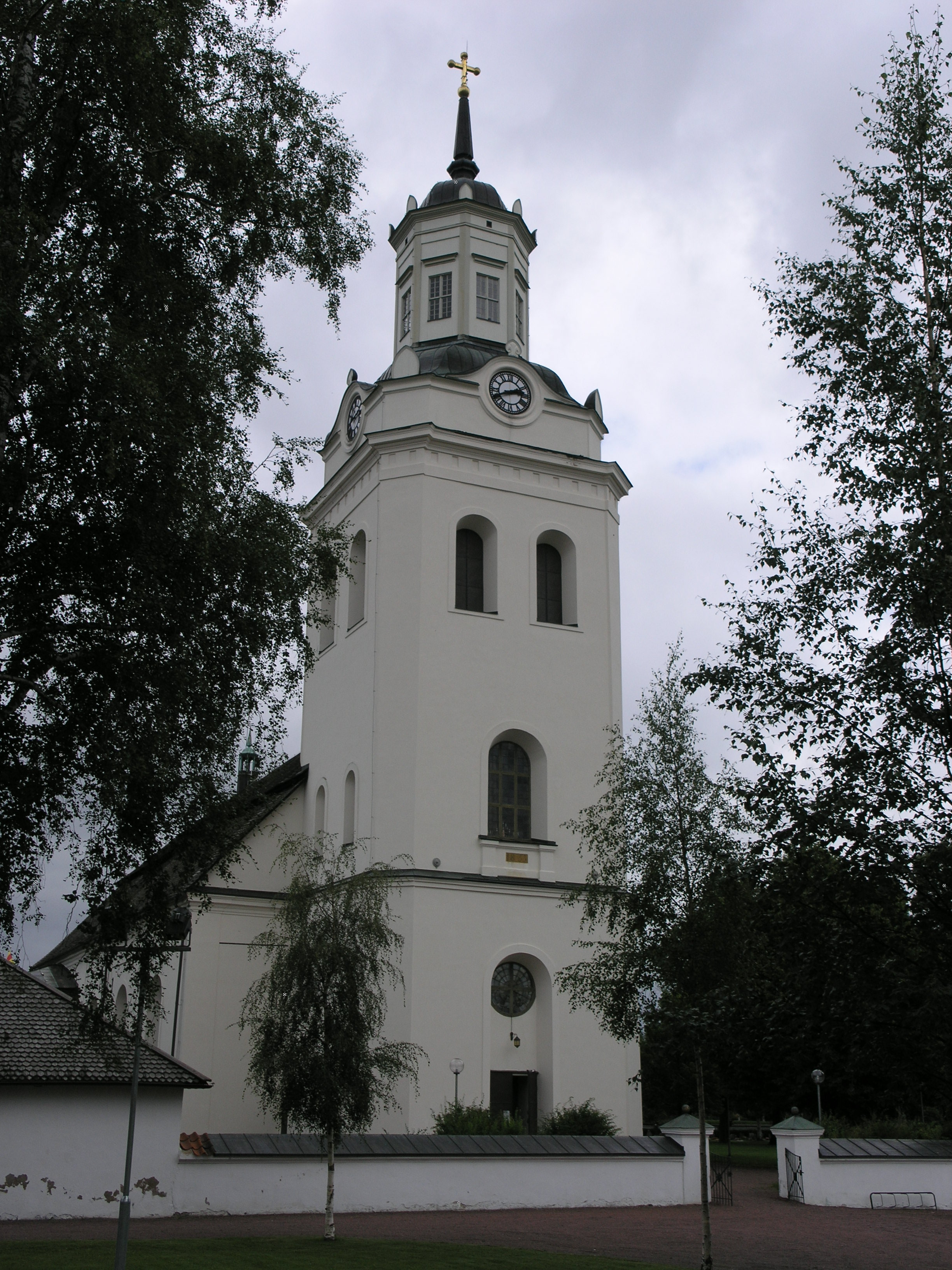
Orsa Church in July 2005

Orsa Church (Swedish: Orsa kyrka) is a church of the Diocese of Västerås. It is located in the center of Orsa, Sweden.

== History ==
The 1st stone church was built during the 13th century and maybe it replaced an old stave church. Around 1300 the church was built out in east direction and then maybe the sacristy came. In the middle of the 14th century the church was beamed out to the present beam. In the end of the 15th century it was built out to the present size, except the choir. In 1607 they planned to build the bell tower at the western part of the church, and it was finished in 1639, but demolished and replaced by a new tower which was built in 1853, according to drawings by architect Ludvig Hawerman. The present choirs came when the church was rebuilt 1752–55. In 1979 the church was restored; the roof was rebuilt and a little museum was built in one of the tower rooms. The fore part of the floor was replaced by new limestone floor and the rest of the floor is made of sandstone from Orsa. At the restoration they found remains of two old floors made of stone and brick.

== Sources ==
- Orsa Church on Svenska kyrkan's website
