= Orsa Grönklitt =

Coordinates: 61°12′27″N 14°32′25″E

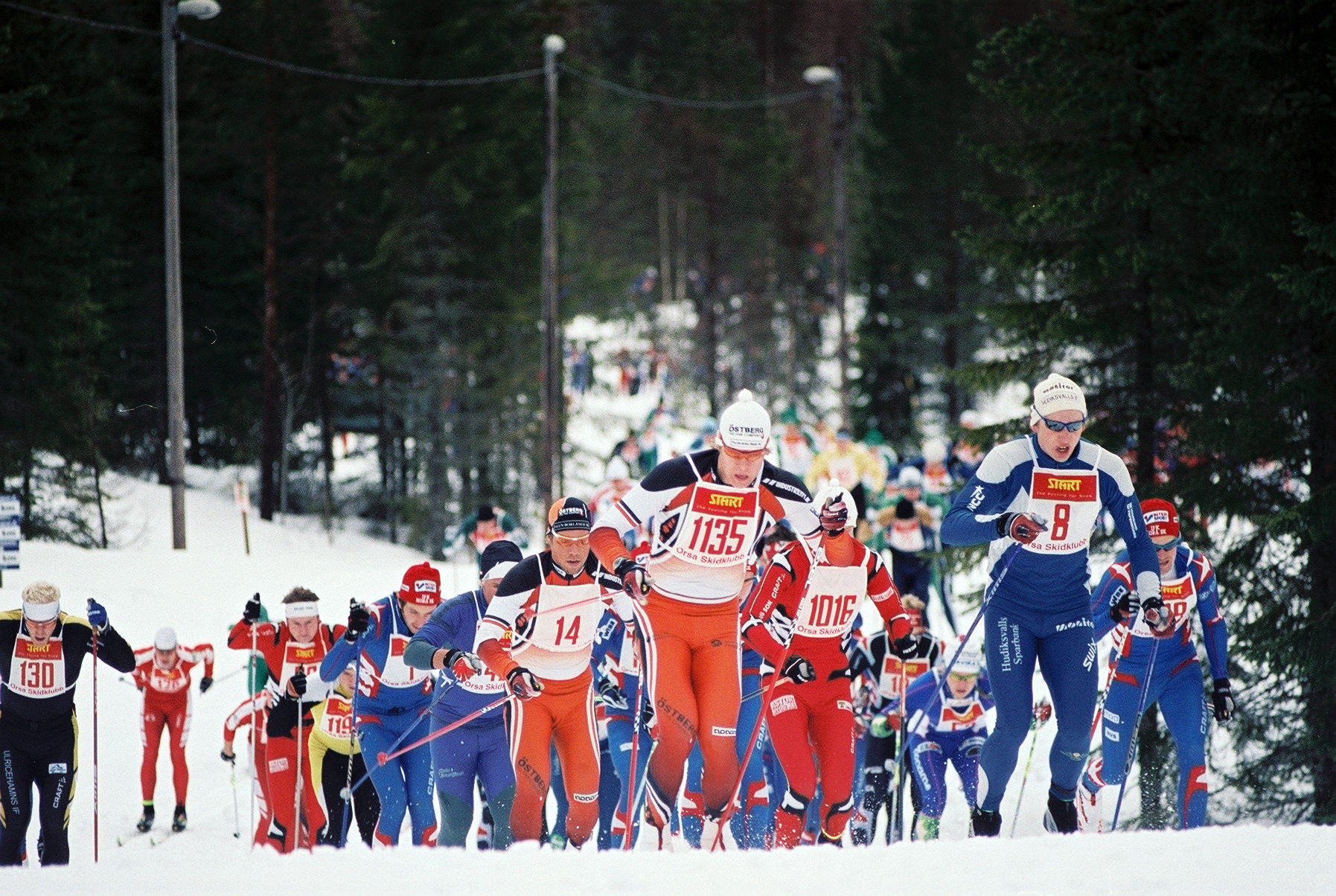
Orsa Grönklitt Ski Marathon, March 5, 2008

Orsa Grönklitt is an area noted for its ski resort (both alpine and cross-country), and holiday home, camping and conference facilities, located 350 km (220 mi) from Stockholm in the municipality of Orsa. During the winter months it is a major ski resort and hosts numerous competitions including a skiing marathon. The Orsa Grönklitt Ski Centre offers 22 runs. Orsa Grönklitt was formerly also the site of wildlife park (closed 2022) with predators such as large cats and bears.
