= Rättvik Municipality =

Rättvik Municipality Rättviks kommun
- Municipality
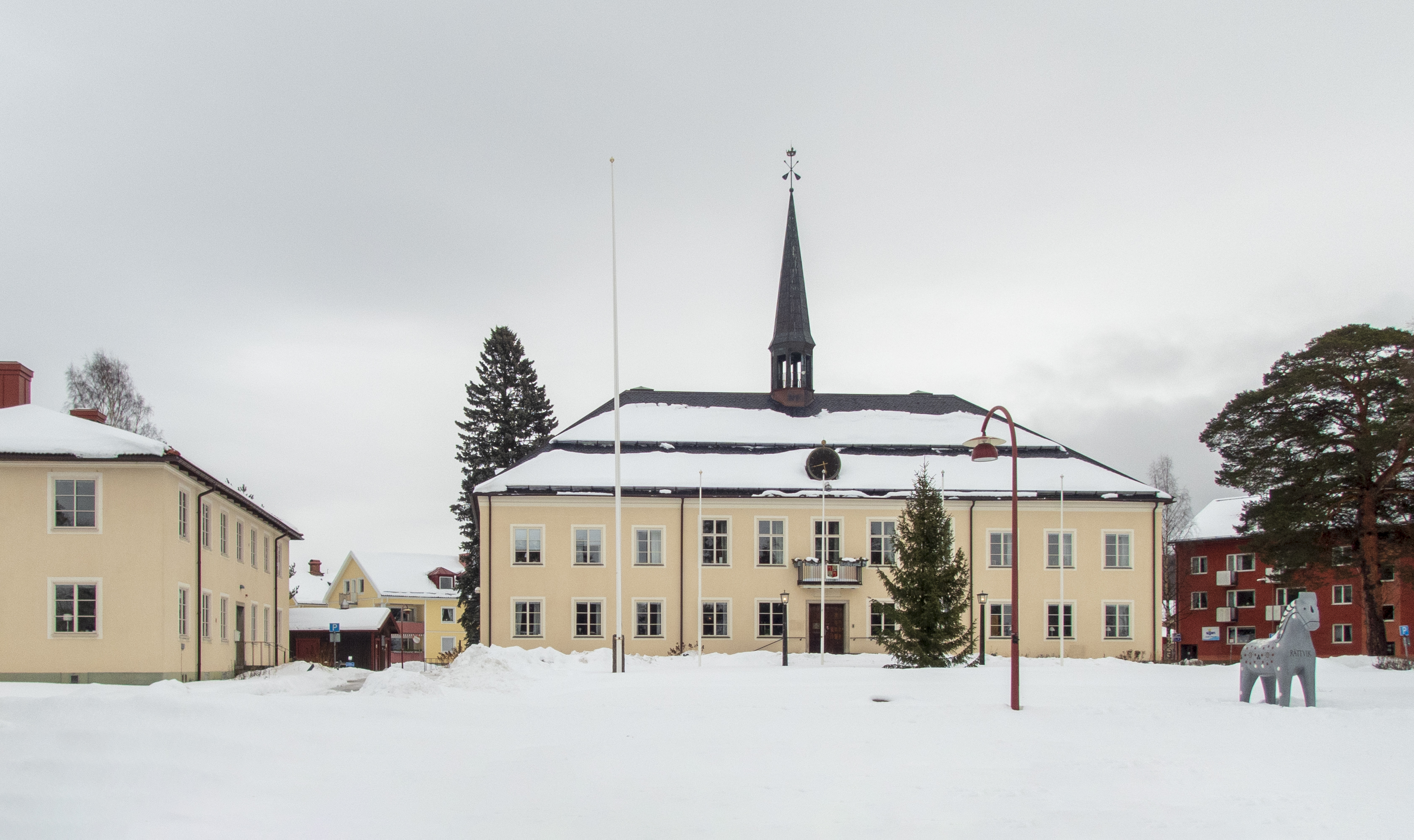
- Rättvik town hall

- Coat of arms

- Coordinates: 60°53′N 15°08′E
- Country: Sweden
- County: Dalarna County
- Seat: Rättvik

Area
  - Total: 2,137.79 km^{2} (825.41 sq mi)
  - Land: 1,920.66 km^{2} (741.57 sq mi)
  - Water: 217.13 km^{2} (83.83 sq mi)
- Area as of 1 January 2014.

Population (30 June 2025)
  - Total: 11,018
  - Density: 5.7366/km^{2} (14.858/sq mi)
- Time zone: UTC+1 (CET)
  - Summer (DST): UTC+2 (CEST)
- ISO 3166 code: SE
- Province: Dalarna
- Municipal code: 2031
- Website: www.rattvik.se
- Density is calculated using land area only.

Rättvik Municipality (Swedish: Rättviks kommun) is a municipality in Dalarna County in central Sweden. Its seat is located in the town of Rättvik.

In 1963 the municipality was reunited with Boda, which had been detached from it in 1875, and in 1974 Ore was added, thus forming the present municipality.

== Geography ==
Rättvik municipality is situated in the middle of Sweden in the province of Dalarna, in between the three Swedish cities Borlänge, Falun and Mora.

It is located in a traditional forest and agriculture environment, which is how most of Sweden looked in the 19th century and earlier. Nowadays, its culture also attracts a significant number of tourists.

The area near Rättvik municipality has the highest population of brown bears in Sweden.

== Town ==
The contiguous urban area, or locality of Rättvik lies on Lake Siljan, and had 4,588 inhabitants in 2005; it is widely known for its old tradition of folkmusic and the beauty of the surroundings close to Lake Siljan; it is included on many tours of Sweden as an example of a traditional Swedish and Scandinavian way of living.

Every year the folk music festival "Music at Siljan" is held in Rättvik, by the shores of Siljan.

The annual summer opera festival, the Dalhalla Opera, takes place 7 km north of the town in an open-air theatre located in a former limestone quarry.

The bandy club IFK Rättvik has an indoor arena.

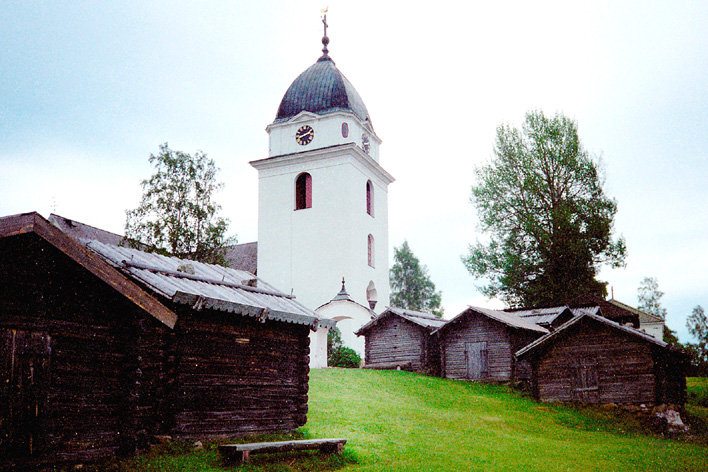
Rättvik's church

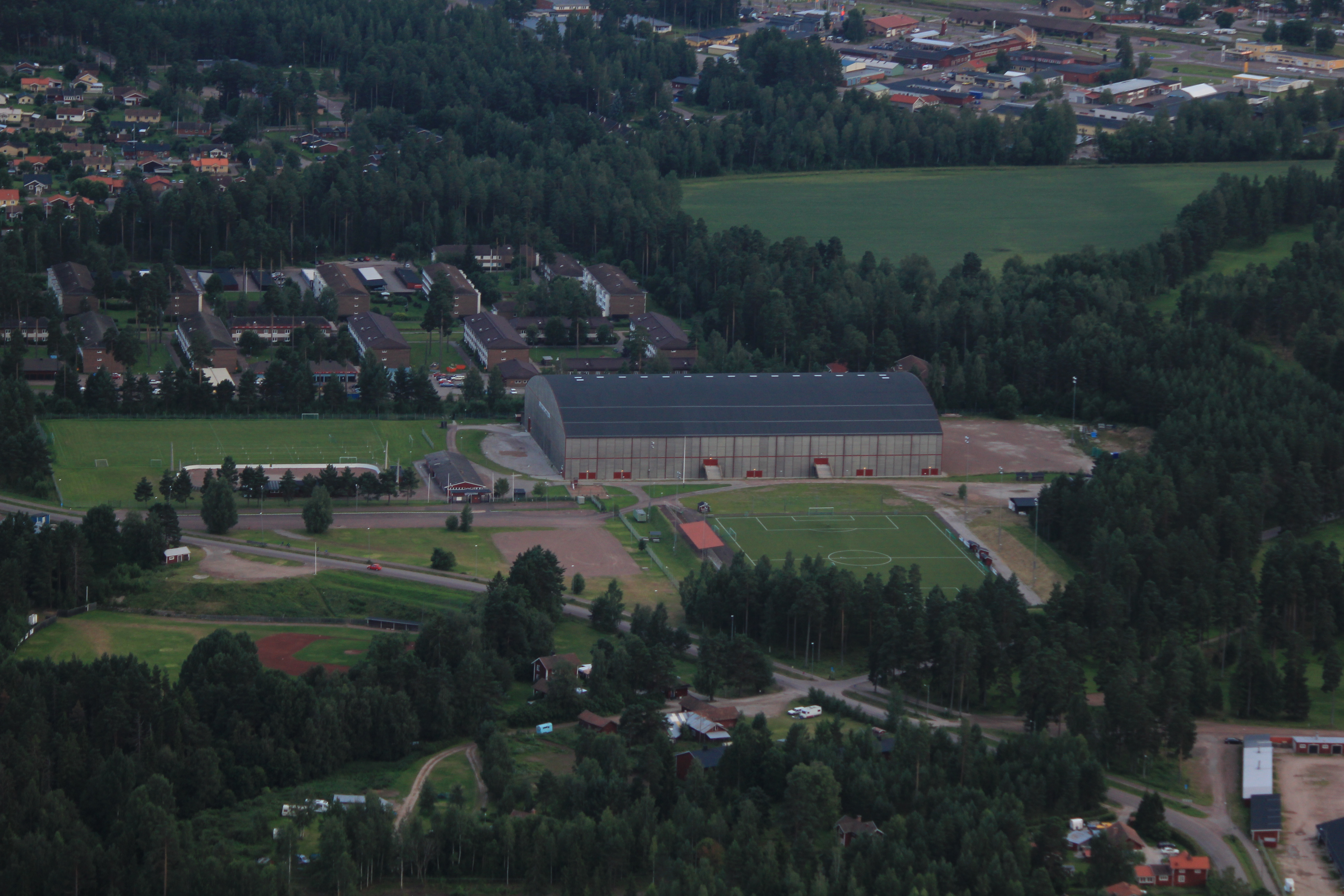
IFK Rättvik's bandy arena

== Demographics ==
This is a demographic table based on Rättvik Municipality's electoral districts in the 2022 Swedish general election sourced from SVT's election platform, in turn taken from SCB official statistics.

Residents include everyone registered as living in the district, regardless of age or citizenship status. Valid voters indicate Swedish citizens above the age of 18 who therefore can vote in general elections. Left vote and right vote indicate the result between the two major blocs in said district in the 2022 general election. Employment indicates the share of people between the ages of 20 and 64 who are working taxpayers. Foreign background is defined as residents either born abroad or with two parents born outside of Sweden. Median income is the received monthly income through either employment, capital gains or social grants for the median adult above 20, also including pensioners in Swedish kronor. The section about college graduates indicates any degree accumulated after high school.

In total there were 9,064 Swedish citizens of voting age resident in the municipality. 42.8 % voted for the left coalition and 55.8 % for the right coalition. Indicators are in percentage points except population totals and income.

Location	Residents	Citizen adults	Left vote	Right vote	Employed	Swedish parents	Foreign heritage	Income SEK	Degree
Location			%	%					
Boda-Gärdsjö	1,922	1,607	38.3	61.0	85	94	6	23,170	24
Ore	1,086	902	36.9	61.9	79	89	11	20,929	24
Rättvik C	1,915	1,637	46.3	51.9	78	90	10	20,336	31
Rättvik S	2,335	1,837	43.3	55.3	85	94	6	27,653	44
Rättvik V	1,935	1,555	43.2	55.9	81	88	12	21,089	25
Vikarbyn	1,903	1,526	46.8	51.2	87	91	9	24,539	35
Source: SVT

== Riksdag elections ==
Year	%	Votes	V	S	MP	C	L	KD	M	SD	NyD	Left	Right
1973	84.9	6,867	4.5	36.6		39.8	8.0	2.5	8.5			41.1	56.2
1976	86.5	7,202	3.7	34.4		38.7	8.9	1.4	12.6			38.1	60.2
1979	85.1	7,312	4.0	36.0		33.0	7.9	1.6	17.0			40.0	57.9
1982	85.4	7,329	3.8	37.6	2.3	27.9	5.7	1.8	20.8			41.4	54.4
1985	84.0	7,318	3.6	36.8	1.8	22.9	15.6		19.3			40.3	57.8
1988	78.0	6,778	4.2	37.6	6.1	19.4	13.0	4.9	14.5			47.9	46.9
1991	80.5	7,096	2.9	33.1	3.6	13.6	8.2	8.4	18.5		10.3	36.0	48.7
1994	79.7	7,014	4.9	42.3	6.8	12.6	7.0	4.2	19.9		1.8	53.9	43.7
1998	76.4	6,570	11.0	33.1	5.1	8.7	5.0	13.0	19.8			49.2	46.5
2002	76.4	6,497	6.7	38.9	4.5	14.6	11.3	8.1	12.8	0.8		50.2	46.8
2006	79.0	6,776	4.1	36.0	4.1	15.3	5.7	5.5	22.2	2.5		44.3	48.7
2010	81.8	7,159	3.7	34.1	6.2	11.2	5.1	4.9	26.5	6.1		44.0	47.7
2014	84.6	7,458	4.5	31.7	4.8	10.2	3.6	3.4	21.4	17.0		41.0	38.6
2018	87.2	7,644	6.1	26.7	3.0	12.2	3.1	7.1	16.8	23.4		48.0	50.4
2022	86.0	7,6786	3.7	28.6	3.7	6.9	2.6	7.4	16.5	29.2		42.8	55.8

== Resources ==
- Nationalencyklopedin
