= Rättvik Church =

Coordinates: 60.8909°N 15.0964°E

- Rättviks kyrka
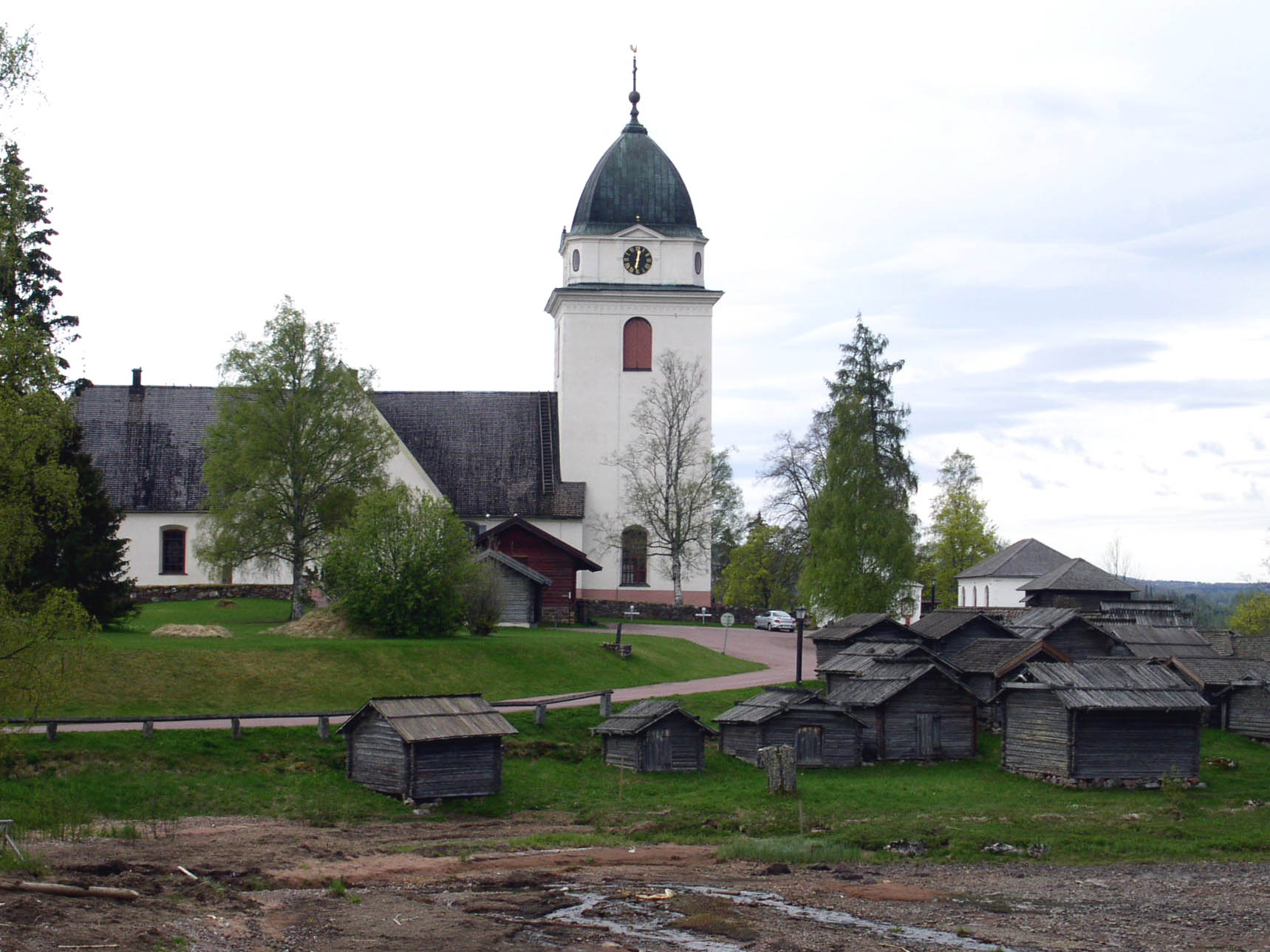
- Rättvik Church in May 2007. Church stables in the foreground.
- Rättvik Church
- Location: Rättvik
- Country: Sweden
- Denomination: Church of Sweden

Administration
- Diocese: Västerås
- Parish: Rättvik

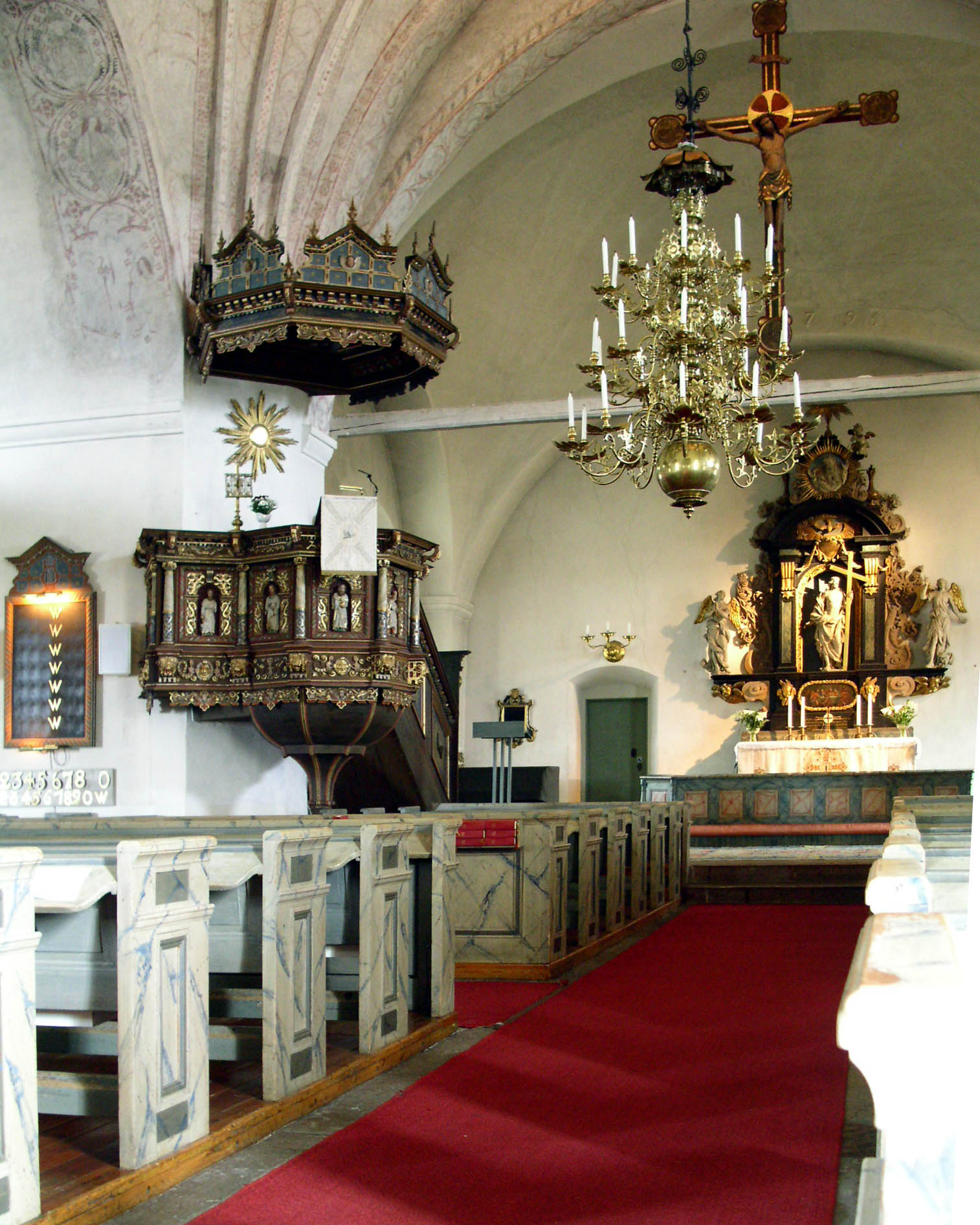
Inside Rättvik Church

Rättvik Church (Swedish: Rättviks kyrka) is a church building in Rättvik in Sweden. It belongs to Rättvik Parish of the Church of Sweden.
