= Siljan Ring =

Impact structure in the country of Sweden

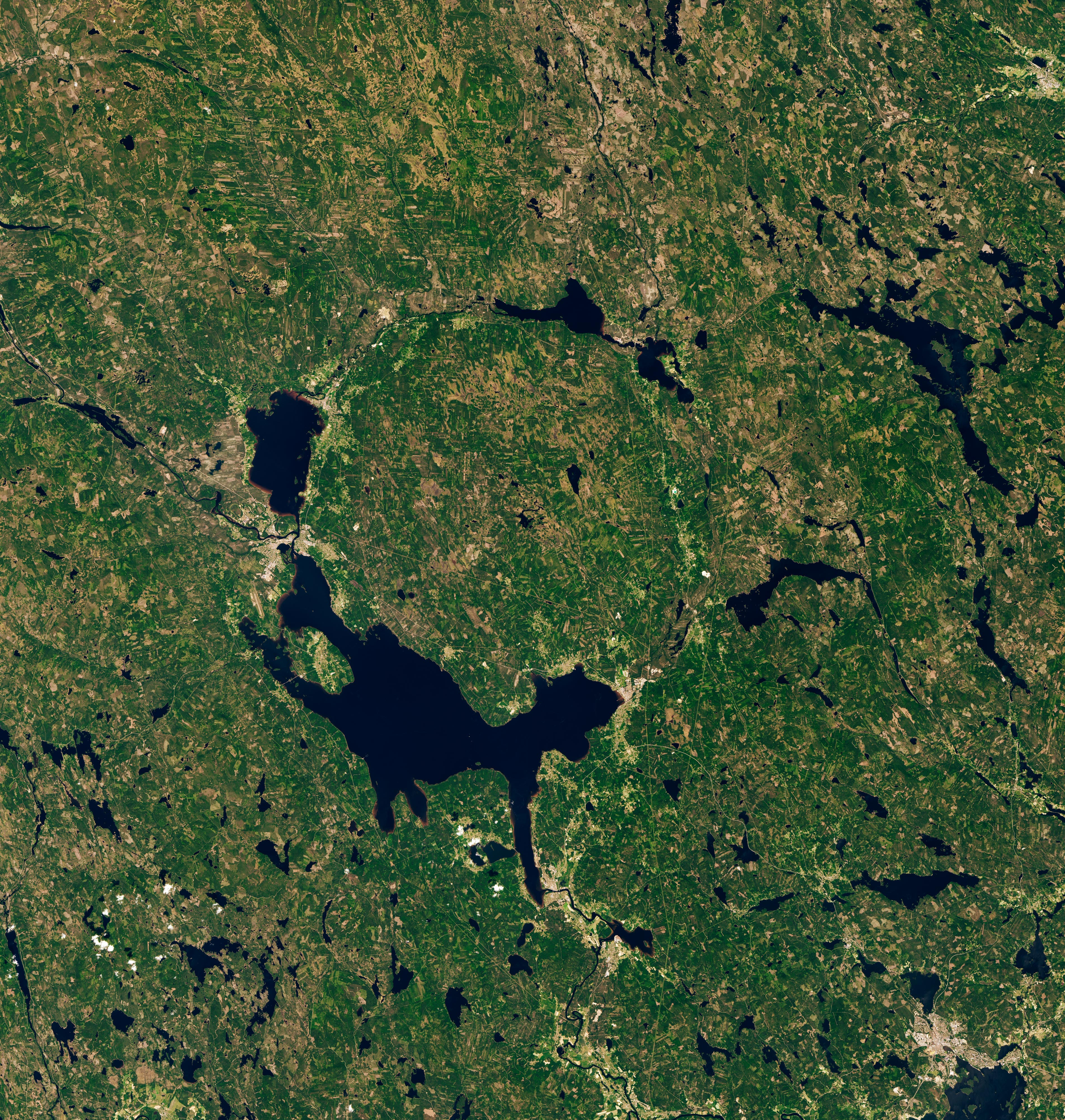
- Satellite photo of the Siljan Ring. Lake Siljan takes up a large part of the southwestern edge of the now much-eroded crater.

- Location within Sweden
- Location: Dalarna, Sweden; 61.04°N 14.92°E

Impact crater structure
- Confidence: Confirmed
- Diameter: 52 km (32 mi)
- Age: 376.8 ± 1.7 Ma; Frasnian
- Exposed: Yes
- Drilled: Yes

The Siljan Ring (Swedish: Siljansringen) is a prehistoric impact structure in Dalarna, central Sweden. It is one of the 15 largest known impact structures on Earth and the largest in Europe, with a diameter of about 52 kilometres (32 mi). The impact that created the Siljan Ring occurred when a meteorite collided with the Earth's surface during the Devonian period. The exact timing of the impact has been estimated at 376.8 ± 1.7 Ma or at 377 ± 2 Ma. This impact has been proposed as a cause of the first Devonian extinction, the Kellwasser Event or Late Frasnian extinction, due to it being believed by some researchers to coincide around the time of the Kellwasser event at 376.1 Ma ± 1.6 Ma, although the timing of this extinction event has since been pushed forward to 371.93–371.78 Ma. The effects of the impact can clearly be seen in the bedrock in the area. The Cambrian, Ordovician and Silurian sedimentary rocks deformed by the impact are rich in fossils.

The area around the Siljan Ring has been the site of recent prospecting for oil and natural gas, though none of the projects has so far been commercially viable. There are large deposits of lead and zinc near Boda at the eastern edge of the Ring.

There are several lakes in the vicinity, the largest of which is Siljan on the south-southwestern edge of the crater, with the smaller Orsa Lake to the west and Skattungen and Ore on the northeastern margin.

== Geology ==
The Siljan Ring consists of an annular outcrop of Lower Paleozoic sedimentary rocks within Proterozoic granites of the Dala series.

The impact event is estimated to have had an energy of 1.94 × 10^{22} J, with the diameter of the impactor being 5 km.

=== Basement rocks ===
In Dalarna, the basement rocks consist of granites dated as 1.6 billion years old, putting them at the boundary between the Paleoproterozoic and the Mesoproterozoic. They were emplaced shortly after the Svecokarelian orogeny.

=== Sedimentary rocks ===
The oldest sedimentary rocks that outcrop in the Siljan area are of Ordovician age. The sequence is dominated by limestone formations with one prominent black shale, the Fjäcka Shale, which is bituminous and has generated petroleum, sourcing the oil found in limestone cavities in the same area. The Ordovician sequence is overlain by rocks of the Llandovery Series (Lower Silurian).

=== Glaciation ===
During the last ice age the area was covered by a thick icesheet. The bedrock was sculpted by the ice, with the softer Palaeozoic sedimentary rocks being preferentially eroded. These erosional hollows are now occupied by lakes Siljan, Orsa, Skattungen and Ore.

== Oil and gas prospecting ==
In accordance with theories about abiogenic petroleum (that hydrocarbons can be formed without involving material from dead plants and animals), astrophysicist Thomas Gold suggested that there might be major deposits of oil and natural gas in the area. Drilling was carried out in the late 1980s and early 1990s but proved inconclusive. Drilling for natural gas was resumed in the late 2000s and continued as of mid-2012. The scientific premise for prospecting of this sort is based on the work of physicist Vladimir Kutcherov, who is cooperating with Igrene, the company financing the drilling operations. In 2019, a study of gases and secondary minerals revealed that long-term microbial methanogenesis and methane oxidation have occurred deep within the fracture system of the crater (for at least 80 million years). and in 2021 a study revealed findings of fossilized anaerobic fungi that had lived in consortium with methanogens deep in the crater.. In 2025, two studies focused on the microbial communities of deep groundwaters in the crater rim concluded that microbial methanogenesis is an active processes and what communities and metabolic pathways that are involved.
