= Boda, Sweden =

Boda
- Location within Dalarna Location within Sweden
- Coordinates: 61°01′N 15°13′E
- Country: Sweden
- Province: Dalarna
- County: Dalarna County
- Municipality: Rättvik Municipality

Area
  - Total: 2.11 km^{2} (0.81 sq mi)

Population (31 December 2010)
  - Total: 541
  - Density: 257/km^{2} (670/sq mi)
- Time zone: UTC+1 (CET)
  - Summer (DST): UTC+2 (CEST)
- Climate: Dfc

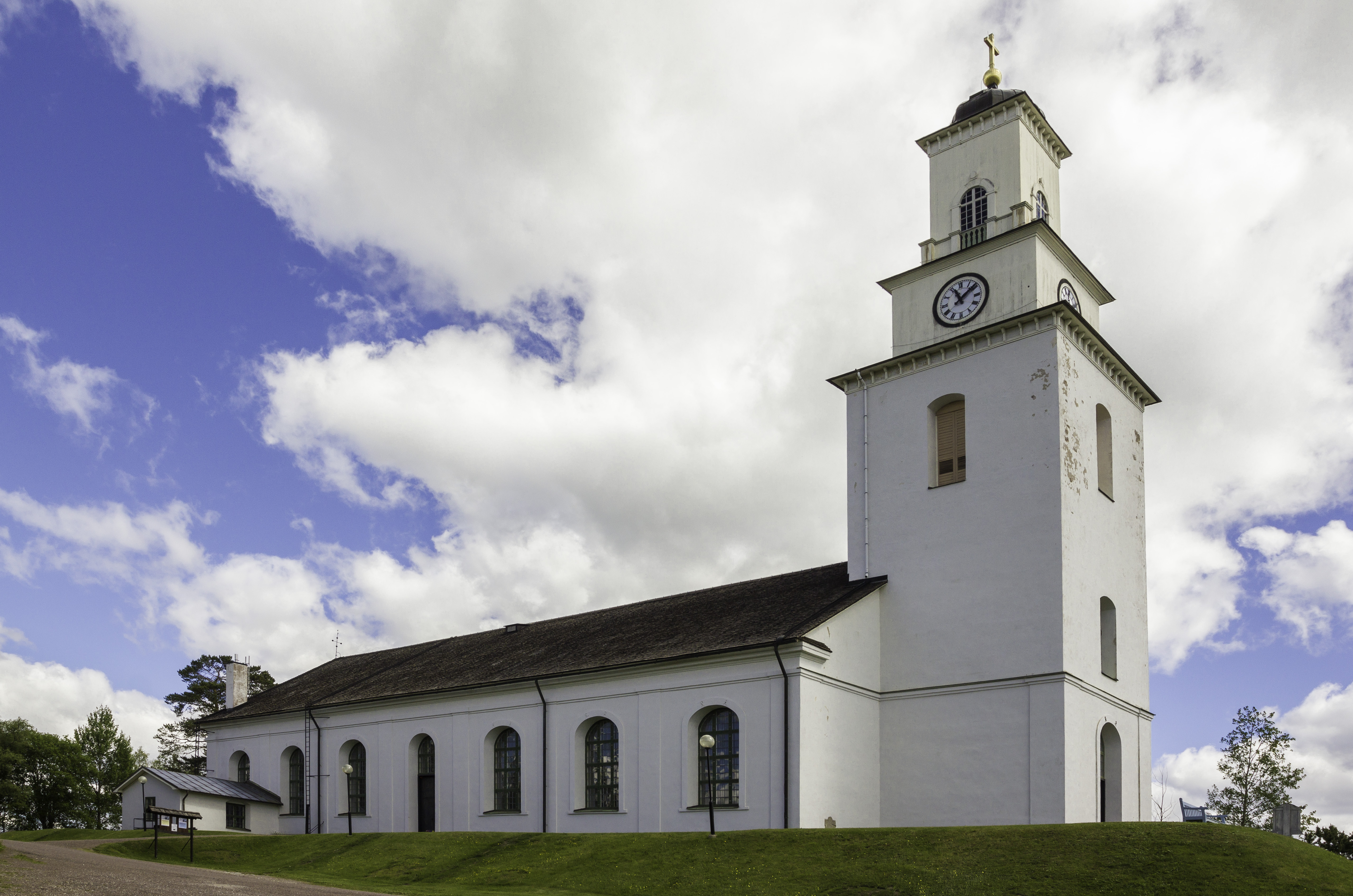
Boda church

Boda is a locality situated in Rättvik Municipality, Dalarna County, Sweden with 525 inhabitants in 2023.

The Styggforsen waterfall is located within this region.
