= Siljan (lake) =

Lake in Sweden

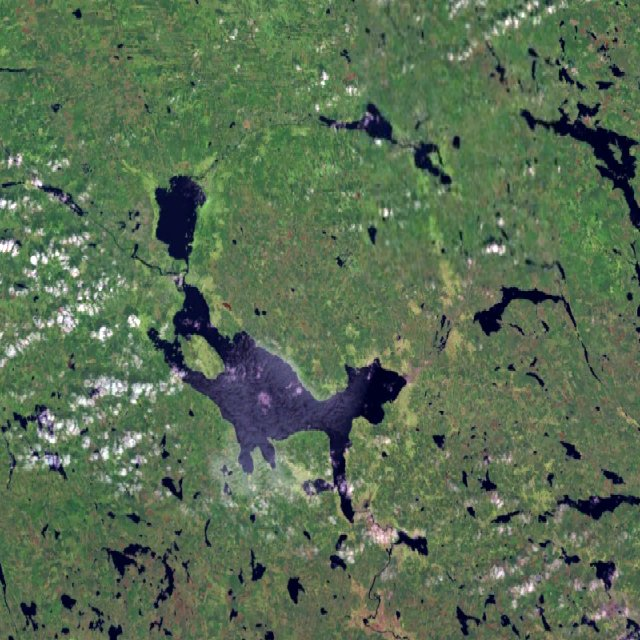
- Landsat 7 satellite image

- Location within Dalarna
- Coordinates: 60°51′N 14°48′E
- Basin countries: Sweden
- Surface area: 354 km^{2} (137 sq mi) (including adjacent lakes)
- Max. depth: 134 m (440 ft)
- Water volume: 42 km^{3} (34×10^{6} acre⋅ft)
- Surface elevation: 161 m (528 ft)
- Settlements: Leksand, Mora, Rättvik

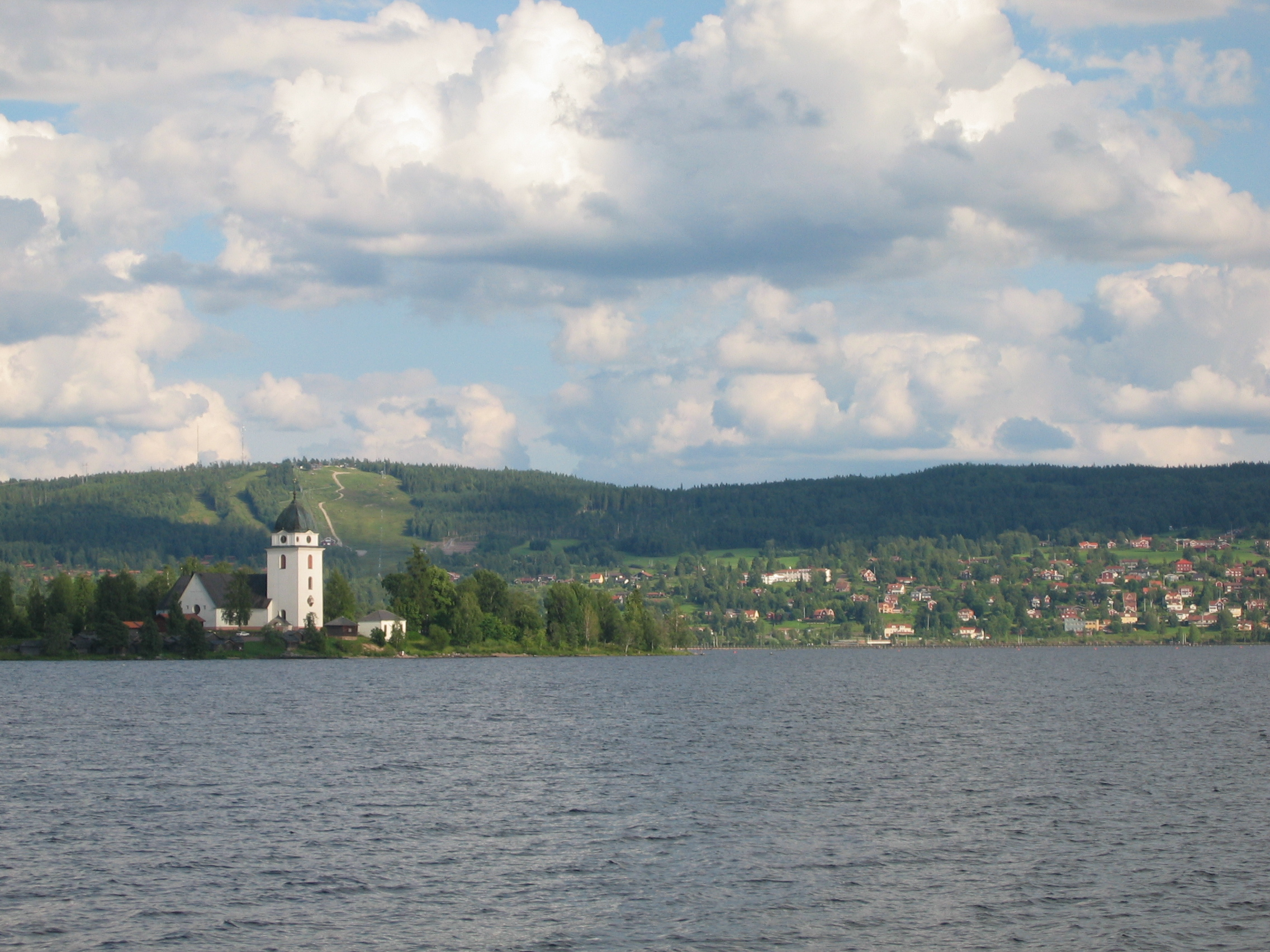
Rättvik Church by lake Siljan.

Siljan, in Dalarna in central Sweden, is Sweden's seventh largest lake. The cumulative area of Siljan and the adjacent, smaller lakes Orsasjön and Insjön is 354 km^{2} (137 sq mi). Siljan reaches a maximum depth of 134 m (440 ft), and its surface is situated 161 m (528 ft) above sea level. This renders the lowest point of the basin at 27 metres (89 ft) above sea level. The largest town on its shore is Mora.

== Impact crater ==
The lake is located around the southwestern perimeter of the Siljan Ring (Swedish: Siljansringen), a circular geological formation which was formed 377 million years ago in the Devonian by a major meteorite impact. The original crater, now mostly eroded, is estimated to have been about 52 km (32 mi) in diameter and is the largest known impact crater in Europe (excluding Russia). The Cambrian, Ordovician and Silurian sedimentary rocks deformed by the impact are rich in fossils.

Some people suspect that there might be oil in the area, but drilling has been unsuccessful so far. There are large deposits of lead and zinc in the Boda area.

== Deep drilling project ==
In the 1980s, state-owned power company Vattenfall drilled a deep well in search of natural gas. The project began as a deep commercial wildcat well, and its unusual location in fractured granite attracted scientific attention (e.g., as potentially significant in the context of theory of abiogenic petroleum origin).

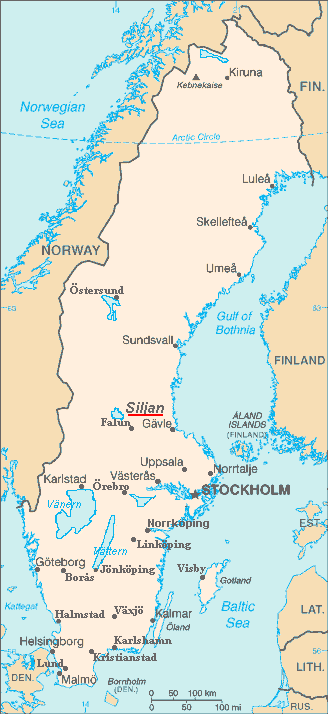
Map of Siljan in Sweden

The Gravberg-1 well location, in the north-northeast section of the ring, was chosen because a gravity anomaly indicates less dense rock below, and four seismic reflectors may represent cap rock above a natural gas reservoir. Electrical resistance is lower in the ring than outside it, suggesting the rocks contain fluid. Soil in the area showed clear traces of methane and heavy hydrocarbons, with a halo around the ring coincident with vanadium and nickel trace elements; the sediment was shown to not be the source of the hydrocarbons due to their location, ice movement pattern, and low level of maturity. Although the greatest gas leakage was in the north-northwestern corner, the lack of leakage in the central area suggested an underlying cap.

Drilling began on 1 July 1986. By September 1989 it reached 6,957 m (22,825 ft) in depth.

Four seismic reflectors were detected at 1,440 m (4,720 ft), 2,800 m (9,200 ft), 4,740 m (15,550 ft) and 7,400 m (24,300 ft). The first three were penetrated and found to be dolerite sills, but the fourth had been identified before drilling as having the best potential for gas production. The dolerite is believed to have existed as much as 1/2 billion years before the meteorite impact. The granite is extensively fractured, with calcite as the principal cement down to the 3,200 m (10,500 ft) depth, with lesser amounts to 5,000 m (16,000 ft).

Traces of methane were found at all depths, with higher levels in dolerite. Although they appear to be of abiogenic origin, only that near the dolerite sills points to a probable mantle origin. Hydrogen was found in most sections of the hole, correlated with helium. The helium isotopic pattern was consistent with a radiogenic, crustal origin.

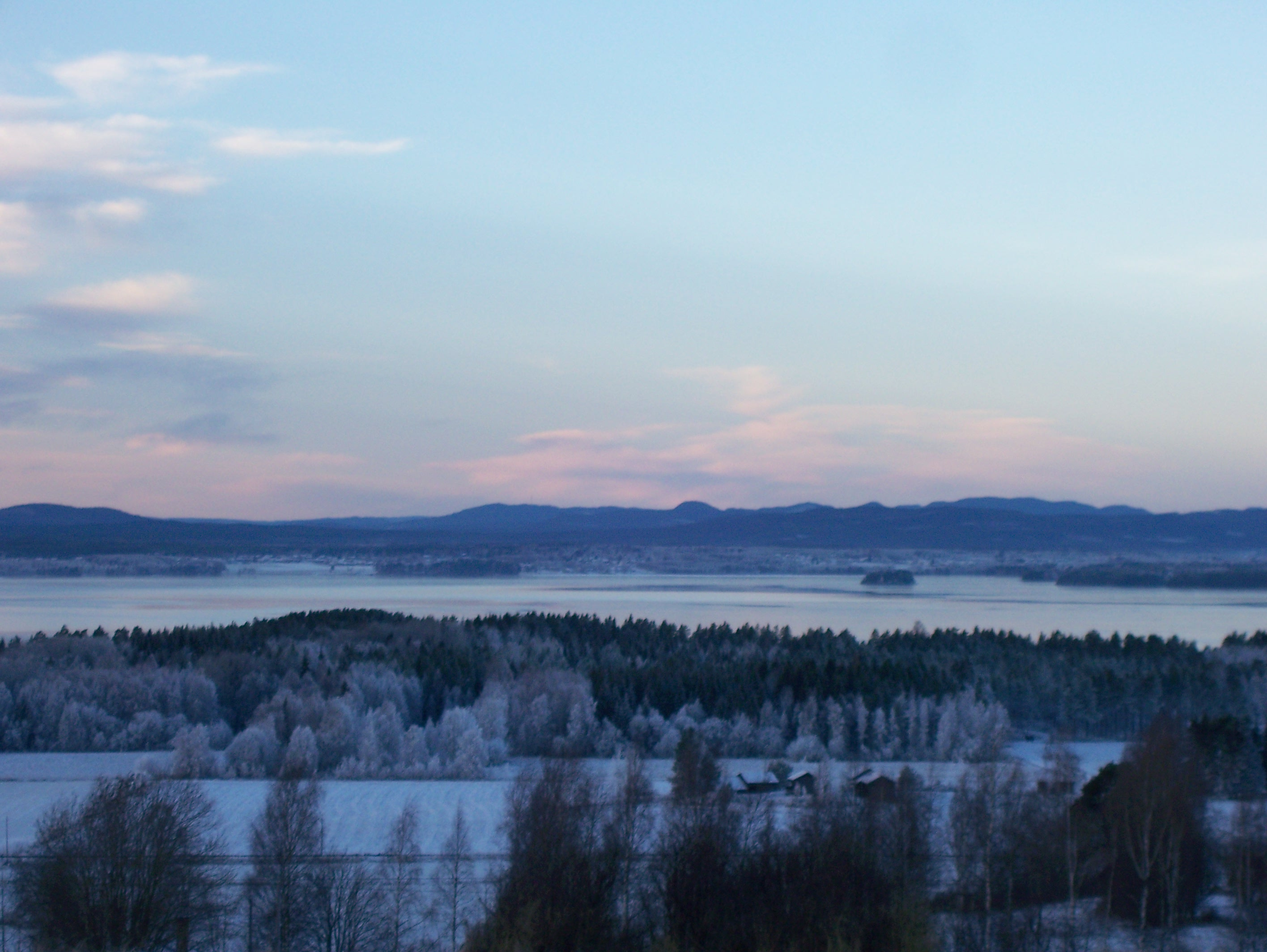
View over Siljan

A black sticky substance was found to be blocking the drill pipe when circulation was stopped for several days at a depth of 5,520 m (18,110 ft). The substance was black, sticky when wet, powdery when dry, showed no fluorescence, and was strongly magnetic. None of the drilling materials showed gas chromatographic patterns which corresponded with the black substance. It contained no ordinary rock minerals, none of the granite fines expected in the drilling fluid, but is made up of microscopic magnetite held together by oils.

The well did not penetrate the fourth seismic reflector, did not produce large quantities of fuel, and never entered commercial production. Only 84 barrels (13.4 m^{3}) of oil were produced; it was later shown to originate from organic additives, lubricants and mud used in the drilling process.

A second hole, Stenberg-1, was drilled in the center of the ring, 12 km (7.5 mi) distant from the ring sediments and from Gravberg-1. This well went to a depth of 6,500 m (21,300 ft). The hole produced gases and oily magnetite sludge similar to those found in Gravberg-1.

== Localities in the Siljan Ring ==
- Leksand
- Mora
- Orsa
- Rättvik
- Boda
