= Rättvik =

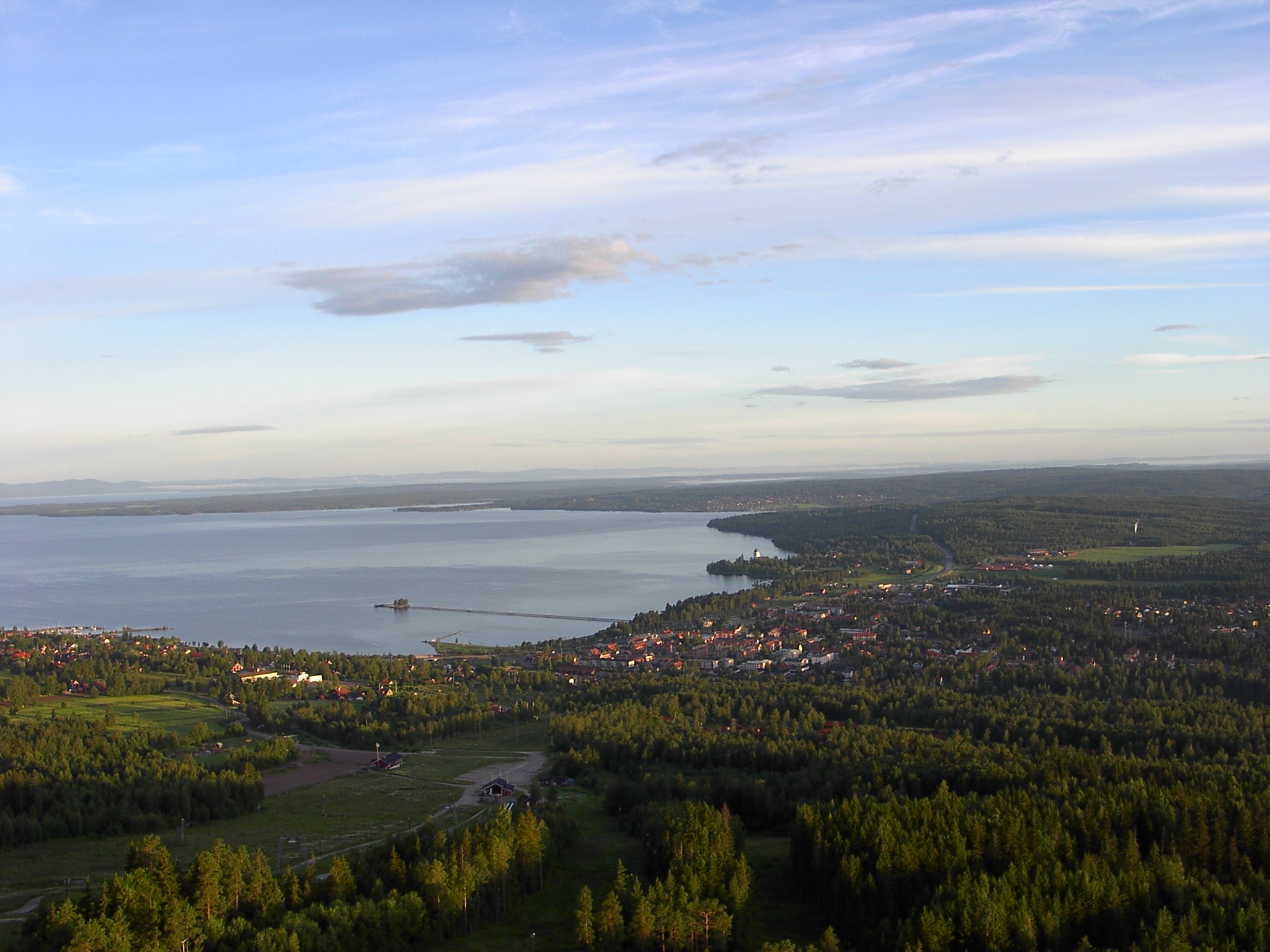
- Overview of Rättvik

- Location within Dalarna Location within Sweden
- Coordinates: 60°53′N 15°08′E
- Country: Sweden
- Province: Dalarna
- County: Dalarna County
- Municipality: Rättvik Municipality

Area
  - Total: 8.34 km^{2} (3.22 sq mi)

Population (31 December 2010)
  - Total: 4,686
  - Density: 562/km^{2} (1,460/sq mi)
- Time zone: UTC+1 (CET)
  - Summer (DST): UTC+2 (CEST)
- Climate: Dfc

Rättvik is a locality on the eastern shore of the lake Siljan and the seat of Rättvik Municipality, Dalarna County, Sweden, with 4,686 inhabitants in 2010. Its bandy club IFK Rättvik has reached the highest division Elitserien and has built an indoor arena. The local baseball team, Rättvik Butchers has won the Swedish cup once and the Swedish championship twice.

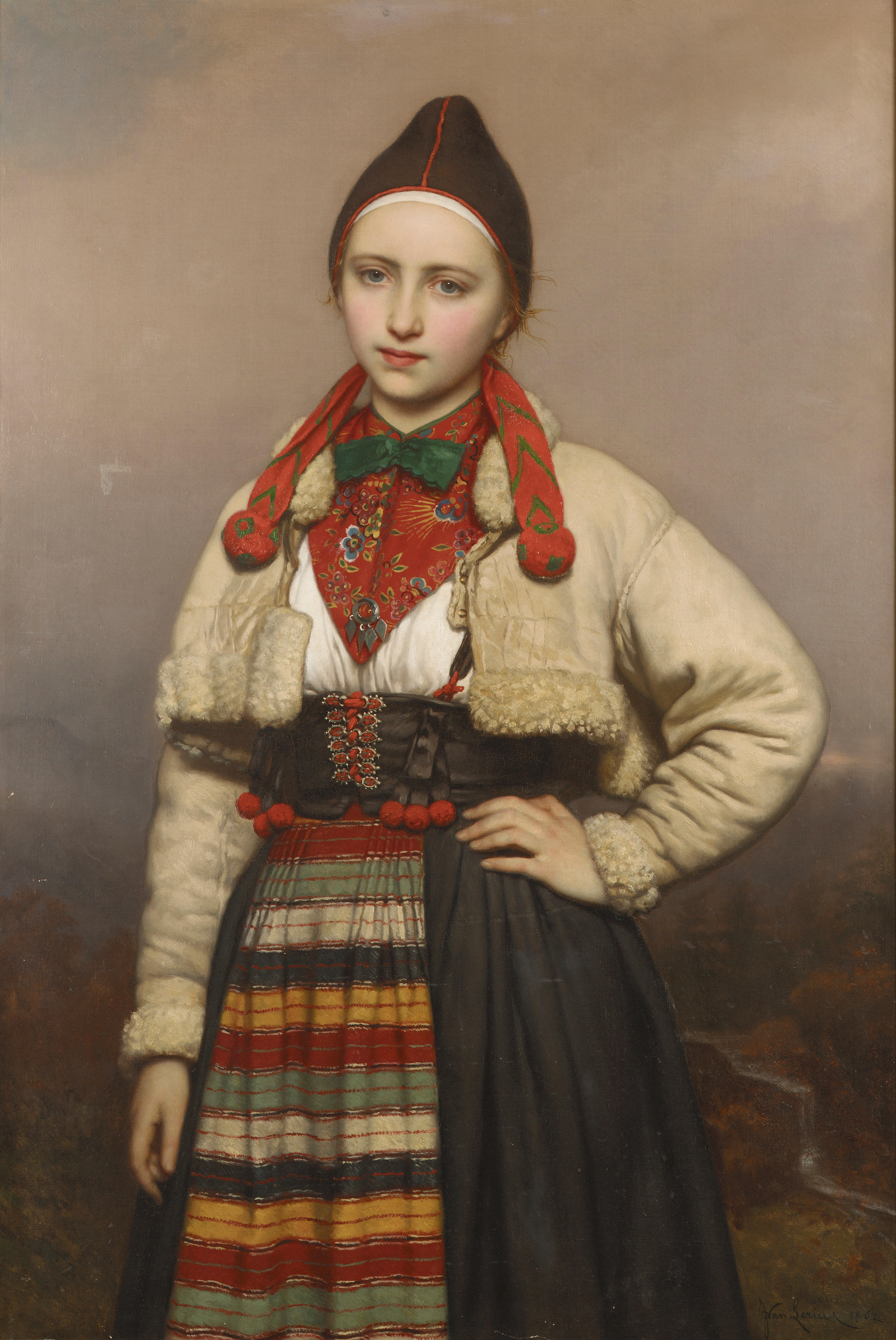
Girl in Rättvik folk costume, 1862, by Joseph van Lerius

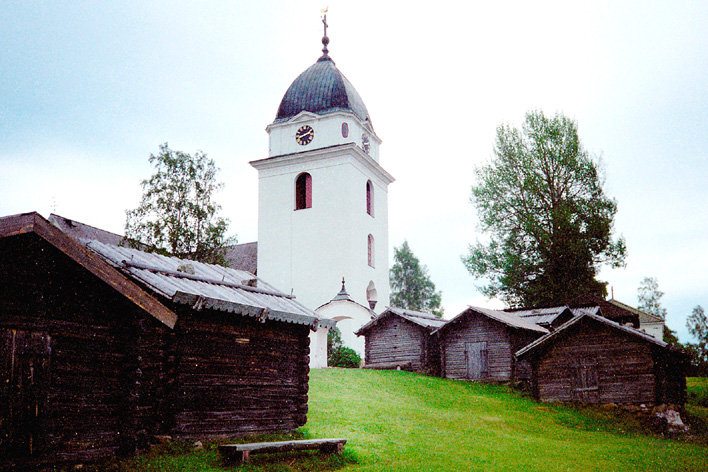
Rättvik Church

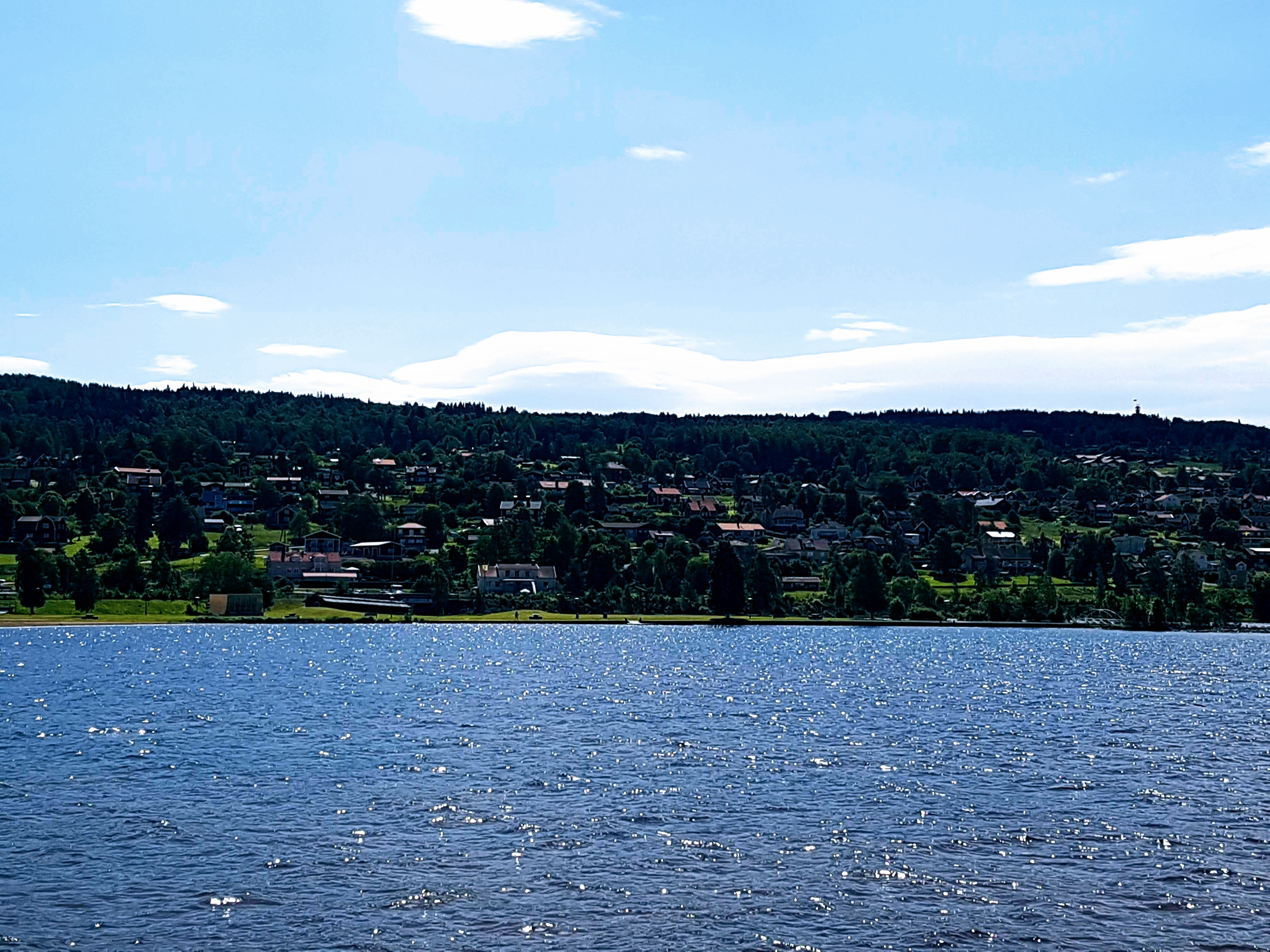
View of Rättvik across the lake

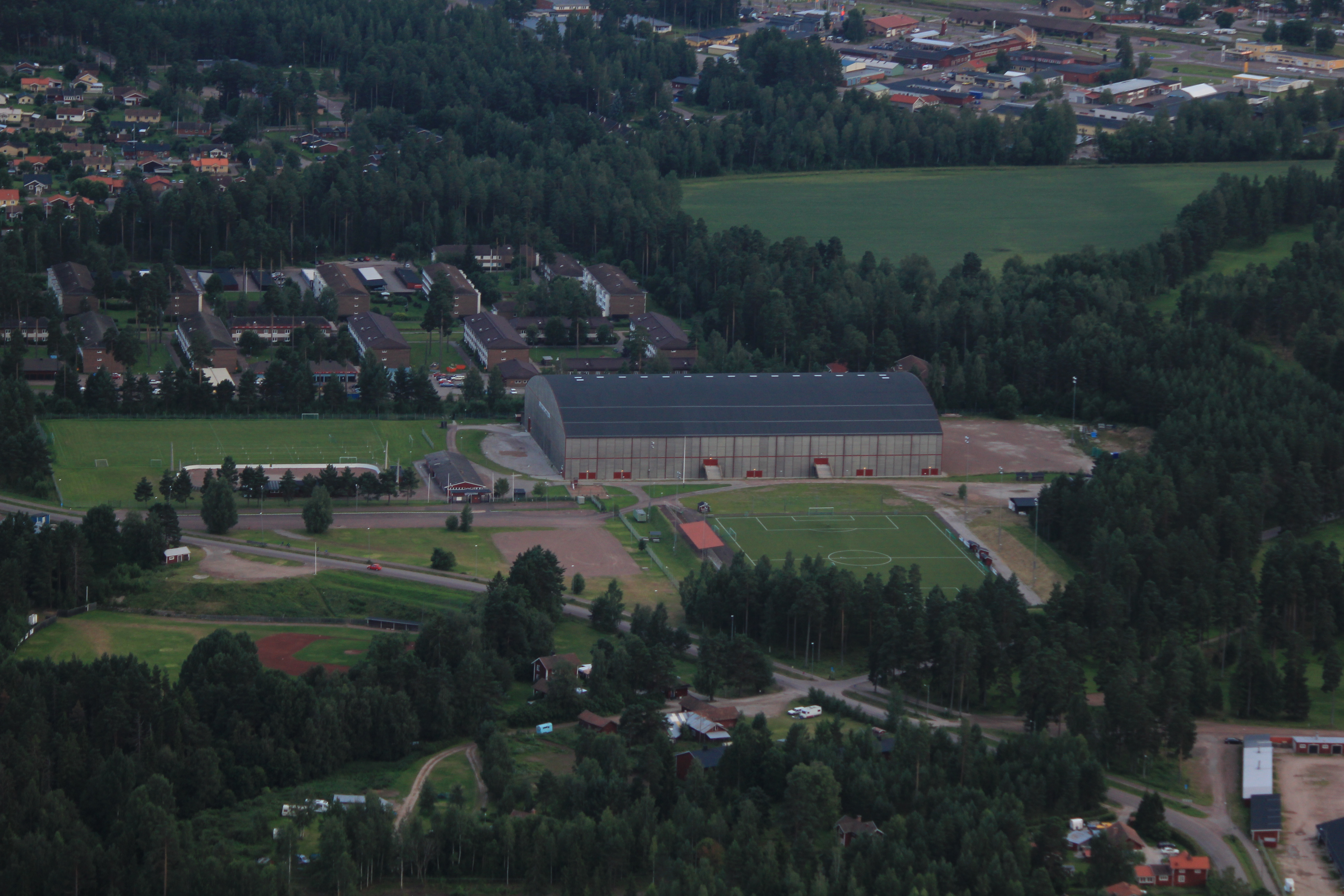
The bandy arena

== Sports ==
- Rättvik Arena
