= Orsa Lake =

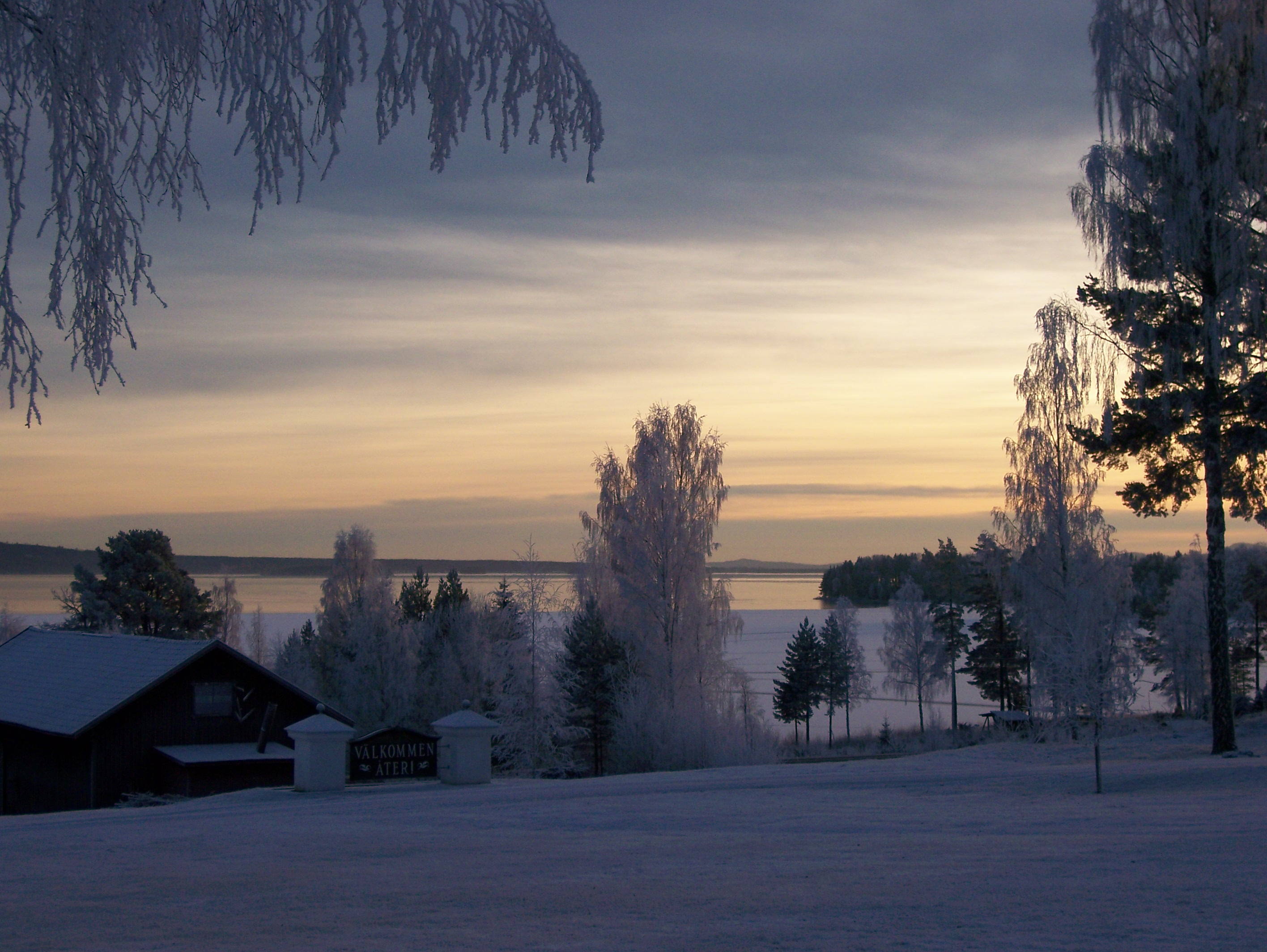
- Sunset over Orsasjön

- Location within Dalarna Location within Sweden
- Location: Dalarna, Sweden
- Coordinates: 61°05′17″N 14°32′49″E
- Type: Lake
- Max. length: 14 km (8.7 mi)
- Max. width: 6.5 km (4.0 mi)
- Surface area: 53 km^{2} (20 sq mi)
- Max. depth: 94 m (308 ft)

Orsa Lake (Swedish: Orsasjön) is a lake in the Swedish province Dalarna. It is connected to Siljan by a 4 kilometres (2.5 mi) narrow sound, Moranoret.

Orsa Lake is 14 kilometres (8.7 mi) long and 6.5 kilometres (4.0 mi) wide. The lake has an area of 53 square kilometres (20 sq mi) and the largest depth reaches to 94 meters.

The 340 kilometres (210 mi) hiking trail Siljansleden goes around the Orsa and Siljan lakes.

== Images ==
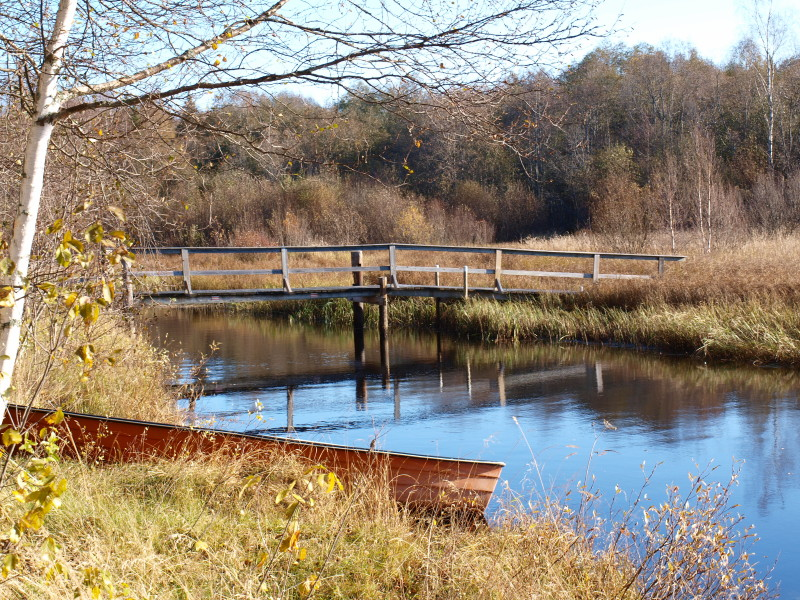
Where Enån meets the Orsasjön

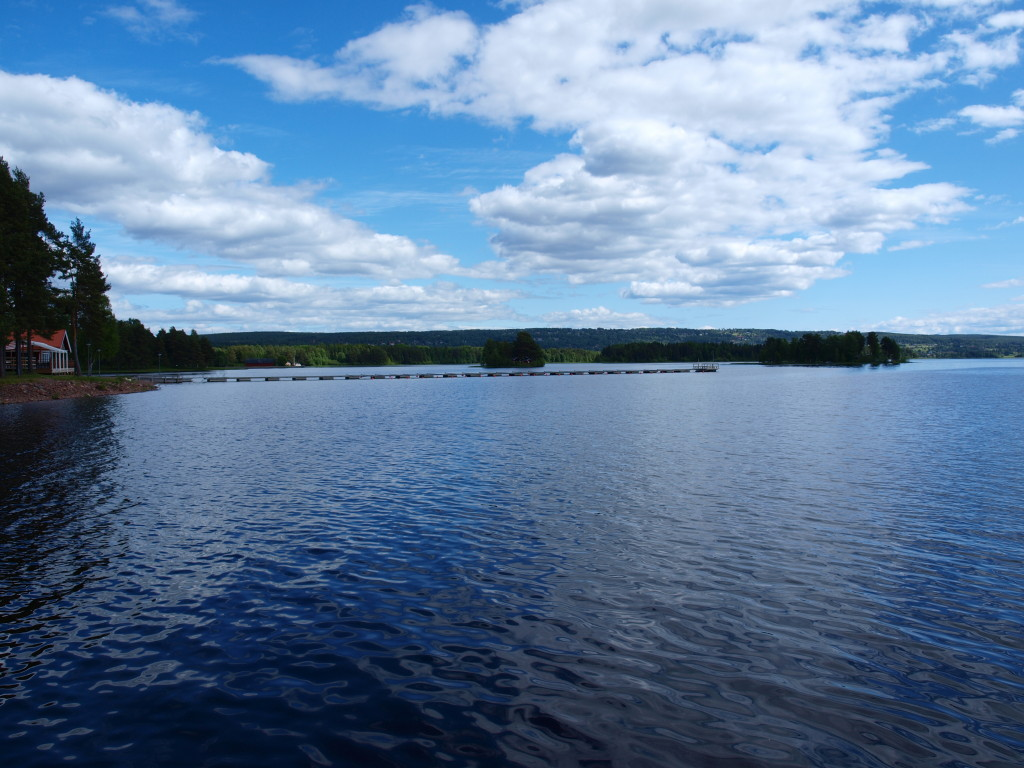
General view of the lake
