= Fet-Mats =

Swedish natural mummy

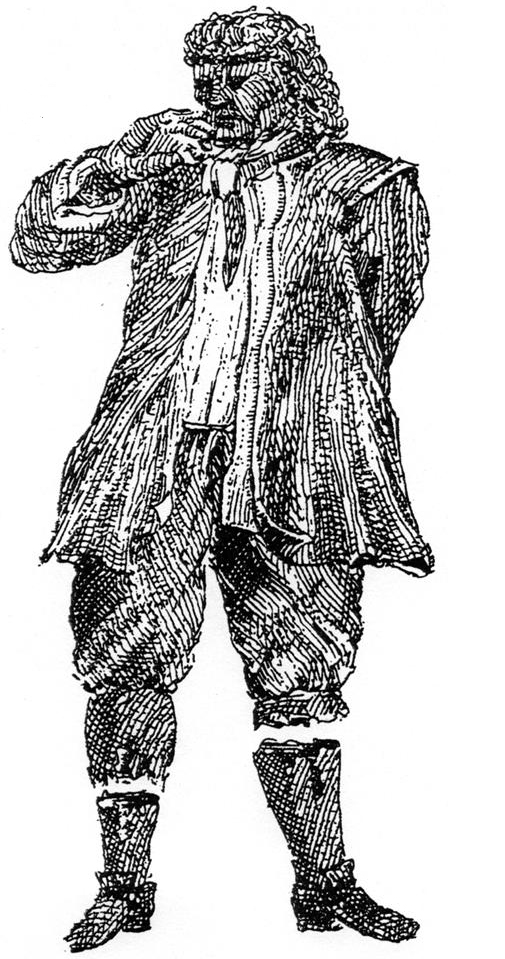
- Born: Mats Israelsson; 17th century Boda, Svärdsjö, Kopparberg County, Sweden
- Died: c. 1677; Falun Mine, near Falun, Kopparberg County, Sweden
- Body discovered: 2 December 1719
- Other names: Fat Mats
- Partner: Margaret Olsdotter

Fet-Mats or Fat Mats (born Mats Israelsson; died 1677) was a natural mummy found in Sweden in 1719.

In 1719, miners in the Falun Mine found an intact dead body in a water-filled, long-unused tunnel. When the body was put on display, it was identified by his former fiancée, Margaret Olsdotter, as Fet-Mats Israelsson, a native of Boda, Svärdsjö, Kopparberg County, who had disappeared 42 years earlier.

== Discovery ==
On 2 December 1719, miners discovered a dead man in the water-filled shaft known as Mårdskinnsfallet, in a part of the mine that had not been used for a long time. Both legs of the dead man were amputated and missing, but neither clothes, hands nor face showed signs of decay, which made it appear as if he had recently died; the find became a mystery because no person was reported as missing. When the body was raised to ground level, it began to dry and became "hard as wood" according to a contemporary description. According to others, the body had rather turned into stone, giving rise to the epithet "the petrified miner".

After the body was put on display in Stora Kopparberget, Margaret Olsdotter identified it as belonging to Fet-Mats Israelsson, her fiancé who disappeared in March 1677. Local oral historians say a second woman also claimed to be his fiancée, but this could have been motivated by the benefits paid to miner's widows.

When the naturalist Carl Linnaeus visited, he noticed that Fet-Mats was not petrified but just covered with vitriol, a substance now commonly known as the pesticide copper sulfate.

Linnaeus stated that as soon as the vitriol evaporated, the body would begin to decay. That proved to be correct.

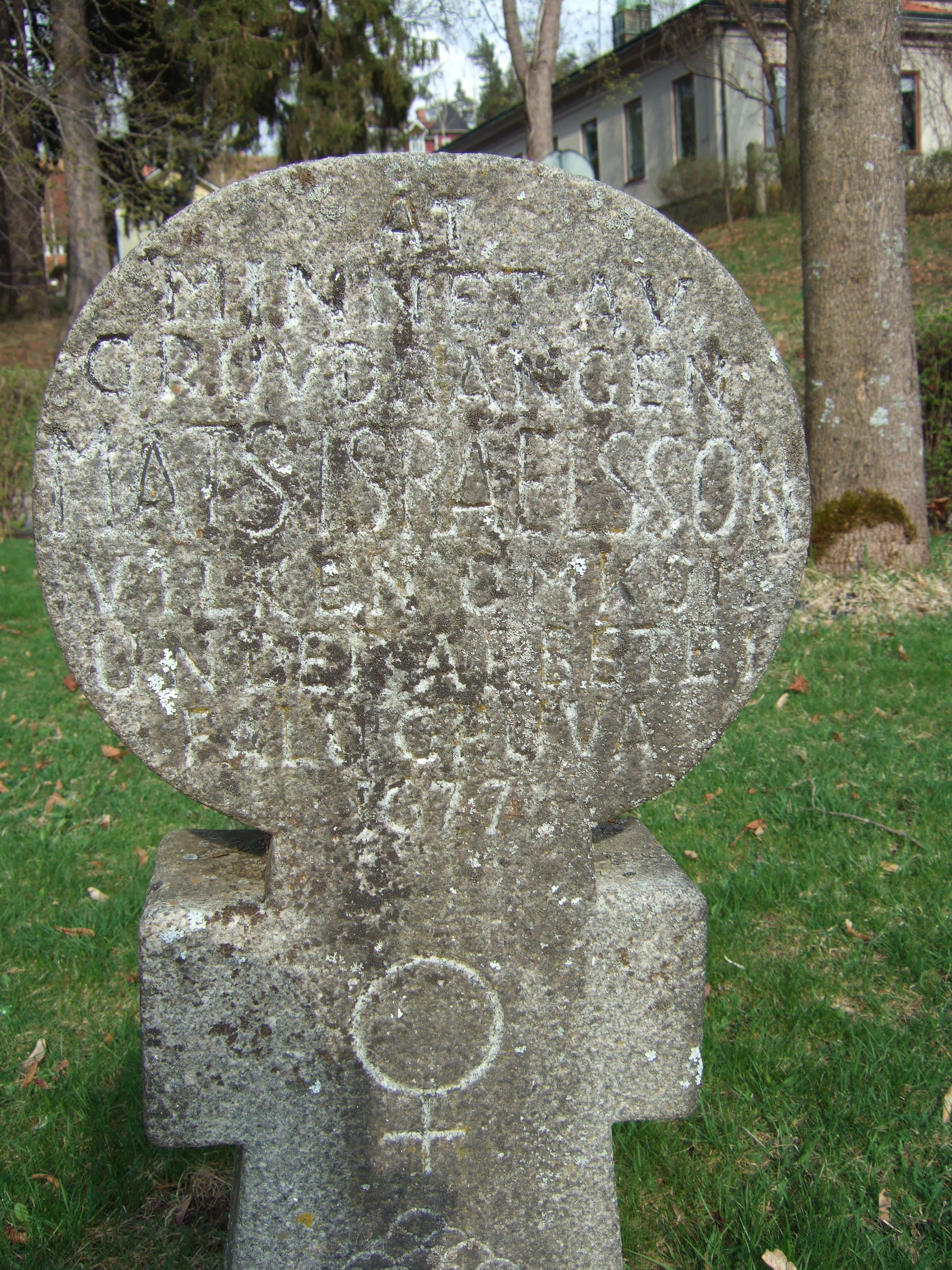
Fet-Mats gravestone in Falun, inscribed in Swedish as follows: "In memory of the miner Mats Israelsson who died while working at the Falun Mine in 1677"

However, Fet-Mats Israelsson's body remained on display for thirty years, until he was buried in Stora Kopparberg Church in Falun on 21 December 1749. During renovation of the floor in the early 1860s, the remains of Fet-Mats were found again and exhibited in a display case, until he was finally buried in 1930 in the church's graveyard.

== In culture ==
Fet-Mats became an inspiration for the German romanticists. The philosopher and naturalist Gotthilf Heinrich von Schubert wrote about him in Ansichten von der Nachtseite der Naturwissenschaft, Achim von Arnim wrote a ballad about Fet-Mats, Johann Peter Hebel wrote a short story about him called "Unverhofftes Wiedersehen" (lit. 'Unexpected Reunion'). Friedrich Rückert also wrote about Fet-Mats. Most notably E. T. A. Hoffmann wrote the short story "The Mines of Falun" published in his 1819 collection The Serapion Brethren. In 1842, Richard Wagner wrote a libretto based on Hoffmann's short story called "Die Bergwerke zu Falun", but it was refused and instead he wrote Tannhäuser. In 1901, Hugo von Hofmannsthal's Das Bergwerk zu Falun premiered at the Burgtheater in Vienna. In 2000 Julian Barnes wrote a short story called "The Story of Mats Israelson" later published in a collection of his short stories called "The Lemon Table".
