= Johan Gottlieb Gahn =

Swedish chemist (1745–1818)

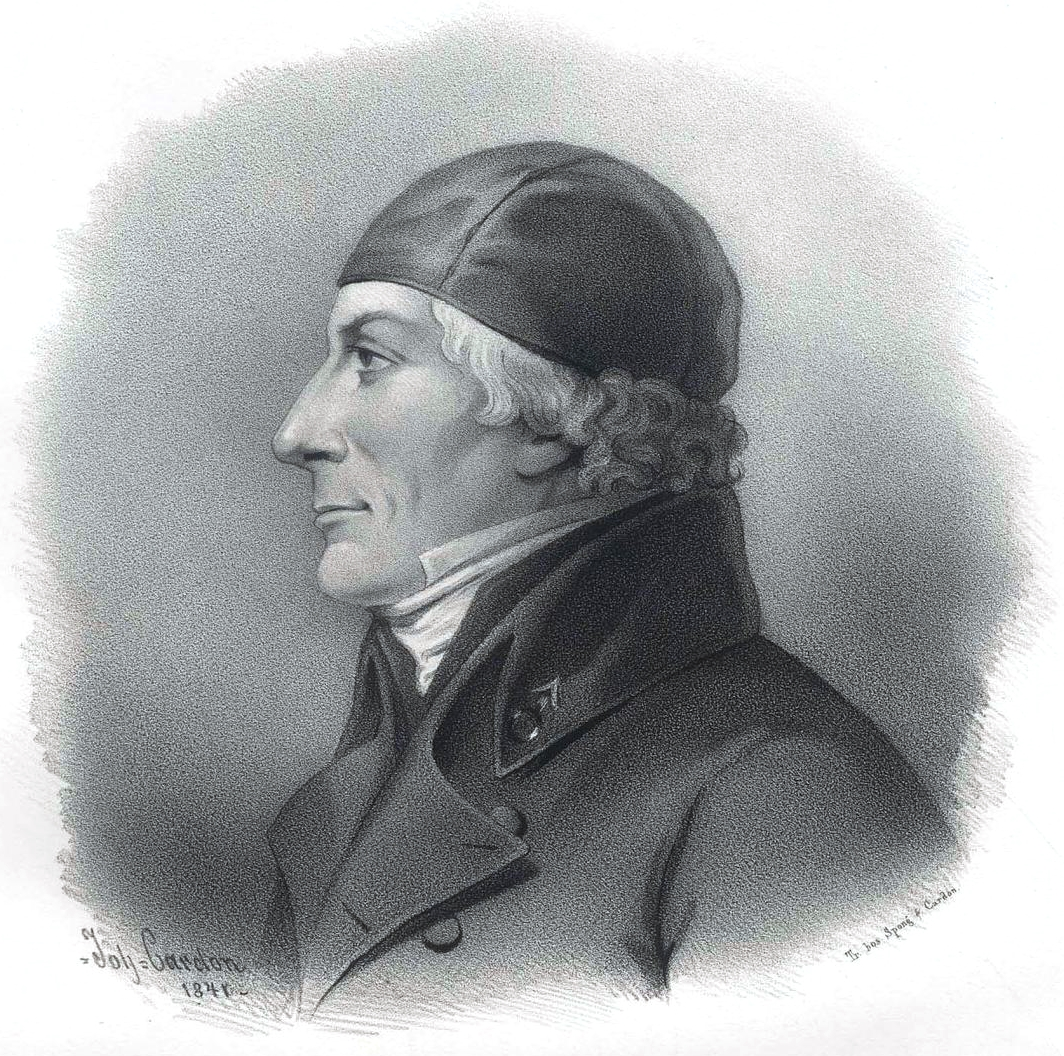
- Johan Gottlieb Gahn
- Born: 19 August 1745; Voxna bruk, Hälsingland, Sweden
- Died: 8 December 1818 (aged 73); Falun, Sweden
- Known for: Discovery of manganese
- Scientific career
- Fields: Chemistry

Johan Gottlieb Gahn (19 August 1745 – 8 December 1818) was a Swedish chemist and metallurgist who isolated manganese in 1774.

== Early life ==
Gahn studied in Uppsala from 1762 to 1770 and became acquainted with chemists Torbern Bergman and Carl Wilhelm Scheele. 1770 he settled in Falun, where he introduced improvements in copper smelting, and participated in building up several factories, including those for vitriol, sulfur and red paint.

== Career ==
From 1773 to 1817, Gahn served as the Board of Mines’ chemist; he received the title of bergmästare in 1782 and was appointed puisne member of the same board in 1784. In 1793, he became a member of the General Committee for State Affairs, which partly replaced the Privy Council of Sweden from 1789.

== Scholarship ==
He was very reluctant to publish his scientific findings himself, but freely communicated them to Torbern Bergman and Carl Wilhelm Scheele. One of Gahn's discoveries was that manganese dioxide could be reduced to manganese metal using carbon, becoming the first to isolate this element in its metal form.

== Honorifics ==
In 1784, Gahn was elected a member of the Royal Swedish Academy of Sciences, and in 1808 foreign member of the Bavarian Academy of Sciences and Humanities.

== See also ==
- Gahnite, named after Gahn
