= Bjursås =

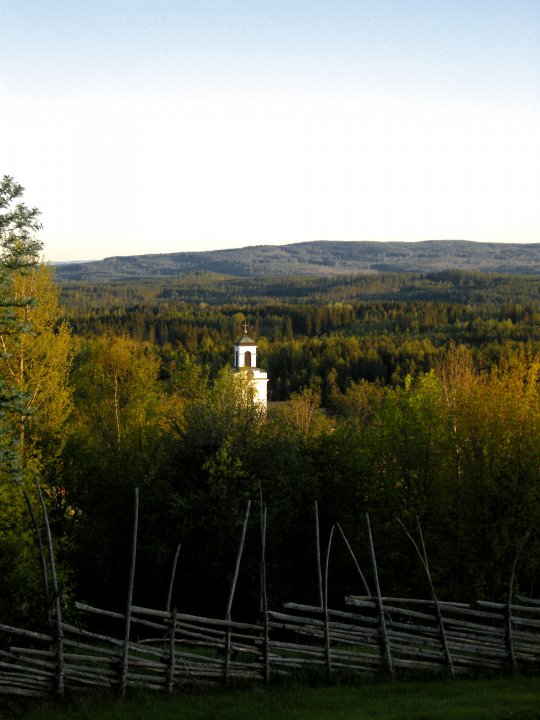
- Bjursås Church as from Dössberget in Bjursås

- Location within Dalarna Location within Sweden
- Coordinates: 60°44′N 15°26′E
- Country: Sweden
- Province: Dalarna
- County: Dalarna County
- Municipality: Falun Municipality

Area
  - Total: 3.25 km^{2} (1.25 sq mi)

Population (31 December 2010)
  - Total: 1,839
  - Density: 566/km^{2} (1,470/sq mi)
- Time zone: UTC+1 (CET)
  - Summer (DST): UTC+2 (CEST)
- Climate: Dfc

Bjursås (Swedish pronunciation: [ˈbjʉ̂ːʂɔs]) is a locality situated in Falun Municipality, Dalarna County, Sweden with 1,839 inhabitants in 2010.

Tourists, many of whom come from Stockholm, visit its ski resort every winter. A large part of the population commute to Falun or work within the local forest industry. Bjursås is nicknamed "The Switzerland of Dalarna", because of its broken ground. "Bjur" in the name is an old Norse word for beaver. A literal translation of the name to English means "Beaver Ridge".
