= Sågmyra =

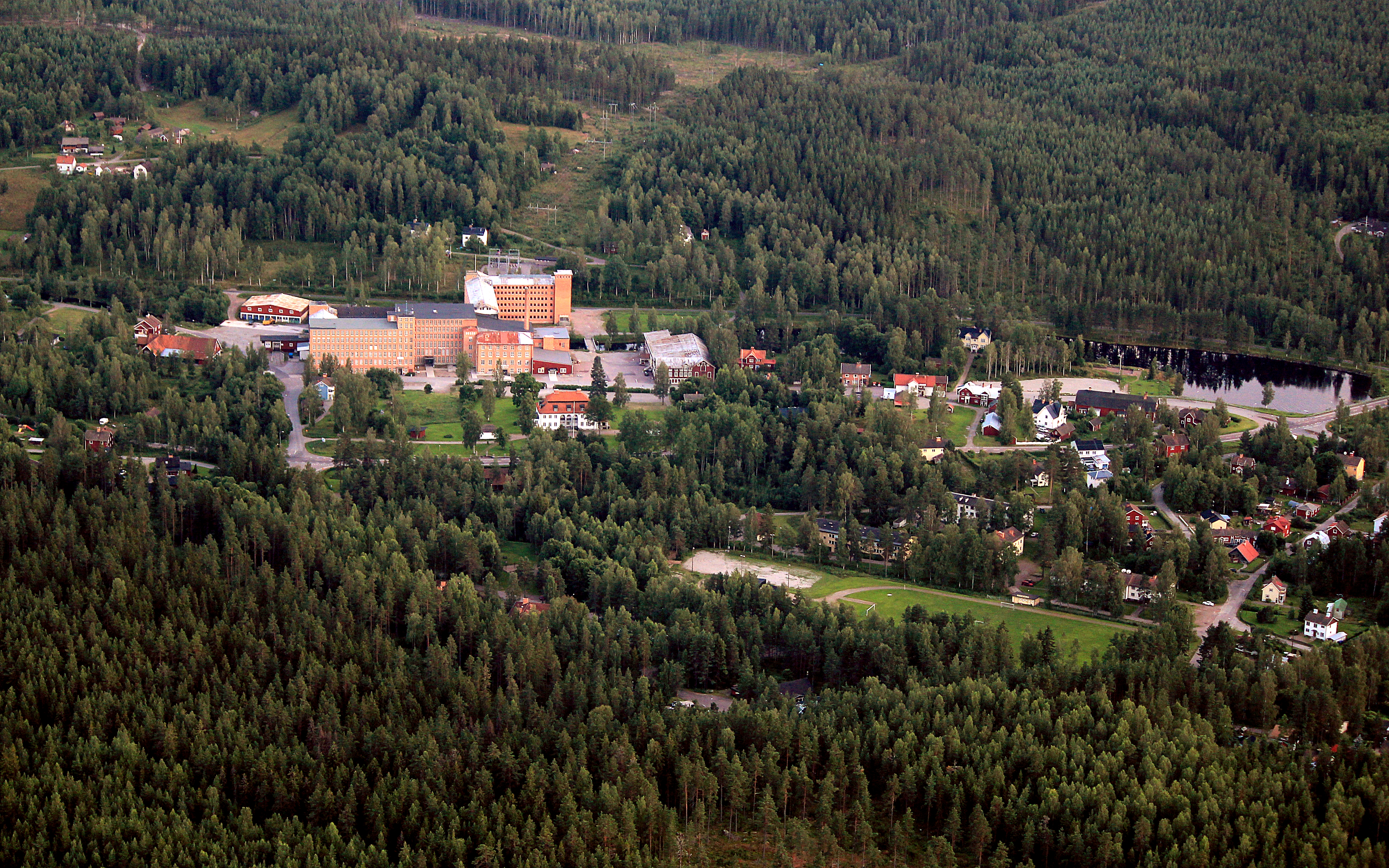
- Sågmyra in August 2012

- Location within Dalarna Location within Sweden
- Coordinates: 60°43′N 15°17′E
- Country: Sweden
- Province: Dalarna
- County: Dalarna County
- Municipality: Falun Municipality

Area
  - Total: 1.53 km^{2} (0.59 sq mi)

Population (31 December 2010)
  - Total: 546
  - Density: 356/km^{2} (920/sq mi)
- Time zone: UTC+1 (CET)
  - Summer (DST): UTC+2 (CEST)
- Climate: Dfc

Sågmyra is a locality situated in Falun Municipality, Dalarna County, Sweden, with 546 inhabitants in 2010.
