= Linghed =

- Location within Dalarna Location within Sweden
- Coordinates: 60°47′N 15°51′E
- Country: Sweden
- Province: Dalarna
- County: Dalarna County
- Municipality: Falun Municipality

Area
  - Total: 2.10 km^{2} (0.81 sq mi)

Population (31 December 2010)
  - Total: 618
  - Density: 295/km^{2} (760/sq mi)
- Time zone: UTC+1 (CET)
  - Summer (DST): UTC+2 (CEST)
- Climate: Dfc

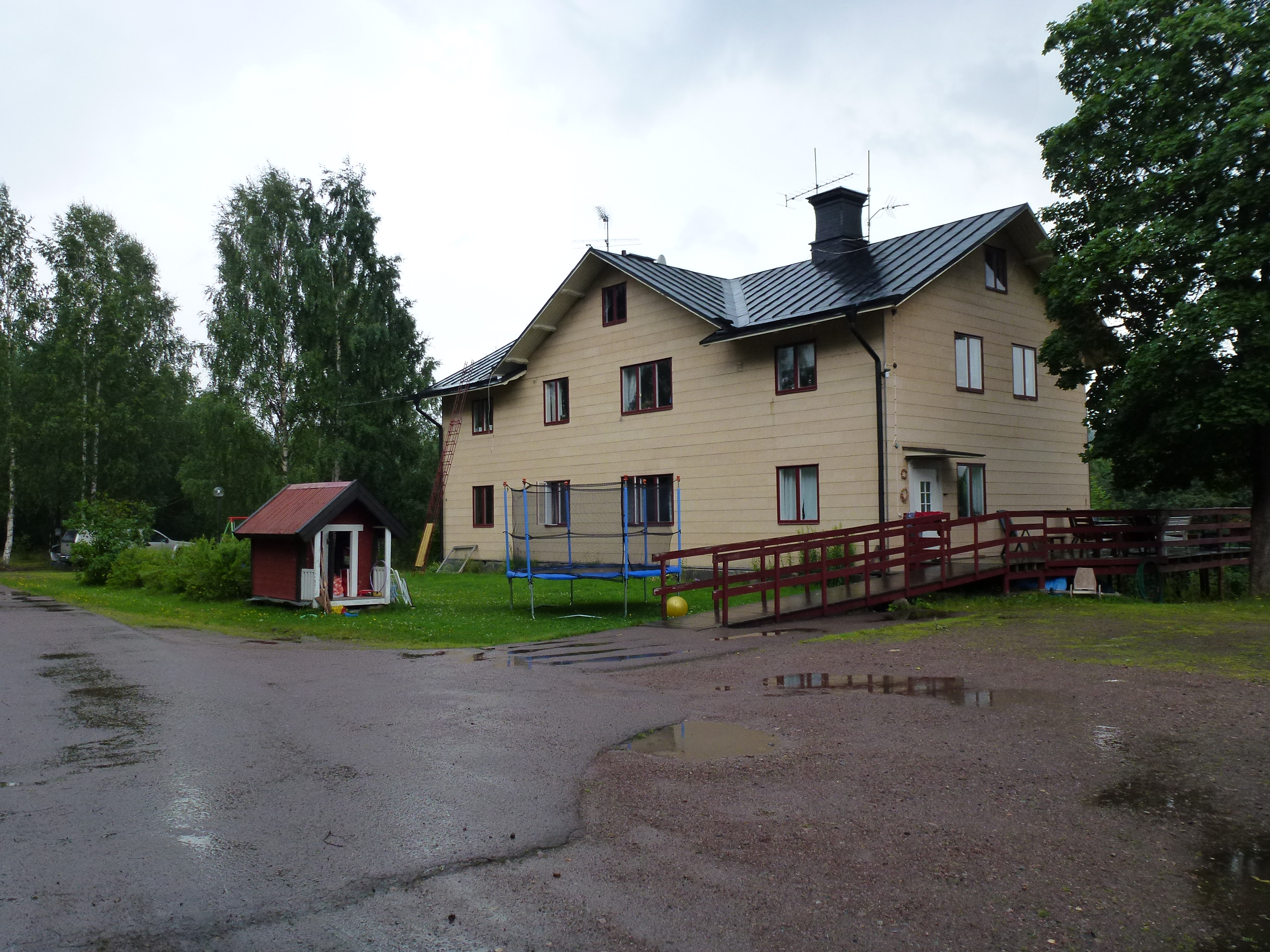
Former Linghed railway station

Linghed is a locality situated in Falun Municipality, Dalarna County, Sweden with 618 inhabitants in 2010.
