= Bengtsheden =

- Location within Dalarna Location within Sweden
- Coordinates: 60°42′N 15°52′E
- Country: Sweden
- Province: Dalarna
- County: Dalarna County
- Municipality: Falun Municipality

Area
  - Total: 1.50 km^{2} (0.58 sq mi)

Population (31 December 2010)
  - Total: 530
  - Density: 352/km^{2} (910/sq mi)
- Time zone: UTC+1 (CET)
  - Summer (DST): UTC+2 (CEST)
- Climate: Dfb

Bengtsheden is a locality situated in Falun Municipality, Dalarna County, Sweden with 530 inhabitants in 2010.
