= Danholn =

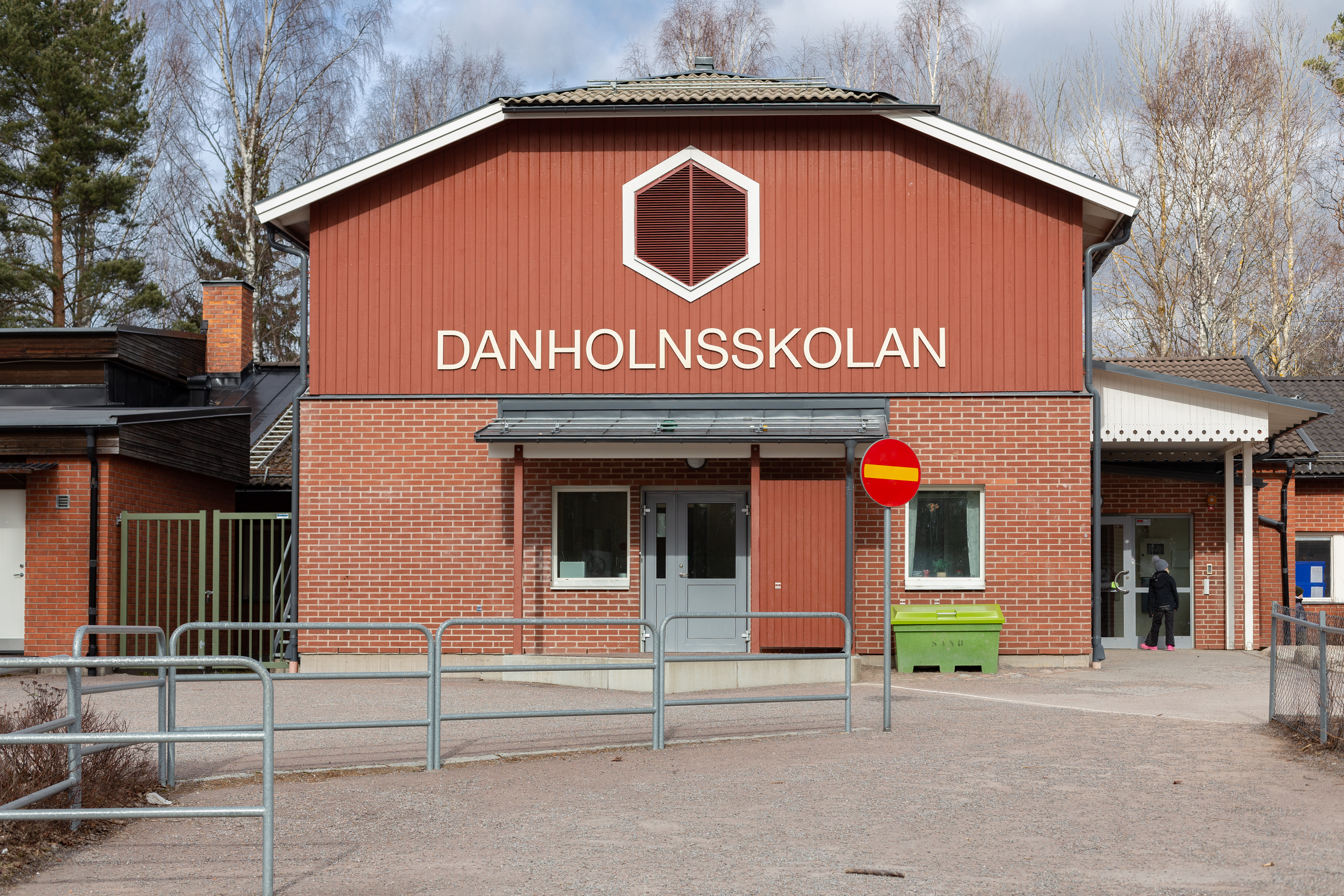
- A school building in Danholn

- Location within Dalarna Location within Sweden
- Coordinates: 60°37′N 15°47′E
- Country: Sweden
- Province: Dalarna
- County: Dalarna County
- Municipality: Falun Municipality

Area
  - Total: 0.77 km^{2} (0.30 sq mi)

Population (31 December 2010)
  - Total: 440
  - Density: 572/km^{2} (1,480/sq mi)
- Time zone: UTC+1 (CET)
  - Summer (DST): UTC+2 (CEST)
- Climate: Dfb

Danholn is a locality situated in Falun Municipality, Dalarna County, Sweden with 440 inhabitants in 2010.
