= Falun Municipality =

Falun Municipality Falu kommun
- Municipality
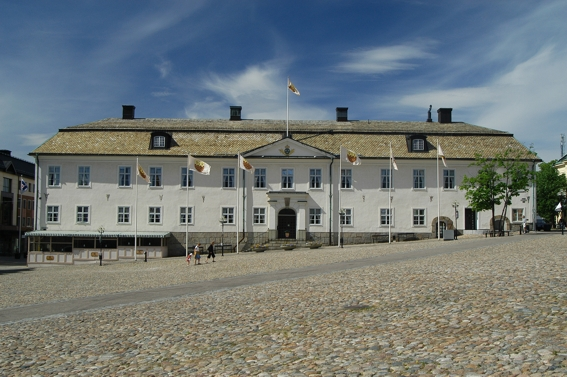
- Falun City Hall

- Flag Coat of arms

- Coordinates: 60°36′N 15°38′E
- Country: Sweden
- County: Dalarna County
- Seat: Falun

Area
  - Total: 2,275.17 km^{2} (878.45 sq mi)
  - Land: 2,040.13 km^{2} (787.70 sq mi)
  - Water: 235.04 km^{2} (90.75 sq mi)
- Area as of 1 January 2014.

Population (30 June 2025)
  - Total: 59,914
  - Density: 29.368/km^{2} (76.062/sq mi)
- Time zone: UTC+1 (CET)
  - Summer (DST): UTC+2 (CEST)
- ISO 3166 code: SE
- Province: Dalarna
- Municipal code: 2080
- Website: www.falun.se
- Density is calculated using land area only.

Falun Municipality (Swedish: Falu kommun) is a municipality in Dalarna County in central Sweden. Its seat is located in the city of Falun. Falun is the second biggest city and provincial capital of Dalarna County. Falun was originally famous for its copper mine.

The present municipality was formed at the time of the local government reform of 1971, when the City of Falun and six surrounding rural municipalities were amalgamated.

== Localities ==
- Aspeboda
- Bengtsheden
- Bjursås
- Danholn
- Grycksbo
- Falun (seat)
- Linghed
- Sundborn
- Svärdsjö
- Sågmyra
- Toftbyn
- Vika

== Demographics ==
This is a demographic table based on Falun Municipality's electoral districts in the 2022 Swedish general election sourced from SVT's election platform, in turn taken from SCB official statistics.

In total there were 59,762 residents, including 46,002 Swedish citizens of voting age. 51.8% voted for the left coalition and 46.7% for the right coalition.

Location	Residents	Citizen adults	Left vote	Right vote	Employed	Swedish parents	Foreign heritage	Income SEK	Degree
Location			%	%					
Aspeboda	1,504	1,138	45.4	53.3	90	93	7	29,773	45
Bjursås V	1,639	1,251	41.6	56.8	87	94	6	25,712	25
Bjursås Ö	2,032	1,604	47.8	51.0	83	91	9	24,691	35
Boda-Toftbyn	1,453	1,144	41.4	57.4	86	96	4	26,905	32
Bojsenburg	2,071	1,354	58.6	37.5	62	65	35	18,041	31
Borgärdet-Lumsheden	1,949	1,528	43.6	55.6	81	91	9	23,031	31
Britsarvet	1,270	1,104	60.4	38.5	83	90	10	25,453	68
Danholn-Karlsbyheden	1,400	1,079	50.1	49.3	85	93	7	25,936	38
Elsborg	1,654	1,172	62.6	35.8	78	68	32	22,560	44
Enviken	1,634	1,312	38.9	60.0	88	93	7	25,108	26
Gruvan	2,129	1,661	54.9	44.1	89	92	8	30,067	58
Gruvriset	2,232	1,468	49.6	49.0	88	90	10	29,376	56
Grycksbo	1,922	1,488	53.0	45.8	84	88	12	25,077	32
Haraldsbo	1,178	879	52.5	44.3	81	81	19	26,236	43
Herrhagen	1,738	1,329	57.1	38.8	67	66	34	19,082	29
Hosjö Näs	1,829	1,377	51.1	47.9	85	88	12	28,084	50
Hosjö Sandviken	1,415	1,114	47.2	51.3	86	87	13	27,558	44
Hyttgården	1,615	1,394	49.7	48.7	87	89	11	27,108	49
Hälsingberg	1,948	1,372	56.4	42.0	78	79	21	25,418	49
Hälsinggården	1,215	949	53.9	45.1	89	86	14	28,730	55
Karlberg	1,416	1,043	57.6	40.3	68	85	15	22,444	57
Kristine	1,076	1,063	51.6	46.8	83	88	12	27,776	52
Kvarnberget-Ö Främby	2,065	1,585	58.1	40.5	79	80	20	24,833	44
Kyrkbacken	1,450	1,172	58.1	40.1	88	91	9	30,861	73
Källviken-V Främby	1,608	1,189	49.3	49.9	84	88	12	29,334	49
Kämparvet	1,399	1,242	55.0	43.0	72	83	17	23,106	52
Linghed	906	681	33.4	64.8	82	94	6	24,906	30
Lugnet	1,444	1,136	57.1	41.6	87	90	10	31,068	73
Nedre Norslund	1,597	1,120	58.6	38.3	71	61	39	19,807	34
Pilbo-Samuelsdal	1,525	1,114	51.7	47.1	89	92	8	31,448	53
Slätta	1,194	827	61.9	37.5	89	88	12	30,111	57
Stenslund	1,632	1,182	56.3	42.9	93	91	9	33,764	70
Sundbornsbyn	1,481	1,146	47.1	52.1	87	93	7	27,608	47
Varpan	1,468	1,165	48.6	50.2	88	94	6	31,972	55
Vika	1,821	1,413	42.8	56.3	86	93	7	28,185	42
Ångbryggeriet	1,179	1,013	52.2	46.5	83	90	10	26,453	49
Östanfors	1,142	946	58.2	40.8	86	90	10	29,254	60
Övre Norslund	1,532	1,248	60.5	38.0	84	85	15	26,319	56
Source: SVT

== Riksdag elections ==
Year	%	Votes	V	S	MP	C	L	KD	M	SD	NyD	Left	Right
1973	89.2	30,135	3.8	40.1		32.1	9.3	1.6	12.7			43.9	54.1
1976	90.8	32,507	3.8	38.0		30.8	11.7	1.1	14.2			41.8	56.7
1979	89.1	33,105	4.9	38.7		24.4	10.3	1.2	20.0			43.6	54.7
1982	90.2	34,386	4.5	41.9	2.3	19.3	6.1	1.7	24.1			46.4	49.5
1985	88.4	34,444	4.4	40.8	1.7	14.9	15.9		22.1			45.2	52.8
1988	83.7	32,920	5.2	39.4	6.1	13.3	14.3	3.3	18.1			50.8	45.7
1991	84.6	33,704	3.8	34.2	3.9	10.3	9.9	7.4	21.9		6.7	37.9	49.6
1994	85.5	34,446	6.0	41.5	7.0	9.6	8.5	4.2	21.5		0.9	54.4	43.8
1998	81.1	32,490	12.4	33.2	5.8	5.3	4.6	12.6	22.2			51.4	44.8
2002	79.2	32,593	8.6	38.4	5.6	8.4	12.5	7.5	15.3	1.1		52.6	43.7
2006	82.2	34,442	5.9	33.8	6.1	10.5	6.3	5.9	25.5	2.5		45.8	48.2
2010	85.4	36,559	5.5	31.5	8.1	8.1	5.7	5.0	28.9	5.5		45.1	47.6
2014	87.4	38,251	5.9	30.2	7.2	8.0	4.5	3.8	23.2	12.8		43.3	39.5
2018	88.8	39,461	8.2	28.0	4.9	11.8	4.6	6.0	19.7	15.3		52.9	45.6

== Local politics ==
The Falu Party is a party with local interests.

== Sister cities ==
The following places have sister cities agreements with Falun:

- Hamina, Finland
- Grudziądz, Poland
- Gütersloh, Germany
- Vordingborg, Denmark

Falun also has two cooperation towns without formal sistering treaty:

- Kimberley, South Africa
- Pskov, Russia
