= Vincent Skoglund =

Swedish photographer (born 1974)

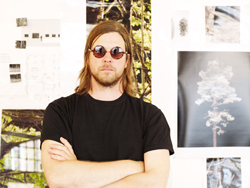
- Born: January 5, 1974 (age 52); Falun, Dalarna, Sweden
- Known for: Photography, entrepreneurship.
- Notable work: Lightyears (2004); Reduction (2006); Untitled Composition (2009); Tree (2009); Waste Management Series (2009 ongoing); Blackout (2010)
- Website: www.vincentskoglund.com

Vincent Skoglund (born 1974 in Falun, Sweden) is a Swedish photographer and entrepreneur who lives and works in Stockholm, Sweden.
