= Yttrium(III) phosphate =

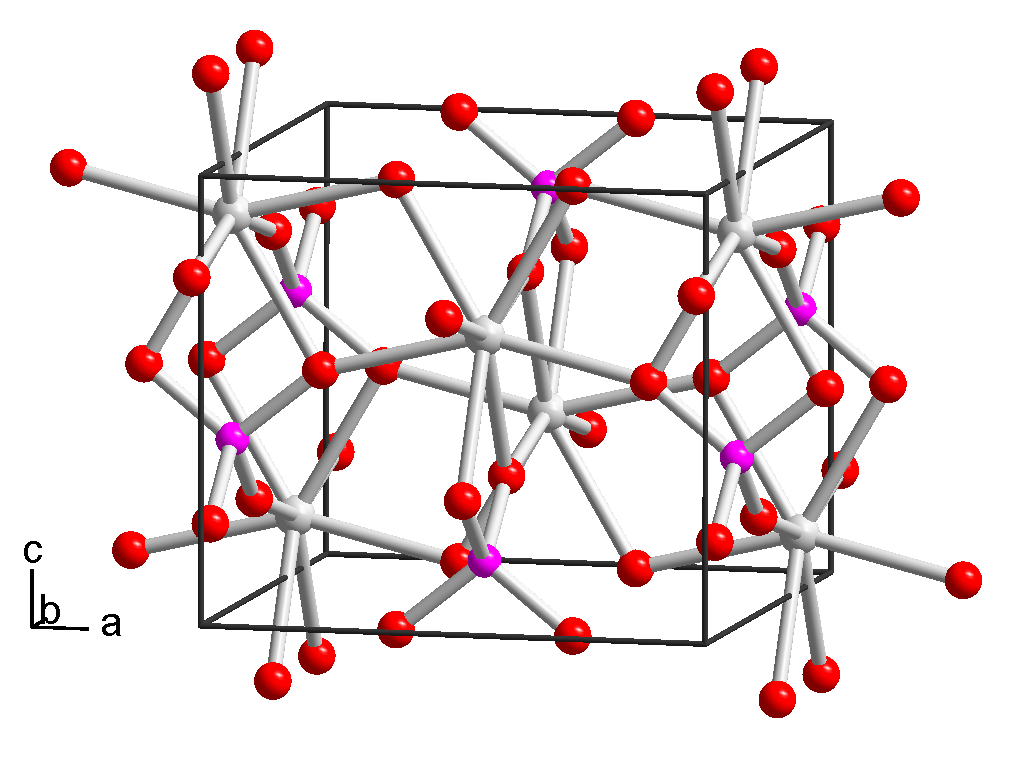

Names
- IUPAC name Yttrium phosphate

Identifiers
CAS Number	13990-54-0
3D model (JSmol)	Interactive image
ChemSpider	8488871
ECHA InfoCard	100.034.341
EC Number	237-790-3
PubChem CID	10313406
CompTox Dashboard (EPA)	DTXSID80884522
- InChI: InChI=1S/H3O4P.Y/c1-5(2,3)4;/h(H3,1,2,3,4);/q;+3/p-3 Key: UXBZSSBXGPYSIL-UHFFFAOYSA-K; InChI=1/H3O4P.Y/c1-5(2,3)4;/h(H3,1,2,3,4);/q;+3/p-3 Key: UXBZSSBXGPYSIL-DFZHHIFOAS
- SMILES: [O-]P(=O)([O-])[O-].[Y+3]

Properties
Chemical formula	YPO_{4}
Molar mass	183.877 g/mol

Hazards
- GHS labelling
Pictograms	(GHS07: Exclamation mark)
Signal word	Warning
Hazard statements	H315, H319, H335
Precautionary statements	P261, P264, P264+P265, P271, P280, P302+P352, P305+P351+P338, P319, P321, P332+P317, P337+P317, P362+P364, P403+P233, P405, P501
- Except where otherwise noted, data are given for materials in their standard state (at 25 °C [77 °F], 100 kPa). Infobox references

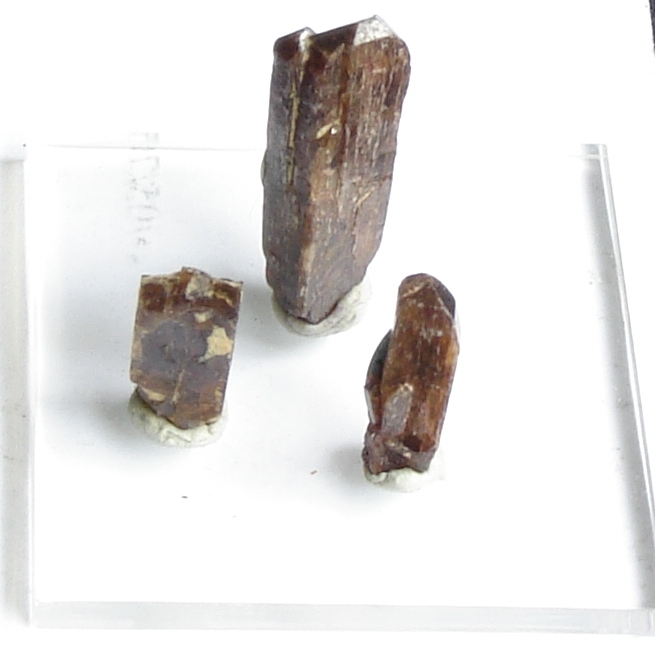
A sample of the mineral xenotime (YPO_{4})

Yttrium phosphate, YPO_{4}, is the phosphate salt of yttrium. It occurs in nature as minerals xenotime and weinschenkite.

== Preparation ==
Yttrium phosphate can be obtained by reacting yttrium chloride and sodium phosphate, or by reacting yttrium nitrate and diammonium hydrogen phosphate in solution:

YCl_{3} + (NH_{4})_{3}PO_{4} → YPO_{4} ↓ + 3 NH_{4}Cl
Y(NO_{3})_{3} + (NH_{4})_{2}HPO_{4} → YPO_{4} ↓ + 2 NH_{4}NO_{3} + HNO_{3}

Yttrium phosphate can also be prepared by the reaction of yttrium(III) oxide and diammonium hydrogen phosphate:

Y_{2}O_{3} + 2 (NH_{4})_{2}HPO_{4} → YPO_{4} + 2 NH_{3} + 3 H_{2}O

Yttrium chloride and phosphoric acid are mixed at 35~40°C, and then ammonia solution is added dropwise to react:

YCl_{3} + H_{3}PO_{4} + 3NH_{3}•H_{2}O ^{35-40°C}_{→} YPO_{4} + 3NH_{4}Cl + 3H_{2}O

== Properties ==
Yttrium phosphate belongs to the tetragonal crystal system, and the unit cell parameters are a=0.68832 nm, c=0.60208 nm. It can exist as a monohydrate, dihydrate or the anhydrous form. The dihydrate belongs to the monoclinic crystal system, the space group is B 2/b, and the unit cell parameters are a=0.648 nm, b=1.512 nm, c=0.628 nm, β=129.4°, Z=4.

Yttrium phosphate reacts with concentrated alkali to form yttrium hydroxide.

== Uses ==
Yttrium phosphate is used as a catalyst and is a potential containment material for nuclear waste. Ce^{3+}-doped yttrium phosphate shows luminescence in the UV range and can be used for tanning lamps. Double-doped materials such as Ce^{3+}-Tb^{3+} have also been reported.
