= Falun red =

Traditional pigment produced in Sweden

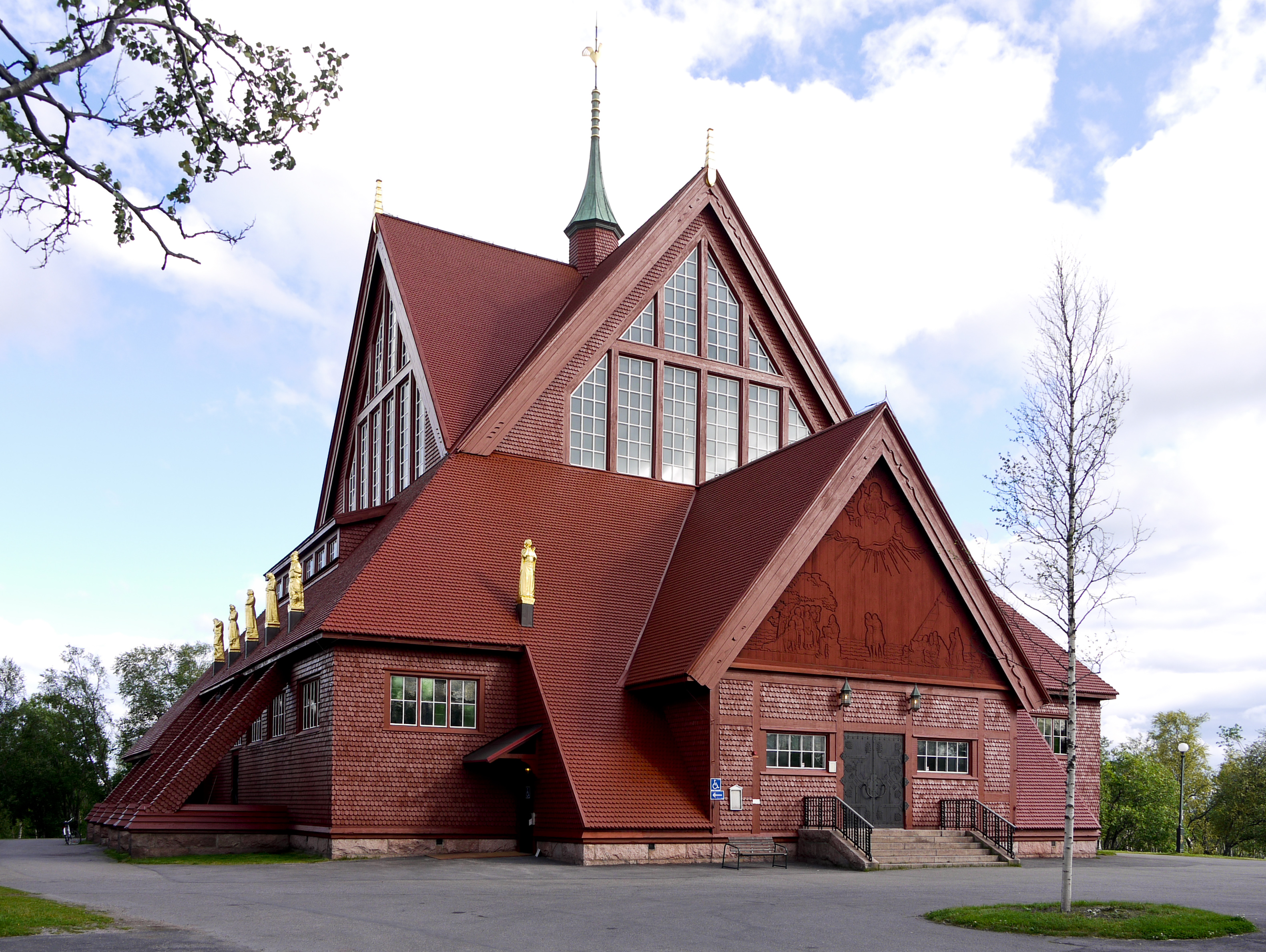
- Kiruna Church in Kiruna, Sweden

Color coordinates
- Hex triplet: #801818
- sRGB^{B} (r, g, b): (128, 24, 24)
- HSV (h, s, v): (0°, 81%, 50%)
- CIELCh_{uv} (L, C, h): (28, 75, 12°)
- Source: ColorHexa
- B: Normalized to [0–255] (byte)

Falun red or Falu red (/ˈfɑːluː/ FAH-loo; Swedish: falu rödfärg, pronounced [ˈfɑ̂ːlɵ ˈrø̂ː(d)færj]) is a red iron oxide pigment obtained as a byproduct of the Falun copper mine. It is traditionally used as a pigment in flour-based paint applied to exterior wood surfaces in Sweden, Finland, and Norway.

Falu Rödfärg is a protected trademark, which may only be used for products containing red pigment sourced from the Falun Mine. Rödfärg (Swedish), rödmylla (Finland Swedish) or punamulta (Finnish) can refer to any flour paint containing either natural red ochre or industrial iron oxide pigments.

== History ==
After centuries of copper mining in Falun, large piles of residual materials were deposited above ground near the mines.

By the 16th century, mineralization of the mine's tailings and slag, added by smelters, began to produce a red-coloured sludge rich in copper, limonite, silicic acid, and zinc. When this sludge was heated for several hours and mixed with linseed oil and rye flour, it was found to create an excellent anti-weathering paint. In the 17th century, Falun red began to be applied to wooden buildings to mimic the red-brick façades commonly used by the upper classes.

In Sweden's urban areas, wooden buildings were often painted with Falun red until the early 19th century, when authorities started opposing its use.

=== Resurgence ===
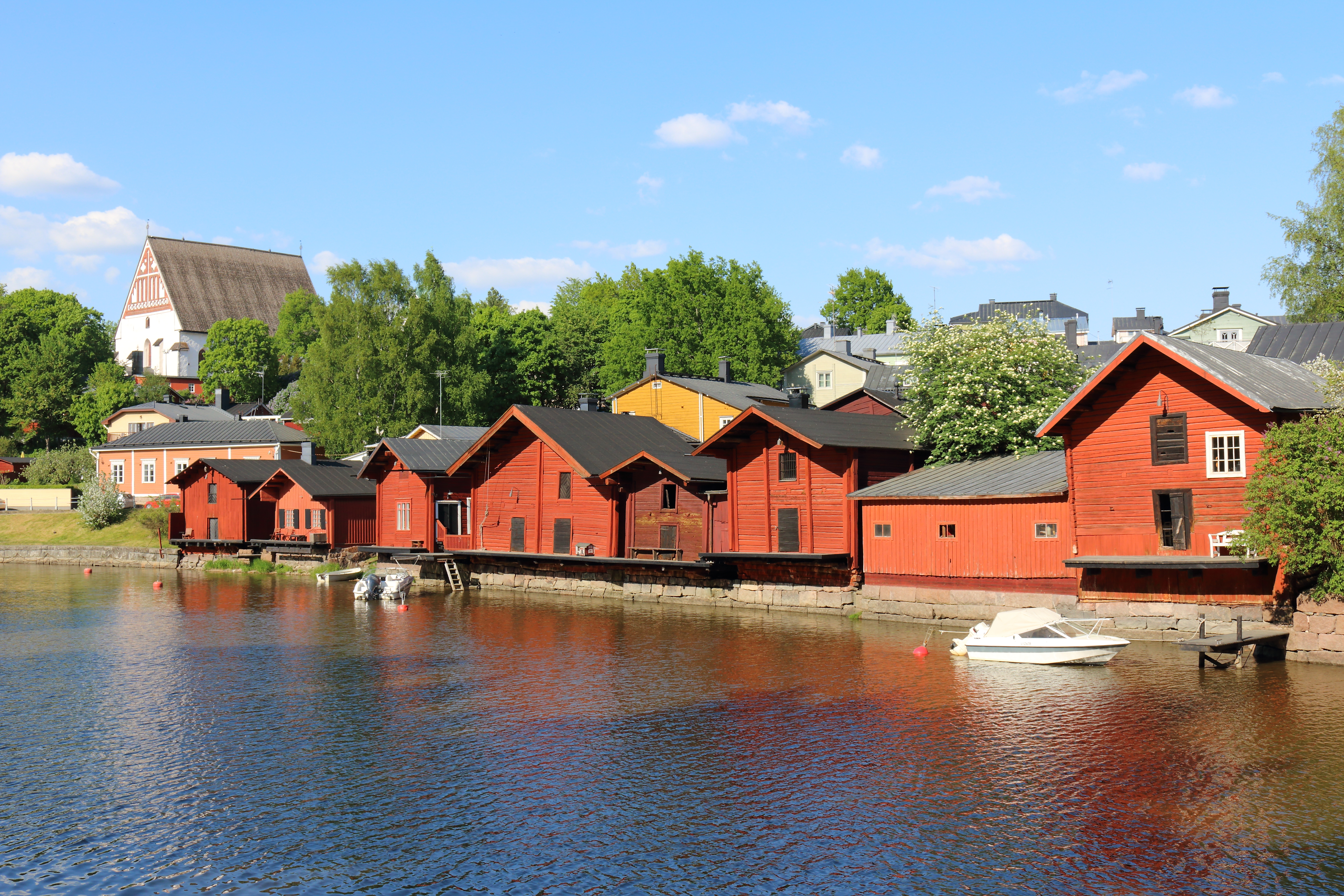
Riverside warehouses in Porvoo Old Town, Finland

Falun red saw a resurgence in popularity in the Swedish countryside during the 19th century, when poorer farmers and crofters began to paint their houses. Falun red is still widely used in the countryside. The Finnish expression "punainen tupa ja perunamaa" ('a red cottage and a potato patch'), referring to idyllic home and life, is a direct allusion to a country house painted in Falun red.

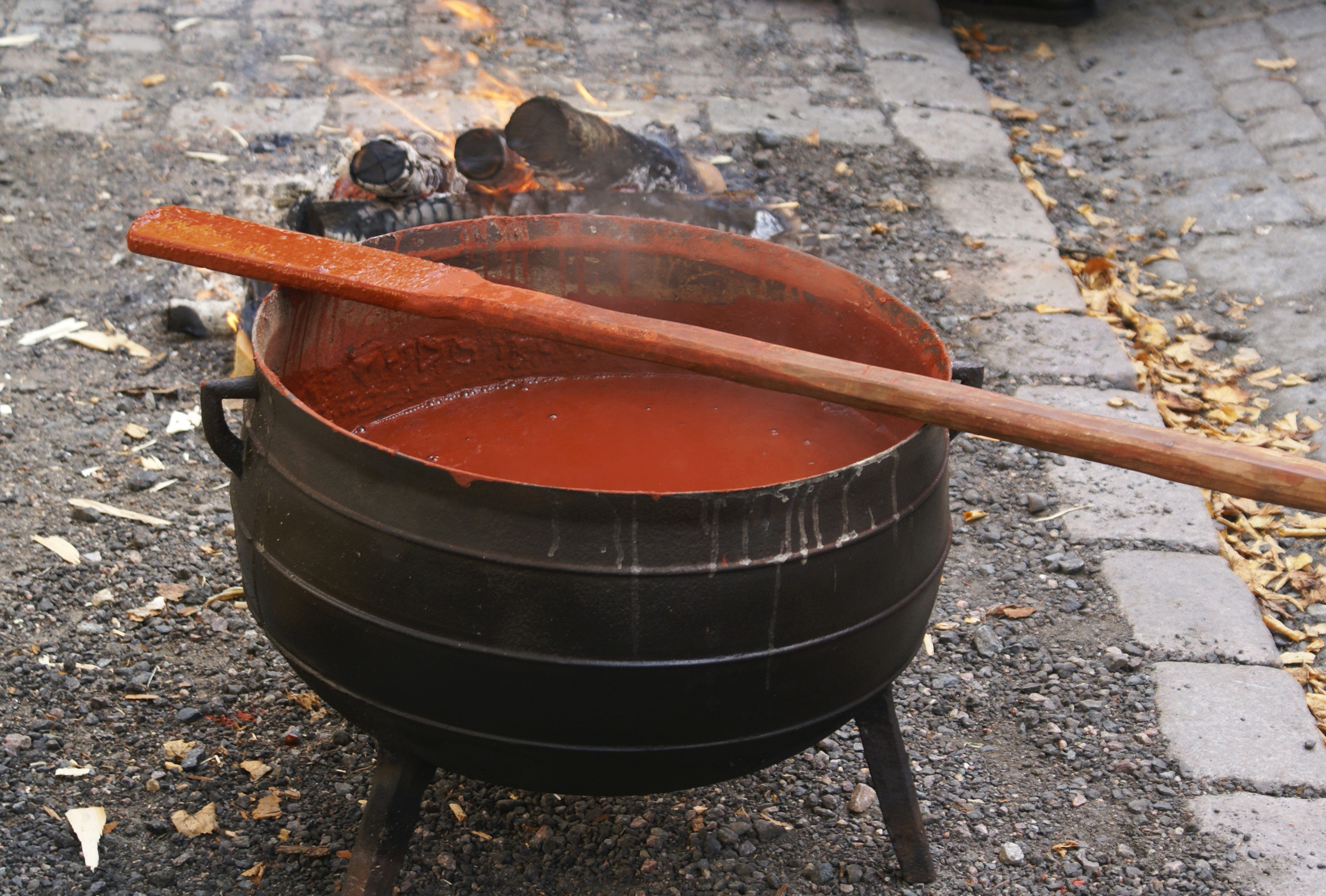
Falun red after being mixed and cooked to a paint

== Composition of flour paint ==
The paint consists of water, rye flour, linseed oil, silicates, iron oxides, copper compounds, and zinc. As Falun red ages the binder deteriorates, leaving the color granules loose, but restoration is easy since simply brushing the surface is sufficient before repainting.

The actual color may be different depending on the degree to which the oxide is burnt, ranging from almost black to a bright, light red. Different tones of red have been popular at different times.
