= Svärdsjö =

- Location within Dalarna Location within Sweden
- Coordinates: 60°45′N 15°55′E
- Country: Sweden
- Province: Dalarna
- County: Dalarna County
- Municipality: Falun Municipality

Area
  - Total: 1.35 km^{2} (0.52 sq mi)

Population (31 December 2010)
  - Total: 1,251
  - Density: 925/km^{2} (2,400/sq mi)
- Time zone: UTC+1 (CET)
  - Summer (DST): UTC+2 (CEST)
- Climate: Dfb

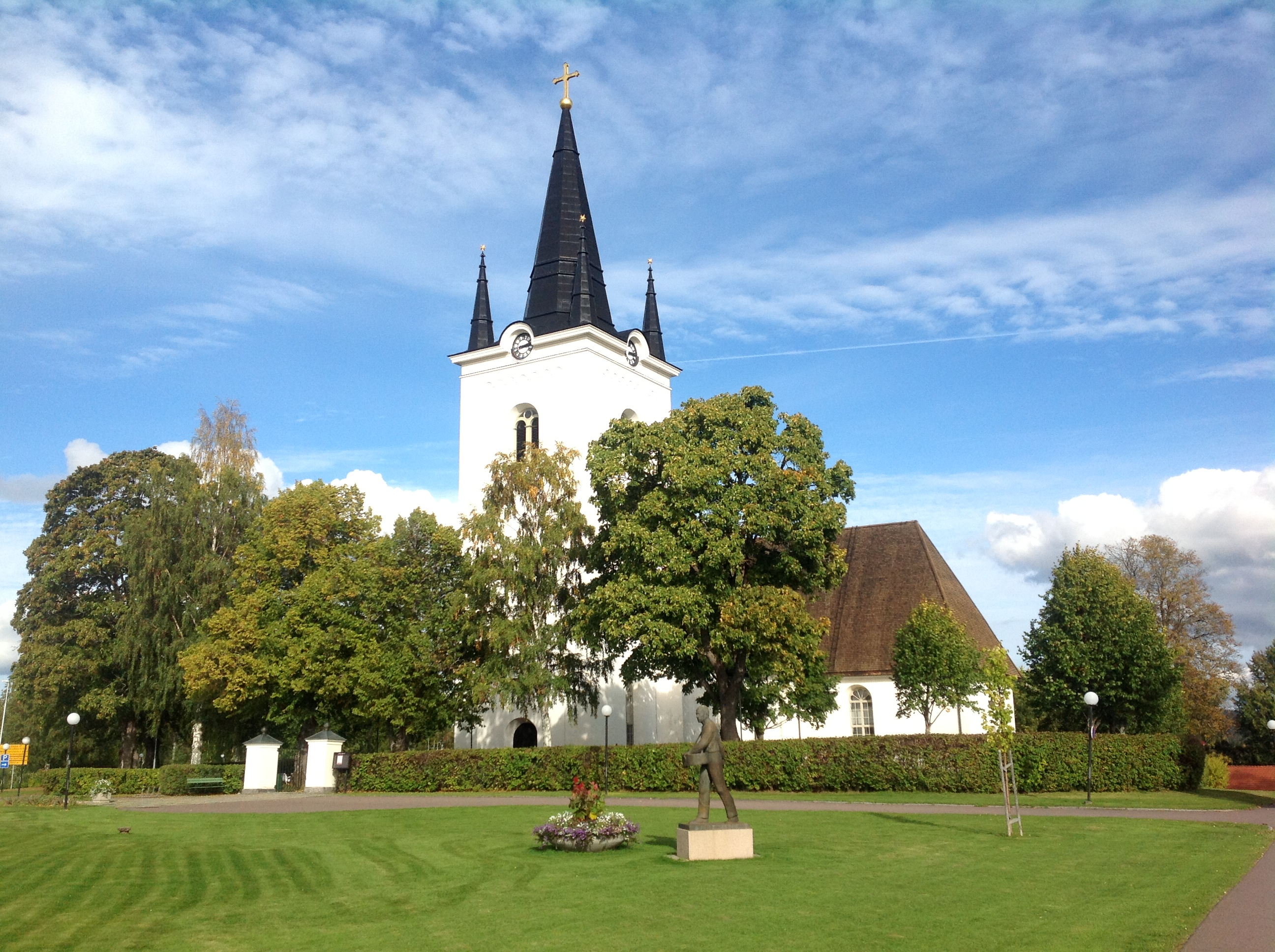

Svärdsjö is a locality situated in Falun Municipality, Dalarna County, Sweden with 1,251 inhabitants in 2010.
