= Falun =

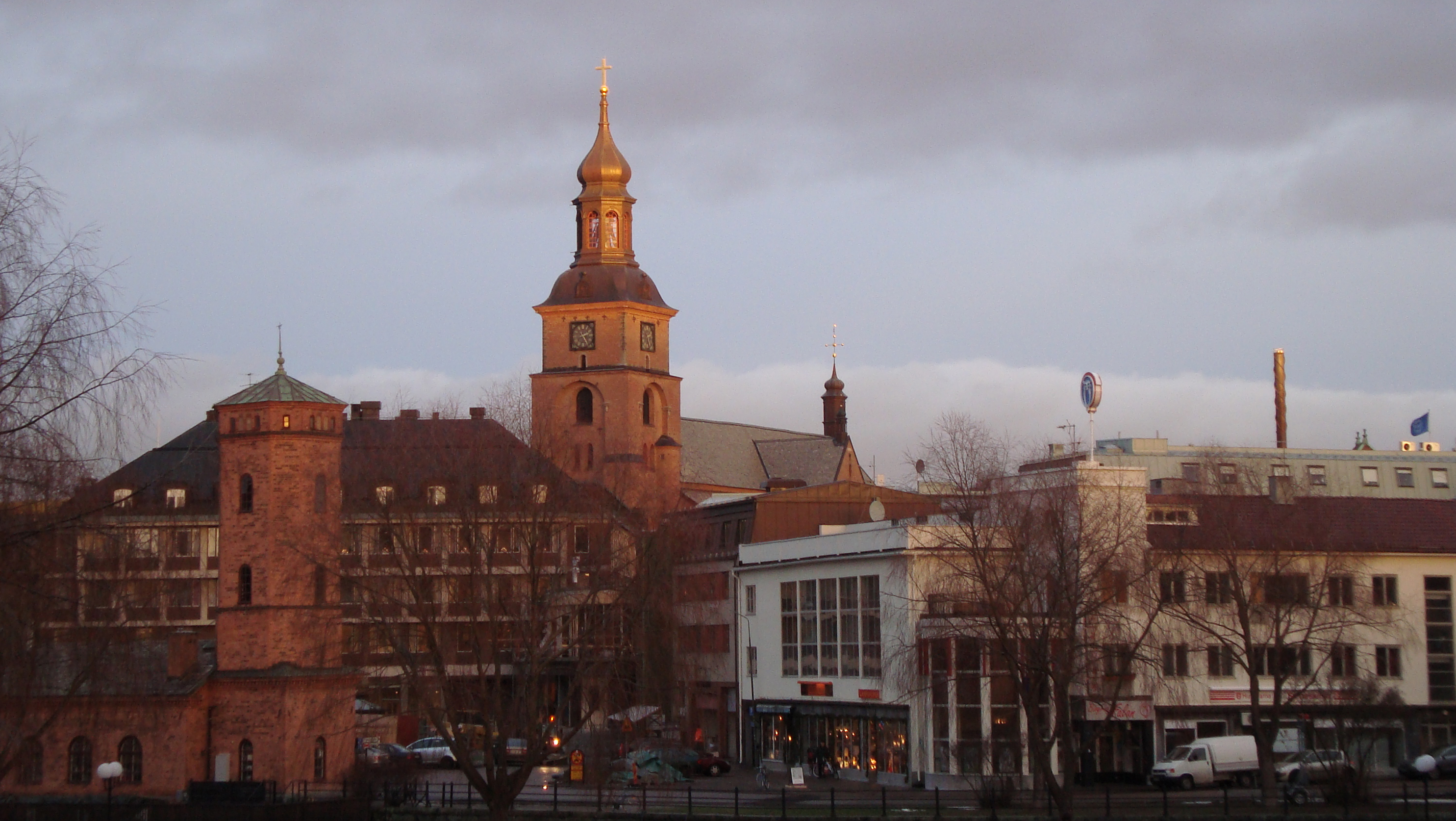
- Falun seen from the Sveriges Radio building

- Coat of arms

- Location within Dalarna Location within Sweden
- Coordinates: 60°36′26″N 15°37′52″E
- Country: Sweden
- Province: Dalarna
- County: Dalarna County
- Municipality: Falun Municipality
- Charter: 1641

Area
  - City: 27.1716 km^{2} (10.4910 sq mi)
  - Metro: 2,052.65 km^{2} (792.53 sq mi)
- Elevation: 110 m (360 ft)

Population (31 December 2022)
  - City: 55,344
  - Density: 1,372/km^{2} (3,550/sq mi)
- Time zone: UTC+1 (CET)
  - Summer (DST): UTC+2 (CEST)
- Postal code: 791 xx
- Area code: (+46) 23
- Climate: Dfb
- Website: www.falun.se

Falun (Swedish pronunciation: [ˈfɑ̂ːlɵn]) is a city and the seat of Falun Municipality in Dalarna County, Sweden, with 37,291 inhabitants in 2010. It is also the capital of Dalarna County. Falun forms, together with Borlänge, a metropolitan area with just over 100,000 inhabitants.

Falun was originally famous for its copper mine, and is today an important service and industrial city even though the mine is closed (since 1992).

Faluån is a river, flowing through the city, separating it into two sides. Falu copper mine is located on one of the sides which during many centuries was one of Sweden's main business. This side of the river was usually called "the mining side", where not many plants grew due to the toxic smoke which contaminated the soil. On the other side of the river, where the smoke did not reach, set many large villas, which made this side to be called "the delightful side". The centre of Falun consists of classical pedestrian streets with small shops. In 1998, the city claimed the award of "the city centre of the year" in Sweden.

In 2001, the city, the copper mine, and mining areas of Falun were added to the list of world heritage sites by the United Nations. Dalarna University, with its 18 000 students, has a campus located in Falun ― close to the national ski stadium where the FIS Nordic World Ski Championships has taken place a number of times, most recently in 2015.

The name of Falun has influenced the names of some Swedish items associated with the town, such as Falu red (a paint color), Falu rågrut (a type of rye crispbread), Falu ättika (a type of distilled vinegar) and Falukorv.

Falun is home to the power metal band, Sabaton, who is referred to as one of the most popular Swedish rock bands of all time, one of the “big 4 of Power Metal”, and have released the most popular heavy metal album in Swedish history, Carolus Rex.

== History ==
The town of Falun is known to have existed in the 14th century as a market place for the surrounding lands. Mining for copper had been a local business since the mid-13th century, or possibly as early as 1000, and the organisation for the extracting of copper and gold from Stora Kopparberget is believed to be the oldest still-existing enterprise in the world, proved active since 1347, when its charter was granted by King Magnus IV of Sweden. The first share in the company is dated as early as 1288.

However, an enterprise at that time was nothing more than a cooperative among the owners, each contributing with a share of money for construction, tools, etc., necessary to run the organisation. Depending on their contributions they could use the facilities and share the profits in proportion to the relative sizes of their individual contributions.

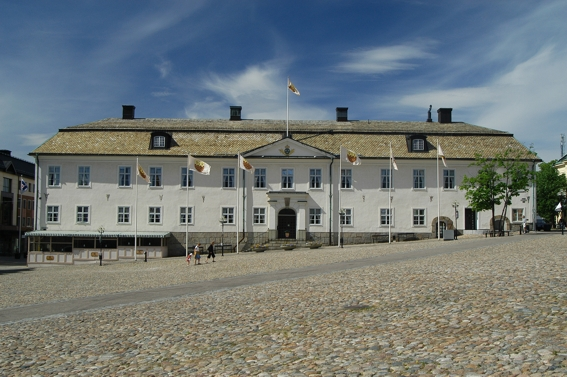
Falun town hall (Rådhuset)

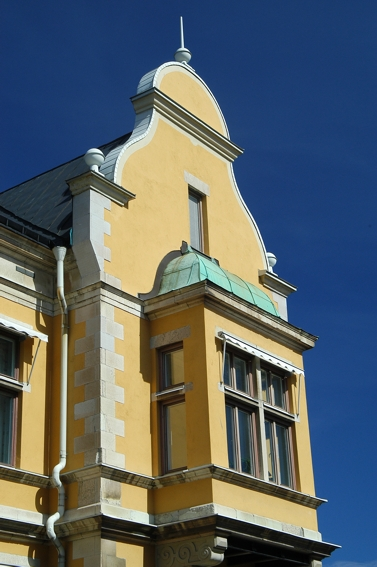
Masmaster premises in Falun

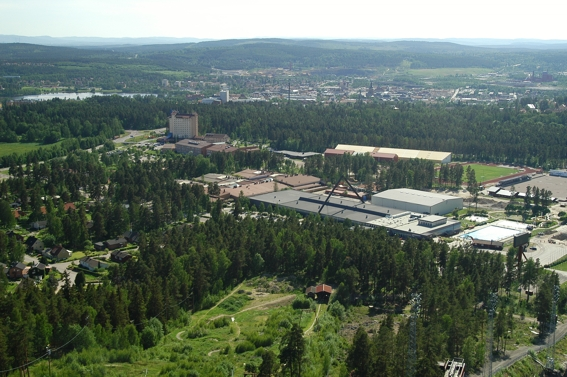
View from ski-jump on Falun

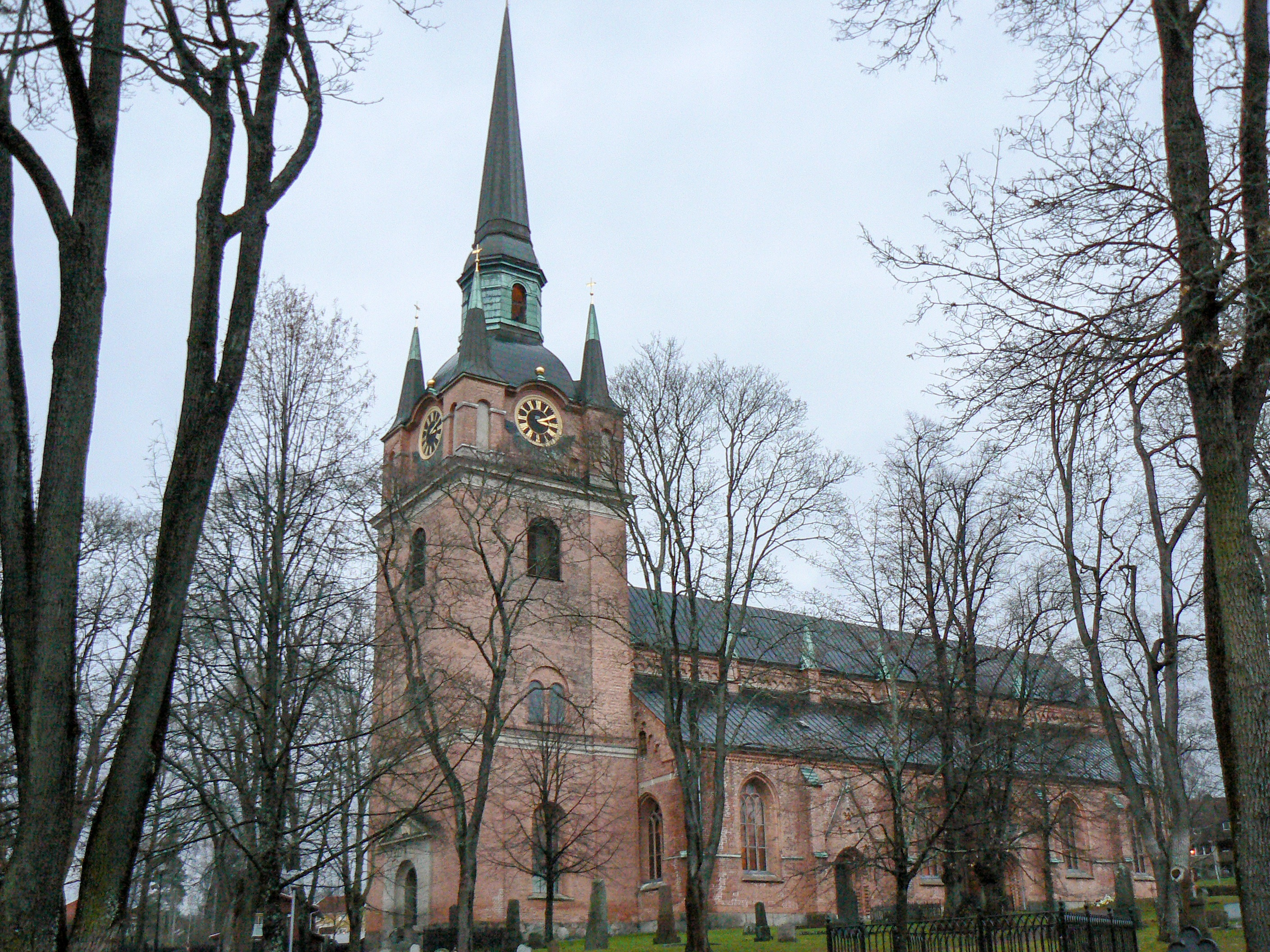
Stora Kopparbergs kyrka

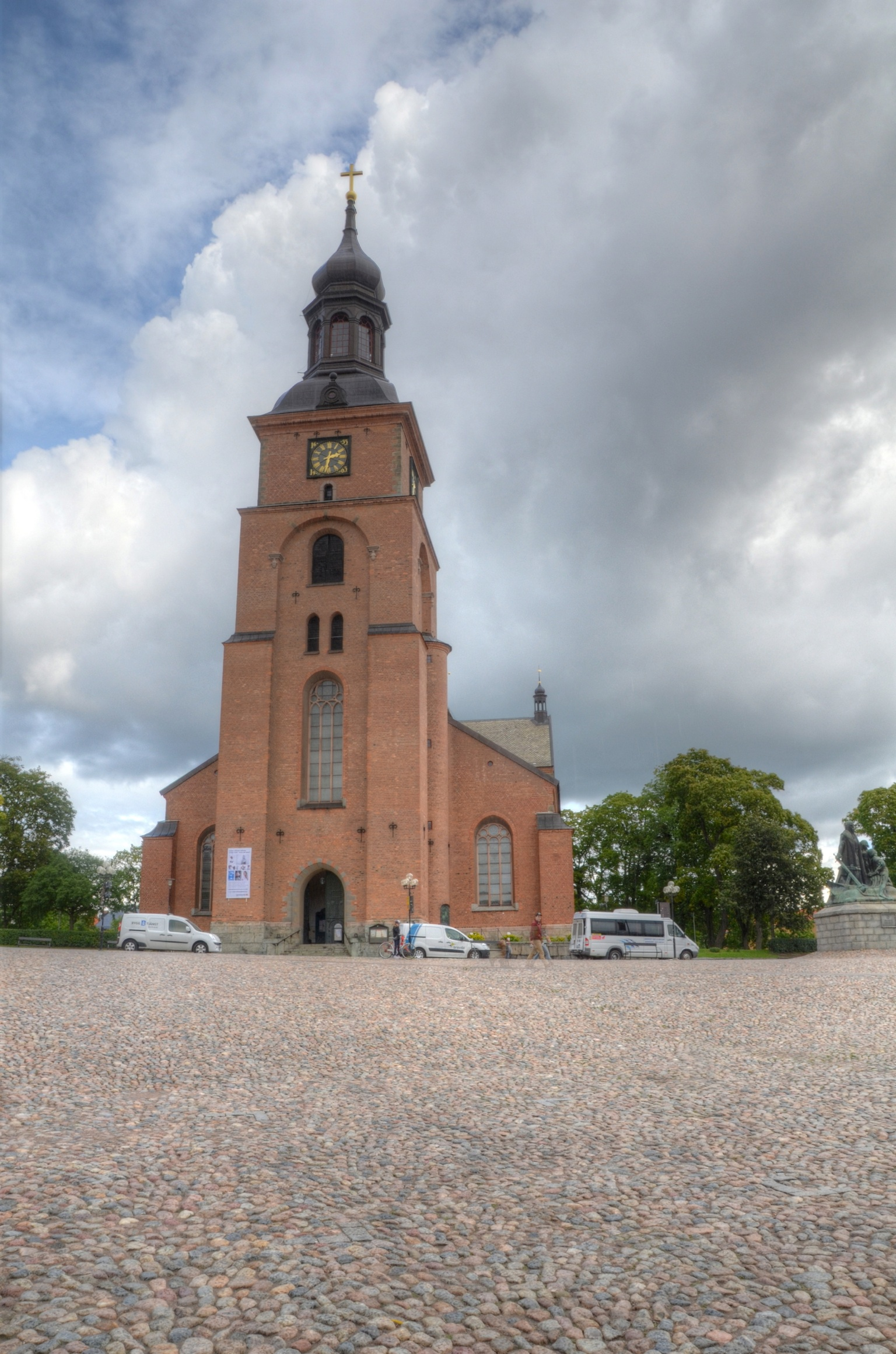
Church in Falun

The city of Falun received its privileges in 1641. By then Falun was already one of the largest cities in Sweden, with about 6000 inhabitants. Soon, however, the importance of the copper mine began to decrease. In 1687, parts of the mine collapsed in a landslide, creating a 100 m deep pit. Even though the mine remained in use for the next 300 years, the production gradually diminished, until it closed down in 1992.

The mining area of the Falun Mine has been declared a UNESCO World Heritage Site, which also was the name of the mining company of Falun, is today a part of Stora Enso.

During World War II, Falun was the place where the authorities "interned" British and American airmen who happened to land in Sweden or reached the country after landing in German-controlled territories. Unlike civilian refugees from Germany, who were kept in internment camps throughout the country, British and American airmen were placed in hotels and bed and breakfast establishments in the Falun area, and enjoyed relative freedom.

== Climate ==
Falun has a humid continental climate (Dfb).

Winter is the longest season lasting approximately from mid-November until the end of March, although March daytime temperatures tend to be mild. With an average high temperature of 23 °C (73.4 °F), July is the warmest month. However, the all-time heat record was set on August 4, 2014, when 35.1 °C (95.2 °F) was measured. This was, in turn, the highest measured temperature of the intense heatwave that summer that affected most of Scandinavia. The climate of Falun is more continental than most of Sweden since it is relatively far from large bodies of waters moderating temperatures. As a result, the highs of July in Falun are normally warmer than many areas much further south in the country. Winters, however, are cold but also highly variable due to the proximity to some maritime influence that often brings mild temperatures above freezing, moderating average temperatures. The most precipitation occurs during the summer months of July and August. The lowest temperature ever recorded in Falun is −40.0 °C (−40.0 °F). The weather station has however, not recorded below −37.2 °C (−35.0 °F) according to the open data.

Climate data for Falun (2002–2018 averages; sunshine in Borlänge; extremes since 1901)
Month	Jan	Feb	Mar	Apr	May	Jun	Jul	Aug	Sep	Oct	Nov	Dec	Year
Record high °C (°F)	12.2 (54.0)	12.0 (53.6)	17.9 (64.2)	26.4 (79.5)	29.8 (85.6)	33.2 (91.8)	33.3 (91.9)	35.1 (95.2)	27.0 (80.6)	21.8 (71.2)	15.3 (59.5)	12.2 (54.0)	35.1 (95.2)
Mean maximum °C (°F)	5.0 (41.0)	6.3 (43.3)	13.3 (55.9)	19.3 (66.7)	25.2 (77.4)	27.8 (82.0)	29.8 (85.6)	27.8 (82.0)	22.0 (71.6)	15.6 (60.1)	10.4 (50.7)	6.2 (43.2)	30.9 (87.6)
Mean daily maximum °C (°F)	−1.9 (28.6)	−0.6 (30.9)	4.5 (40.1)	11.2 (52.2)	17.0 (62.6)	20.9 (69.6)	23.6 (74.5)	21.3 (70.3)	16.3 (61.3)	8.7 (47.7)	3.4 (38.1)	−0.1 (31.8)	10.4 (50.6)
Daily mean °C (°F)	−4.9 (23.2)	−4.0 (24.8)	−0.1 (31.8)	5.5 (41.9)	11.1 (52.0)	15.1 (59.2)	17.9 (64.2)	16.2 (61.2)	11.8 (53.2)	5.3 (41.5)	0.9 (33.6)	−2.9 (26.8)	6.0 (42.8)
Mean daily minimum °C (°F)	−7.9 (17.8)	−7.4 (18.7)	−4.7 (23.5)	−0.2 (31.6)	5.1 (41.2)	9.2 (48.6)	12.1 (53.8)	11.0 (51.8)	7.2 (45.0)	1.8 (35.2)	−1.6 (29.1)	−5.7 (21.7)	1.6 (34.8)
Mean minimum °C (°F)	−20.1 (−4.2)	−17.8 (0.0)	−13.5 (7.7)	−6.1 (21.0)	−1.9 (28.6)	3.4 (38.1)	6.6 (43.9)	4.6 (40.3)	0.3 (32.5)	−5.7 (21.7)	−10.4 (13.3)	−16.2 (2.8)	−22.4 (−8.3)
Record low °C (°F)	−35.6 (−32.1)	−37.2 (−35.0)	−28.6 (−19.5)	−19.0 (−2.2)	−10.0 (14.0)	−2.2 (28.0)	2.5 (36.5)	0.4 (32.7)	−5.1 (22.8)	−14.0 (6.8)	−24.0 (−11.2)	−35.6 (−32.1)	−37.2 (−35.0)
Average precipitation mm (inches)	41.0 (1.61)	28.7 (1.13)	24.9 (0.98)	26.5 (1.04)	52.4 (2.06)	68.6 (2.70)	77.0 (3.03)	79.1 (3.11)	43.5 (1.71)	58.0 (2.28)	46.8 (1.84)	37.8 (1.49)	584.3 (22.98)
Mean monthly sunshine hours	47.7	74.8	164.0	213.8	238.5	257.7	256.8	210.9	157.8	107.3	54.4	47.0	1,830.7
Source 1: SMHI Open Data
Source 2: SMHI average data 2002–2018

Falun

Climate chart (precipitation, max. and min. temperature)
J	F	M	A	M	J	J	A	S	O	N	D
41 −2 −8	29 −1 −7	25 5 −5	27 11 0	52 17 5	69 21 9	77 24 12	79 21 11	44 16 7	58 9 2	47 3 −2	38 0 −6
- █ Average max. and min. temperatures in °C
- █ Precipitation totals in mm
Imperial conversion
J	F	M	A	M	J	J	A	S	O	N	D
1.6 29 18	1.1 31 19	1 40 24	1 52 32	2.1 63 41	2.7 70 49	3 74 54	3.1 70 52	1.7 61 45	2.3 48 35	1.8 38 29	1.5 32 22
- █ Average max. and min. temperatures in °F
- █ Precipitation totals in inches

== Architectural history ==
Stora Gruvstugan was designed by Eric Geisler and built between 1771 and 1785 in a Rococo Style, also referred to as Late Baroque. The building is situated by Falun Copper Mine and used to be the main office to the copper mine. In 1882 the building was rebuilt into Berslagets museum. At the beginning of 1920, the mining came close to the structure which made it fragile and extensive repairs were made to the building.

Västra Skolan was built in 1915, based on a design by the city architect in Falun, Klas Boman. The building functioned as a school up until 2010. The tower was a replica of Kristine Kyrka, XVIIth century parish church of Falun, from which one could view the entire low built the city.

Egnellska Huset was built in 1903, and was designed by Falun's first city architect, Klas Boman. The building functioned as a modern residential building. The building was initially a light yellow color and then later recolored in a more bright yellow color. After two separate fires in 2007 and 2008, the building was restored to its original appearance.

Falugatan is a street in Falun and has since the 15th century functioned as a connection between eastern and western Falun. Thanks to its location by the river, this site became an important commerce site for the city. When Falun, officially became a city, in 1641, it was this street that named the city to Falun. The street kept its appearance up until the 1960s when Falun was modernized architectural. During the 1960', four of the five 18th-century buildings were demolished and today, the Körsnerska Huset is the only one remaining in its original appearance.

Centralpalatset, Falun is a building located on Stora Torget in Falun and is a monumental building, decorated in Art Nouveau. It was built between 1895 and 1896, and was designed by the local architect Ferdinand Boberg. The author Selma Lagerlöf lived in the building, and it was here she wrote The Wonderful Adventures of Nils. In 1947, the initial balconies were removed and in 1955 the whole building was facing a renovation where the facade was redesigned and the whole house scaled-down, making it shorter and flatter

Wiklunds Glas was a building on Åsgatan in Falun and was designed in a combination between Art Nouveau and Renaissance in the Low Countries. The building was designed by the architect J.Wernfeldt and functioned as a location for a glass company. The building was demolished in 1971, when Falun was modernized.

Geislerska Huset was built sometime between 1765 and 1768 by Eric Geisler. The building was built by a technique which later became referred to as Eric Geisler Technique. It was the oldest building in the world built with copper slag stone. The building was demolished in 1977, and on the site today is an office building.

Rådhuset (Town Hall) is located on Stora Torget in Falun. Was built between 1649 and 1653, initially as a one-floor building, but in the 1960s, a second floor was added onto the building. In 1761, the building was destroyed in a fire, but was quickly rebuilt and is still, today, standing on the same site.

Varmbadhuset a community swimming pool facility in Falun. It was designed in a National Romantic Style by the city architect Klas Boman and built in 1911. In the 1960s a sports center was planned out for Falun and Varmbadhuset lost its importance and faced demolition in 1974, despite strong protests from the residents in Falun. On the site today is the police station.

In 1961, an architectural competition was organized in Falun. The neighborhood (Falan) between the western side of Stora Torget and Faluån was to be modernized. The competition was won by Uhlin och Malms Arkitektkontor in Stockholm. The final design was built in 1968, with two buildings along the western side of the Plaza. Since 1968, the buildings have been rebuilt many times.

== Education ==
There is a number of elementary schools in Falun, as well as a number of high schools.

For education, the city holds part of the University College of Dalarna (Högskolan Dalarna).

== Today ==
In sports, Falun hosts the annual Swedish Ski Games at its skiing arena Lugnet, Falun. The city's most successful sports team is the bandy team Falu BS which has played in the Swedish top division for many years. Also, IBF Falun, the floorball male and female teams, have been very successful. Falu FK play in Division 2 Norra Svealand.

Lugnet, Falun Stadium has also hosted the FIS Nordic World Ski Championships four times: 1954, 1974, 1993 and most recently in 2015.

The city lost out to Calgary, Alberta, Canada, in 1981 for the 1988 Winter Olympics. Again, Falun applied for the 1992 Winter Olympics but lost out to Albertville, France, in 1986. The city lost despite the best efforts of one of ABBA's singers who recorded a single in support of the bid.

Falun is the home of 'The Battle', a snowboard competition.

Iron and Copper byproducts from the mine are still used as a paint ingredient, in the production of the nationally well known and culturally important Falu Red paint, particularly used on wooden houses.

== Notable people ==
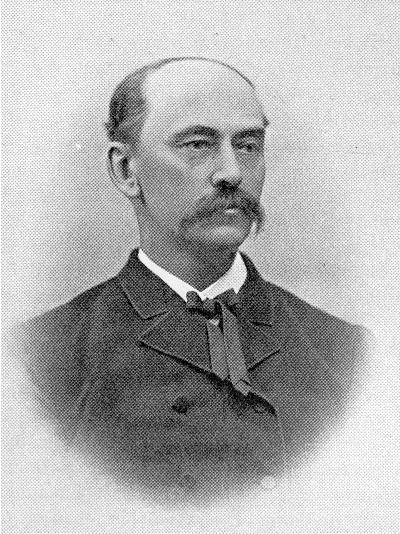
Oscar Alin, 1910

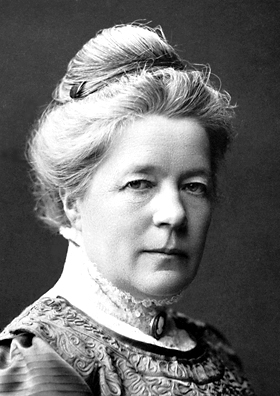
Selma Lagerlöf, 1909

- Oscar Alin (1846–1900) historian and politician.
- Sture Bergwall, (born 1950), falsely convicted of serial murder
- Ferdinand Boberg, (1860–1946) architect
- Isak Gustaf Clason, (1856-1930) architect
- Bolaget (founded 2019), band
- Palne Mogens Mogensen, (1900-1969) architect
- Joakim Brodén, (born 1980) founder and lead vocalist of power metal band Sabaton
- Brothers of Metal, (founded 2012) power metal band
- Elma Danielsson, (1865–1936), journalist and politician
- Björn Dixgård, (born 1981) musician (Mando Diao)
- Jorian Engelbrektsson, (born 1982) pinball champion
- Fet-Mats, (died 1677) a natural mummy found in Sweden in 1719.
- Selma Lagerlöf, (1858–1940) author, awarded the 1909 Nobel Prize in Literature
- Lina Leandersson, (born 1995) actress
- Bertil Lintner, (born 1953) journalist
- Kristian Matsson (born 1983) musician, stage name The Tallest Man on Earth
- Henrik Petrini, (1863–1957) mathematician
- Ernst Rolf, (1891–1932), actor and singer
- Georg Skarstedt, (1900–1976) actor
- Vincent Skoglund, (born 1974), photographer
- Georg Stiernhielm, (1598–1672) civil servant, mathematician, linguist and poet.
- Gunnar Säve-Söderbergh, (1910–1948) palaeontologist and geologist.
- Pär Sundström, (born 1981) founder and Bassist of power metal band Sabaton
- Twilight Force, (founded 2011) power metal band
- Putte Wickman, (1924–2006) jazz clarinetist
- Hellforce, (founded 2011) Heavy metal band
- Teeraphat Nuchit, (born 2005) artist
- Ceicilia Forss, (born 1985) actress

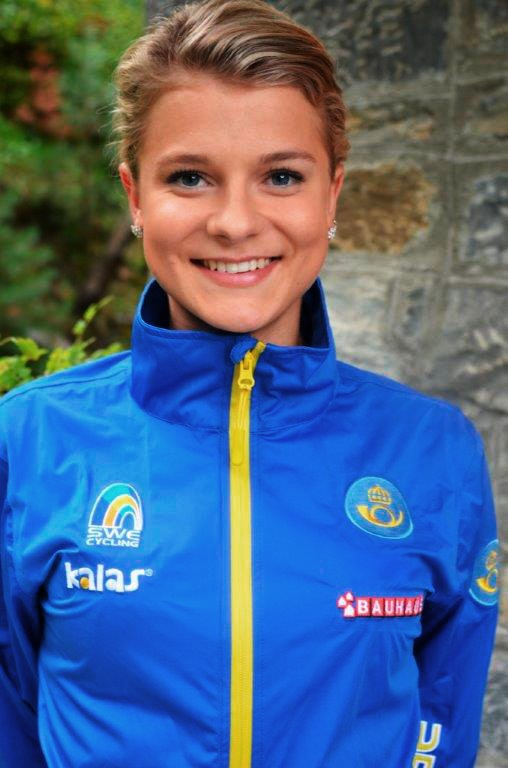
Jenny Rissveds, 2016

=== Sport ===
- Adam Boqvist (born 2000), ice hockey player
- Jesper Boqvist (born 1998), ice hockey player
- Zećira Mušović (born 1996), footballer
- Mattias Ekström (born 1978), racing driver
- Samuel Ersson (born 1999), ice hockey goaltender
- Maria Hjorth (born 1973), golfer
- Tomas Jonsson (born 1960), former ice hockey player, now coach
- Anders Kallur (born 1952), former ice hockey player
- Jenny Kallur (born 1981), athlete, World Championships finalist 2005 in 100 m hurdles
- Susanna Kallur (born 1981), athlete, World Record Holder 60 meter hurdles
- Scott Kin Lindblom (born 2010), racing driver
- Marcus Ljungqvist (born 1974), former road bicycle racer
- Jenny Rissveds (born 1994), Olympic Champion Rio 2016, U23 Mountain Bike World Champion 2016
- Walter Steiner (born 1951), former ski jumper
- Ulf Stenlund (born 1967), former tennis player
- Mats Gren (born 1963), former footballer

== In popular culture ==
The short story "Die Bergwerke zu Falun" ("The Mines of Falun") was published by E. T. A. Hoffmann in 1819, based on what happened to Fet-Mats Israelsson.

== See also ==
- Biathlon World Championships
- Falukorv
- Thomas Quick
- Älgen Stolta
- Falun red

== Sports ==
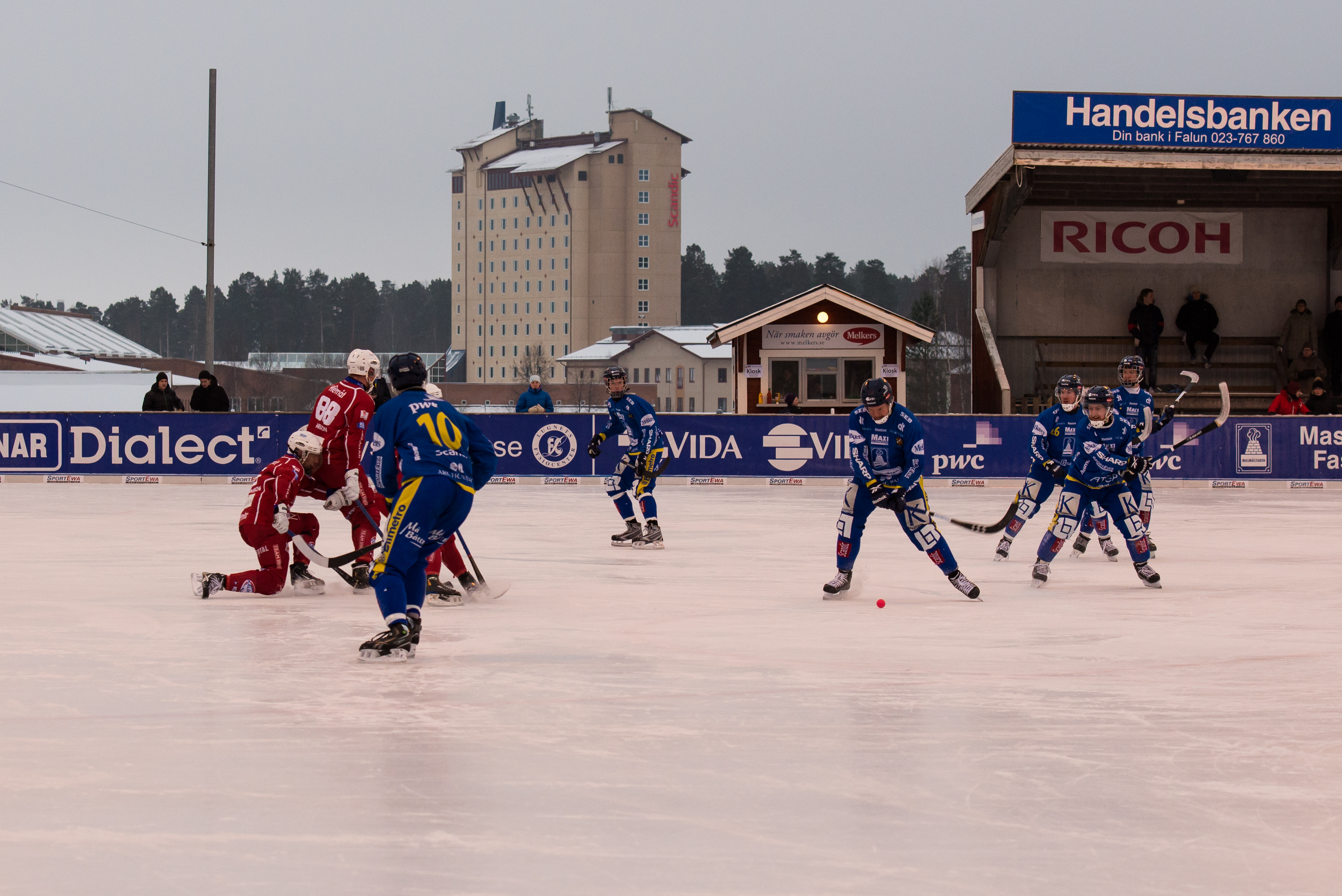
The bandy team of Falu BS executing a corner

The following sports clubs are located in Falun:

- Falu BS
- Falu FK
- Korsnäs IF FK
- Slätta SK
- IBF Falun

== Annual music festival ==
Starting in 2008 Falun has been the home of a rock and metal festival called Sabaton Open Air: Rockstad Falun.
