= List of superlative trees in Sweden =

Sweden's superlative trees have been ranked by various factors. Records have been kept for trees with superlative height, wood volume, age, and stoutness (meaning trunk diameter or girth).

Superlative trees of Sweden. S= stoutest, T=Tallest, O= Oldest.
Superlative trees in Southern Sweden. S= stoutest, O= oldest.

List of superlative trees in Sweden
| Species | Record | Tree name | Location | Picture | References |
|---|---|---|---|---|---|
| Norway spruce | Oldest clonal tree in Sweden, 9500 years | Old Tjikko | Fulufjället, Älvdalen, Dalarna County | | |
| Scots pine | Oldest non-clonal pine, at least 747 years old. Formerly it was thought a pine in Muddus National Park was the oldest. | n/a | Hornslandet, Hudiksvall, Gävleborg County | | |
| European larch | Stoutest larch, 5.19 m. | n/a | Gävle, Gävleborg County | | |
| Scots pine | Tallest pine in Sweden, 37.8 m | n/a | Gräsmark, Sunne, Värmland County | | |
| Norway spruce | Tallest native tree in Sweden, 49.3 m | n/a | Mölnbacka, Forshaga, Värmland County | | |
| Common oak | Largest deciduous tree in Sweden by volume | Ekeby oak | Ekerö, Stockholm County | | |
| Common juniper | Stoutest and oldest juniper in Sweden, 2.8 m and about 600 years old. | n/a | Rå, Askersund, Örebro County | | |
| Silver fir | Tallest tree in Sweden, 49.5 m. Rival spruces exists in Skåne (44 m) and Värmland (49.3 m). The tree is still growing and has a diameter of 3,3 m. | n/a | Omberg, Ödeshög, Östergötland County | | |
| Common ash | Stoutest ash in Sweden, 9.97 m | n/a | Djursö, Söderköping, Östergötland County | | |
| Common juniper | Tallest juniper in Sweden, 18.5 m. A 17.17 m high rival exists in Ryd, Vaggeryd. | n/a | Hannäs, Åtvidaberg, Östergötland County | | |
| Wych elm | Stoutest wych elm in Sweden, circumference of 7.8 m | n/a | Svensbo, Torpön, Ydre, Östergötland County | | |
| Hybrid, likely between Nordmann fir and silver fir | Stoutest hybrid fir in Sweden, 5.3 m | n/a | Asby, Ydre, Östergötland County | | |
| Common oak | Oldest non-clonal tree in Sweden. Stoutest oak in Sweden, more than 1000 years old | Rumskulla oak / Kvill oak | Vimmerby, Kalmar County | | |
| Common beech | Stoutest beech, 8.1 m | n/a | Nääs Castle, Lerum, Västra Götaland County | | |
| Scots pine | Stoutest pine, 4.5 m | n/a | Strängsered, Ulricehamn, Västra Götaland County | | |
| Norway spruce | Stoutest spruce, 5.83 m | n/a | Lindhult, Falkenberg, Halland County | | |
| Common beech | Tallest beech, 41 m. | n/a | Maltesholm, Kristianstad, Skåne County | | |

== See also ==
- List of individual trees
