= Fulufjellet National Park =

Protected area in Norway

- IUCN category II (national park)

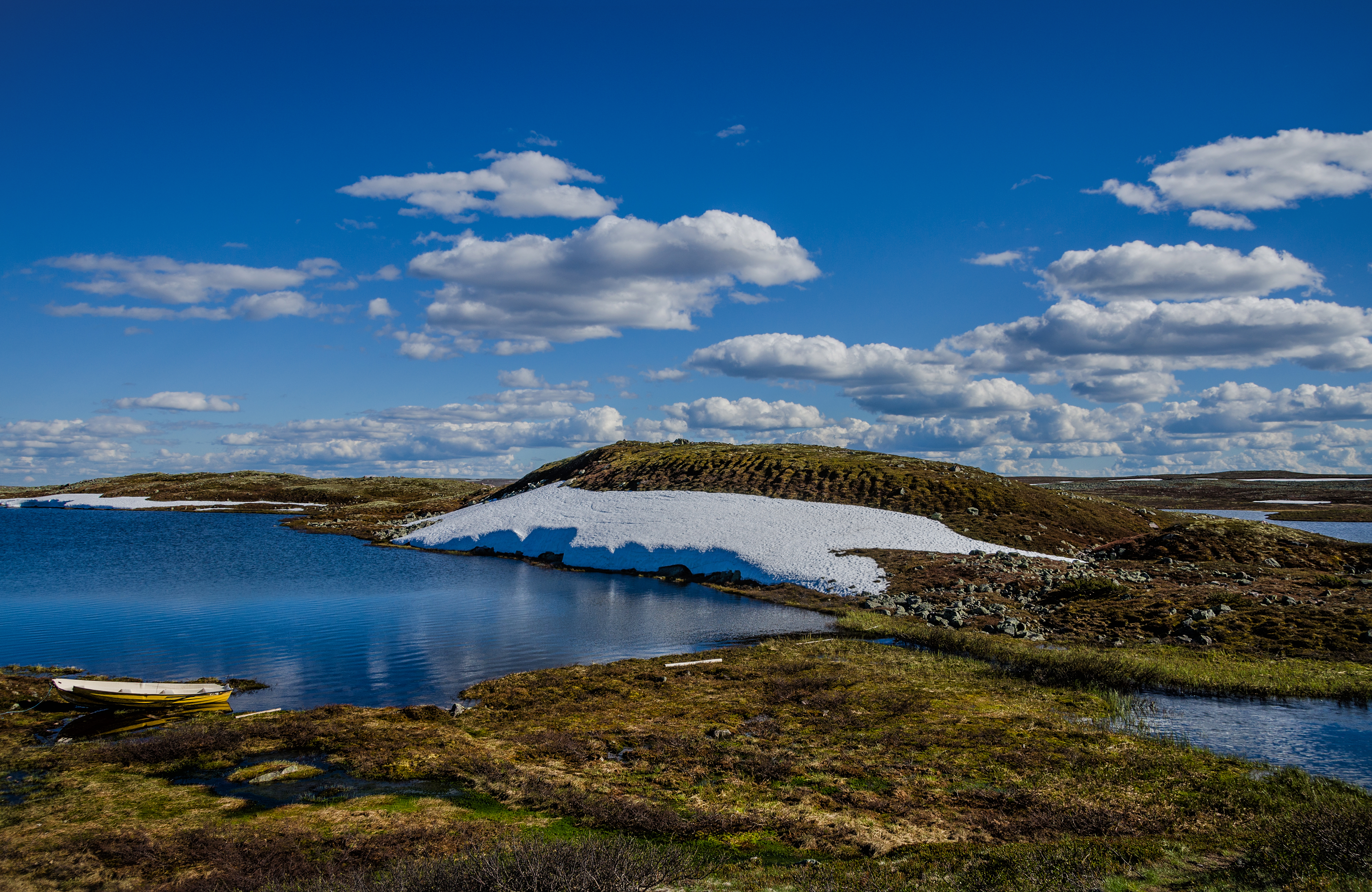
- Interactive map of Fulufjellet National Park
- Location: Trysil, Norway
- Coordinates: 61°28′N 12°41′E
- Area: 82.5 km^{2} (31.9 sq mi)
- Established: 24 April 2012
- Governing body: Norwegian Directorate for Nature Management

Fulufjellet National Park (Norwegian: Fulufjellet nasjonalpark) is an 82.5-square-kilometer (31.9 sq mi) national park located in Trysil Municipality, Norway. Established on 24 April 2012, its eastern border lies along the Norway–Sweden border and borders the Swedish Fulufjället National Park.

Topographic map of the area
