= Norra Kvill National Park =

National park in Sweden

- Norra Kvills nationalpark
- IUCN category II (national park)
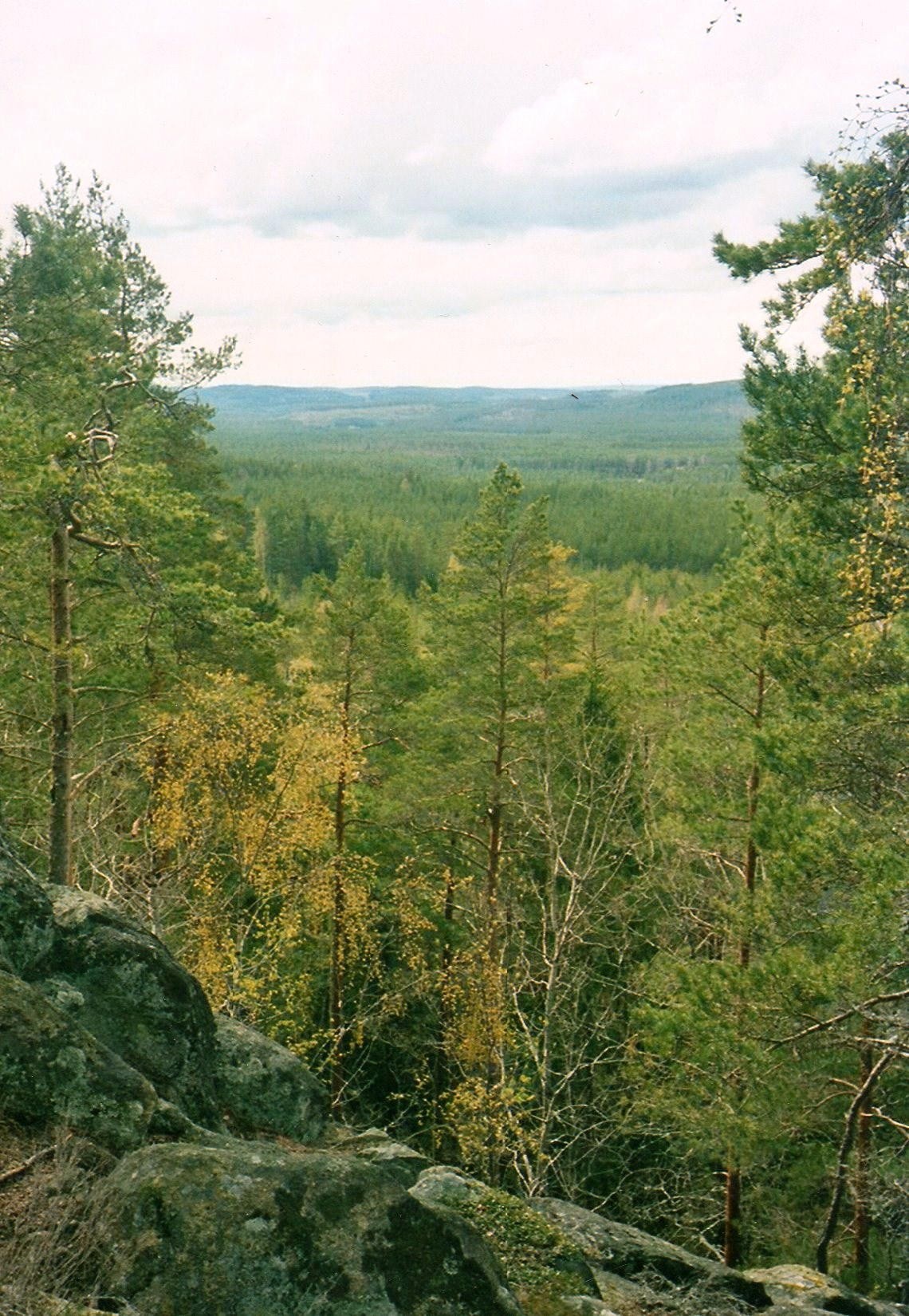
- Interactive map of Norra Kvill National Park
- Location: Kalmar County, Sweden
- Coordinates: 57°46′N 15°35′E
- Area: 1.14 km^{2} (0.44 sq mi)
- Established: 1927, extended 1989
- Governing body: Naturvårdsverket

Norra Kvill (literally North Kvill) is a small national park (established in 1927) near Vimmerby in Kalmar county, Småland, southeastern Sweden. A few kilometers from the park is the Rumskulla oak, Europe's largest English oak with a circumference of about 14 m (46 ft). The oak is thought to be about 1,000 years old.

National parks of Sweden (clickable map)
