= Fulufjället National Park =

National park in Sweden

- Fulufjällets nationalpark
- IUCN category II (national park)
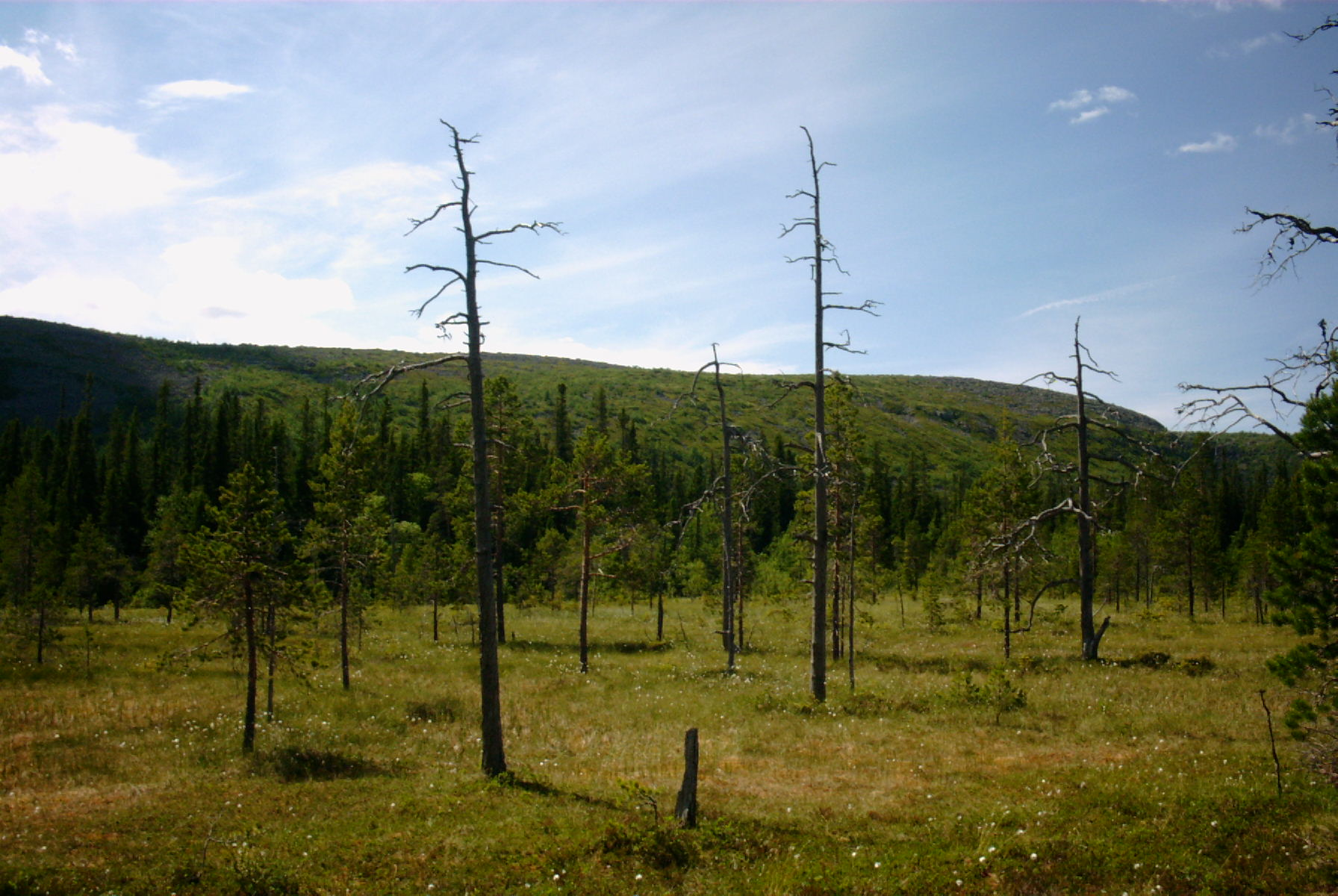
- Interactive map of Fulufjället National Park
- Location: Dalarna County, Sweden
- Nearest city: Älvdalen, Älvdalen Municipality
- Coordinates: 61°35′N 12°40′E
- Area: 385 km^{2} (149 sq mi)
- Established: 2002
- Visitors: 53,000 (in 2002)
- Governing body: Naturvårdsverket

National parks of Sweden (clickable map)

Fulufjället National Park (Swedish: Fulufjällets nationalpark) is a national park in central Sweden. Its total area is 385 km^{2} (149 mi^{2}), located entirely within Älvdalen Municipality in the province of Dalarna. It is named after the mountain Fulufjället, 1,044 m (3,425 ft) high. It covers the Swedish part of the Fulufjället massif, which is the southernmost part of the Scandes in Sweden. The Norwegian part of the massif is protected by Norway's Fulufjellet National Park.

The park is one of Sweden's most recent, inaugurated in September 2002 by King Carl XVI Gustaf at a ceremony attended by a few thousand spectators. The park has become one of the initial PAN Parks, an international project to combine preservation with tourism.

The Fulufjället massif is a high plateau deeply gouged by several rivers that flow into the mighty river Dalälven, which, far downstream, creates the unique topography of Färnebofjärden National Park. The geography is dominated by lichen, bare mountains, and valleys with dense old-growth forest. The heaths of brush, grass and lichens are unique in the Scandinavian Mountains, a result of the absence of grazing reindeers.

The park is a notable location for several species of birds, as well as brown bears and Eurasian lynx. The bold Siberian jay is the park's symbol. Notable sights include Sweden's largest waterfall, Njupeskär, with a total height of 93 m (305 ft), and a free fall of 70 m (230 ft). Growing in the park is the Old Tjikko, one of the world's oldest trees.

== Toponymy ==
The origin of the name Fulufjället is not known for certain: the suffix -fjället means "the mountain", but the first part (Fulu-) is not clear. In Ortnamn i Dalarna, Harry Ståhl suggests that this word comes from the Old Swedish fala meaning "pale" or "dim", like the names of the city of Falun and of the river Fulan. The mountain would have thus taken its name from the nearby river, or else from the city: a former road going from Trysil to Falun would indeed have gone over the mountain, and might therefore have been called "the mountain on Falun's road".

== Geography ==
=== Location and borders ===
Fulufjället National Park is in Älvdalen Municipality in Dalarna County, 25 km (16 mi) southwest of Särna. It extends along the Norwegian frontier over more than 38,483 ha (95,090 acres) (which is 385 km^{2} (149 sq mi)). It borders, on the other side of this national frontier, Fulufjellet National Park, which has an area of more than 82.5 km^{2} (31.9 sq mi). It is relatively far from the large cities of the country, Stockholm being about 400 km (250 mi) away; the nearest railway station and airport are at Mora, 140 km (87 mi) from the park.

=== Topology ===
Map of Fulufjället National Park in Sweden, together with Norway's Fulufjellet National Park

The park covers most of the Fulufjället massif (called Fulufjellet in Norwegian), which is 35 km (22 mi) long, and which spans the border between Sweden and Norway, so that a small southwestern part of it is in Norway. This massif makes up part of the Transtrandsfjällen, which is the southernmost part of the Scandes in Sweden. Fulufjället is a plateau of an altitude between 900 and 1,000 m (3,000 and 3,300 ft) with some round peaks. Slottet, 1,047 m (3,435 ft) in altitude, the highest point of the massif, is in Norway. On the Swedish side, in Fulufjället National Park, the highest point is Brattfjället at 1,042 m (3,419 ft), followed close behind by Storhön at 1,039 m (3,409 ft). At the southern and eastern extremities of the massif, the altitude drops brutally, about 600 m (2,000 ft) to the valley of Fuluälven. The plateau is gouged by several valleys, facing west (Bergådalen, Girådalen), south (Tangådalen) and east (Göljådalen).

=== Climate ===
Fulufjället is one of the parts of Scandinavia farthest from the sea. It therefore possesses a continental climate. The average temperature in the park is about 1 °C, with relatively high rainfall (835 mm (32.9 in) per year on average). The weather survey at nearby Särna gives an indication; but, being situated in a valley, its climate is drier. Although winter is drier than summer, the snow cover typically persists for 175 to 200 days each year.

However, Fulufjället's weather is very variable over time and space, both in terms of temperature and precipitation. In particular, the area experienced an extreme storm the night of 30–31 August 1997. At the lakes of Rösjöarna, 276 mm (10.9 in) of rain were collected in 24 h (86 ks) and the rainfall is estimated at 300 to 400 mm (16 in) further south. This was the largest amount of rain in a 24-hour period ever recorded in Sweden. There was significant damage in the park, in particular along the streams, the banks of which were violently eroded, ripping out all the vegetation there.

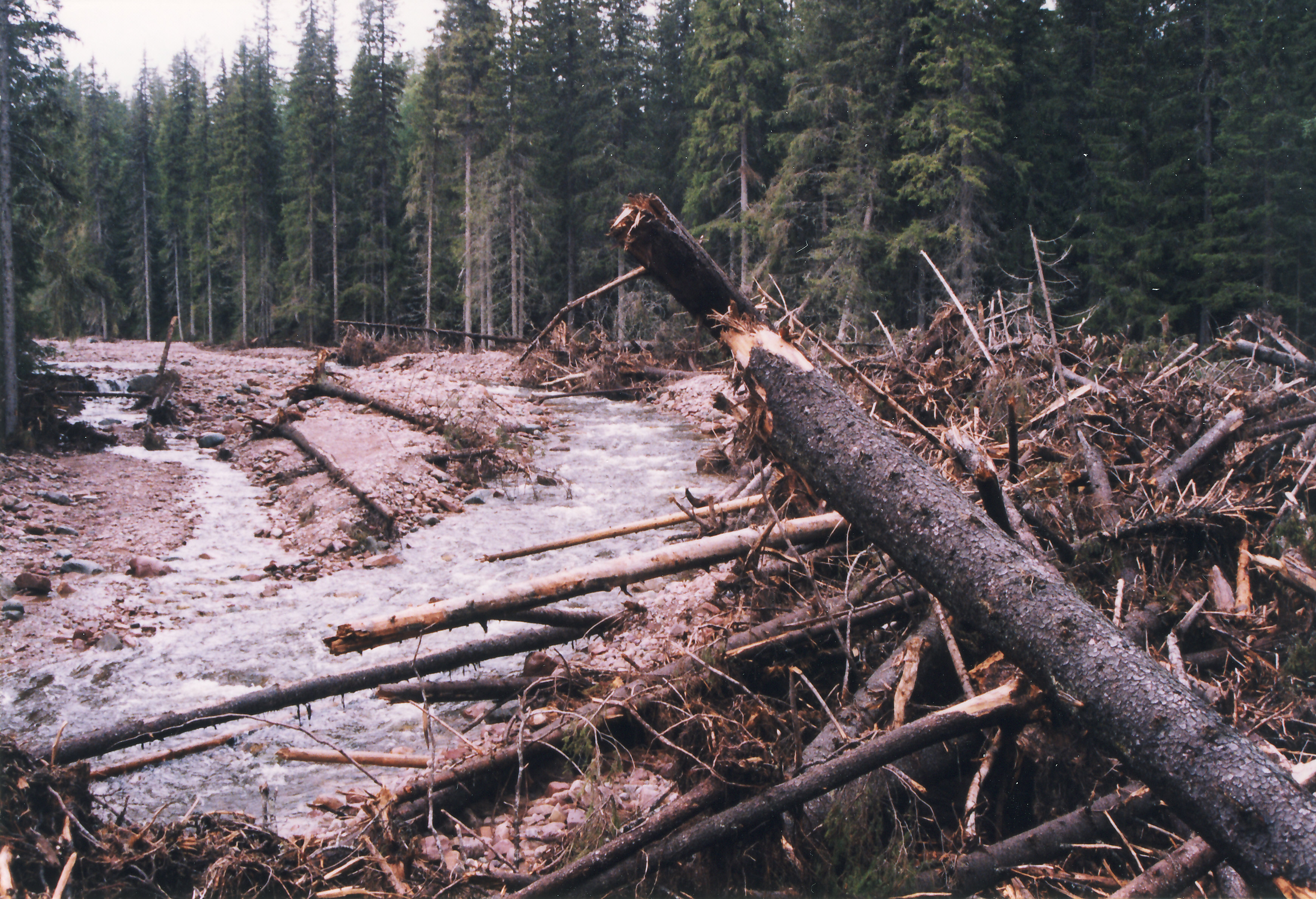
Traces from the destruction from a great 1997 storm at the river Stora Göljån

=== Hydrography ===
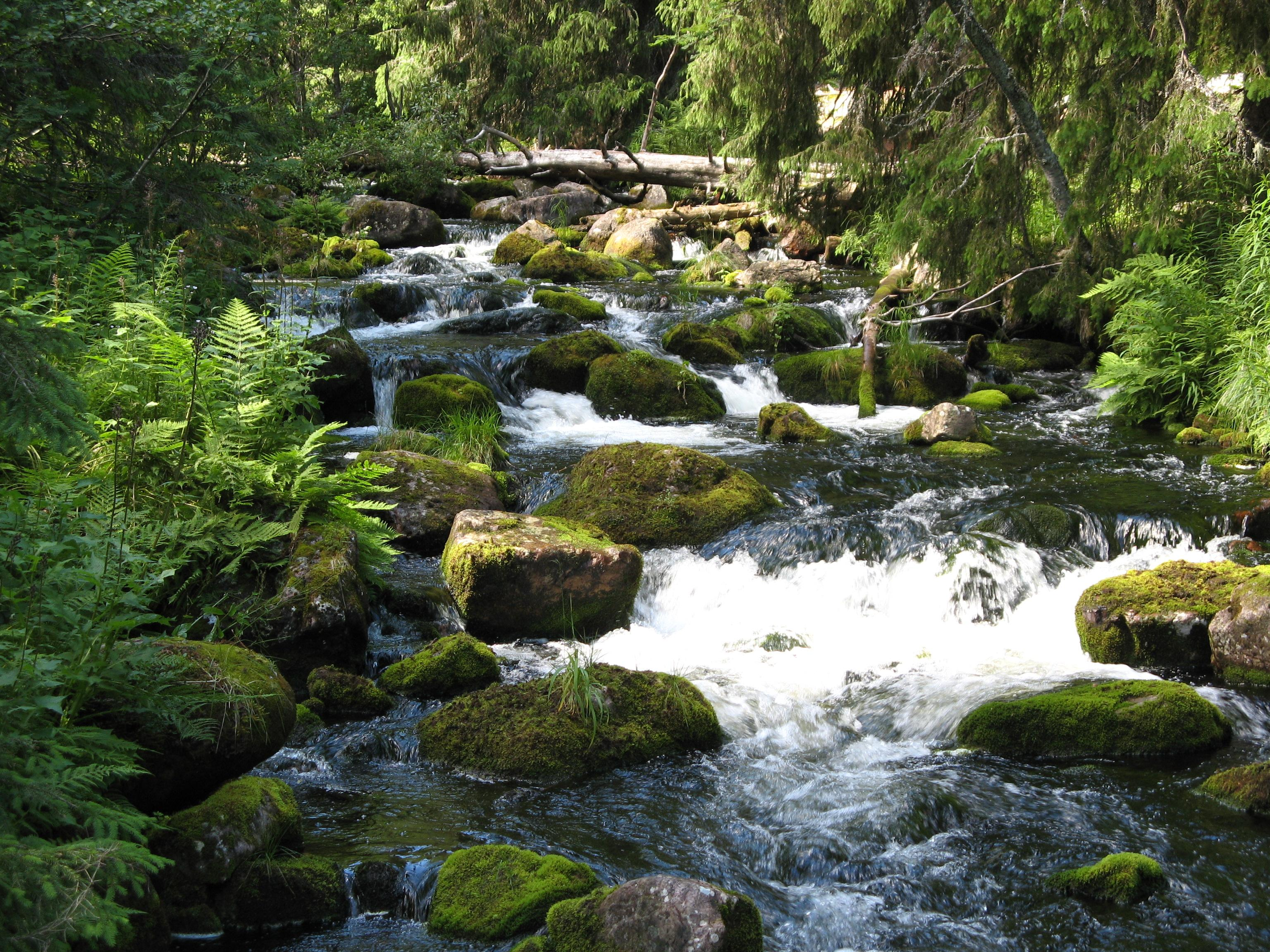
Mountain stream on Fulufjället

Many rivers have their source on the Fulufjället massif, the principal ones being the Tangån (1.5 m^{3}⋅s^{−1}), the Girån, the Bergån, the Fulubågan, the Stora Njupån, and the Stora Göljån (0.4 m^{3}⋅s^{−1}). The first three feed the river Görälven, which runs along the Fulufjället massif to the west, while the last three feed the river Fulan (also called Fuluälven), which runs along the massif to the east. The meeting of the Görälven and Fulan gives birth to the Västerdal River, which itself forms the great river Dalälven. One of the park's streams, Njupån, forms to the north of the plateau the waterfall Njupeskär, with a height of 93 m (305 ft) of which 70 m (230 ft) are free-fall, making it the highest waterfall in Sweden. The plateau, and in particular its southern part of less sharp topology, includes several important lakes, such as the Stora Rösjön (1.01 km^{2} (0.39 sq mi)), Stora and Lilla Harrsjön (0.77 and 0.65 km^{2} (0.30 and 0.25 sq mi)), Stora Getsjön (0.66 km^{2} (0.25 sq mi)), etc. These lakes are most often shallow and the abundance of precipitation refills them rapidly. This zone also includes many bogs with a total area of more than 20 km^{2} (7.7 sq mi), which is relatively little compared to the surrounding mountains.

== Geology ==
=== Rock ===
The Fulufjället massif is mostly sandstone. The sandstone was formed 900 million years ago, when this part of the Baltic tectonic plate was located near the equator. The climatic conditions there were thus desertic and the wind blew huge quantities of sand from the dunes into the ocean. These sediments were compacted at the bottom of the ocean and formed rock, specifically sandstone, in horizontal strata. This structure has been conserved, since it was little affected by the Caledonian orogeny.

This sandstone formation is very different from the rock one typically finds in Sweden (granite and gneiss). It is also very different from the rest of the Scandes, which are part of the Caledonian orogen. This sandstone is called the Dalecarlian sandstone, or the sandstone of Trysil on the Norwegian side. It constitutes the largest sandstone area in Sweden and reaches a thickness of 1,200 m (3,900 ft). The sandstone is usually reddish, but can also be gray, yellow, or brown.

At Fulufjället, the sandstone is veined with diabase. This diabase is particularly important in the area, since it forms a much richer substrate than sandstone for vegetation. Additionally, it resists erosion better than sandstone and therefore forms prominent structures in the countryside. For example, the peak Brattfjället, highest zone in the park, is situated in one of the largest diabase zones. The diabase is a little less than 300 million years old, which corresponds to the formation of the Oslo Rift. This suggests that these diabases are connected to that rifting event.

=== Formation of the countryside ===
The same forces that created the rest of the Scandes also created Fulufjället. Indeed, from about 60 million years ago, the west coast of Scandinavia and the northeast coast of the Americas underwent an important tectonic uplift. The causes of this phenomenon are not clear and many hypotheses have been proposed. One of these hypotheses is the lifting of the Earth's crust by the Iceland hotspot. Another hypothesis is isostasy connected to glaciation. This elevation seems to have been connected to different periods in the north and south of the Scandes, with the middle, between Trondheim and Östersund, a little depressed. In any case, this uplift allowed the formation of a vast flat zone several thousand meters high.

This area then underwent intense erosion, giving the countryside the shape one sees today. However, unlike the southernmost sections of the Scandes, such as those around Sarek National Park, the countryside around Fulufjället is not particularly marked by glacial erosion. Indeed, even at the height of glaciation during the Quaternary period, when the mountain was covered by an ice sheet, the movement of the ice was feeble, and did not significantly erode the massif. Instead, the most marked erosion took place during the Tertiary period, entirely under a tropical climate.

== Environment ==
The park is situated in the WWF terrestrial ecoregion Scandinavian and Russian taiga, even though a significant portion is situated above the treeline, and therefore becomes more like the Scandinavian Montane Birch forest and grasslands ecoregion.

=== The plateau ===
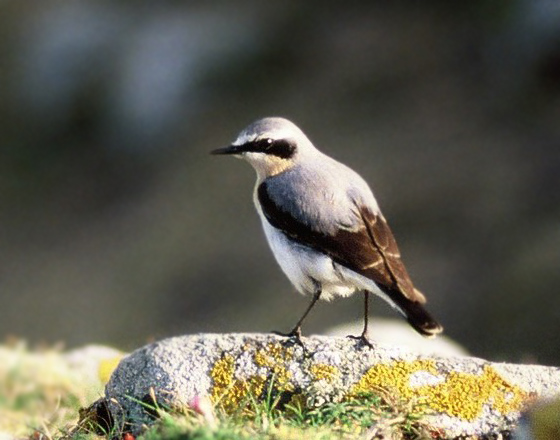
Northern wheatear

Because of the weather and the poverty of the soil, the plateau is mostly heath and bare dirt with only a few common juniper shrubs and some moor birches. The principal vascular plants one encounters are snowbed willow, Alpine bearberry, Alpine hawkweed, crowberry, cowberry, blue whortleberry and alpine azalea. But that which renders the vegetation of the Fulufjället plateau particularly unique in Sweden is its richness in lichens, with in particular the vast carpets of reindeer lichen and of fönsterlav, not affected there by the pasture of domestic reindeer, unlike most of the Swedish mountains. It is also in these inaccessible areas that one finds Old Tjikko, a Norway spruce 9,550 yr (301,000 Ms) old, making it one of the oldest trees in the world.

Few animals live in these areas; birds, mostly, such as the willow warbler, the meadow pipit, the northern wheatear, and these rarer ones: the European golden plover, the Eurasian dotterel, the snow bunting, and the Lapland longspur. The willow ptarmigan is relatively common, whereas the rock ptarmigan is found only on the highest peaks. For many of these species, Fulufjället is the southernmost part of their range in Sweden. (Note: p. 151)

=== Valleys and mountainside ===
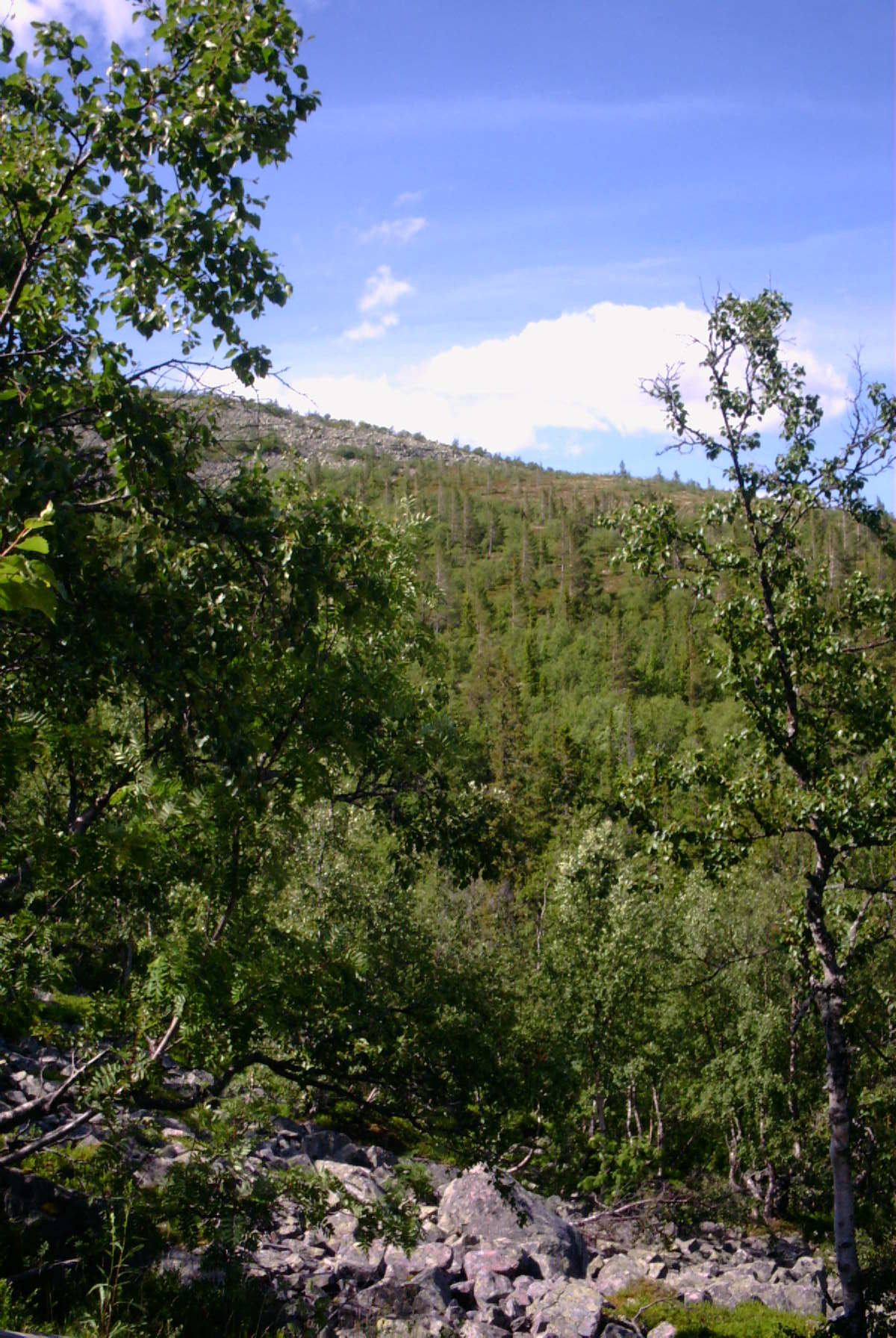
Forest on the slopes of Fulufjället

In the valleys and on the mountainside, in contrast, the diabase and the better weather permit a richer vegetation. In particular, these areas are blanketed in forest, with the plant species varying with altitude: moor birch, Scots pine and Norway spruce cover 4,100 ha (10,000 acres), 3,500 ha (8,600 acres) and 5,000 ha (12,000 acres), respectively. The undergrowth also presents great diversity in plant life. To wit, the south-facing slopes are principally covered in Scots pines and their undergrowth strongly resembles heath, with in particular common heather and crowberry. The rest of the coniferous forests include most often whortleberry, northern oak fern, woundwort, and common cow-wheat. The soil rich in diabase allows the growth of more demanding plants, such as Alpine blue-sow-thistle, wood cranesbill and northern wolfsbane. These zones also have a great number of species of moss; the park has more than a third of all the species of moss in the country.

The animal life in these areas is also relatively rich. The zone is particularly important to the brown bear, which likes to hibernate the winter away in dens along the mountainside. In spring, the brown bears descent to the plains, and only return to the mountain when the berries do. (Note: p. 140) These terrains are also favored stomping grounds of the Eurasian lynx. Both species, brown bear and Eurasian lynx, are protected in Sweden. Besides the red fox, the other predators, which are the wolverine, the gray wolf and the Arctic fox, are much rarer and do not have a fixed location in the park. The park shelters an important population of moose that pass the summer on the mountain, but prefer to spend the winter in areas less snowy. There are no more wild reindeerin the park, which is part of those few Swedish mountains not included in the area of pasture of domestic reindeer. Muskox, which left the area almost 4,000 years ago, were reintroduced in Norway and sometimes wander near the park. (Note: p. 142) Among the smaller animals, one can cite the red squirrel, the European pine marten, and the mountain hare. Like other Swedish mountains, the Norway lemming is present in Fulufjället, but in a patchy fashion, extremely numerous some years and almost absent others. This phenomenon is still not entirely understood. (Note: p. 141)

The wooded slopes are host to their own bird species, in particular the ring ouzel, the common raven, and the golden eagle. More generally, the forests have Eurasian three-toed woodpeckers, parrot crossbills, red crossbills, common redstarts, bramblings and Siberian jays, which last bird is the symbol of the park.

=== Wetlands ===
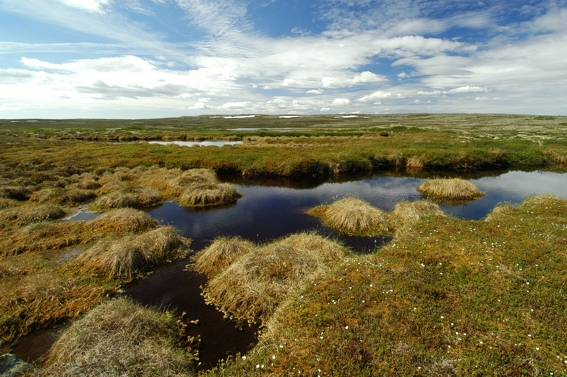
Wetlands on the plateau of Fulufjället

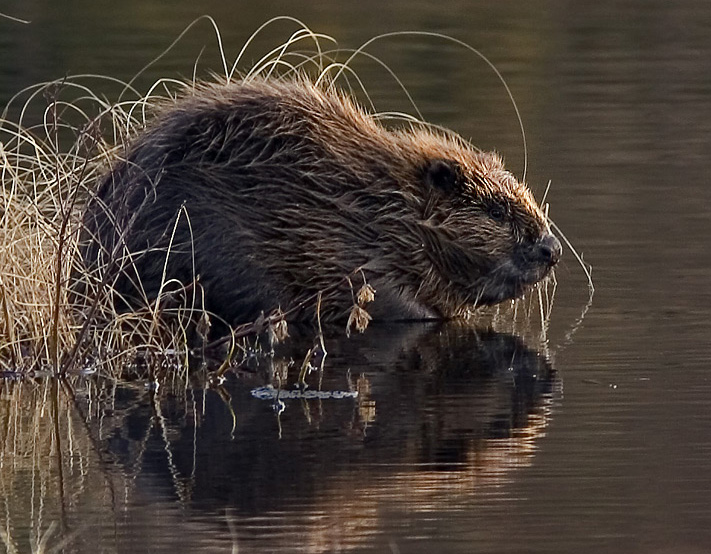
European beaver

Several marsh complexes exist in the park, but they are generally poor in vegetation, except for certain zones that the diabase rends richer in nutrients. However, along the mountainside streams, a rich carpet of vegetation was able to develop, with in particular alternate-leaved golden-saxifrage, chickweed willowherb, wolfsbane and wood stitchwort. At Njupeskär, conditions are especially favorable for the growth of wood sorrel, which does not normally grow so far south. These wetlands are also the most interesting areas for mosses and lichens; (Note: p. 164) (Note: p. 169) Fulufjället is one of the richest sites in all Sweden, with 394 species of moss and over 500 species of lichens found. The presence of these lichens is in part due to the fact that the park is not part of the territory of reindeer pasture.

These areas of water are inhabited by Eurasian beaver, which had disappeared some years ago due to intensive hunting, but which have now recovered their original population. Besides this, it is mostly a richness of birds that distinguishes the park's wetlands. It constitutes the southernmost extent in Sweden of the nesting area of many species, such as the greater scaup, the oldsquaw, the common scoter, and also a focus of important populations of red-necked phalarope, ruff, common greenshank and wood sandpiper. One also finds sometimes the Eurasian curlew, which is considered an endangered species.

The lakes are mainly populated with Arctic char, brown trout, and burbot. The waters of the park are renowned for their abundance and have been protected since 1962.

== History ==
=== Prehistory ===
Unlike the Norwegian part of the massif, the Swedish part is relatively poorly studied from an archeological point of view; as is often the case in the mountains, human traces are light. The mountain was freed from ice about 8,000 to 10,000 years ago and the first humans arrived during the Stone Age, their presence attested to by certain relics, such as a stone axe near the river Fulan. These people were hunter-gatherers, and had no fixed settlement, which remained the case up until the Iron Age.

Four Iron Age funerary cairns are among the most notable traces of that era. They are the only ones that have been discovered in Dalarna. They can be found in the northeast of the plateau, 2 km (1.2 mi) southeast of Njupeskär, and measure 2 to 4 m (6 ft 7 in to 13 ft 1 in) in length and a little less than 1 m (3 ft 3 in) meter in height. The tombs held arrowheads and spears. Another notable site is the Altarringen, an oval wall 5 m (16 ft) in diameter and 1 m (3 ft 3 in) high. In the middle of this ruin, an altar was created. Dating this ruin is difficult because of the numerous restorations it underwent.

However, during the Viking Age, some permanent settlements were constructed around Mora, for example, and one can figure that the first permanent settlements would have been established in the valleys of Fulufjället before the year 1000.

=== Middle Ages and the modern period ===
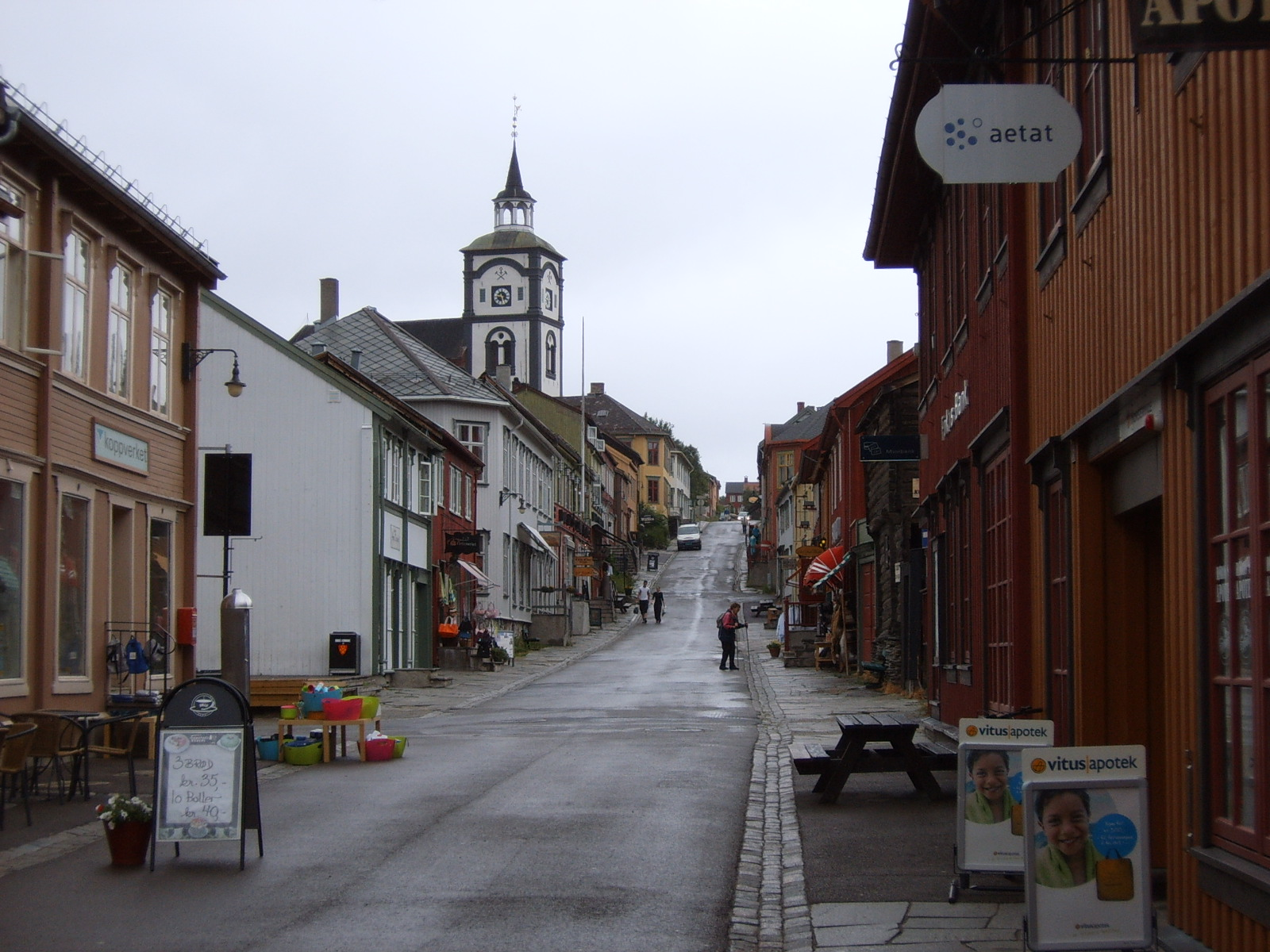
The city of Røros in Norway used enormous amounts of wood for its mine

The villages of Särna, Heden and Idre were probably established in connection with wild reindeer hunting; a trade in reindeer products existed with all of Europe. However, this trade declined in the 14th century.

In the Middle Ages, the area was frequently mapped, due to its location on the Sweden-Norway frontier, which has existed since 1273. In that era, the massif was entirely Norwegian, but in 1644, Sweden succeeded in capturing Särna during the Torstenson War. However, in 1645, the Second Treaty of Brömsebro failed to clearly define the frontier, and not until 1751, after negotiations, was the current frontier established. If the wrangling over the border seemed to take forever, all the more so since the zone was so trivial. The area around the mountain was not settled until later. This began on the Norwegian side: there was at least one farm at Ljørdalen in 1528. Not until the 18th century did the Swedish part become populated, initially with cabins for transhumance, for example at Mörkret. Virtual villages grew up after the beginning of the 19th century at Gördalen, Storbäcken, Storbron, Hägnåsen, Mörkret, Tjärnvallen and Lillådalen. Many of the park trails date from this era of transhumance.

Up until the 18th century, the area was used as a common hunting ground and pasture. Even though the mines at Røros required vast quantities of wood and coal, Fulufjället's transport problems initially spared it from logging. It was not until the second part of the 19th century that the logging industry took hold of the region, the wood being transported then by timber rafting. The river Görälven was used at first, once certain conflicts with Norway were put to rest. Exploitation of natural resources did not reach the most inaccessible zones until later, and certain parts were never exploited at all.

Among the other forms of exploitation of the zone, one can note the exploitation of a form of sandstone in the valley of Tangådalen.

=== Protection ===
The first protection of the zone was the classification in 1937 of 62.2 ha (154 acres) around Njupeskär as a crown reserve (domänreservat), which was the ancestor of the natural reserve in Sweden. In 1946, 365 ha (900 acres) of forest along the Göljån was similarly classified. Then 350 ha (860 acres) around Lövåsen were as well, and finally the reserve at Njupeskär was expanded to 342.2 ha (846 acres) in 1960. In 1964, the Njupeskär area became a natural park and was expanded to 525 ha (1,300 acres), and expanded again to 1,447 ha (3,580 acres) in 1970. In parallel, most of Fulufjället obtained a statute of protection, although relatively weak. In 1973, the entire area, totaling 38,060 ha (94,000 acres) came under the statute of natural reserves. In 1990, the pasturing of reindeer was forbidden.

In 1989, Fulufjället appeared in Naturvårdsverket's plan for the creation of new national parks. Negotiation with local authorities began the following year, but the project met opposition from the local population. (Note: p. 176) One of the arguments in favor of the creation of the park, beyond the simple protection of nature, was that it would draw more tourists, especially foreigners; (Note: p. 174) this was particularly important since while Idre and Sälen had succeeded in developing winter tourism, Särna had not. The project's opponents retorted that there was no reason that European tourists should choose to visit this distant mountain over the Alpes. (Note: p. 178) Besides that, the national park would necessitate a certain number of restrictions on the locals such as banning of snowmobile use, hunting, and fishing. The council of administration of Älvdalen Municipality heard the locals' negative opinion, and so opposed itself to the creation of the park. Naturvårdsverket and Dalarna County thus changed their strategy, and surveyed the locals to learn how they thought the mountain ought to be used. (Note: p. 179) Discussions continued following the publication of this study, and in 1999, the locals began to express favorable opinions. The park was no longer seen as a set of restrictions, but as an opportunity for the municipality. This led to the creation of the park in 2002. The official motive for the creation of the park was "to preserve an area of the central mountains with a distinctive vegetation and a great natural richness in a relatively intact state". It was the first Swedish national park established in the mountains since Padjelanta in 1962. The official inauguration was held 17 September 2002, in the presence of the king Carl XVI Gustaf of Sweden. The park is also part of the Natura 2000 Network since 1995 and is classified a Special Protection Area for the preservation of birds since 1996. The park became one of the first parks of the European network of PAN Parks, created by the WWF to reconcile the protection of nature and tourism.

At the moment of the inauguration of the Swedish park, the Norwegian part of the massif had no formal protection and did not appear in the plan for the creation of national parks of 1992. But this creation raised the question of the establishment of a national park on the Norwegian side, in order to have a more coherent protection of the whole massif. In 27 April 2012, the Fulufjellet National Park was created. Beyond the coherence of protection, one of the principal reasons for the establishment of that park was the presence of brown bears, a species classified as endangered in the country.

== Management and administration ==
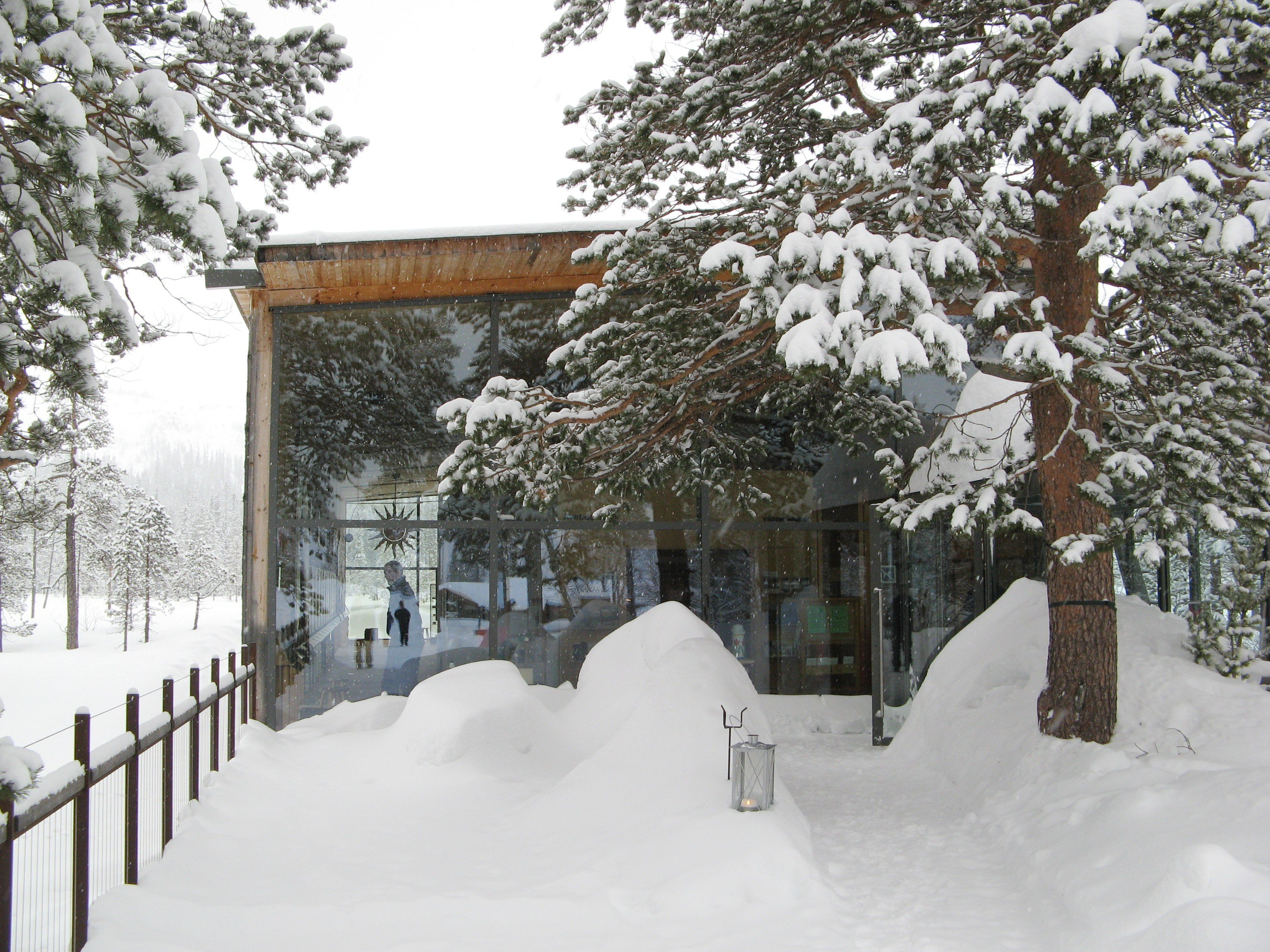
The visitor center of Fulufjället National Park

Like most of the Swedish national parks, the management and administration are divided between the Swedish environmental protection agency and the administrative council of the counties of Sweden (Länsstyrelse). Naturvårdsverket is responsible for proposing new national parks, through consultation with the administrative councils of the counties and municipalities; their creation is approved by the Riksdag (Sweden's parliament). Once approved, the land is then bought by the state, through the intermediary of the Naturvårdsverket. The management of the park is then in the hands of the county, which is to say of the administrative council of Dalarna, in the case of Fulufjället National Park.

The park is divided into four zones, which have different purposes, in order to reconcile the protection of the park and the welcoming of tourists. This is the first Swedish park to adopt this strict kind of zoning. The majority of the park (60%) is in zone 1, that is to say the untouchable zone: this space is the heart of the park and only has a tiny amount of tourism infrastructure. The south-east zone of the park (14%) is in zone 2, the low activity area. In this zone, elk hunting is allowed, but infrastructure is always limited. 25% of the park is in zone 3, the high activity zone. This zone includes most of the tourism infrastructure, such as the trails and the cabins. Fishing is authorized there. Finally, zone 4 (about 1% of the area of the park) corresponds to a radius of about 200 m (660 ft) around the points of strong concentration of visitors, which is to say the entrances, the waterfall of Njupeskär and the valley of Göljån, where the traces of a great flood are still visible.

== Tourism ==
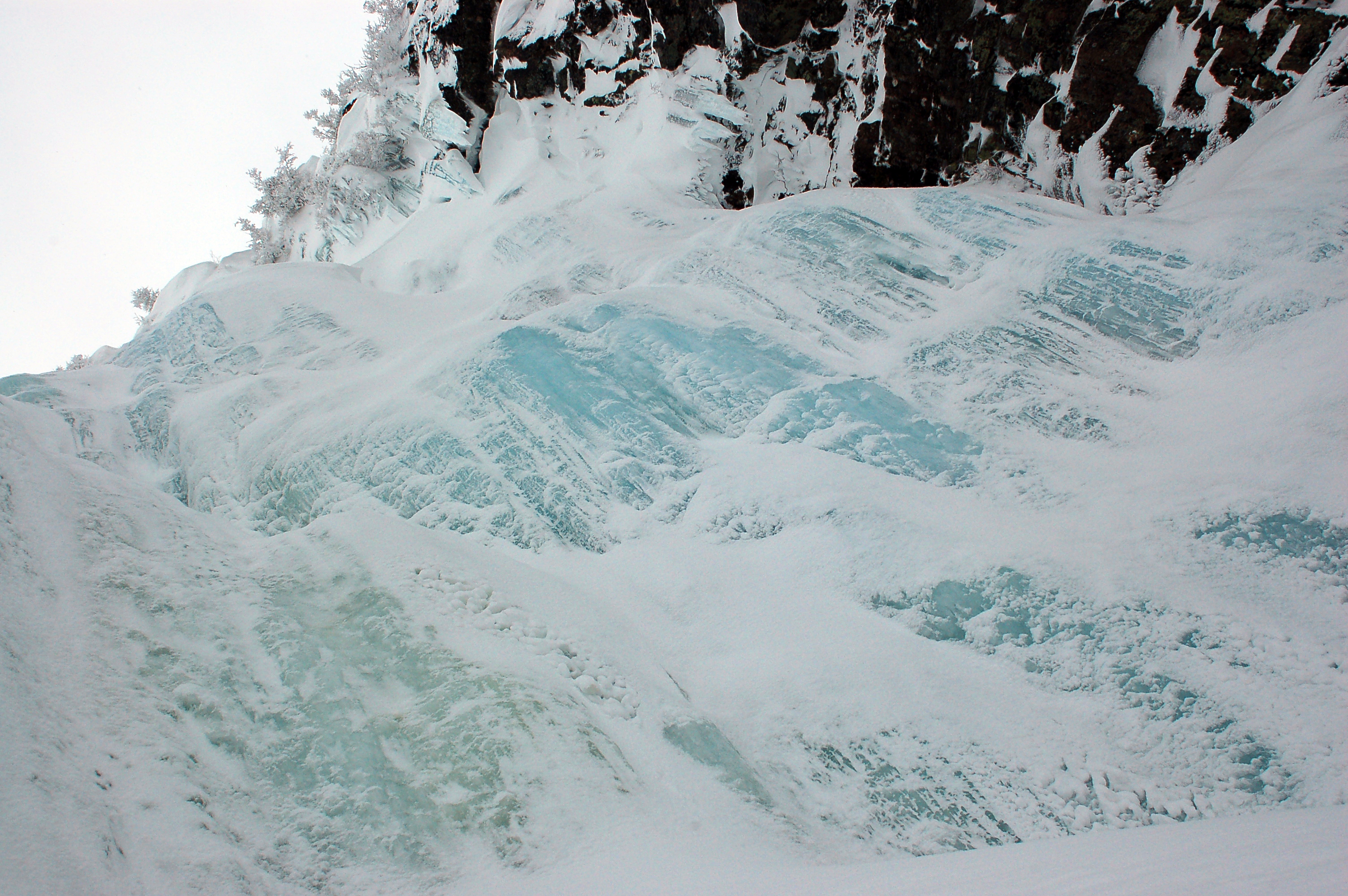
In winter, the waterfall at Njupeskär freezes and becomes a good support for ice climbers

The park is the southernmost of Sweden's mountain parks, and so closest of these parks to the majority of the country's population. It welcomed 53,000 visitors in 2003 (of which 80% arrived in the summer), which is an increase of about 40% compared to 2001, before the creation of the national park. About a third of these visitors are from outside Sweden, mainly from Germany. The main motivation of these visits is waterfall at Njupeskär, the tallest waterfall in Sweden at 93 m (305 ft), 70 m (230 ft) of which are free fall. The damage from a great storm in 1997, still visible not far from the waterfall, is also an important point of interest for the tourists. The park's main entrance, with parking, is situated near these two sites. Near this entrance you can find the park's visitor center, which has exhibits on the nature of the park and is the departure point for guided tours. It is also the starting point of many of the trails of the park, the park having 140 km (87 mi) of hiking trails. Among these trails, one can note a part of the Södra Kungsleden (Sälen-Storlien, totaling 350 km (220 mi)).

The short hike (between 1 and 3 hours) is the most common activity, but a non-negligible proportion of visitors go on longer hikes (several days), which is particularly true of the German visitors. In winter, skiing is possible, but it is however relatively little popular due to the lack of dedicated trails. Ice climbing is also practiced on Njupeskär. Fishing is also allowed, upon the purchase of a permit.

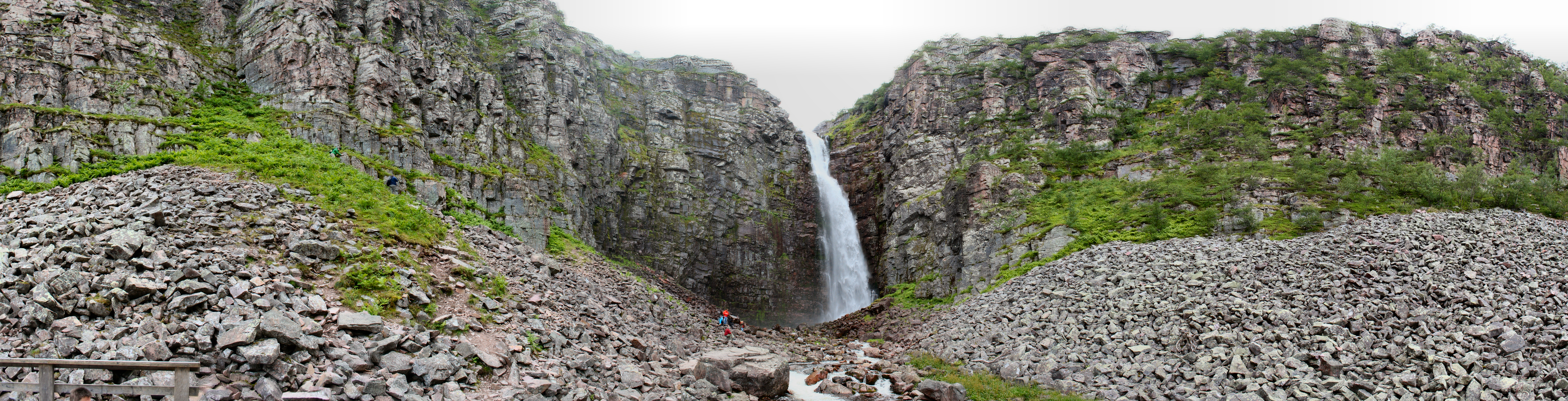
The waterfall at Njupeskär is Fulufjället National Park's main attraction

== Fulufjället in popular culture ==
The children's song Mors lilla Olle by Alice Tegnér is set in the forests of Fulufjället. Its story is inspired by a real event: during the winter of 1850–1851, four children were playing in the forest. One of them, Jon, was just one and a half. They met a bear and its cub. (Note: p. 149) Jon crawled to the bear, who caressed him and fed him berries. When the toddler's mother arrived, she screamed, which made the bears flee. The little boy had thought that the bears were big black dogs.

A KLM Boeing 777-300 is named after Fulufjället National Park.
