= Njupeskär =

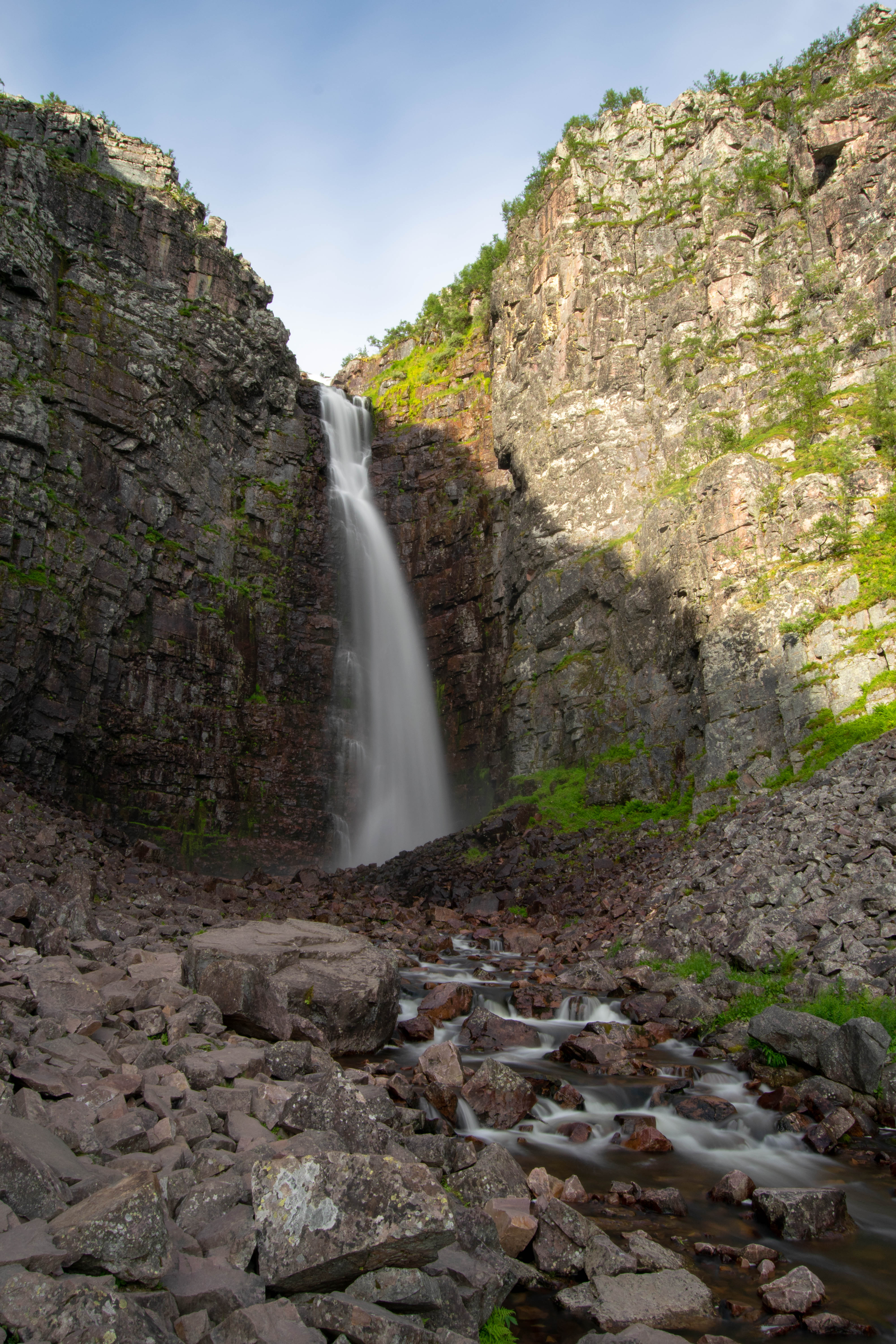
- Interactive map of Njupeskär
- Location: Fulufjället National Park, Dalarna, Sweden
- Coordinates: 61°38′10″N 12°41′18″E
- Total height: about 93 meters
- Watercourse: Njupån

Njupeskär is a waterfall in the river Njupån in Fulufjället National Park, Sweden, about 2 kilometres (1.2 mi) away from the village of Mörkret. With a total height of about 93 metres (305 ft) and a free fall of 70 metres (230 ft), it is the highest free fall in Sweden.

Njupeskär falls over the rim of eroded sandstone plateau of Fulufjället, waterfall has formed an impressive canyon. A few days per year, in early morning around midsummer, the sun shines on the waterfall. Moose and deer can be seen from the hike to the waterfall.

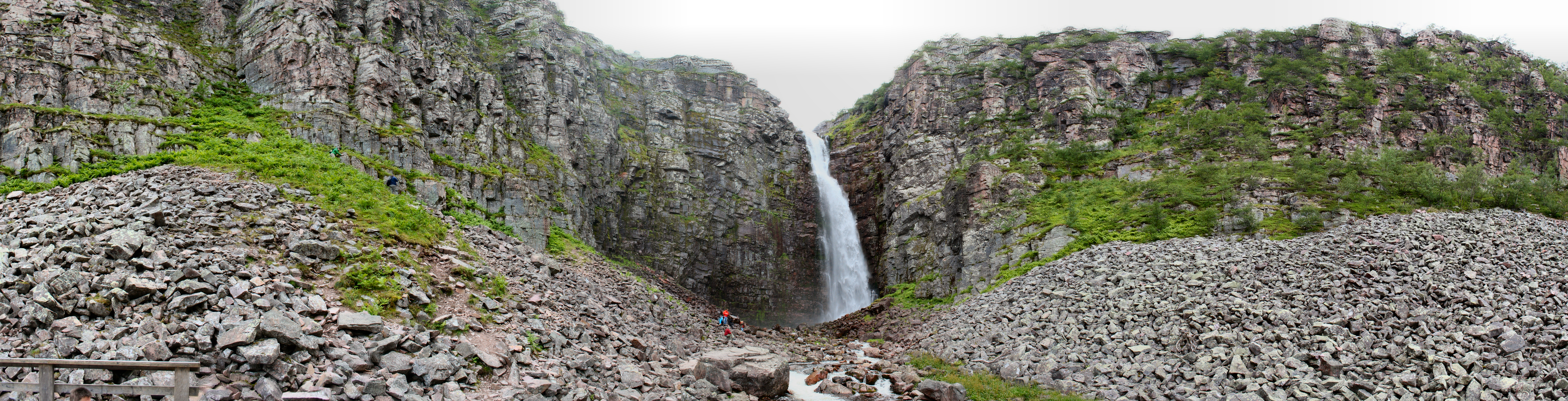
Panoramic view of the Njupeskär waterfall

== See also ==
- List of waterfalls
