= Old Tjikko =

Tree in Dalarna, Sweden

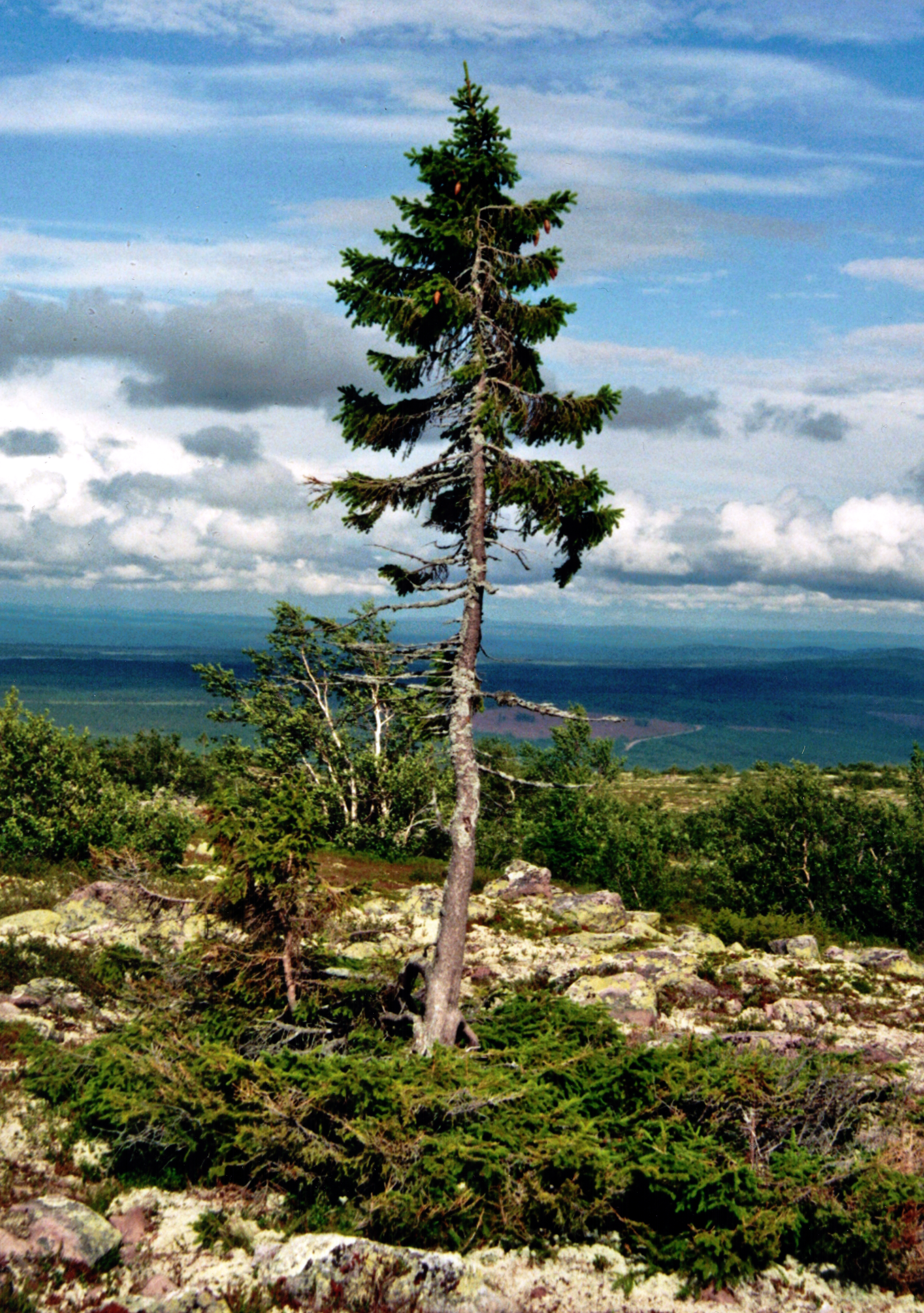
- Old Tjikko
- Location map of Old Tjikko
- Species: Norway spruce (Picea abies)
- Location: Fulufjället mountain, Dalarna, Sweden
- Coordinates: 61°38′22″N 12°40′35″E
- Height: 5 m (16 ft 5 in)
- Date seeded: c. 7550 BC

Old Tjikko (Note: The name is identical in Swedish: there is no Swedish-language version of the name.) is an approximately 9,568-year-old Norway spruce, located in the Dalarna province in Sweden. Old Tjikko originally gained fame as the "world's oldest tree". Old Tjikko is, however, a clonal tree that has regenerated new trunks, branches and roots over millennia rather than an individual tree of great age. Old Tjikko is recognized as the oldest living Picea abies and the fourth-oldest known clonal tree.

The age of the tree was determined by carbon dating of genetically matched plant material collected from under the tree, as dendrochronology does not work for clonal trees. The trunk itself is estimated to be only a few centuries old, but the plant has survived for much longer due to a process known as layering (when a branch comes in contact with the ground, it sprouts a new root), or vegetative cloning (when the trunk dies but the root system is still alive, it may sprout a new trunk).

== Discovery and details ==
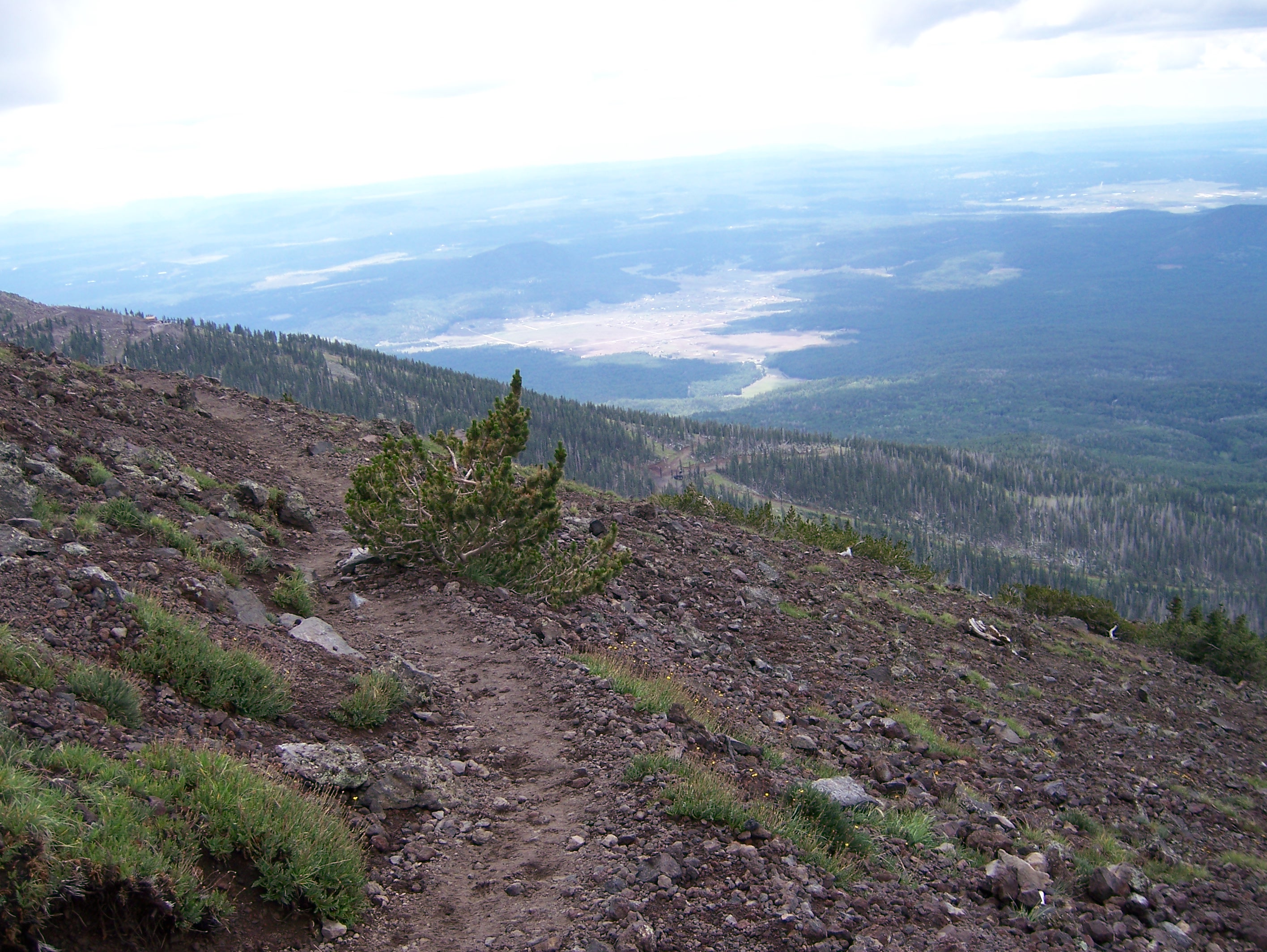
Example of stunted tree exhibiting a krummholz formation

The root system of Old Tjikko is estimated to be 9,568 years old, making it the world's oldest known Norway spruce. It stands 5 metres (16 ft) tall and is located on Fulufjället Mountain of Dalarna province in Sweden. For millennia, the tree appeared in a stunted shrub formation (also known as a krummholz formation) due to the harsh extremes of the environment in which it lives. During the warming of the 20th century, the tree sprouted into a normal tree formation. The husband and wife who discovered the tree, Leif Kullman (professor of physical geography at Umeå University), and Lisa Öberg (tree scientist with a doctorate in biology and ecology from Mid Sweden University) attributed this growth spurt to global warming and named the tree "Old Tjikko", after their late dog.

The tree has survived for so long due to vegetative cloning. The visible tree is relatively young, but it is part of an older root system that dates back millennia. The trunk of the tree may die and regrow multiple times, but the tree's root system remains intact and in turn sprouts another trunk. The trunk may only live for about six hundred years, and when one trunk dies another eventually grows back in its place. Also, each winter, heavy snow may push the tree's low-lying branches to ground level, where they take root and survive to grow again the next year in a process known as layering. Layering occurs when a tree's branch comes in contact with the earth, and new roots sprout from the contact point. Other trees, such as coast redwoods and western red cedars, are known to reproduce by layering. The tree's age was determined by carbon-14 dating of the root system, which found roots dating back to 375, 5,660, 9,000, and 9,550 years before 2008. Carbon dating is not accurate enough to pin down the exact year the tree sprouted from seed; however, given the estimated age, the tree is supposed to have sprouted around 7550 B.C. For comparison, the invention of writing (and thus, the beginning of recorded history) did not occur until around 4000 B.C. Researchers have found a cluster of around twenty spruce trees in the same area, all over eight millennia old.

The estimated age of Old Tjikko is close to the maximum possible for this area, as the last ice age's receding Fenno-Scandian ice sheet only released the Fulufjället Mountain around ten millennia ago.

Nature conservancy authorities considered putting a fence around the tree to protect it from possible vandals or trophy hunters.

On 1 July 2024, it was reported that the Stockholm-based art studio Goldin+Senneby were building a climate-controlled installation at a new hospital campus in Malmö, Sweden. The installation houses a clone of Old Tjikko and was created using small twigs cut from Old Tjikko's top branches, which were then grafted onto stems of other spruce trees. This process would thus result in saplings with DNA identical to that of Old Tjikko.

== See also ==
- List of oldest trees
- List of individual trees
- List of superlative trees in Sweden
