= Ekeby oak tree =

500-year-old tree near Stockholm, Sweden

Coordinates: 59.27996965°N 17.8203632°E

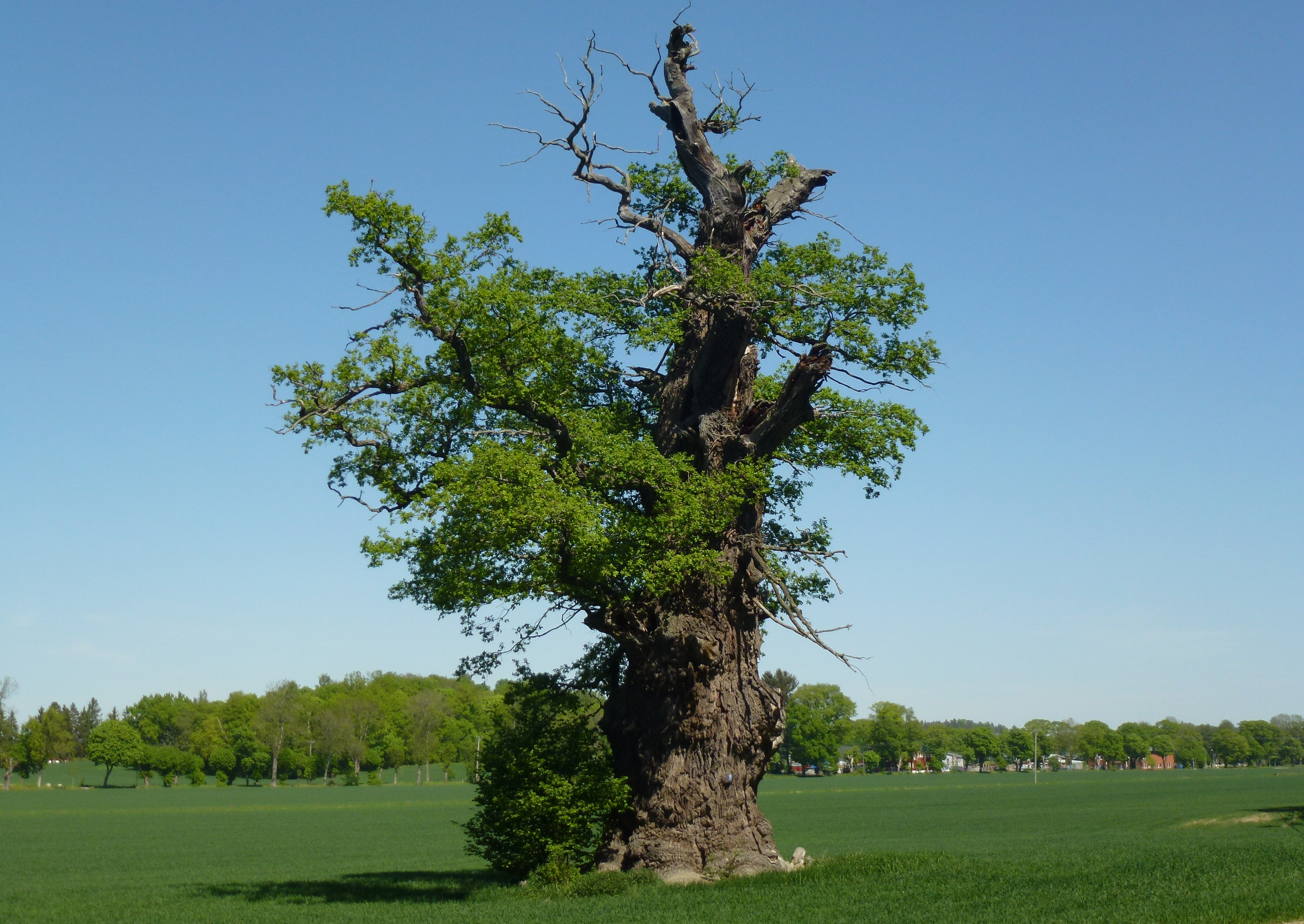
Ekeby oak tree in May 2012

The Ekeby oak tree (Swedish: Ekebyhovseken) is an oak tree in Ekerö outside Stockholm, Sweden, close to Ekebyhov Castle. It is the largest living deciduous tree in Sweden by volume.

The Ekeby oak is approximately 500 years old. It was declared a natural monument in 1956. There are many old trees around Ekebyhov Castle, but this oak, sometimes called Ekeröjätten (the Ekerö giant) stands alone in a field south of the castle, where it had no competition for space from other trees. It was measured in 2008 as the largest tree by volume in Sweden.

== See also ==
- List of individual trees
- List of superlative trees in Sweden
