= Rumskulla oak =

Oak tree in Kalmar County, Sweden

Coordinates: 57°44′5″N 15°37′44″E

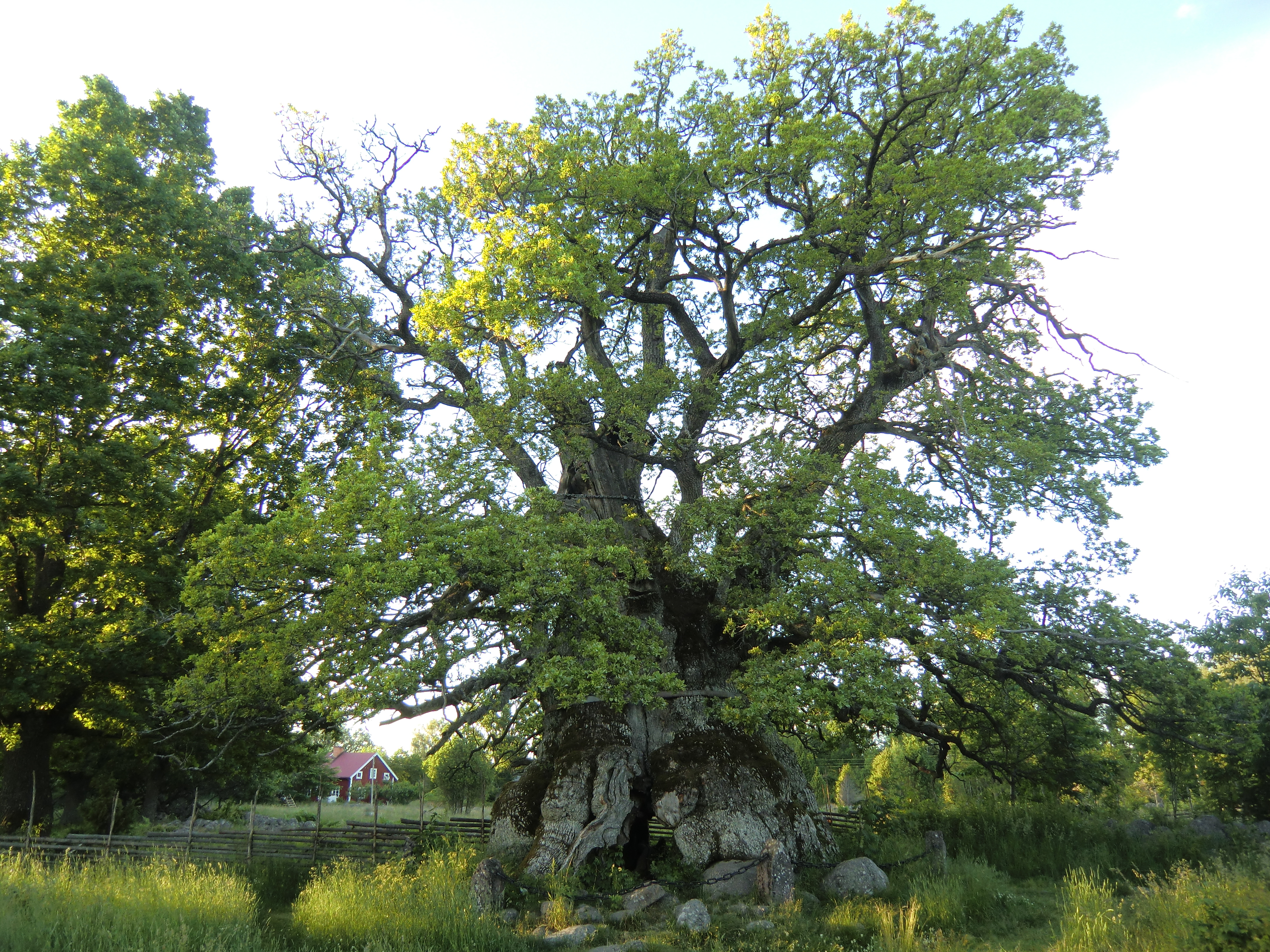
Rumskulla oak, 2010

The Rumskulla oak, also known as the Kvill oak, is an oak tree (Quercus robur) near Norra Kvill National Park in Rumskulla socken, Vimmerby, Kalmar County, Småland, Sweden. It is the oldest oak in Sweden and one of the largest trees in Scandinavia, and was first described in 1772.

== History ==
The tree is more than 1,000 years old and was first described by Magnus Gabriel Craelius in 1772 in Försök till ett landskaps beskrivning ("Attempting a description of a landscape"). It is 14 metres (46 ft) high, with a trunk approximately 13 metres (43 ft) in circumference and a volume of approximately 60 cubic metres (78 cu yd), making it one of the largest trees in Sweden. According to Eksjö Municipality, it is the oldest tree in Scandinavia and the largest in circumference.

There was an iron band around the trunk to support it, thought to have been put there in the 19th century. It was partially replaced after being cut in 2005 by someone who said he wanted to "free" the tree. In 2013, new interventions, such as wire supports, were installed. A chain a little higher up prevents the trunk from splitting; the tree is now completely hollow. Climbing has been forbidden since 1998 and there is a fence around the tree; going closer than 5 metres (16 ft) is not permitted.

The steel band was replaced with wires in 2012. In 2018, it was reported that the oak had been "stressed" by the band that had been installed after the sabotage in 2005, and that the tree had been affected by the oak borer moth caterpillar and fungal attack (powdery mildew). In 2025, one of the branches of the dying oak still had leaves.

The hollow trunk of the tree was the location for sex scenes in I Am Curious (Yellow), a 1967 film by Vilgot Sjöman. The film was controversial when first released, including being banned in Massachusetts; in a case that went all the way to the Supreme Court of the United States, it was ultimately determined not to be obscene.

== Nature reserve ==
The Rumskulla oak is registered as a national natural object of interest with the Swedish National Heritage Board and in 2008, the Kvill Nature Reserve (Swedish: Kvills naturreservat) was created around it as the first nature reserve in the municipality. The 29.4-hectare (73-acre) preserve was created to preserve a traditionally open landscape with large oaks and other deciduous trees which contrasts with the nearby pine woods. It is adjacent to Norra Kvill National Park. The tree is accessible for disabled people.

== Close-up views of trunk ==
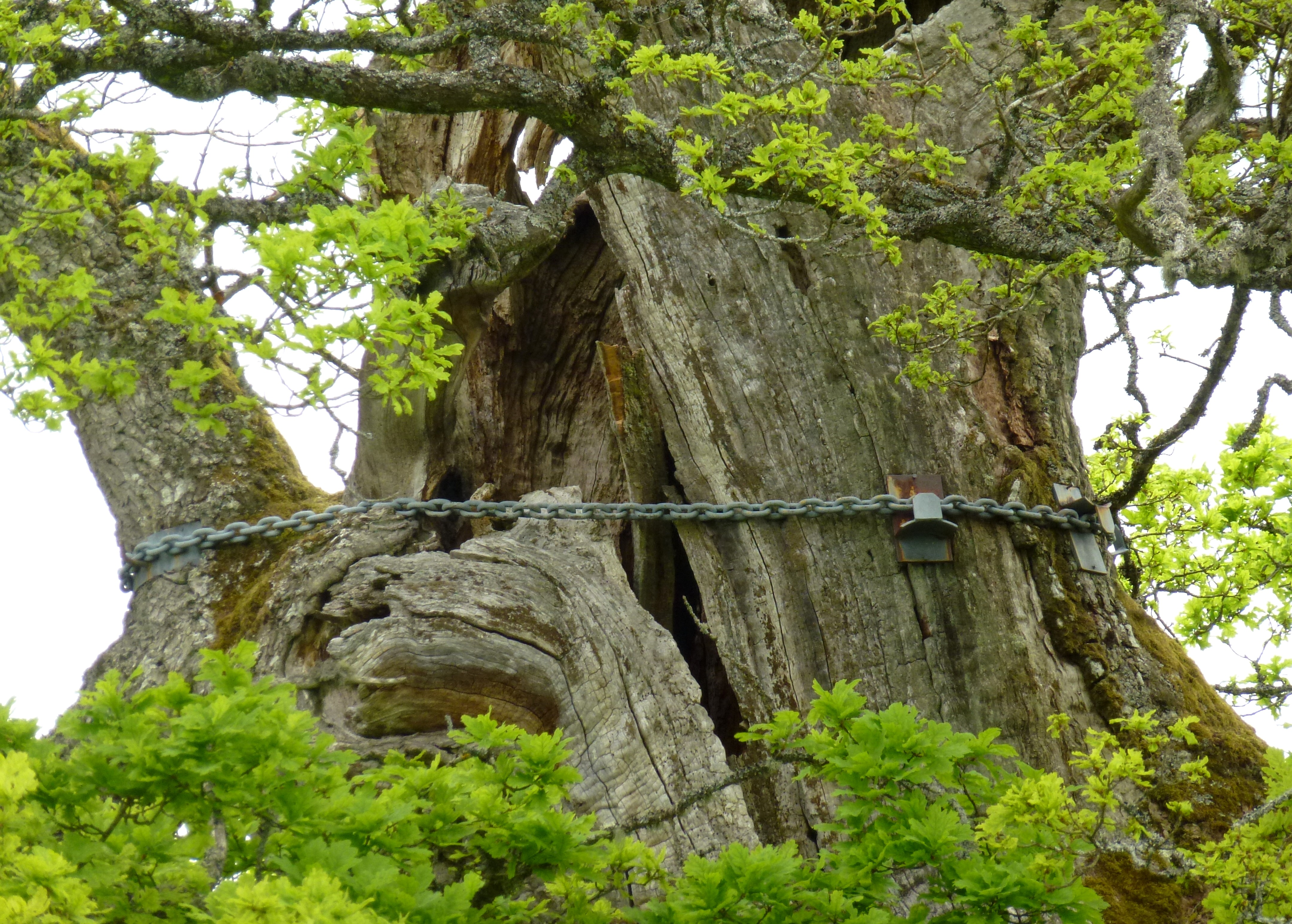

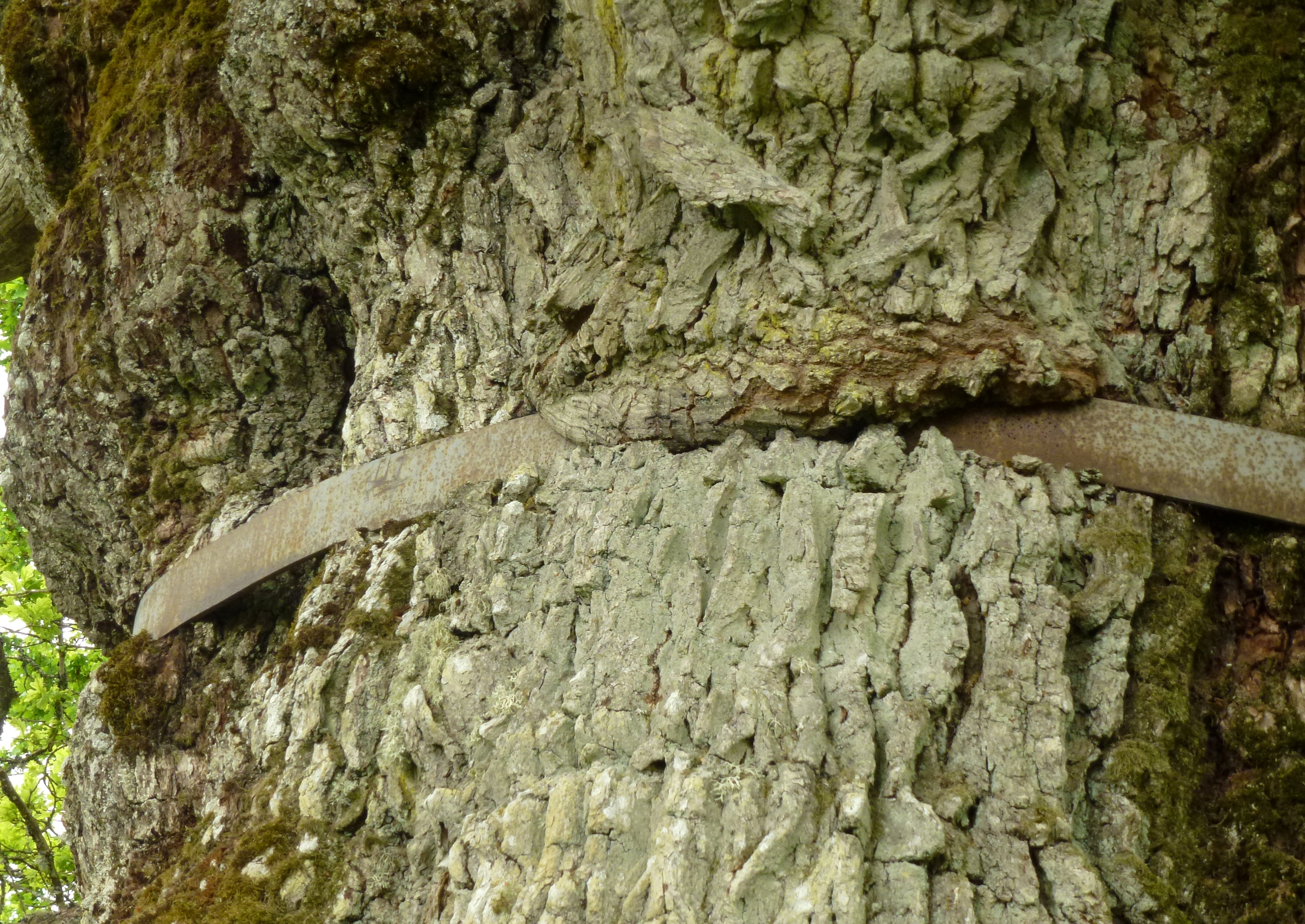

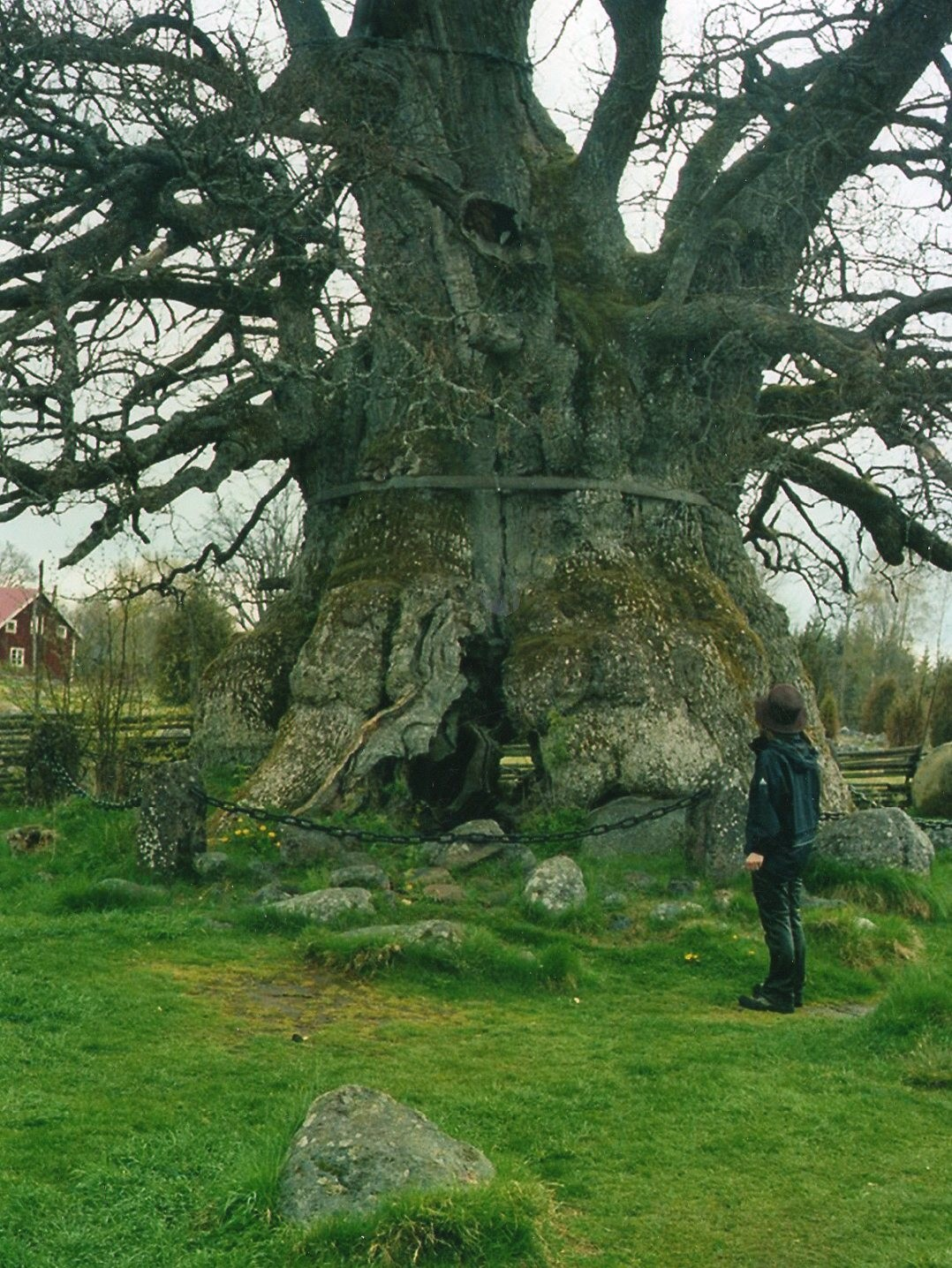

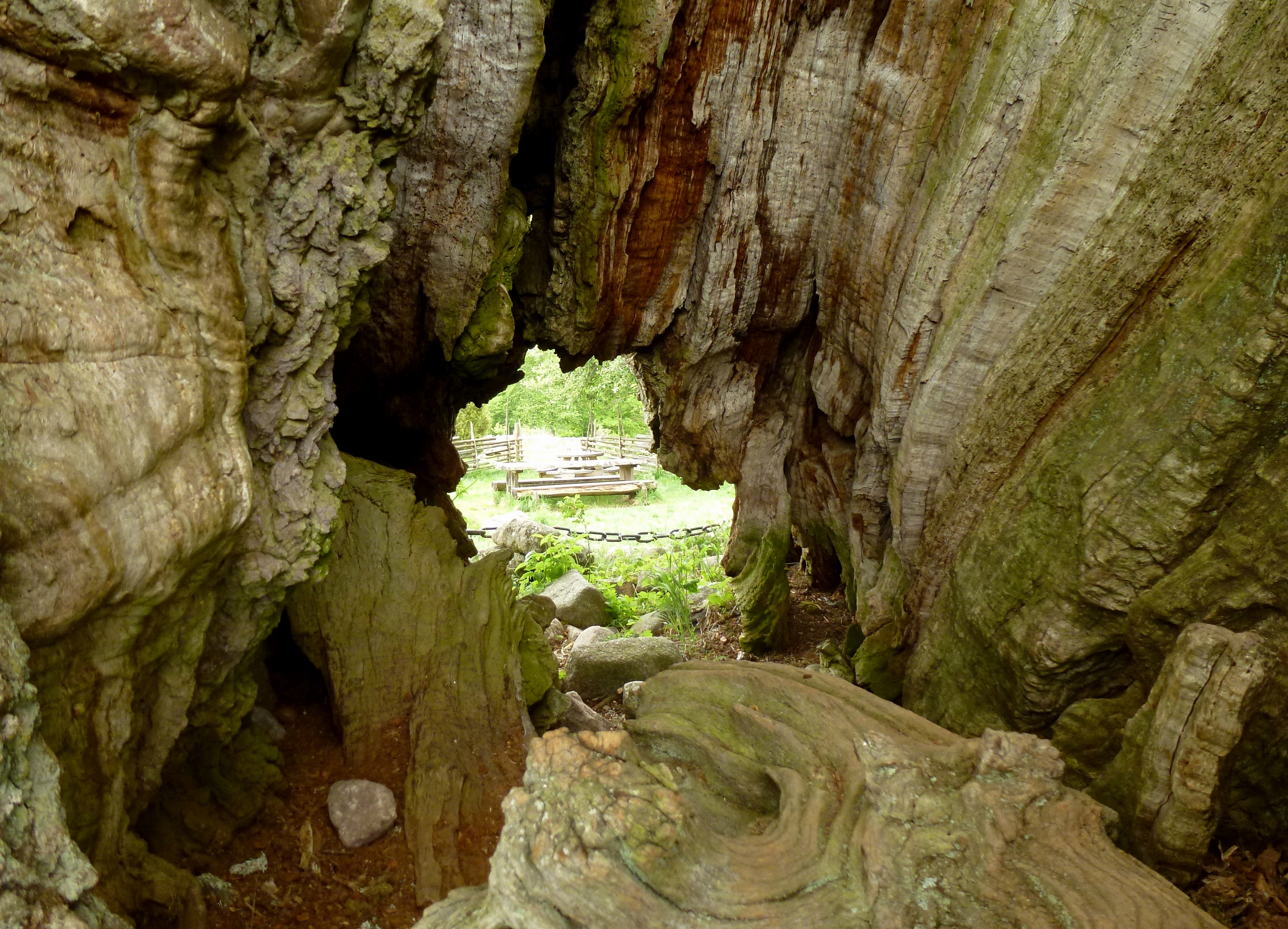

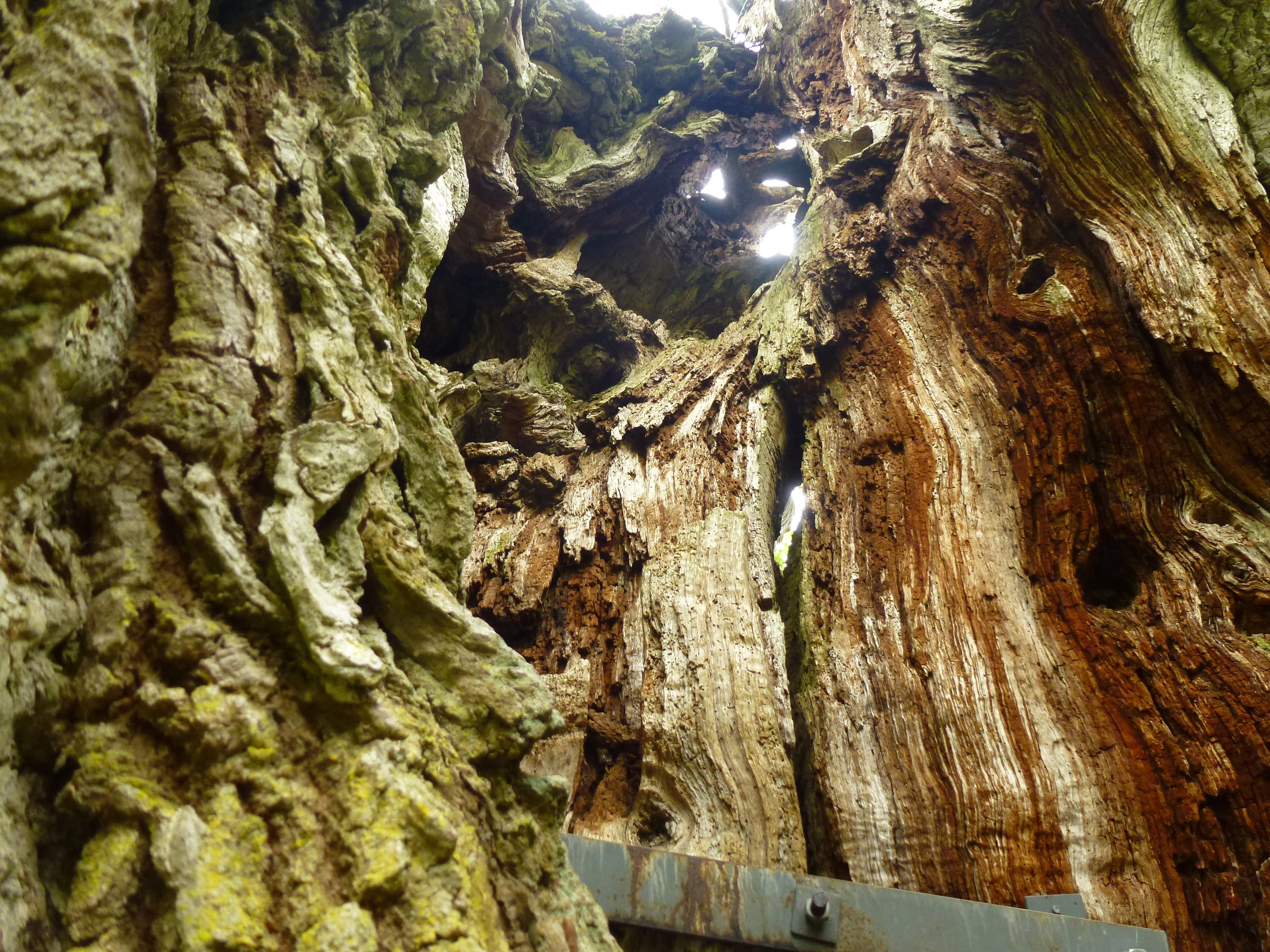

== See also ==
- List of individual trees
- Angel Oak
- Major Oak
- Liernu Oak
- Royal Oak
- List of superlative trees in Sweden
- Tree That Owns Itself
