= Ekerö =

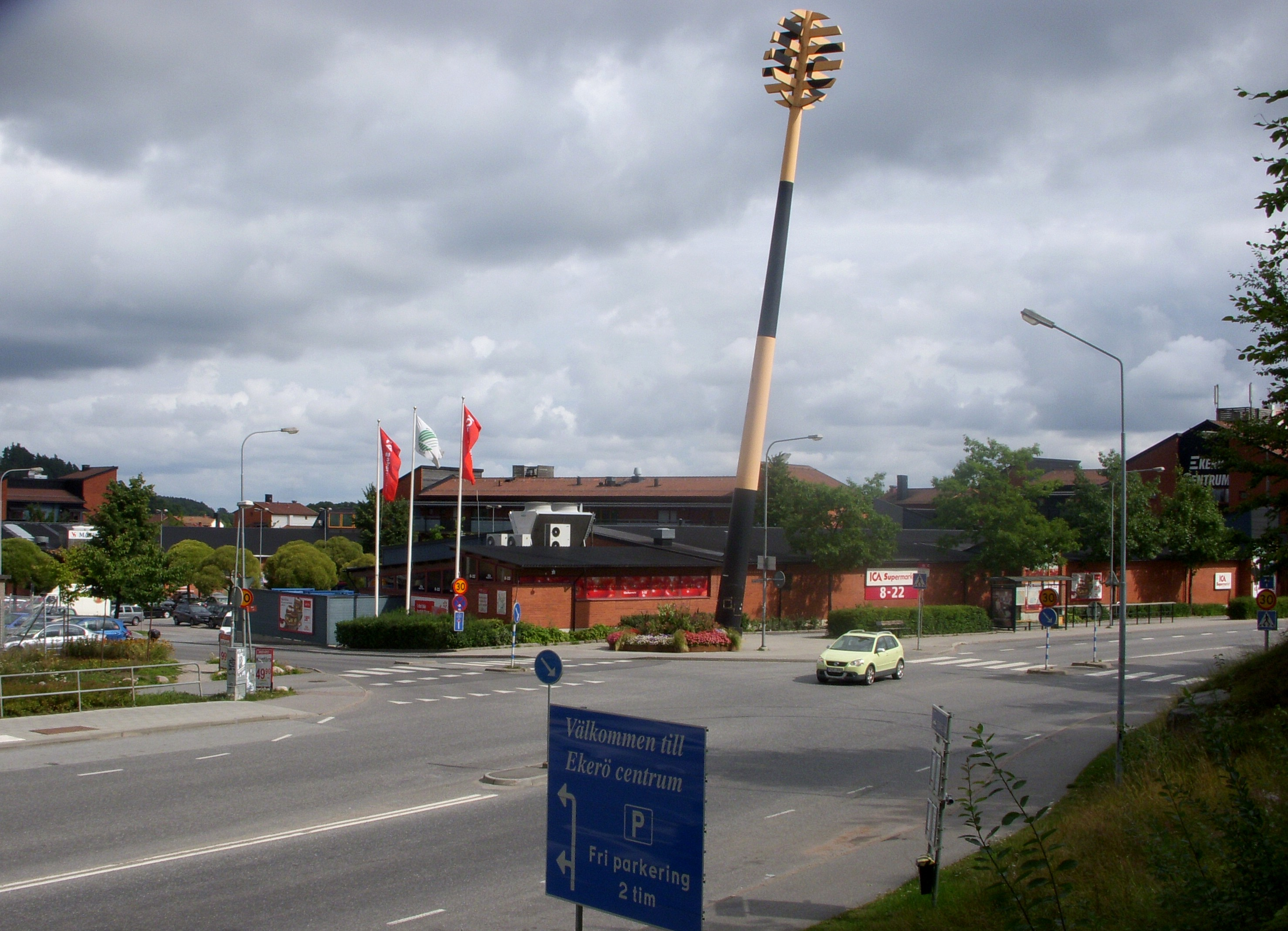
- Central Ekerö

- Location within Stockholm Location within Sweden Location within European Union
- Coordinates: 59°17′N 17°48′E
- Country: Sweden
- Province: Uppland
- County: Stockholm County
- Municipality: Ekerö Municipality

Area
  - Total: 5.42 km^{2} (2.09 sq mi)

Population (31 December 2023)
  - Total: 28 808
  - Density: 5.2/km^{2} (13/sq mi)
- Time zone: UTC+1 (CET)
  - Summer (DST): UTC+2 (CEST)

Ekerö is a locality (urban area) and the seat of Ekerö Municipality in Stockholm County, Sweden, with 11,524 inhabitants in 2017. It is also an alternative name of the island Ekerön, on which the Ekerö urban area is situated.

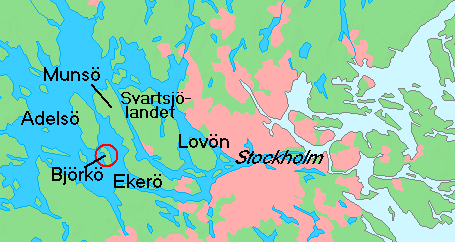
Map showing Ekerö in relation to Stockholm

== Sports ==
The following sports clubs are located in Ekerö:

- Ekerö IK
- Skå IK
- Mälaröarnas Ridklubb MäRK
- Ekerö TK

== Notable people ==
- Carolina Gynning, glamour model
- Ewa Björling, politician
- Lykke Li, singer
- Bo Ljungfeldt, racing driver
- Agnetha Fältskog, singer, musician

== See also ==
- Ekeby oak tree
