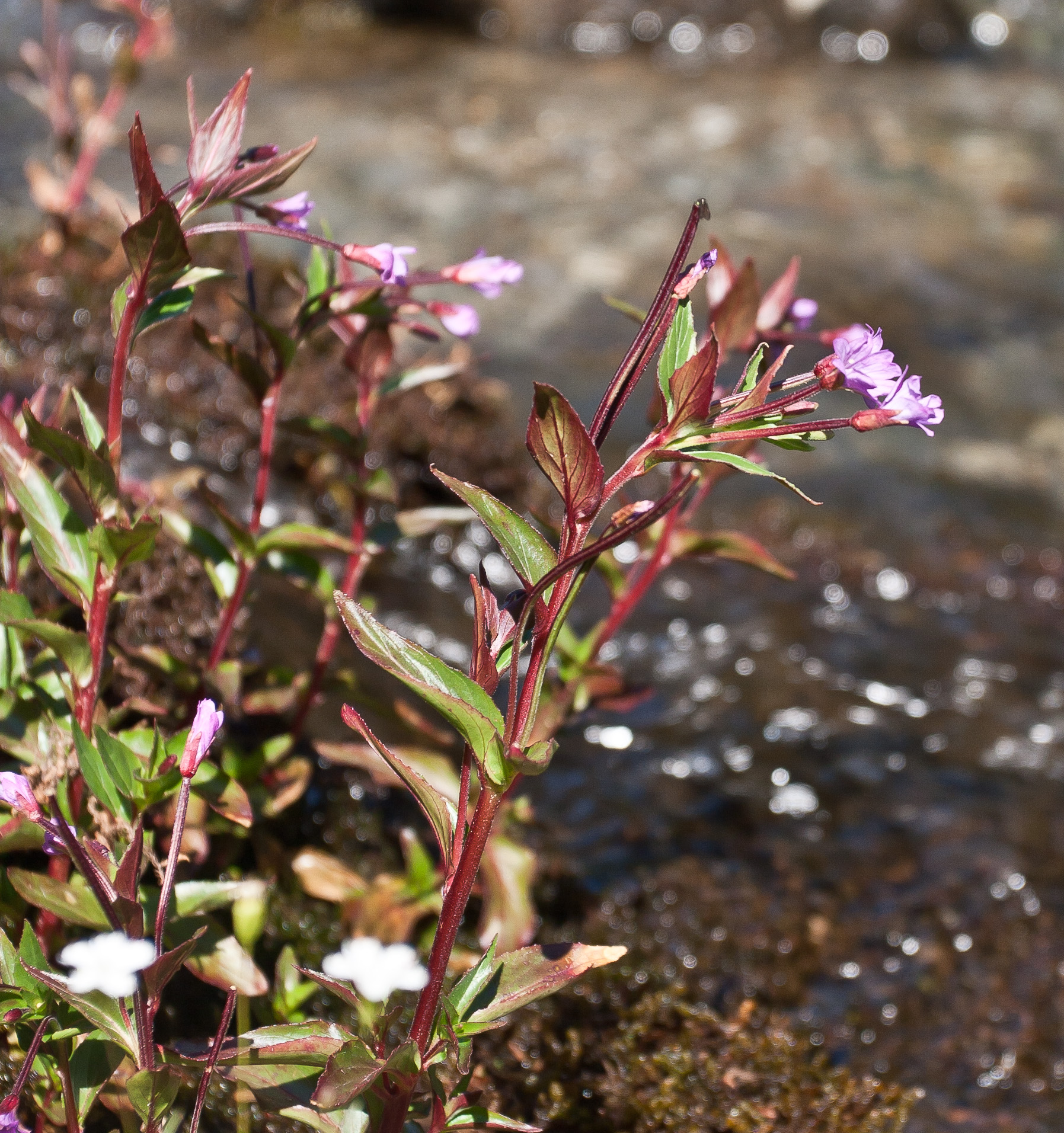
- Epilobium alsinifolium near Obervellach in southern Austria

Scientific classification
- Kingdom: Plantae
- Clade: Tracheophytes
- Clade: Angiosperms
- Clade: Eudicots
- Clade: Rosids
- Order: Myrtales
- Family: Onagraceae
- Genus: Epilobium
- Species: E. alsinifolium

Binomial name
- Epilobium alsinifolium Lam.

= Epilobium alsinifolium =

Species of flowering plant in the willowherb family

Epilobium alsinifolium is a species of willowherb known by the common name chickweed willowherb. This small flowering plant can be found in European arctic regions and further south in mountainous regions with an Arctic climate, as well as in Greenland. It is a perennial found in low clumps approximately 10 to 25 centimeters (4 to 10 in) in height. It has wide, rounded basal leaves and narrower leaves further up the stem. It bears purple or pinkish trumpet-shaped flowers, 7 to 12 millimeters in diameter, and the fruit is a capsule two or three centimeters long.

== Bibliography ==
- Strgulc Krajšek, Sumona; Šegedin, Tamara; Jogan, Nejc (2009-06-30). "Revision of Epilobium and Chamerion in the Croatian herbaria ZA and ZAHO". Natura Croatica. 18 (1): 155–167. eISSN 1848-7386.
