= Twined knitting =

Knitting technique

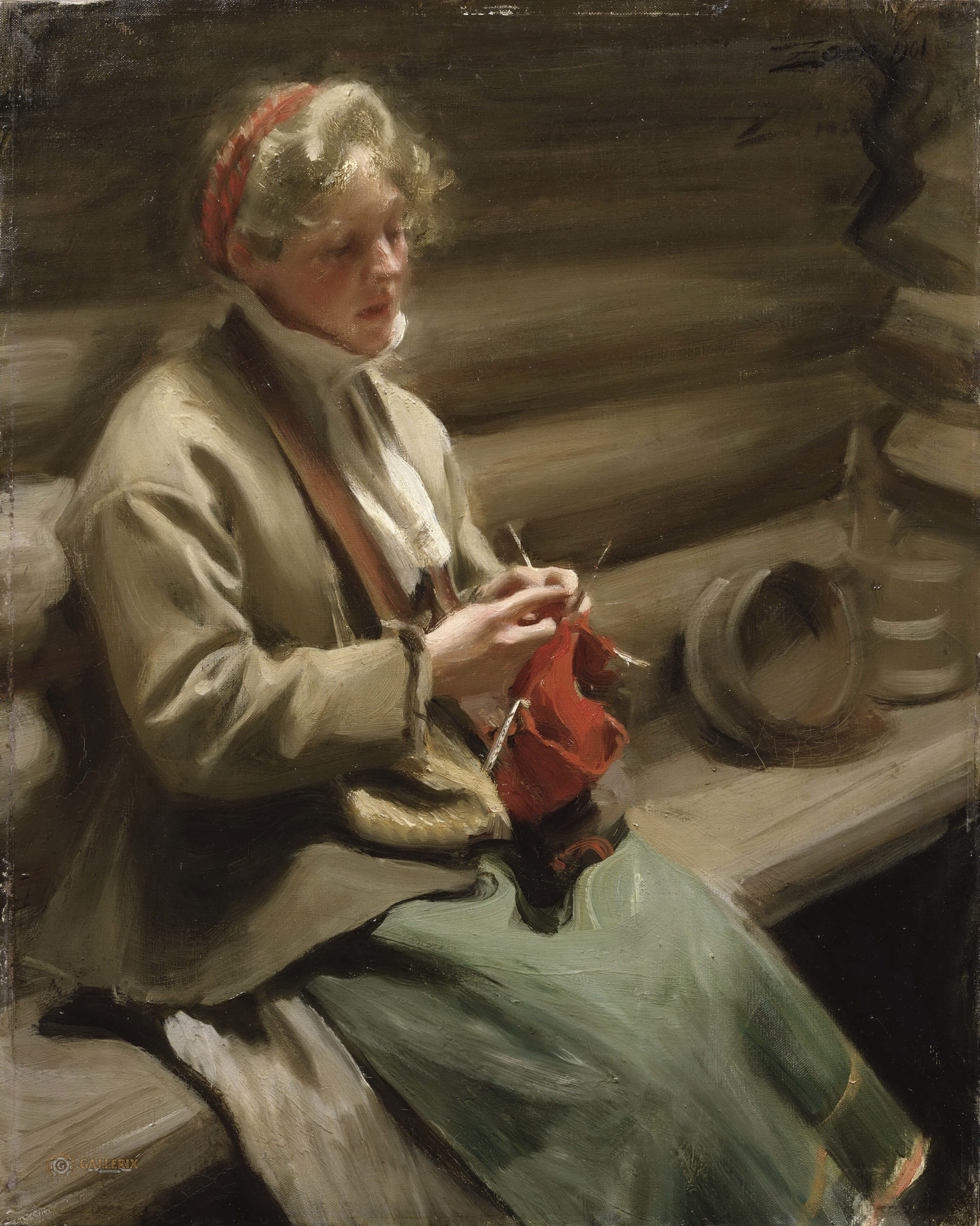
Girl from Dalecarlia knitting. Cabbage Margit (Stickande kulla. Kål-Margit) by Anders Zorn (1901) portraits a woman from Dalarna knitting in this technique.

Twined knitting (also known as two-end knitting) is a traditional Scandinavian knitting technique. It refers to knitting where two strands of yarn are knitted into the fabric alternatively and twisted once and always in the same direction before every stitch. The technique is called tvåändsstickning in Swedish, tvebandsstrikking in Norwegian, and tvebinding in Danish. Their literal meaning is "two-end knitting", referring to the traditional way of knitting with both yarn ends from one ball of yarn.

While the right-side of the fabric resembles a one-end stocking-stitch fabric (as seen from the right side), the wrong-side of the fabric has a horizontally ridged surface due to the plaits created by the twisting of the two strands of yarn. Intricate relief patterns are characteristic of the technique.

Twined knitting produces a firmer and more durable fabric with greater thermal insulation than conventional one-end knitting. The technique has historically been used to knit mittens, gloves, socks, stockings, caps and sleeves for waistcoats.

== Historical and cultural overview ==
The technique is predominantly associated with the forestry areas of Värmland, Dalarna, Härjedalen, Jämtland and Hälsingland in Sweden, and Hedmark, Oppland, Akershus and Buskerud in Norway. Archaeological finds from these areas provide evidence that the technique has been practiced since the sixteenth century. Practical knowledge of the technique still persists in these areas. Danish archaeological findings of the technique have been dated to the seventeenth century. However, practical knowledge of the technique has ceased to exist in Denmark. Evidence of the technique has not yet been found in the remaining Nordic countries.

=== Sweden ===
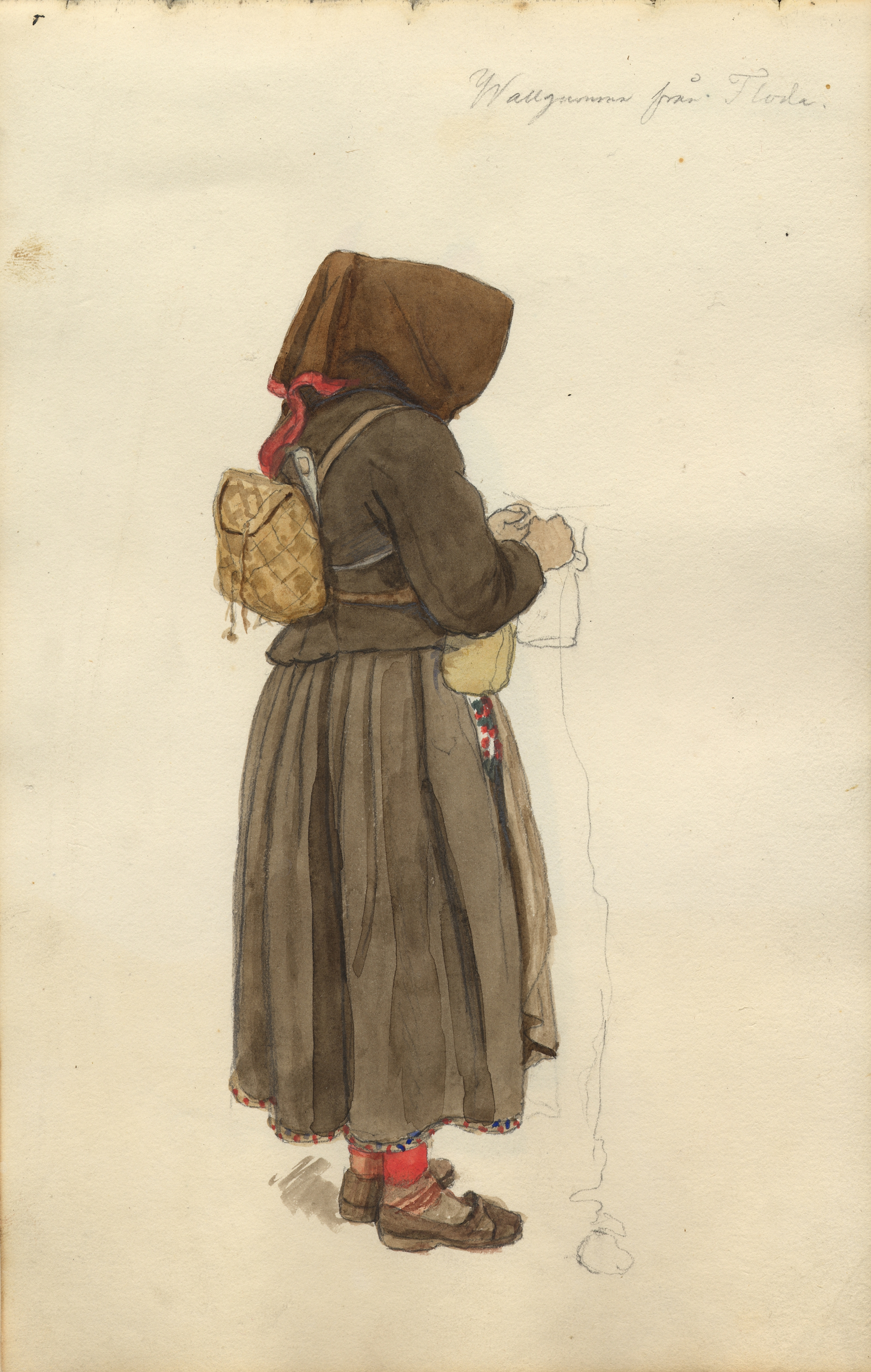
Aquarelle by A. J. G. Virgin called Wallgumma från Floda portraying a woman from Floda knitting, possibly in this technique.

The technique is historically significant to the Swedish county Dalarna. Two-end knitted garments continue to be included in several of Dalarnas traditional local costumes. The history of knitting in this region can be traced back to the mid-seventeenth century. Wool yarn was the most common knitting material, but linen and cotton yarn was sometimes used to knit socks, mittens and gloves.

Mittens and gloves were commonly twine-knitted in white (typically for women) or black (typically for men) wool yarn with a knitted or embroidered colourful pattern. Embroidered twine-knitted mittens with a fringe trimming are particularly associated with Dala-Floda were they are included in the traditional local costume. However, embroidered mittens with or without fringe trimmings are common in other parts of Dalarna as well as in Värmland and Härjedalen. Some two-end knitted mittens were intended to be worn inside unlined leather mittens, in which cases they were known as handskvantar, bälgvantar or körhandskar.

On the island of Sollerön in Siljan, half-mittens and gloves were two-end knitted in white linen or cotton yarn for weddings, half-mittens being worn by the bride and gloves by the groom. The gloves and half-mittens were later reused by the couple on ceremonial occasions. The garments from Sollerön are characterised by their elaborate relief patterns. In Lima, twine-knitted cotton gloves were produced and exported during the nineteenth century.

Socks and stockings were typically two-end knitted in an undyed wool, linen or cotton yarn, often to be dyed after. During dyeing, the parts that would not show when the sock was worn, usually the foot, heel and top edge, were turned in and stitched to save dye. In order to protect the heel from wear, the heel was commonly covered with a piece of wadmal, leather or a scrap of knitted fabric.

Two-end knitted caps from Bjursås have a black brim and a red main body with stripes typically in black, red and green. Contrasting stitches in white cotton yarn appear across the cap, white cotton yarn appearing whiter than white wool yarn.

Sleeves were typically two-end knitted in white wool yarn with a pattern of stars, crosses, flowers and geometrical figures in black wool yarn. The sleeves were thereafter dyed red and sewn to a waistcoat in wadmal, broadcloth, or a printed woven fabric. In the local folk costume of Gagnef, the waistcoat is occasionally decorated with machine stitches. Traditional jackets and sweaters from Hälsingland include two-end knitted parts, typically their cuffs and the lower part of the body. Occasionally, they were entirely two-end knitted.

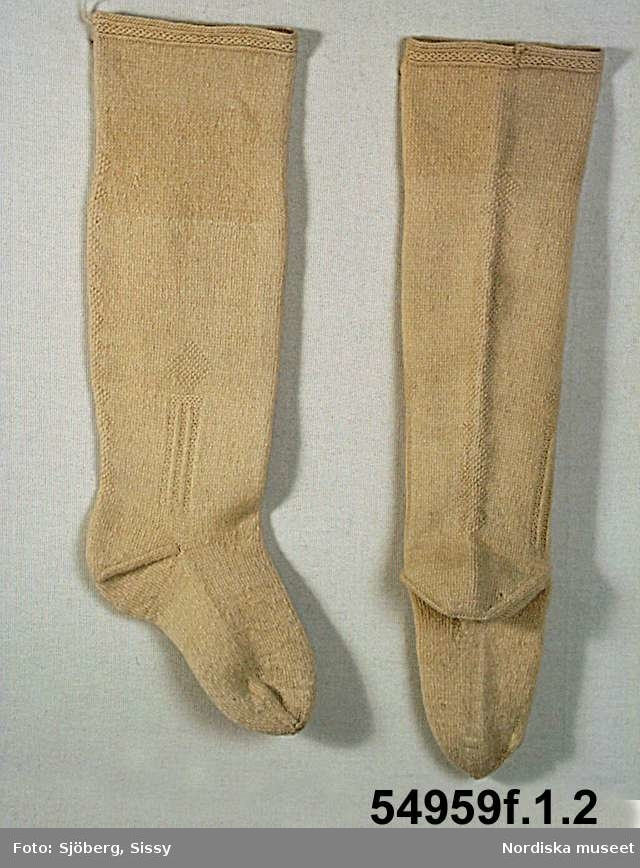
A pair of two-end knitted stockings part of the traditional female costume from Orsa.

Research has shown that more than 95 percent of the knitted objects collected from Dalarna and its surrounding areas that are kept at the Nordic Museum in Stockholm and in local museum collections in Dalarna, are knitted using this technique. No similar research has been made into the knitted objects from Värmland, Härjedalen, Jämtland and Hälsingland, but it is assumed that older knitted objects are likely to be partly or entirely two-end knitted.

=== Norway ===
Norwegian museum collection include primarily two-end knitted mittens, mostly in grey wool yarn knitted in stocking-stitch. These mittens have been worn with the inside out, exposing the horizontally ridged surface. Strands of yarn have been sewn to the inside to create a piled surface, increasing the mittens thermal insulation. In Värmland, two-end knitted mittens have also been worn with the inside out.

=== Modern times ===
Towards the end of the nineteenth century, the Continental style of knitting (also called left-hand knitting or picking) was introduced to the Swedish school system. As a result, twined knitting was to a significant extent abandoned in favour of conventional one-end knitting.

A twine-knitted glove, now known as Bornvanten, was found in an archeological excavation of Gamla Herrgården in Falun in 1974. The glove was found close to where Borns hyttegård once was located, thereof its name. The glove is 24 cm long and 11 cm wide. It is knitted in a fine wool yarn, about 5.5 stitches per cm, and has a fringe trimming. Radiocarbon dating dates the burial of the glove to 1490–1645. This makes it one of the oldest knitted objects in Sweden and the oldest two-end knitted object. Bornvanten initiated extensive research into the cultural history of twined knitting and a revived interest in the technique.

Traditionally, practical knowledge of twined knitting has been passed down from generation to generation. At present, courses in twined knitting are an important method to teach the technique. Social media such as YouTube has become a way of transferring practical knowledge of the technique. Currently, there is a growing interested in twined knitting. Several books in multiple languages have been published on the subject and knitting patterns are available on Ravelry.

== Technique ==
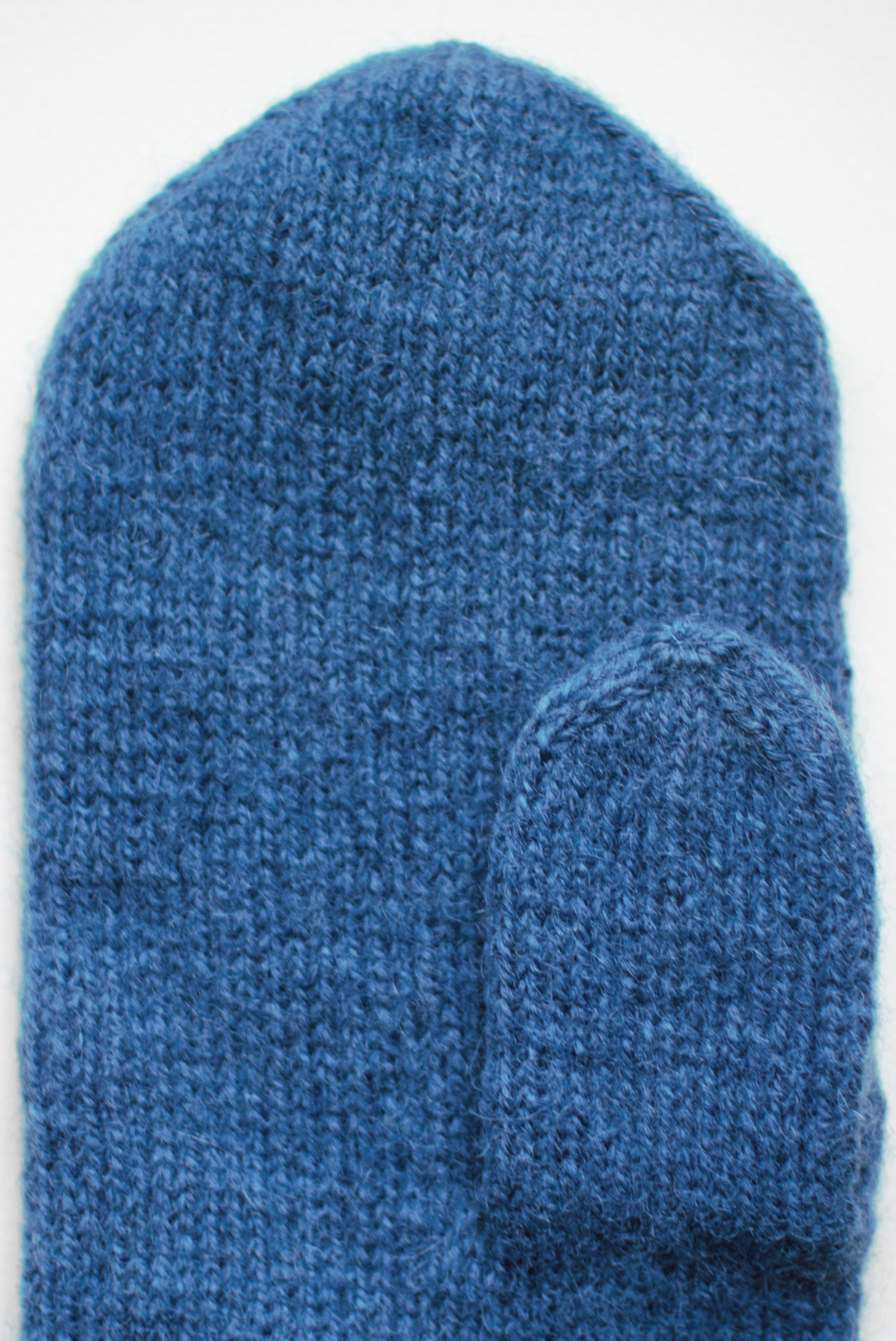
The right side of a two-end knitted mitten knitted in Z-twisted yarn.

=== Material ===
The twist and ply direction of the yarn influences the properties of the knitted fabric. S-twisted and Z-plied yarns become excessively twisted when knitting in this technique, complicating the untwisting of the two strands of yarn. The excessive twist can cause the right side of the fabric to develop a horizontally ridged surface. Z-twisted and S-plied yarns will instead untwist when knitting in this technique. This creates a smooth knitted surface that resembles a one-end stocking-stitch fabric (as seen from the right side). Preferably, Z-twisted yarns should have a firm close twist to avoid the yarn from untwisting completely. Most suited are high Z-twisted and low S-plied yarns.

The technique always refers to knitting with two strands of yarn, even when knitting a monochrome fabric. The strands of yarn can come from one or two balls of yarn. As the two strands of yarn are always twisted in the same direction, a cord will form while knitting that must be untwisted at regular intervals. Letting both strands of yarn come from one ball of yarn will relieve the untwisting of the two strands of yarn. If both yarn ends are to come from one ball of yarn, the ball of yarn needs to be a centre pull ball where both ends are accessible. A nostepinne, a mechanical ball winder or something equivalent will provide such a ball of yarn. By making one or two half hitches with the two strands of yarn around the ball of yarn, the strands of yarn can be untwisted by letting the ball of yarn hang by its own weight.

=== Method ===
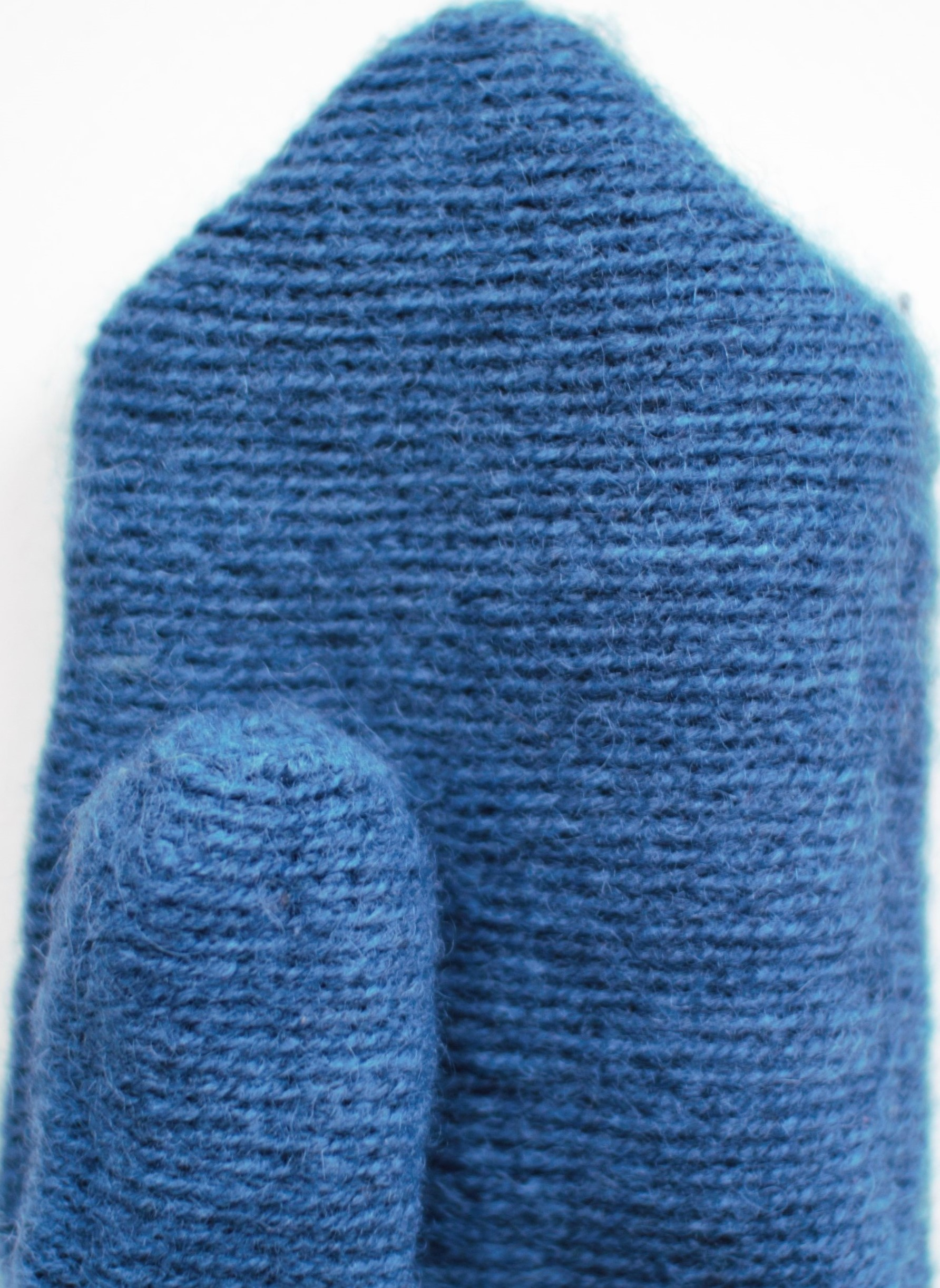
The wrong side of a two-end knitted mitten knitted in Z-twisted yarn.

The technique is typically knitted with fine yarn and thin knitting needles to create a firm and dense fabric. A rule of thumb is to use knitting needles that are 0.5 mm smaller in diameter than the recommended needle size of the yarn. Metal knitting needles are preferred. Traditionally, twine knitting is performed in the round with five double-pointed needles.

Casting on is performed with the two strands of yarn and one additional strand of yarn. There are three common casting on methods. When knitting mittens, gloves, socks and stockings, the strands of yarn left from casting on are typically braided as a decorative detail.

The English style of knitting (also called right-hand knitting or throwing) is applied, i.e. both yarns are carried in the right hand.

To knit, both strands of yarn are held in back and carried in the knitter's right hand, the strands of yarn being separated by the index and the middle finger. The right needle is inserted into the next stitch on the left needle through the front loop as if to knit, knitting with the back strand of yarn that is brought over the front strand of yarn with the index finger.

To purl, both strands of yarn are held in front and carried in the knitter's right hand, the strands of yarn being separated by the index and the middle finger. The right needle is inserted into the next stitch on the left needle through the back loop as if to purl, knitting with the back strand of yarn that is brought under the front strand of yarn with the index finger.

The technique is characteristic of its relief patterns. These are formed by knitting purled stitches, deep stitches (Swedish: djupmaskor) and crook stitches (Swedish: krokmaskor).

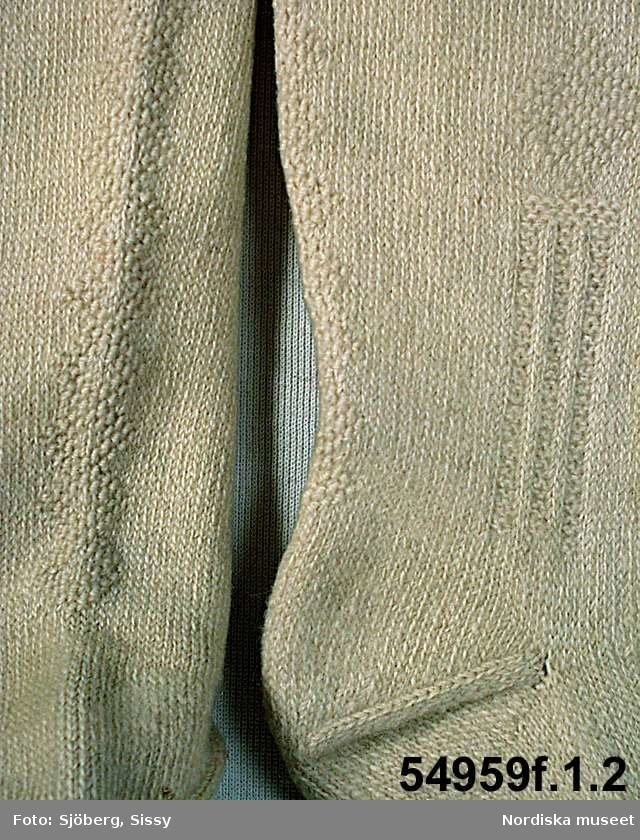
Detail photo of a pair of two-end knitted stockings part of the traditional female costume from Orsa, showing the relief pattern characteristic of twined knitting.

A deep stitch is created by letting the front strand of yarn run in front while knitting one stitch with the back strand of yarn. If consecutive deep stitches are to be created, the strands of yarn must swap places before knitting the next stitch.

A crook stitch involves an odd number of stitches (1 purl, 1 knit, 1 purl). It is created by letting the strand of yarn used to purl the first stitch run in front while knitting the next stitch. A row of crook stitches is called a crook row (Swedish: krokvarv). Knitting two subsequent crook rows, shifting the rows by one stitch, produces a chain path (Swedish: kedjegång). An "O" stitch is produced by knitting a crook stitch on the first row and an inverted crook stitch on top on the following row (1 knit, 1 purl, 1 knit, letting the strand of yarn that is not used to knit run in front).

A purled deep stitch involves purling a stitch with both strands of yarn. Purled deep stitches can develop a structure that resembles ribbing in conventional one-end knitting.

Decorative braids in one or multiple colours are obtained by knitting the initial row in such a way that it resembles how the final braid is to appear. For example, a two-coloured braid entails alternating between the two colours. The second row is purled, bringing the back yarn under the front yarn. The third row is purled, bringing the back yarn over the front yarn. Swapping the second and third row will give a braid in the opposite direction.

When knitting with two colours, two strands of yarn are used when the two colours are approximately of the same proportions. When winding two balls of differently coloured yarn, one colour is wound over the other. When there is a main colour and a contrasting colour, it is preferable to knit with two strands of the main coloured yarn and an additional strand of the contrasting coloured yarn. Long floats of the contrasting coloured yarn are avoided by catching the yarn at appropriate intervals.
