= Larka =

Surname list

Larka is a surname. Notable people with the surname include:

- Andres Larka (1879–1943), Estonian military commander
- Karl Lärka (1892–1981), Swedish documentary photographer

== See also ==
- Larkas
