= 2010 Bandy World Championship squads =

Below are the squads for the 2010 Bandy World Championship final tournament in Russia.

== Group A ==
=== Sweden ===
Coach: Franco Bergman

No.	Pos.	Player	Date of birth (age)	Caps	Club
	GK	Andreas Bergwall			(Russia) Dynamo Kazan
	GK	Anders Svensson			(Sweden) Edsbyn
		Olov Englund			(Sweden) Hammarby
		Linus Pettersson			(Sweden) Sandviken
		Per Hellmyrs			(Sweden) Bollnäs
		Andreas Westh			(Sweden) Bollnäs
		Daniel Berlin			(Sweden) Sandviken
		Hans Andersson			(Sweden) Edsbyn
		Stefan Erixon			(Sweden) Hammarby
		Daniel Välitalo			(Sweden) Edsbyn
		Daniel Jonsson			(Sweden) Broberg/Söderhamn
		Daniel Mossberg			(Sweden) Sandviken
		Jonas Edling			(Sweden) Edsbyn
		Patrik Nilsson			(Sweden) Hammarby
		Christoffer Edlund			(Sweden) Sandviken
		Daniel Andersson			(Sweden) Villa Lidköping
		Johan Andersson			(Sweden) Villa Lidköping
