= Larkas =

Surname list

Larkas is a surname. Notable people with the surname include:

- Mikko Larkas (born 1981), Finnish basketball coach
- Olavi Larkas (1913–1984), Finnish fencer and modern pentathlete
- Veikko Larkas (1909–1969), Finnish architect

== See also ==
- Larka
