= Daniel Jonsson =

Swedish soldier (1599–1663)

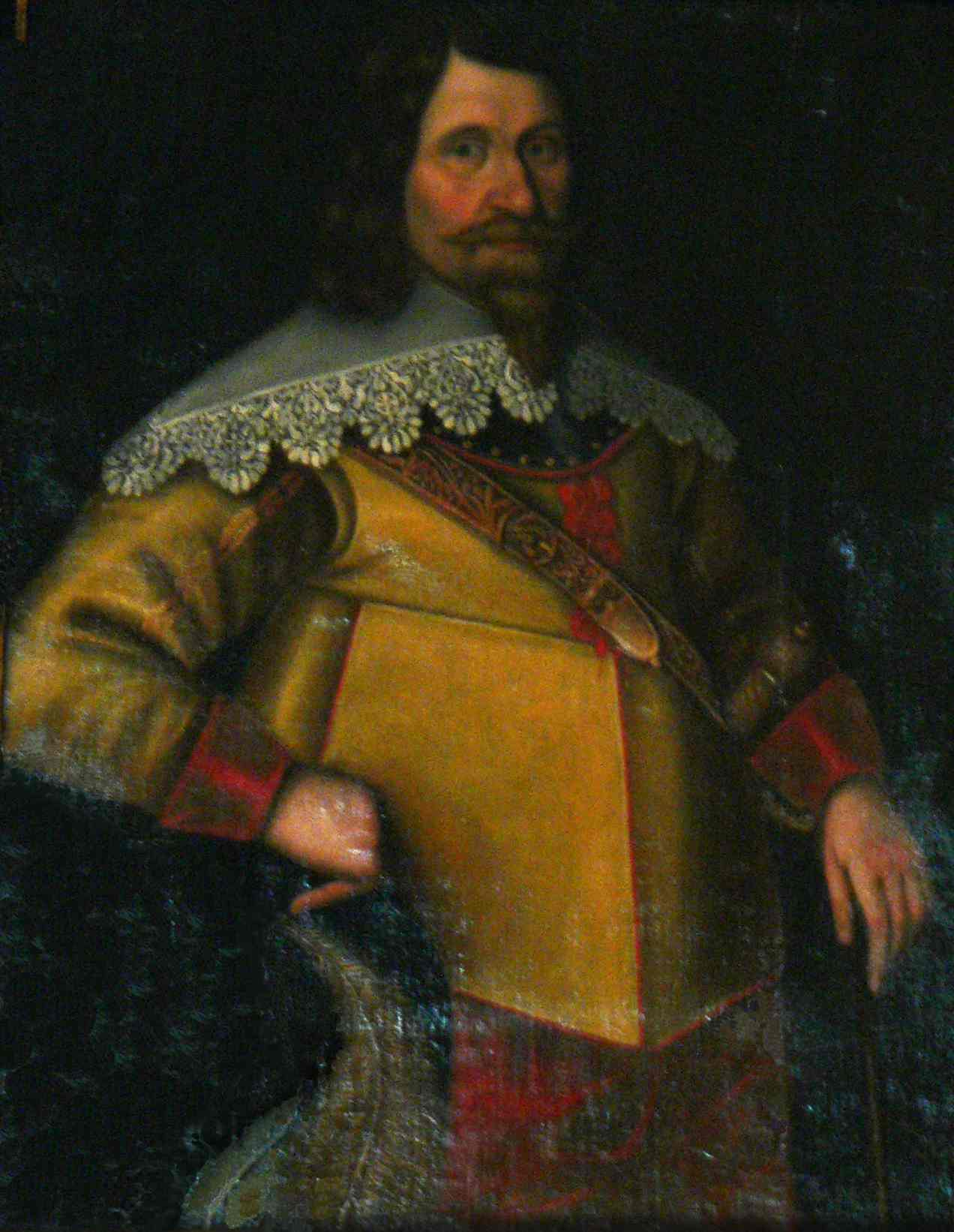
- Daniel Jonsson as portrayed in Mora church
- Born: 1599
- Died: 1663 (aged 63–64); Sollerön, Dalarna, Sweden
- Military career
- Allegiance: Sweden
- Branch: Mora Company, Dalarna Regiment, Swedish Army
- Service years: 1630–1656
- Rank: Major
- Commands: Mora kompani
- Conflicts: Thirty Years' War; Polish-Swedish War; Second Battle of Breitenfeld; Torstenson War

Daniel Jonsson (1599–1663) was a soldier and commander of Dalarna Regiment of the Swedish Empire.

== Background and family ==
Daniel Jonsson was born in 1599 in Bengtsarvet, Sollerön as the son of ensign Jon Andersson and Sara Olofsdotter. He has become something of a local hero in Sollerön and a rich variety of legends and stories have been set up around his exploits and life. He fought in the Thirty Years' War, and eventually advanced to the rank of Major and commander of Mora kompani.

In 1633 he married Margareta Danielsdotter Terseriana, granddaughter of the powerful pastor Ingelbertus Olai Helsingus in Leksand.

To commemorate the war hero Daniel Jonsson, an epitaph was placed in Mora church, some years after his death and just after liberation of Sollerö parish from Mora parish in 1775. In 1934 the epitaph got a duplicate in Sollerö Church.

== Military career ==
According to legend, it was actually Daniel's older brother who was called up to serve in war, but he was not very attracted by the warrior's call, and when sobbing saying his farewells, the younger brother got annoyed, threw the flail and took the older brother's place.

As 32-year-old ensign, he was part of the reinforcement of the Swedish army in Germany, that was later transferred to Pomerania in late June 1631. Two months later, he received his baptism of fire in the Battle of Breitenfeld. He also participated in the Battle of Lützen where Dalarna Regiment took part very lively and showed great bravery.

After two years of tireless combat against Tilly's and Wallenstein's armies, Dalarna Regiment was returned to Sweden. The rest was not long, however, and in the spring of 1634 the regiment had been supplemented to full strength and Daniel Jonsson was conscripted as lieutenant. In the spring of 1637 he was transferred to Germany with Dalarna Regiment and Mora Company under the command of Lars Carpelan. On 22 October 1642, he participated in the Second Battle of Breitenfeld, which ended with a brilliant victory over the Holy Roman Empire.

The following year, Dalarna Regiment was demobilized again, but the Danish war came and the regiment was ordered to Skåne, where Dalarna Regiment participated in the siege of Landskrona. In 1645 the homeward march ensued, but in 1648 was mustered again with Germany as the destination. By now, Daniel Jonsson had succeeded Lars Carpelan as company commander of Mora kompani. The regiment had scarcely reached the spot and the place when the Peace of Westphalia was concluded in October the same year.

The rest was interrupted again when Charles X Gustav declared war against Poland in 1655. Under Daniel Jonsson's command, the company marched from Mora to Stockholm for further sailing towards Wolgast. On July 15 the destination was reached and followed by the march towards Warsaw via Szczecin. The battle was bloody and Dalarna Regiment lost 182 men. If Daniel Jonsson was wounded is not known, but in 1656 he was granted leave as head of Mora kompani.

He was now 57 years old and his prime strengths were spent. However, in 1659 he was again in command, over "dalaallmogens utskottsfolk" (~"Dalarna peasantry militia") during an expedition against Norway, and it was probably during this campaign that he received his appointment to major.

== The promotion ==
How Daniel Jonson received his first command is a contentious issue. One popular version claims that the current commander was about to lead the squad to destruction, when Daniel roared up and shot down the commander to take the lead himself.

== The border to Siljansnäs and the night in jail ==
The Sollerö border with Siljansnäs was long disputed.

During Daniel Jonsson's campaign it had been decided that the men from Mora and Siljansnäs should march from their respective town, and the place at which they met should be the border. The Siljansnäs men were cunning and got the Dalecarlians drunk, so they didn't get beyond Stamnäs. When Daniel Jonson came back and found out that the border had been moved, he was infuriated and took the Sollerö men with him and burned down the Leksand ridge.

Such gestures could obviously not go unpunished and was up to the Supreme Court. When the king heard thereof, he cried "But he's my best man! Who can you put in his place?". The Major would still have to spend one Christmas Eve in Hållkvarnen (a mill) at Mångbro, a night when all the witches of Leksand were out and roaming. The Major found no better occupation than to cook a little pitch on the open fireplace, and in the middle of the night, a cat sat and meowed and cried. "Frjos du, Pitte?" (Are you cold kitty?) the major asked in his still extant native tongue, and then he threw his pitch boiling kettle straight in the face of the cat, which immediately disappeared.

It was that night that an old witch in Leksand became blind. The explanation was simple – nobody would go unpunished against Daniel Jonsson!
