= Karl Lärka =

Swedish documentary photographer

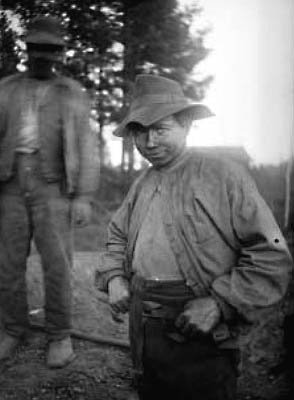
- Karl Lärka and Olspers Olson 1920, Photo: Karl Lärka/Mora Bygdearkiv
- Born: 24 July 1892; Sollerön Parish, Sweden
- Died: 2 June 1981 (aged 88); Mora Parish, Sweden
- Occupation: documentary photographer

Karl Lärka (born 24 July 1892 at Sollerön in Dalarna, Sweden, died 2 June 1981) was one of the more important 20th-century documentary photographers in Sweden. Lärka's prime concern was to document the peasant culture that he understood was beginning to disappear, and especially the culture of the lands around lake Siljan in Dalarna; one with agriculture, forestry and many people with stories about older times. Most of his photography was done from 1916 to 1934, and he combined it with lecture tours about the countryside of Siljan. He also documented many of the stories elderly people in the villages told him and was very active in the Swedish local heritage movement that started in the 1920s. More than 4,200 of his photographic plates are today in the municipal archive of Mora.

== Karl Lärka as photographer ==
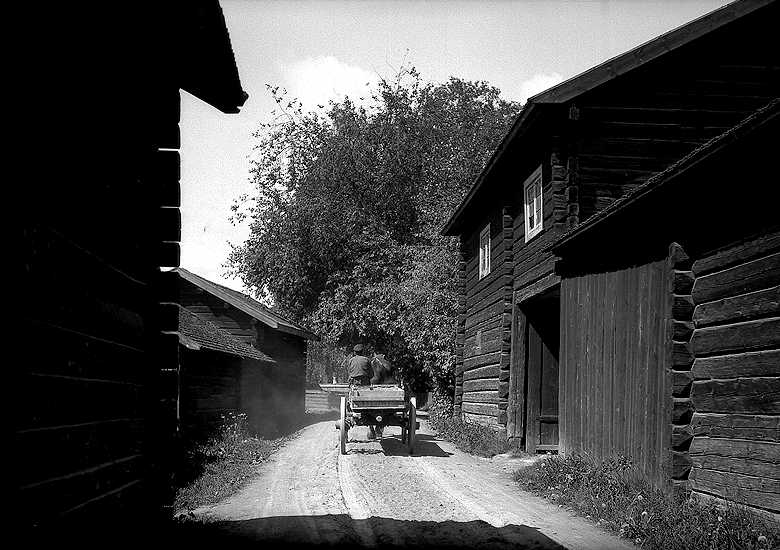
Village street in Östnor, the doorway of Rombogården to the right. Photo: Karl Lärka/Mora Bygdearkiv.

Karl Lärka's photographs are characterized by his concern to document a disappearing culture. People, animals, and buildings are portrayed in their own context. The people cultivate the land, work in the forest, build houses, wash clothes, cook, or pose with working horses. He describes weddings, people, interiors, transhumance, and village streets with a great sense of feeling for composition and quality.

Many of Lärka's portraits are typically documentary. People are portrayed in their daily chores, often in positions and with attributes they chose themselves. They differ significantly from the studio portraits of that time, in which people often dressed up and posed. With his connection to the Swedish labour movement, Lärka was known as a "democratic photographer". He let people decide for themselves what to wear, how they wanted to stand, and whether or not they should smile or not. The documentary work procedure of Lärka is also shown in his recording of older people's stories, a method he combined with his photography.

During his photographic career, Lärka experienced great developments in photographic technique. In the early days of the 20th century he used photographic plates, like all other serious photographers. He got his first box camera during his time at a folk high school. Later he changed for a larger-format American camera acquired from a retailer who had bought it for photographing thieves in his shop at Sollerön.

Lärka experimented with mixtures of magnesium and potassium permanganate for flash and did "reverted" enlargements before enlargers arrived, by illuminating photographic paper through the camera lens. Later, when he had access to an enlarger, Lärka copied his pictures onto fine-grain film to be able to show his pictures in his skioptikon (an early form of slide projector) at his lectures.

The large plates were heavy, and when they were exposed, Lärka was forced to find a dark space and reload. When the first sheet film arrived, his work was made easier and there was no longer any risk that the light would disappear while reloading, which sometimes had happened before.

One of his cameras was an American large format camera, made for 13×18 in (33×46 cm) plates, equipped with separate shutter (Thornton-Pickard Snap-Shot, 1–1/80 sec), Aplanat B no 4 lens from E Suter (Basel) and separate Waterhouse stop (1:4 or 1:8). He also used three smaller folding cameras for the format 10×15 cm. In later life, when he no longer photographed professionally, he got a modern camera for 135 film and took both color and black-and-white photos.

== Childhood and youth ==
Karl Lärka was born in 1892 in the village of Gruddbo at Sollerön in Dalarna, Sweden. When he was thirteen he was taught by Uno Stadius, who had a folk high school at Sollerön and told Lärka the importance of documenting everything he observed regarding culture and history. The Lärka family had economic troubles which led to the suicide of Jöns Lärka, Karl's father, in 1906. This struck Karl Lärka particularly hard since he had to help support the family by forestry and farm work. Thus it was only after his military service that Lärka had a chance to think about his own future. He dreamt of becoming a builder and was a capable draughtsman, but there was no money for any higher education. Instead he started his education at the Bachmans school for handicraft in Hedemora. There he got to know the district court judge Lars Trotzig, who understood Lärka's talent and tried to help him get a scholarship for an education in civil engineering at the Royal Institute of Technology in Stockholm.

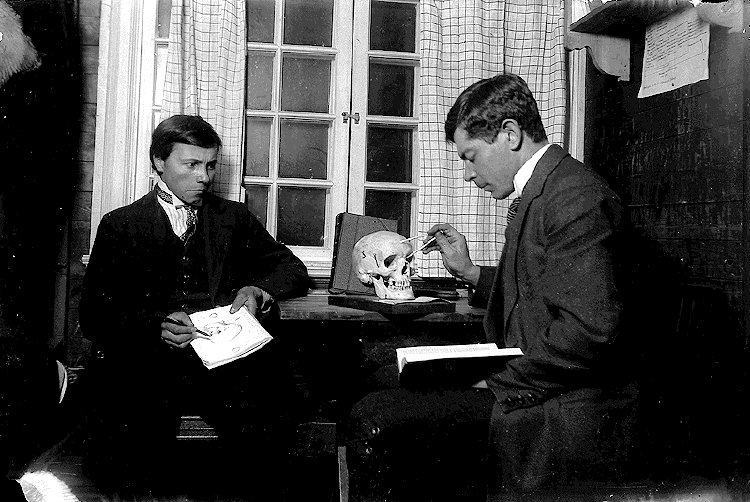
Karl Lärka and Johan Öhman at the folk high school of Brunnsvik, 1915. Photo: Karl Lärka/Mora Bygdearkiv.

Thanks to his contacts with Trotzig and later on Anders Zorn, Lärka got the opportunity to work with some building restoration projects. He documented many, among them the restoration of Zorns Gammelgård. He never got the chance to become a civil engineer, as Trotzig never succeeded in getting him a scholarship. Instead, he took winter courses at the folk high school of Brunnsvik in 1915–1917 and became good friends with his classmate Dan Andersson.

Inspired by another classmate, Johan Öhman, Lärka started photographing the peasant culture at Sollerön. He did this with Öhman and initially with Öhman's camera, but by charging his classmates for portraits, Lärka could afford the first camera of his own, a simple Agfa.

== Photography projects and lecture tours ==
After his education at Brunnsvik, Lärka started working on commission as a documentary photographer. In 1919 he was engaged by the local history association of Dalarna to document people in the village of Finngruvan in Venjan, Dalarna. The project was part of a racial study of a kind then regarded as scientific. Little is known about Lärka's own opinions about such studies. It is known that he was not that interested in the categorizing of the people of Dalarna in different groups according to their skulls, and preferred to listen to the stories of the old men. He was known for having no respect for representatives of the authorities, and took a well-known photograph of Dan Andersson while Andersson was making a fool of the Stockholm ethnologists in the project.

Lärka tried to get the Nordic Museum interested in making an inventory of the parish of Sollerön and tried to get funds to gather his notes and photos. He did not succeed in any of this. Lärka became recognized as a good photographer, but his commitment to preserving and documenting the culture of the lands around lake Siljan was first recognized many years later.

By this time, Lärka started his lecture tours. They started as picture shows for friends and others in the villages around Siljan, with the help of a so-called sciopticon. It was the first time many in the audience had experienced any of the forerunners of cinema. After a while the activity grow larger and Lärka's lecture tours were included in tours organised from Stockholm, with many lecturers involved. Lärka lectured during 1920 all over Sweden, often dressed in Sollerö costume and sometimes together with the folk musician Axel Myrman.

At the same time, Lärka still documented, both in writing and photos, his home district on his own initiative.

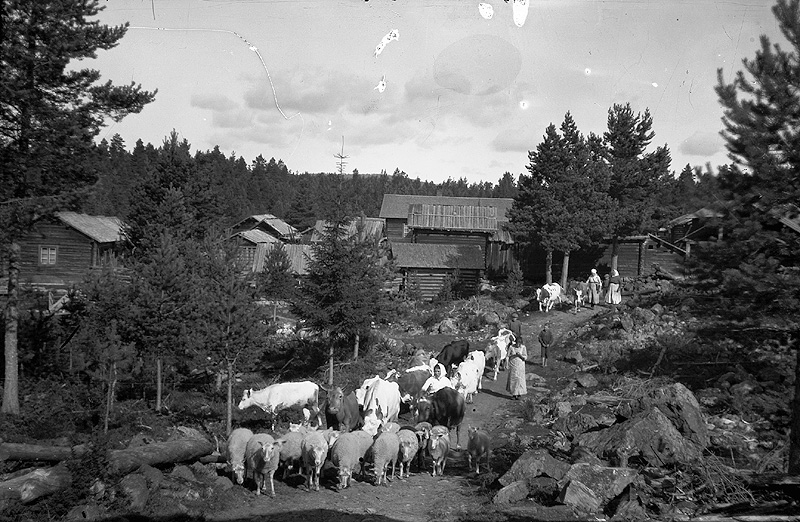
Axi fäbodar, 1920. Photo: Karl Lärka/Mora Bygdearkiv.

In 1924 he assisted Gustaf Ankarcrona in photographing old wall-paintings in Dalarna. The whole work was supposed to result in an exhibition and a book, but Ankarcrona became ill during the inventory trip and never fully recovered; as a consequence, the book was never printed. The material was eventually published in Svante Svärdström's doctoral thesis from 1949 Lärka's colour photographs were made by separation negatives, because colour film was not widely known.

== Marriage and the burial grounds at Sollerön ==
Until 1926, Karl Lärka lived in the Lärka House at Sollerön. In 1925 he married Svea Romson, and the following year they moved to Rombo House in Östnor, owned by Svea's father, Erik Romson. Lärka continued with his lecturing, which was not regarded as a respectable occupation by all the villagers. A married man should be home working on his farm, was the general opinion.

Karl Lärka's parents-in-law passed on in the 1930s and he and his wife became thereby fully responsible for Rombo Farm, a comparatively large farm with many dairy cows, horses, pigs, goats, and arable land. The couple were childless and therefore the niece and nephews from Hofors were welcome guests during summer. They also accompanied Karl and Svea Lärka and the farm animals to the summer pasture farms, which still was used. One of these was the cottage at Klikten. During the 1940s, 1950s, and 1960s Karl Lärka and his wife managed the farm on their own, in the later years often without help and often with very little money. Sometimes it was a struggle, and Lärka's ingeniousness was probably a good help. In the early years he often built much of his photo equipment himself, and this experience was also useful in farming.

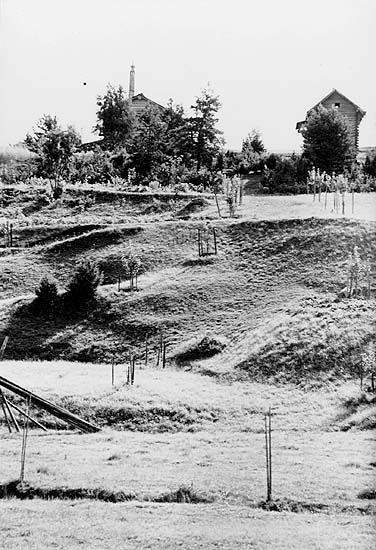
The Lärka cottage at Kliktbåck, Sollerön. Photo: Karl Lärka/Mora Bygdearkiv.

As the great burial ground from the Viking Age was discovered at Sollerön in 1928, Karl Lärka became very engaged in investigating and preserving it for future generations. The burial ground was located just a stone's throw from the cottage he and Svea had built for themselves at Klikten in Sollerön. Lärka spent a lot of time trying to preserve the burial ground from the destruction due to farming and stone-clearing operations. During the 1930s Lärka's camera was broken, and he had no funds to get a new one. The work at their farm, his engagement for the burial ground, and the couple's poor incomes meant there was neither money nor time for Karl Lärka to go on photographing. But he did preserve his darkroom over the years.

== Distinctions ==
- 1926 – The Artur Hazeliusmedal of the Nordic Museum, in bronze
- 1956 – The medal of Dalarnas Fornminnes - och Hembygdsförbund
- 1966 – The plaque of The Society of Caretaking of The Heritage
- 1972 – Silver medal of The Royal Swedish Academy of Letters, History and Antiquities
- 2000 – Named one of the premier photographers of the former century, by the Swedish photo magazine "Foto"

== Exhibitions ==
- 1964 – The Zorn Museum, Mora
- 1968 – The W-68 exhibition in Rättvik
- 1975 – Exhibition in Oslo
- 1980 – The Trustee Savings Bank in Ludvika
- 1981 – Posthumous Exhibition in Paris
- 1992 – The House of Culture in Mora
- 2001–2002 – The Zorn Museum, Mora
- 2002 – The House of Culture in Mora
- 2004 – Kulturhuset in Stockholm

== Bibliography ==
Examples of printed work Karl Lärka contributed to:

- Budkavlen (1919)
- Med Dalälven från källorna till havet av KE Forslund, delarna Mora och Siljan. (1921)
- Spelmansporträtt åt Nils och Olov Andersson (1921–1925), Dalarnas hembygdsförbund, årgång 3
- Om Dan Andersson, Skeriols kamrattidning 1952 (1955) Skansvakten n:r 40
- Fäbodminnen (1965)
- Bilder från skogen (1967) Dalarnas hembygdsbok
- Fäder och fädernearv (1968) Samfundet för hembygdsvård
- Sool-öen, Sollerö hembygdsförening 1972 (1976)
- Karl Lärkas Dalarna (1974) Sune Jonsson
- Karl Lärka berättar (1982) Greta Jakobsson
- Karl Lärka – odalman, fotograf, hembygdsvårdare (2001)
- Kråk Ulof i Bäck å ana rikti fok. Fotografier av Karl Lärka 1916–1934 (2004)
