= Nostepinne =

Tool for winding yarn

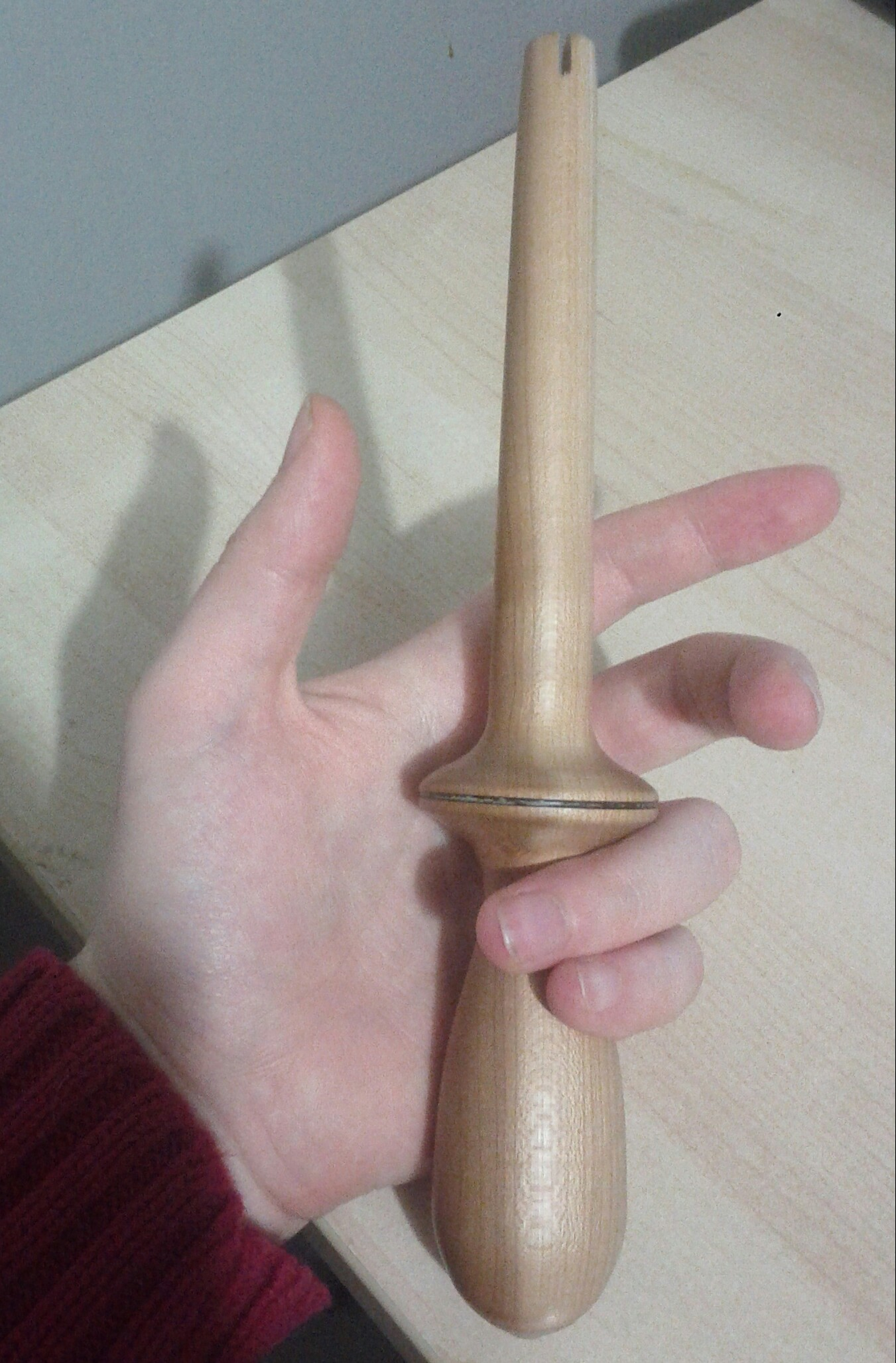
A nostepinne with a notched top

The nostepinne, also known as a nostepinde or nøstepinde, is a tool used in the fiber arts to wind yarn, often yarn that has been hand spun, into a ball for easily knitting, crocheting, or weaving from. In its simplest form, it is a dowel, generally between 10–12 inches (25–30 cm) long and most frequently made of wood, around which yarn can be wound. Decoratively and ornately carved nostepinnes are common. The top of the nostepinne sometimes incorporates a notch or a groove which allows one end of the yarn to be held secure while the rest is wound into a ball.

The ball of yarn formed by a nostepinne is a "center pull" ball, allowing the knitter to remove the working yarn from the center of the ball rather than the outside. This keeps the yarn from rolling around the surface the yarn is sitting on and provides a more consistent tension. These center-pull balls are called "cakes" because of their short, cylindrical shape.
