= Sollerön =

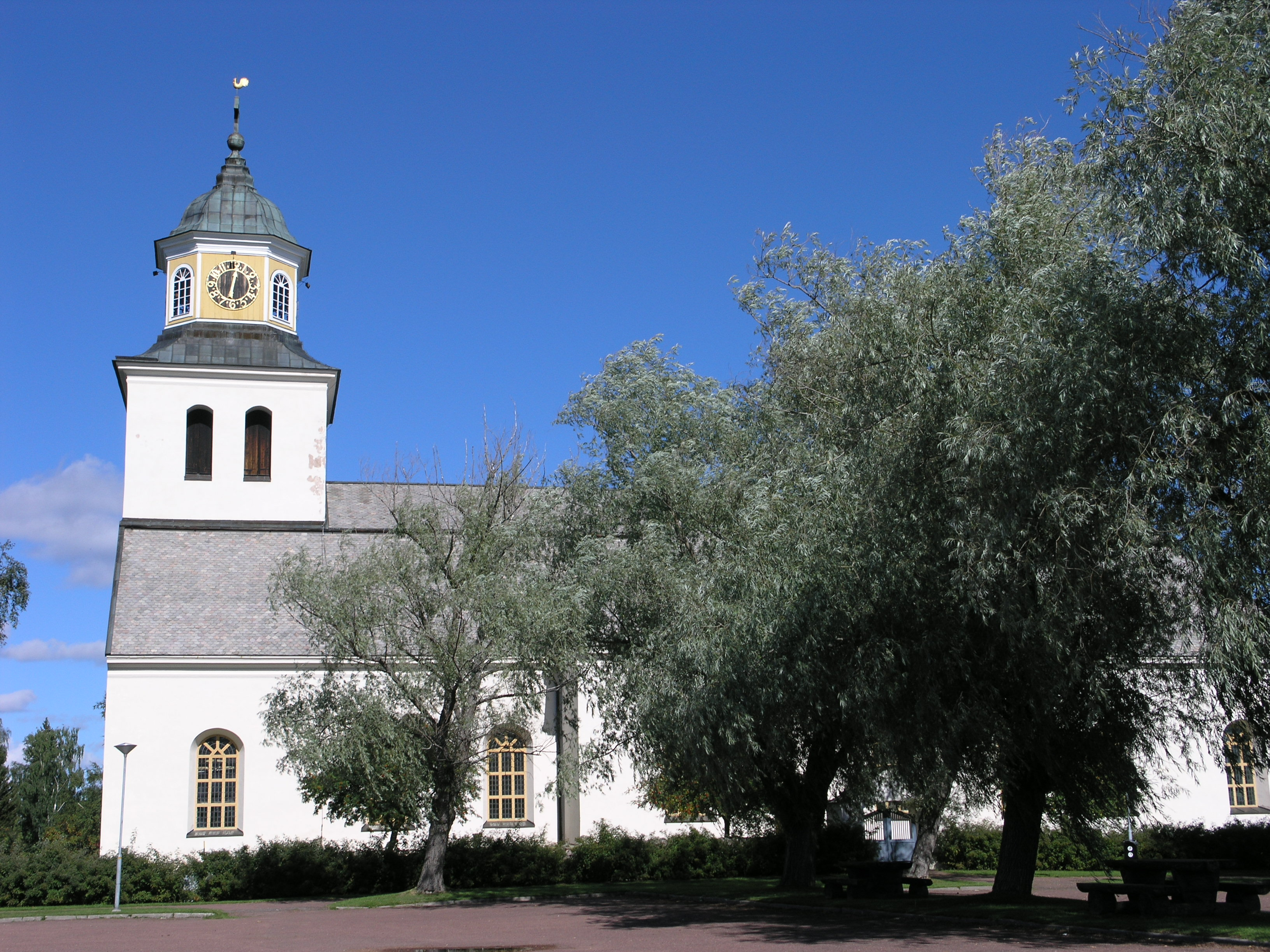
- Sollerön Church

- Location within Dalarna Location within Sweden
- Coordinates: 60°54′58″N 14°36′58″E
- Country: Sweden
- Province: Dalarna
- County: Dalarna County
- Municipality: Mora Municipality

Area
  - Total: 2.50 km^{2} (0.97 sq mi)

Population (31 December 2010)
  - Total: 901
  - Density: 360/km^{2} (930/sq mi)
- Time zone: UTC+1 (CET)
  - Summer (DST): UTC+2 (CEST)

Sollerön (Swedish pronunciation: [ˈsɔ̂lːɛrˌøːn]) is the largest island in Lake Siljan and a locality situated in Mora Municipality, Dalarna County, Sweden. It had 901 inhabitants in 2010.

== History ==
=== Sites ===
The island is home to several notable archaeological and historical sites, including Dalarna's largest Viking-era grave fields, a historic church, restored 18th-19th century farmhouses, the Viking museum has now closed.

==== Viking Graves ====
In the northern part of Sollerön, there are two large grave fields from the end of the Viking Age: one major at Bengtsarvet-Häradsarvet-Rothagen and one smaller at Utanmyra. Large Viking age graves have also been found elsewhere in Dalarna, such as in Orsa and on Tunaslätten, but the Sollerön grave site is the largest known site of its kind in Dalarna. Together, the grave sites contain up to as many as 100-150 graves. Eighteen of the graves have been excavated, 11 of which have been investigated.

Sollerögravarna, as the Viking grave area is known in Swedish, is thought to be so well preserved due to it being constructed of stone, rather than only soil. The grave fields consist mainly of the sparsely-placed smoke and piles with a diameter of 6–15 meters. Not all of the mounds are tombs, as many of the rocky areas are also the result of land clearing by farmers over a period of centuries.

In fact, for a long time, it was believed that the mounds of Sollerön were merely remnants from the crops of farmers. However, in 1921 a discovery showed that the mounds concealed graves. The villagers also noted previous findings of "iron scraps" from the village of Utanmyra.

Only when villagers discovered additional graves in 1928, did they begin to realize that the entire area was actually a series of grave fields. Excavations of these fields took place in 1928-29 and also in 1934. Eleven grave sites were examined. In each of these graves, the bodies had been cremated before burial, and coal remnants along with burned bones were discovered in the burial mounds.

Many other artifacts have also been found in the mounds. These include like arrows, glass beads, bronze rings and horse equipment. The objects show similarities to those found in Viking graves around Scandinavia, for example in Mälardalen, Jämtland and Tröndelag.

=== Origins of the name ===
"Sol" is the Swedish word for "sun," and "ön" means "the island (of)" in Swedish. Due to its name and the large amount of ancient burial mounds found on the island, historians have speculated that the island may have been a place for sun worship.

== Culture ==
=== Language ===
Soldmål is a dialect spoken by inhabitants of the island.

== Villages ==
Sollerön is home to the following villages:

- Häradsarvet is Sollerön's central area with a church, a post office, and shops. Within the village a large part of the old city environment is preserved.
- The Bengts Heritage area (known as Bengtsarvet in Swedish) consists of loose cohesive farm sites on a slightly sloping hillside. Most of the buildings are red in the traditional Swedish style, and many buildings have been remodeled in recent times.
- Utanmyra is located west of the Bengts Heritage area and consists of a large building block and several smaller farms. Several of the farms have also been remodeled.
- Rothagen is an elongated city west of the church. The village is old, but has recently received an uptick of villagers.
- Gruddbo is a relatively large town located south of the church. The settlement is located on a western slope. The farms are largely restored and located in cliffs at the buildings. In some parts the outbuildings are close to the street and form narrow streets.
- Rullbodarna, or The Rollerbars, is located south of Gruddbo and are a small cliff town with farms grouped along the city road. In several places the outbuildings are close to the road. Most farms are recessed or have angular strings. Many of the buildings have been remodeled in recent times.
- Kulåra is located on the southwestern part of Sollerön and is a klungby that has direct contact with Siljan. The village is small and dense and the farms are grouped around the road. Circular farms are common. The multi-storey buildings have in some cases been more or less rebuilt in recent times. In the village there is also a swimming area, Kulårabadet, for which the village is responsible.
- Bodarna is the southernmost village on the island and lies east of Kulåra. The village is a small terraced village with the buildings grouped along the road. The Bodens were former farms. The village is situated in an open farmland with large pastures. In the village there is also a swimming area, Rävnäsbadet, for which the village is responsible.
- Bråmåbo is the easternmost of Sollerön's villages, which consists of a small group of dwellings. In the north of the village, the outbuildings are close to the street and in the south, newer residential buildings have been added. Around the settlement are large open fields and meadows. In the village there is also a swimming area, Bäckstabadet, for which the village is responsible.

== Notable people ==
- Karl Lärka, Swedish documentary photographer, was born in Sollerön.
- Winona Oak, Swedish singer-songwriter
