= Färnebofjärden National Park =

Swedish national park

- Färnebofjärdens nationalpark
- IUCN category II (national park)
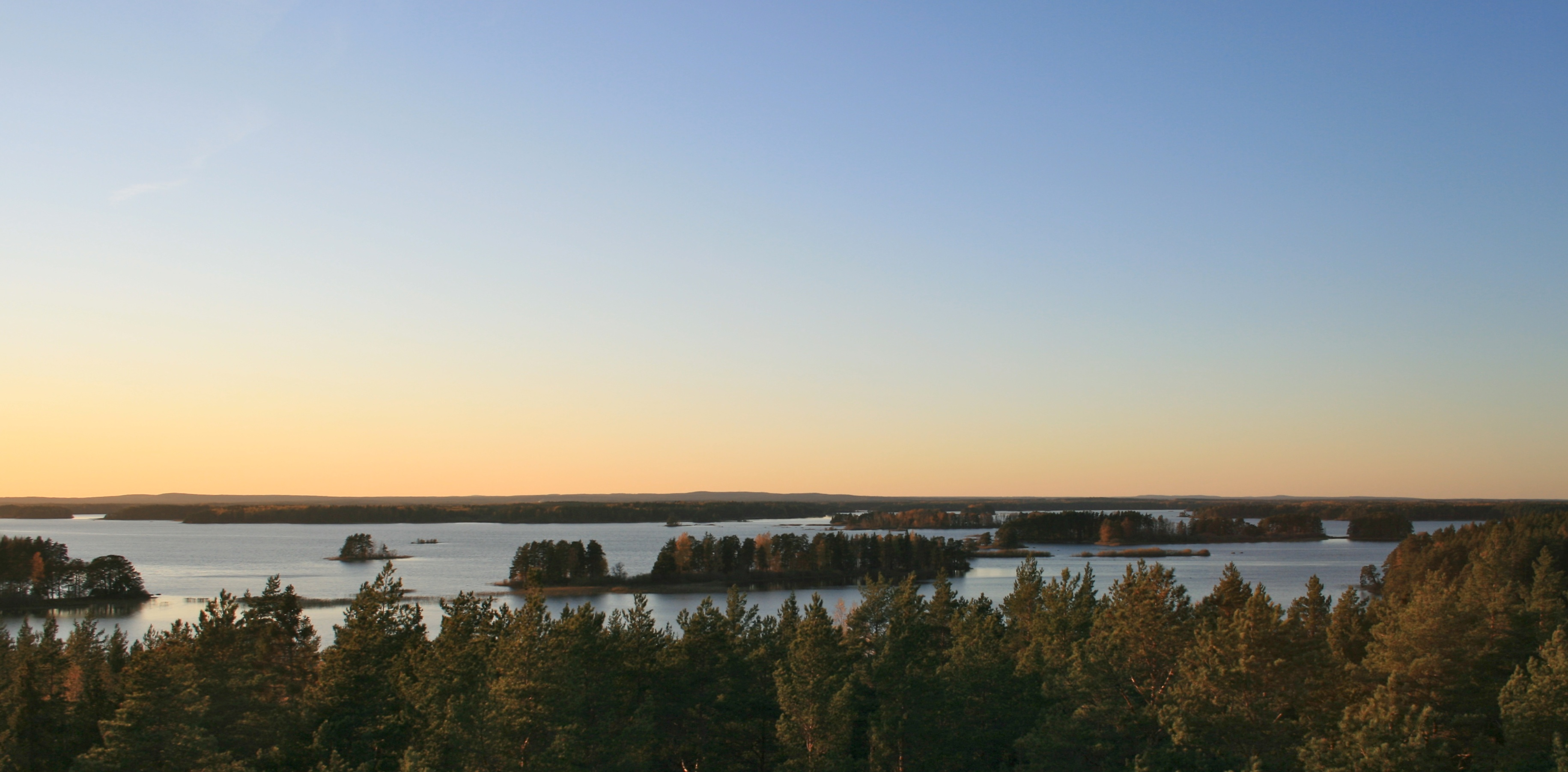

- Location within Sweden
- Location: Avesta, Sandviken, Heby and Sala Municipalities, Dalarna, Gävleborg, Uppsala and Västmanland Counties, Sweden
- Nearest city: Heby, Sandviken
- Coordinates: 60°11′N 16°46′E
- Area: 101 km^{2} (39 sq mi)
- Established: 1998
- Governing body: Naturvårdsverket
- Website: www.farnebofjarden.se

Ramsar Wetland
- Official name: Färnebofjärden
- Designated: 14 November 2001
- Reference no.: 1116

National parks of Sweden (clickable map)

Färnebofjärden National Park (Swedish: Färnebofjärdens nationalpark) is a Swedish national park traversed by the river Dalälven, about 140 km (87 mi) north of Stockholm. It covers 10,100 ha (25,000 acres), of which 4,110 ha (10,200 acres) aquatic, on the frontier between the counties of Dalarna and Gävleborg.

After the retreat of the ice sheet that covered the region after the last ice age, the river found itself rerouted by an esker onto a plain uniquely ribbed by the ridges of other eskers, where it formed a succession of rapids and wide bays (called fjärdar), which the river inundates during the spring floods. This particular hydrography, along with the park's proximity to the ecological frontier between the north and the south, has favored the development of a fauna and flora of great biodiversity. The park possesses coniferous, mixed, and broadleaf forests, some of which quite ancient, spared by the logging industry because of their inaccessibility. These forests constitute the ideal environment for numerous species, in particular birds, with critical densities of woodpeckers and owls.

If the presence of humans was relatively discreet since the Stone Age, concentrated principally atop the eskers, the development of mining activity (in particular of iron) has profoundly affected the region. The forests were exploited to feed the water-powered forges which grew up along the river. One of the most important was that of Gysinge, founded in 1668 and situated right next to the park. In 1975, in reaction to the threat of the clearing of a vast forest, the movement for the creation of a national park began, culminating in the park's opening in 1998. The park was added to the Natura 2000 Network and included in the Ramsar Convention's list of wetlands.

The park and its environs are important tourist destinations. The river is its favored mode of discovery, but some hiking trails permit other explorations. The park is equally appreciated by fishing enthusiasts.

== Toponymy ==
The park takes its name from Färnebofjärden, which designates the entire section of the river between Tyttbo and Gysinge. The name means "fjärd of Färnebo". The Swedish word fjärd has the same etymology as the Norwegian word fjord, both of which Scandinavian words mean "an expanse of water in a channel". Most of the bodies of water called fjords in Norwegian were steep glacial valleys into which the sea had penetrated, which was the more restrictive definition which passed into French and English. The name Fjärnebo is the ancient name of the village of Österfärnebo ("East Färnebo"), situated near the park; its name changed in the 17th century to distinguish it from a Färnebo in Västmanland, which was itself rebaptized Västerfärnebo ("West Färnebo"). The name of the village means "habitation (bo) next to the fjärd of horsetails (fräken, which became Färne)".

== Geography ==
=== Location and environs ===
Park map

The park straddles the municipalities of Sala in Västmanland County, Heby in Uppsala County, Avesta in Dalarna County, and Sandviken in Gävleborg County. It contains a section of the Lower Dalälven, which since the Middle Ages has marked the frontier between Svealand and Norrland. The park's main entrance, at Gysinge, is about 77 km (48 mi) from the city of Uppsala and so about 140 km (87 mi) from Stockholm.

The park proper includes most of the fjärd of Färnebofjärden and the river's floodplain, as well as parts of the surrounding lowlands, for a total area of more than 10,100 ha (25,000 acres), of which 4,110 ha (10,200 acres) are water. The only parts of the fjärd not included in the park are the peninsulas of Östa and Ista, since they are inhabited, but these are protected by nature reserves of 600 ha (1,500 acres) and 770 ha (1,900 acres), respectively. In addition, the park is bordered by several additional preserves: 920 ha (2,300 acres) at Hedesundafjärden, 950 ha (2,300 acres) at Jordbärsmuren-Ålbo, and 463 ha (1,140 acres) at Gysinge, for a combined area, with the park and peninsula reserves, of more than 3,000 ha (7,400 acres).

=== Terrain ===
The terrain of the park is overall flat, with an altitude ranging from 56 m (184 ft) to 75 m (246 ft) below sea level. Certain parts are nevertheless quite hilly, such as Torrösundet, Långvindsjön and the valleys of the Tiån and the Storån. In addition, the ridge Enköpingsåsen cuts across the park, with a maximum height of 18 m (59 ft), crisscrossing the region over 300 km (190 mi) between Trosa to the south and Bollnäs to the north. This ridge spans the river and creates, among other land features, the isle of Sandön and the peninsula of Ista. The river has largely flooded this flat and irregular zone, creating a mosaic of water, dry earth, and wetlands. The park also includes several bays (Östaviken, Andersboviken, Edsviken, etc.) as well as 200 islands and skerries, the largest islands being Mattön, Torrön, Ängsön, Vedön, Rosön and Västerön.

=== Climate ===
The park is situated in a continental climate (Dfb in the Köppen climate classification), with rain mostly in summer. It is situated on the climate frontier between north and south, which helps determine the Limes Norrlandicus marking the border between the north of Scandinavia and the south. The snow cover lasts a little over 3 months and the river is frozen during a similar period, with the exception of the rapids, which remain ice-free for most of the winter.

Climate data for Kerstinbo 2002–2021 (extremes since 1995)
Month	Jan	Feb	Mar	Apr	May	Jun	Jul	Aug	Sep	Oct	Nov	Dec	Year
Record high °C (°F)	9.0 (48.2)	11.8 (53.2)	18.6 (65.5)	24.0 (75.2)	28.4 (83.1)	30.2 (86.4)	32.8 (91.0)	34.0 (93.2)	26.0 (78.8)	20.9 (69.6)	15.7 (60.3)	12.5 (54.5)	34.0 (93.2)
Mean maximum °C (°F)	5.8 (42.4)	7.6 (45.7)	13.6 (56.5)	18.7 (65.7)	23.7 (74.7)	27.2 (81.0)	28.7 (83.7)	27.4 (81.3)	22.2 (72.0)	15.6 (60.1)	10.6 (51.1)	7.0 (44.6)	29.8 (85.6)
Mean daily maximum °C (°F)	−0.8 (30.6)	0.4 (32.7)	4.5 (40.1)	10.5 (50.9)	15.9 (60.6)	20.3 (68.5)	22.8 (73.0)	21.0 (69.8)	16.3 (61.3)	9.3 (48.7)	4.2 (39.6)	0.9 (33.6)	10.4 (50.8)
Daily mean °C (°F)	−3.4 (25.9)	−3.0 (26.6)	0.0 (32.0)	5.0 (41.0)	10.0 (50.0)	14.5 (58.1)	17.1 (62.8)	15.7 (60.3)	11.5 (52.7)	5.7 (42.3)	1.6 (34.9)	−1.9 (28.6)	6.1 (42.9)
Mean daily minimum °C (°F)	−6.9 (19.6)	−6.6 (20.1)	−4.5 (23.9)	−0.5 (31.1)	4.1 (39.4)	8.6 (47.5)	11.3 (52.3)	10.4 (50.7)	6.6 (43.9)	2.1 (35.8)	−1.0 (30.2)	−4.7 (23.5)	1.6 (34.8)
Mean minimum °C (°F)	−20.1 (−4.2)	−18.7 (−1.7)	−14.9 (5.2)	−7.1 (19.2)	−3.5 (25.7)	1.6 (34.9)	5.0 (41.0)	2.3 (36.1)	−1.2 (29.8)	−6.2 (20.8)	−11.5 (11.3)	−16.1 (3.0)	−23.5 (−10.3)
Record low °C (°F)	−31.1 (−24.0)	−28.3 (−18.9)	−27.0 (−16.6)	−10.7 (12.7)	−5.7 (21.7)	−1.9 (28.6)	0.3 (32.5)	−1.5 (29.3)	−7.0 (19.4)	−12.5 (9.5)	−21.6 (−6.9)	−29.7 (−21.5)	−31.1 (−24.0)
Average precipitation mm (inches)	37.3 (1.47)	29.2 (1.15)	28.0 (1.10)	25.5 (1.00)	41.9 (1.65)	65.7 (2.59)	65.0 (2.56)	72.9 (2.87)	42.3 (1.67)	56.5 (2.22)	45.2 (1.78)	41.5 (1.63)	551 (21.69)
Source 1: SMHI Open Data for Kerstinbo A, precipitation
Source 2: SMHI Open Data for Kerstinbo A, temperature

=== Hydrography ===
Flooding in Färnebofjärden National Park
Map of the park with the flooded areas in red.

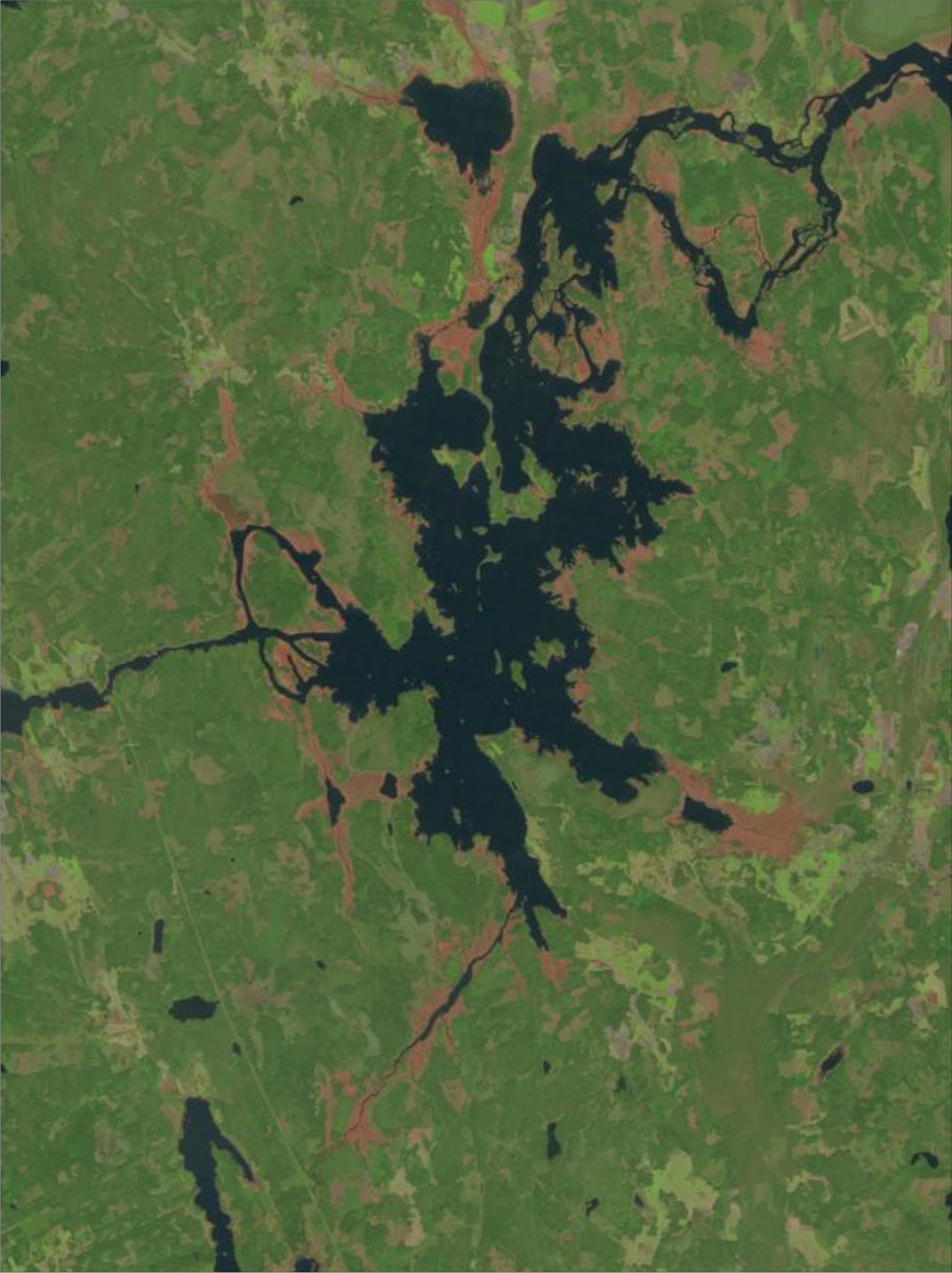
Satellite map of the river at its normal level, 6 May 2007.

Satellite map of the flood of 7 May 2002.

The park is situated along the course of the Dalälven, the second longest Swedish river at 541 km (336 mi). The river begins at the confluence of the Västerdal River and the Österdal River in Gagnef Municipality. At Avesta, the river, which until then was trapped in a narrow valley, becomes the Lower Dalälven (Nedre Dalälven), and large floodplains (called fjärdar) alternate with zones of rapids. Färnebofjärden is the first big floodplain of the Lower Dalälven, situated between the rapids of Tyttbo to the west and Gysinge and Sevedskvarn to the east.

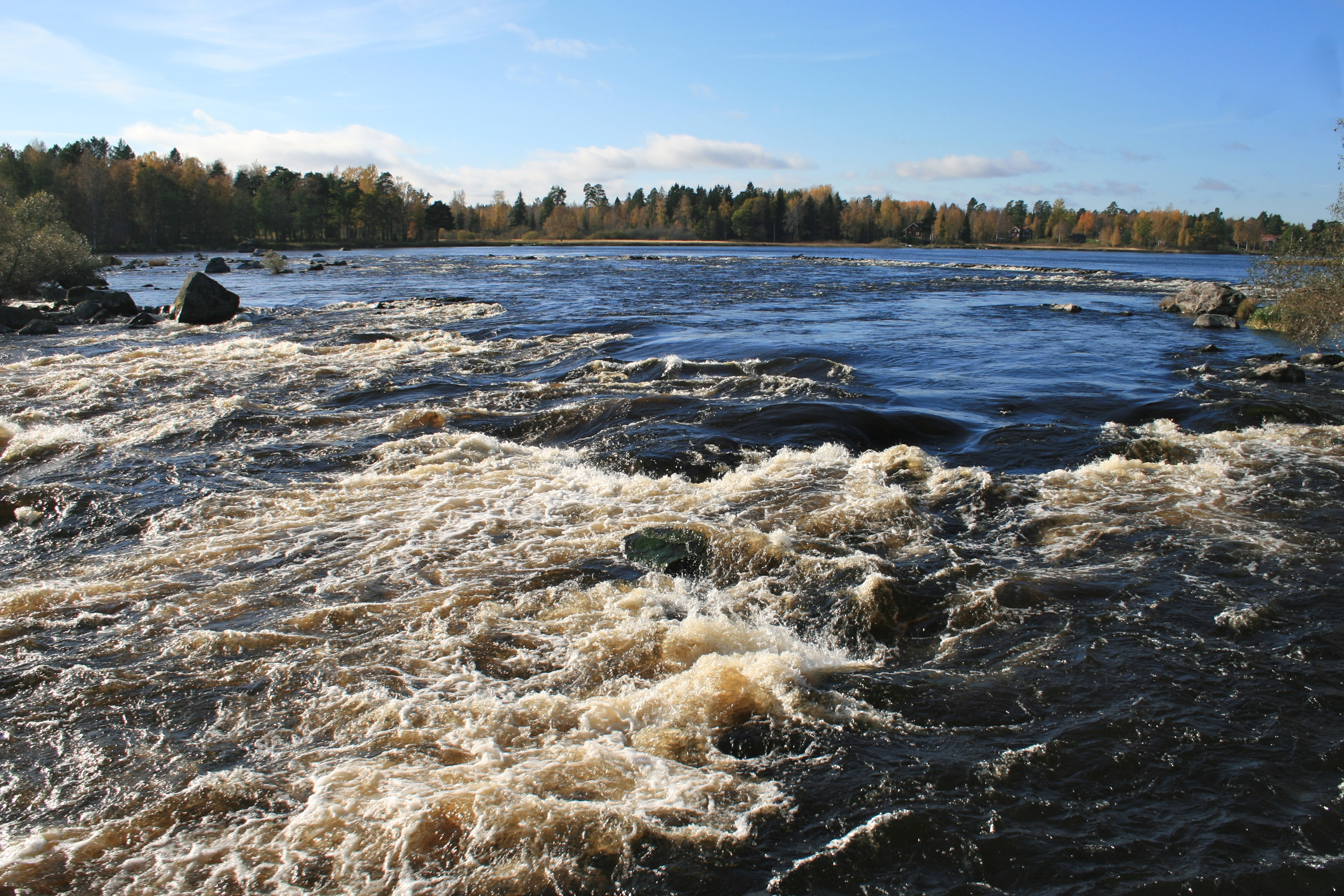
The rapids of Gysinge

At Gysinge, the river already has a watershed of 28,000 km^{2} (11,000 sq mi), for an average flow of 350 m^{3}/s (12,000 cu ft/s). While the flow of the river Österdalälven is controlled (at Trängslet and the lake Siljan), the course of the Västerdalälven is free, and thus has the largest seasonal variations. As a result, when it reaches the park, the river is still relatively little regulated, with a speed varying from 50 m^{3}/s (1,800 cu ft/s) to more than 2,000 m^{3}/s (71,000 cu ft/s). It is, in particular, the sole fjärd with a mouth that remains unregulated. The regulation of the Österdalälven has all the same an impact upon Färnebofjärden, the great inundations of the plains during the spring floods being more rare, even if they are nevertheless capable of inundating several dozens of square kilometers.

Besides the Dalälven, there are many streams inside the park, which flow into the river. Among these, one can number the Lillån, the Storån, the Alderbäcken and the Tiån on the right (south) bank, and Bärreksån and Laggarboån along the right bank. One can find also five small lakes inside the park, in particular around Tinäset. It is also near Tinäset that the principal bogs of the park, Lindebergsmossen and Svarviksmossen, are situated. 2,150 ha (5,300 acres) of the park are marshes and bogs, making up more than 20% of its total surface, and more than a third of the non-aquatic surface area of the park.

== Geology ==
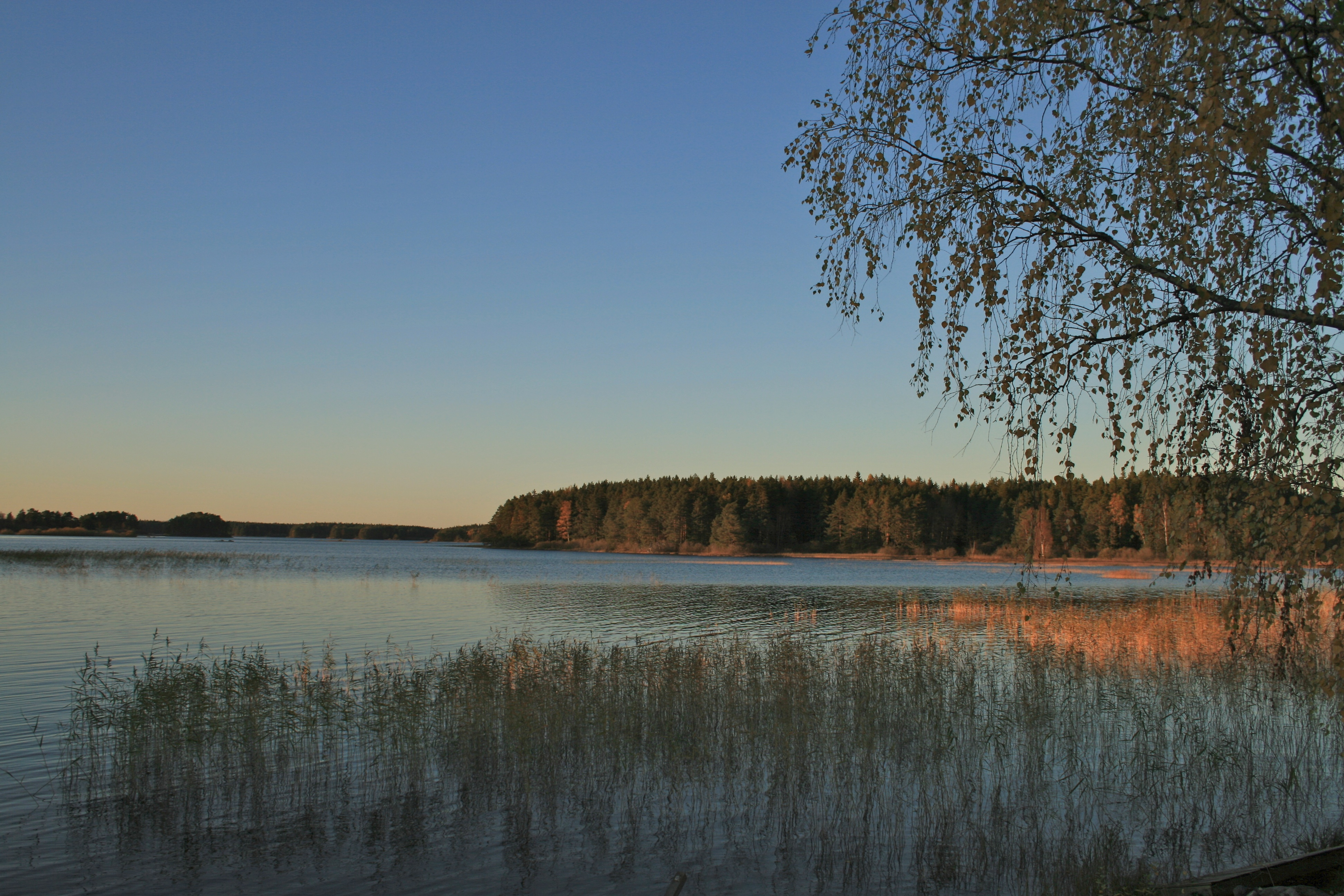
Along its new course, the river created a mosaic of water, marsh, and forest

The bedrock of the park is of granite and granitic gneiss, and dates from the formation of the Svecofennids, a mountain chain formed between 1750 and 2500 million years ago. Subsequently, the area underwent a long period of erosion, so that by leading 600 million years ago the so-called Sub-Cambrian peneplain had formed.

During the last ice age, Sweden was covered with an ice sheet, which withdrew from the region about 10000 years ago. The glacier left behind in the region many eskers and moraines, such as the esker Enköpingsåsen. When the glacier withdrew, the soil had been so compressed by its mass that the entire zone situated to the east of Avesta found itself at sea level. During this maritime period, sediments deposited themselves on the bedrock, which explains why that region even today has superior fertility to that of the rest of the country. It is the reason why the line of separation between the north and the south (the Limes Norrlandicus), which passes not far from the park, is so visible in the region: the zone to the north of the limes was not covered with these sediments.

When this sea, called the Littorina Sea, the ancestor of the Baltic Sea, withdrew, the Dalälven found itself blocked at Avesta by one of these eskers formed by the ice sheet: Badelundaåsen. In effect, before the ice age, the river continued in the direction of the Mälaren, in which it emptied itself and it so had flooded a valley along this entire section. Because of the fact of the presence of this obstacle, it was forced to head northeast. So, in the whole section of the Lower Dalälven, the river did not have the time to flood a true valley. It thus had to adapt itself to the topology of the terrain, forming large fjärds with many isles in the flattest sections and by contrast a course narrower and faster at the different eskers encountered along the way.

== Natural environment ==
The park of Färnebofjärden is according to the classification of the WWF, situated in the terrestrial ecoregion of Sarmatic mixed forests, not far from the frontier of the Scandinavian and Russian taiga.

=== Plants ===
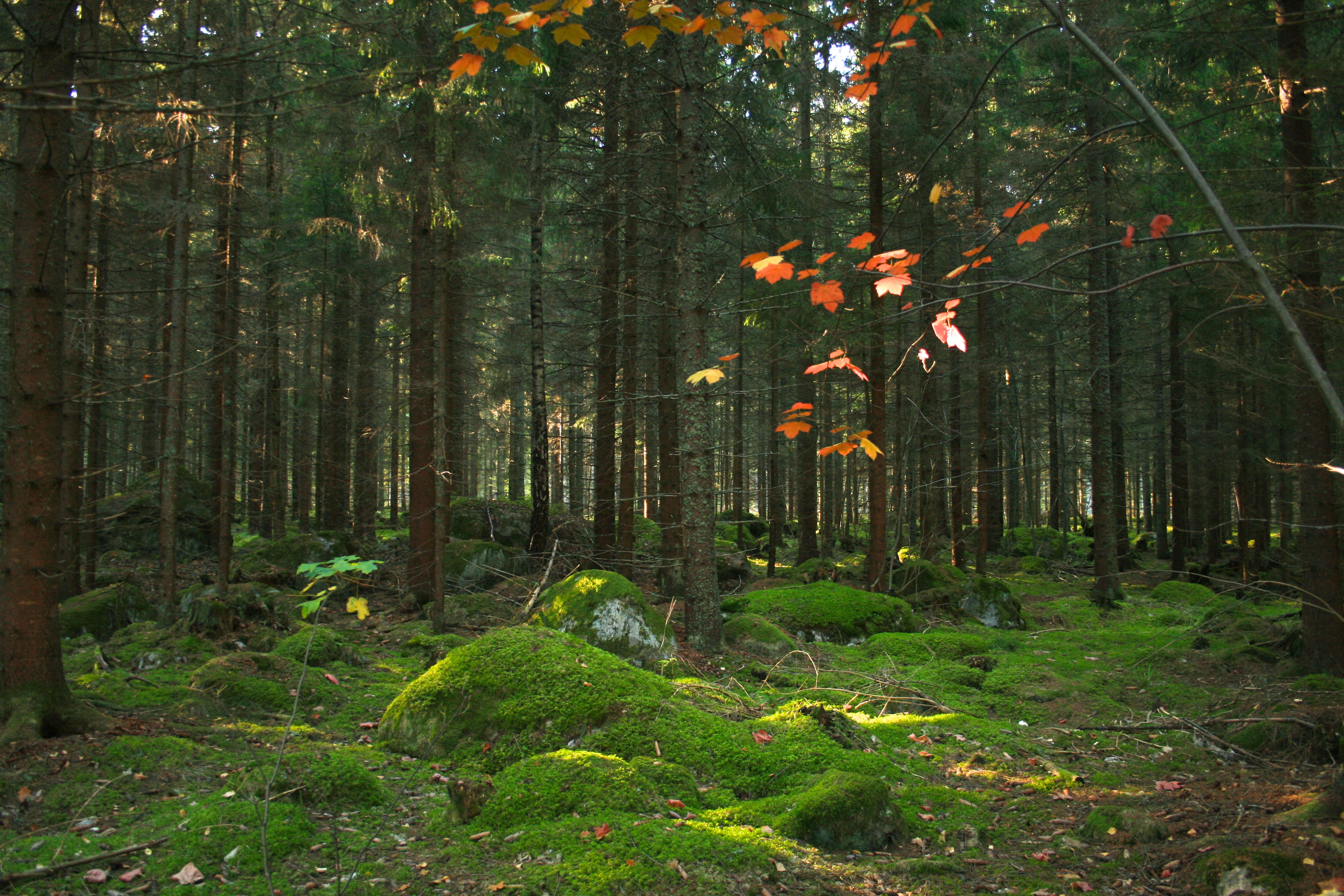
Coniferous forest on the isle of Mattön, in the northeast of the park

Almost all the types of forest of central Sweden are present in the park, which is due to both the presence of dry and wet environments and to the proximity of the Limes Norrlandicus line marking the frontier between the environments of the north and south. This implies the presence in the park of environments and species characteristic to both the North and the South of Sweden. A great number of endangered species appear in the park: two species of vascular plants, 25 species of mosses, 34 species of lichens and 22 species of fungi.

The park presents different environments as regards flora, the principal being the forests of conifers (1,000 ha (2,500 acres) making up 9.9% of the park), the mixed forests (1,460 ha (3,600 acres) making up 14.5% of the park), of open bogs (1,650 ha (4,100 acres) making up 16.3% of the park) and woods (500 ha (1,200 acres) making up 5% of the park) and finally wetlands (750 ha (1,900 acres) making up 7.4% of the park).

The forests of conifers, principally of Norway spruce, are in particular present in the south of the park, around Tinäset, on the isle of Torrön and the peninsula of Öbyhalvön. These forests have not been logged since the 1950s and certain trees are themselves over 120 years old. These old trees as well as the presence of dead wood give this forest a very ancient appearance, and contribute to a great richness of lichens and fungi. The soil is often covered in moss, the characteristic species being Hylocomium splendens, but Anastrophyllum hellerianum and Nowellia curvifolia are also common. One can also find European blueberries and lingonberries in the undergrowth.

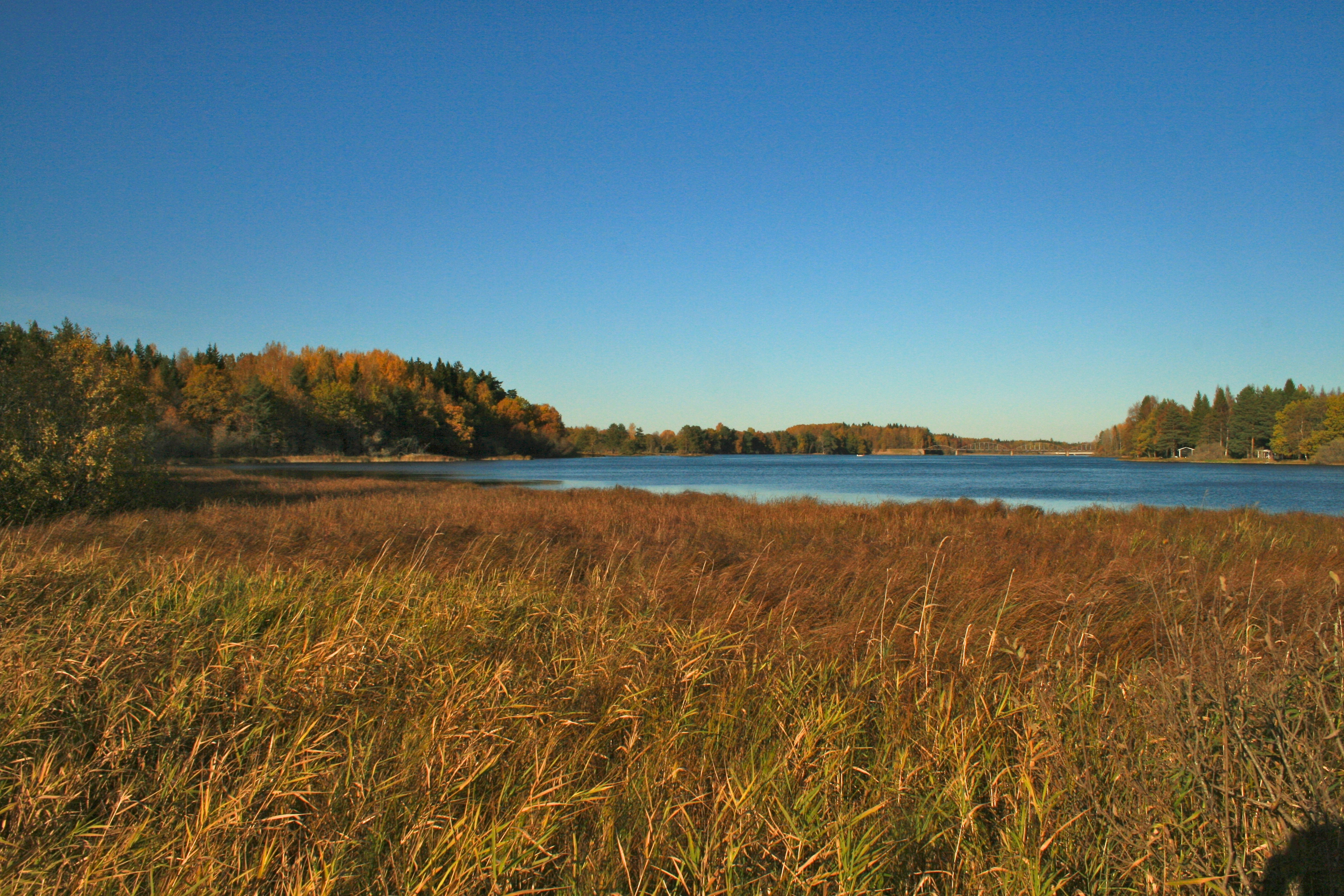
Wetlands on the isle of Mattön

In the zones most subject to inundations, conifers are more rare, since they do not like in general the wetter zones. In these forests, one can find broadleaf trees such as the aspen, very common in the Lower Dalälven, but rare in the rest of the country. These forests also have English oaks and small-leaved lindens and the wetter forests are mostly made up of alders, birch trees and willows. The richness of these forests and in particular their undergrowth depends above all on the nature of the soil. The poorer soils grow blueberries, bog bilberries, wild rosemary and cloudberry, whereas the richer soils are home in particular to Lily of the valley, woodland strawberries, purple small-reed and yellow loosestrife.

Where the floods are less frequent the hardwoods themselves are absent, giving way to open country. The country is thus a prairie and, sometimes, this prairie finishes by transforming into bog. The vegetation of the prairies is characterized by calamagrostides blanchâtres, by purple moor grass, bogbean, yellow loosestrife, swamp cinquefoil, lesser spearwort, common marsh-bedstraw, kingcup, purple loosestrife and violettes, the last being an endangered species in the country. In the bogs, vegetation is poor, with mainly bog myrtle, bog-rosemary, common cottongrass and species of Carex. The soil is often covered in peat mosses and other mosses.

=== Animals ===
==== Mammals ====
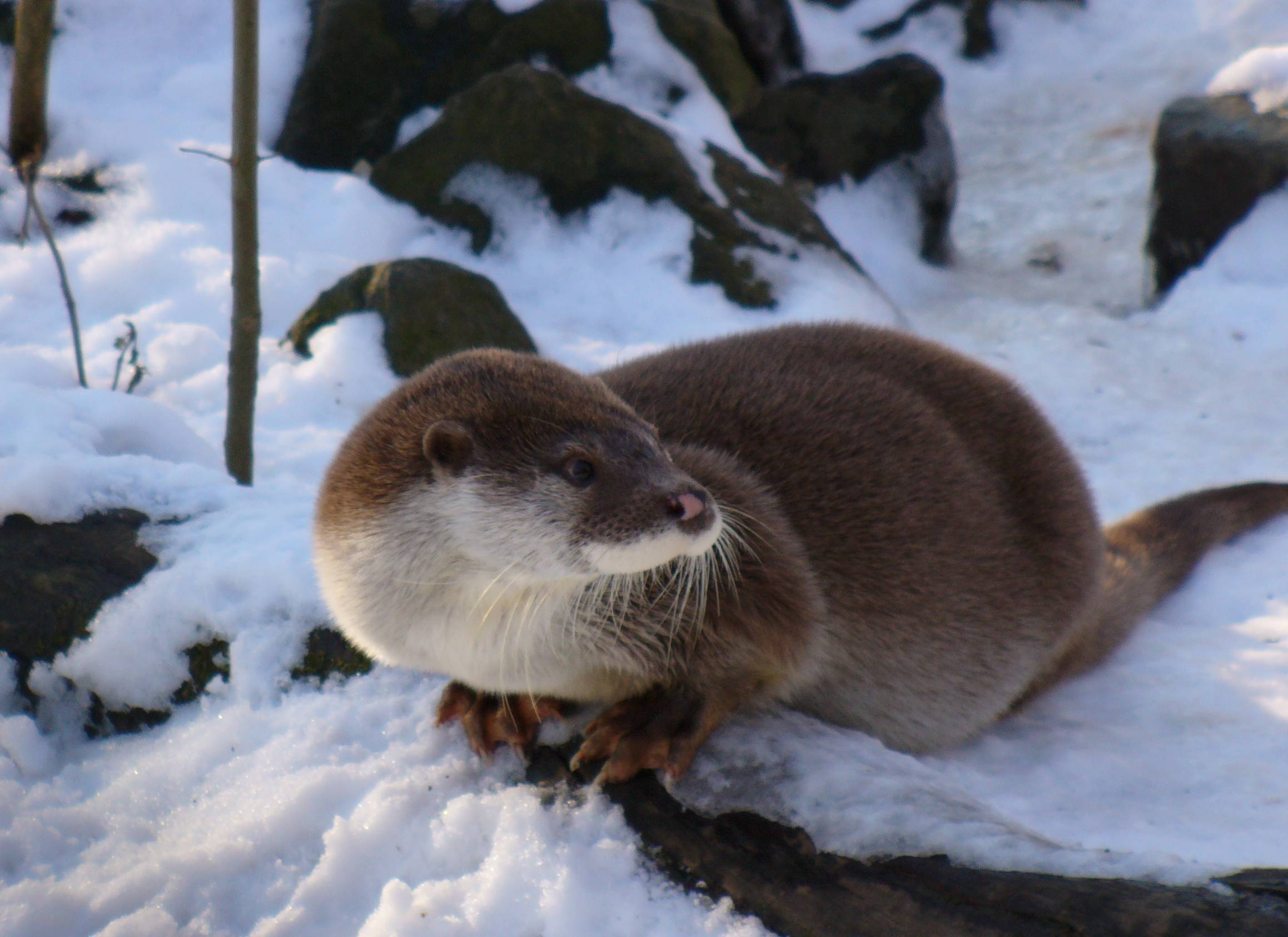
Otter in winter

The park is host to many species of mammals. The most widespread are the moose, the roe deer, the mountain hare, the red fox, and the European pine marten. Since the 1980s, one can also see Eurasian beaver near the islands of Torrön and Ängsön as well as near Gysinge. In 2008, it was similarly found that the wild boar was wont to settle the park. More rarely, one sees also the wood lemming in the north part of the park. Four species of mammals present in the park are considered endangered in Sweden. Thus, the Eurasian lynx can be observed regularly around Öbyhalvön, Tinäset and Gärdsvekarna, alongside brown bears and gray wolves, although these are less frequent. The three other endangered species are the European otter that one can see near the rapids, and two species of bats, the pond bat, very rare in Sweden) and the common noctule.

==== Birds ====
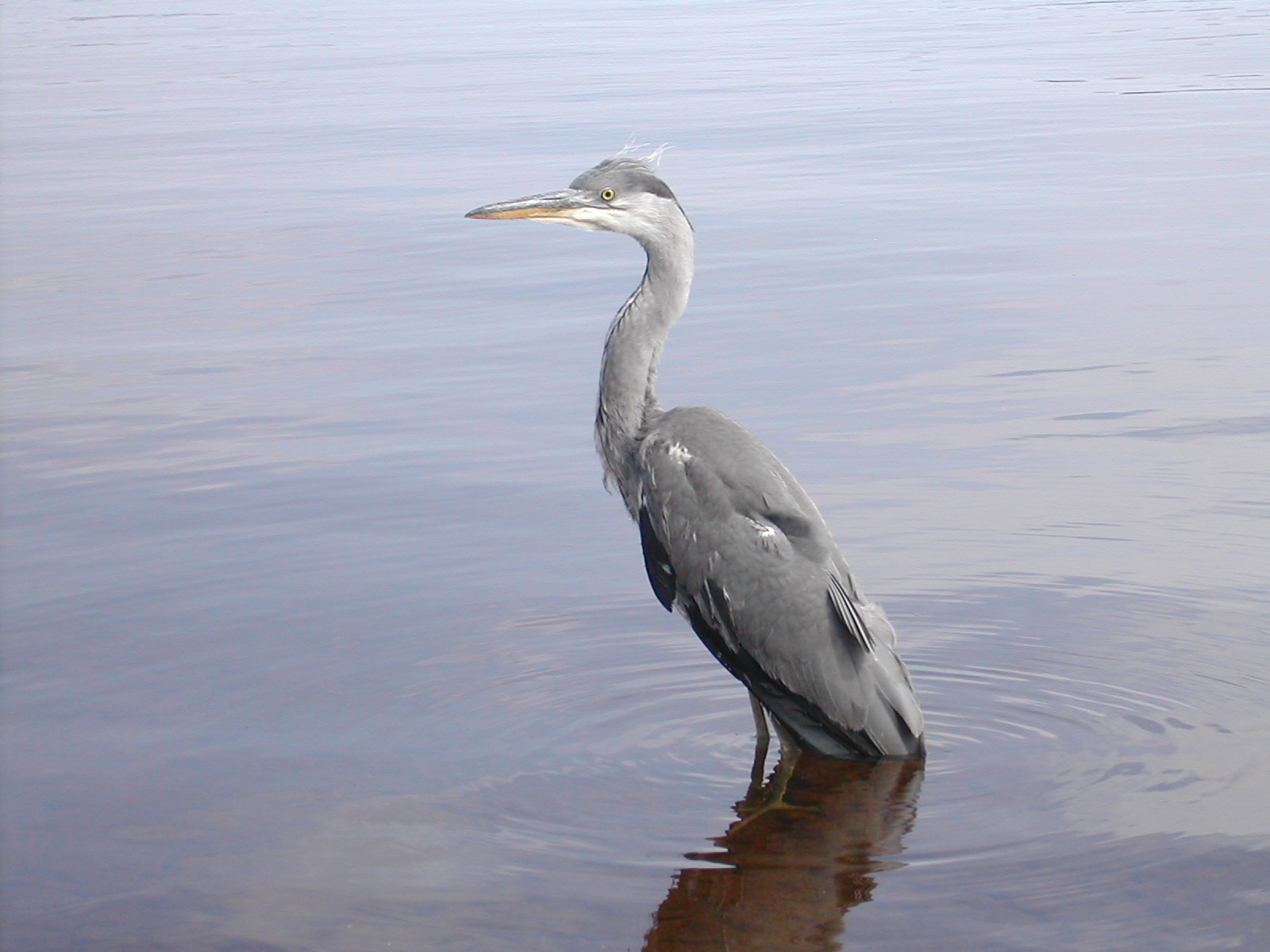
A heron in Färnebofjärden National Park

Birds are without question Färnebofjärden's most numerous class of animal. More than 200 species have been reported of which at least 107 nest regularly in the park. This richness is in part connected to the presence of characteristic species of both the south and the north. In addition, the park contains species of bird both aquatic and sylvan.

The park has a rich population of aquatic birds, attracted by the shallow, fish-rich waters. The proximity of big trees, especially pines, affords them good nesting opportunities. The most common species are the common gull, the common tern, the black-throated loon, and the mute swan . In the wetlands, one often finds the grey heron, the western capercaillie or even the common crane. One of the most notable aquatic species is the osprey, with thirty couples — probably one of the most important densities of the country. The white-tailed eagle, a species classified as endangered in the country, practically vanished from the park in the 1970s, but it is now returned.

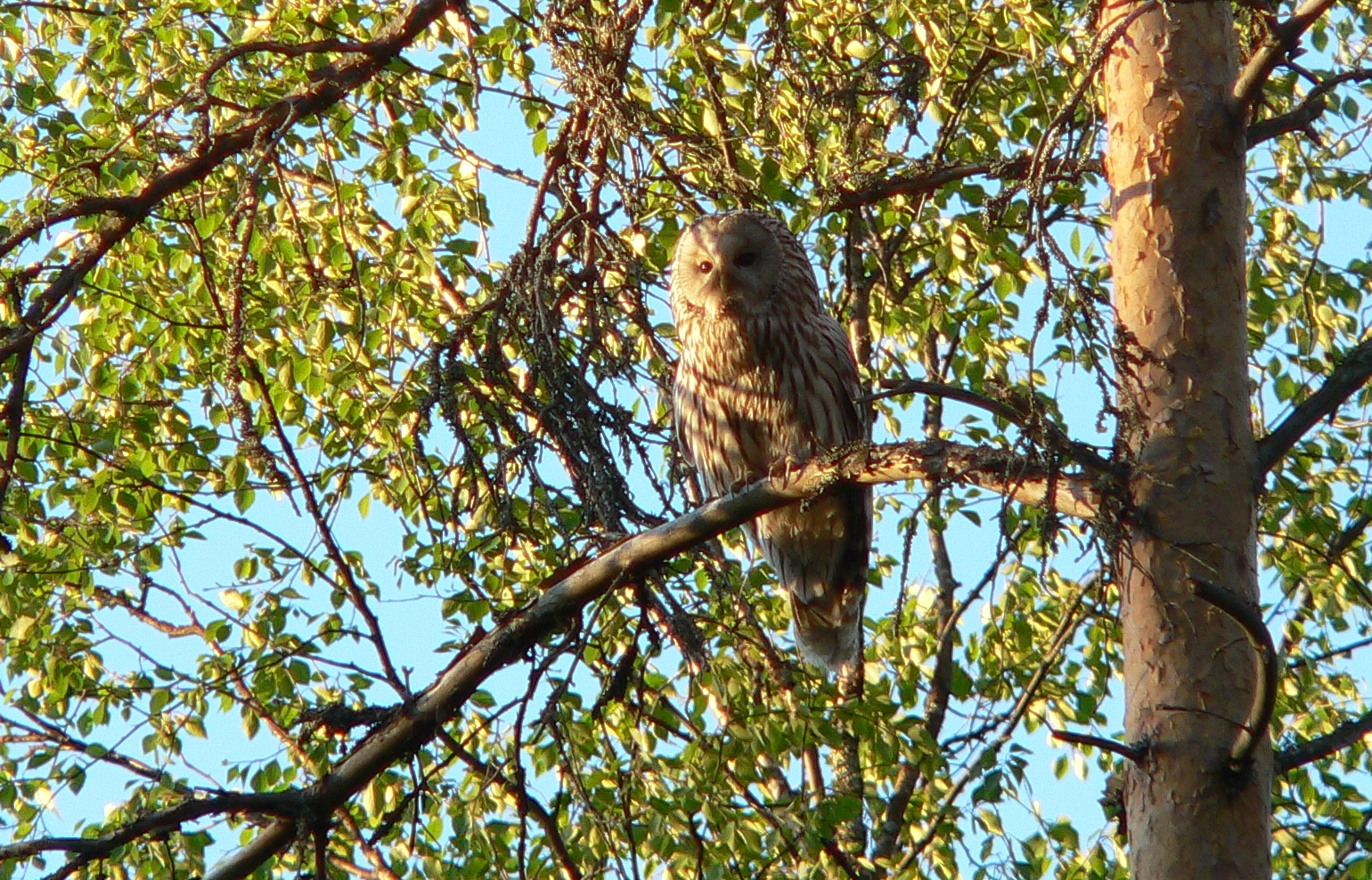
The Ural owl, symbol of the park

However, it is the forest species which are the most notable of the park, especially the woodpeckers and owls. Concerning woodpeckers, the great spotted woodpecker is the most common, but the black woodpecker, the European green woodpecker and the lesser spotted woodpecker are also themselves common. The population of white-backed woodpecker, a species classified as very endangered in Sweden with only 16 individuals in the whole country in 2004, has diminished in the park. Of 7 pairs observed in 1976, one sole individual was observed in 2003, and then a new couple in 2010. This species especially likes old forests with many dead trees and the species is thus a good indicator of the richness of the forest. In contrast, the grey-headed woodpecker is becoming more common. Regarding owls, the most common species are the Eurasian pygmy owl and the Ural owl. The latter is in addition the symbol of the park. Apart from these species, there are the common buzzard, the Eurasian hobby, or even, among others, the European honey buzzard.

==== Reptiles and amphibians ====
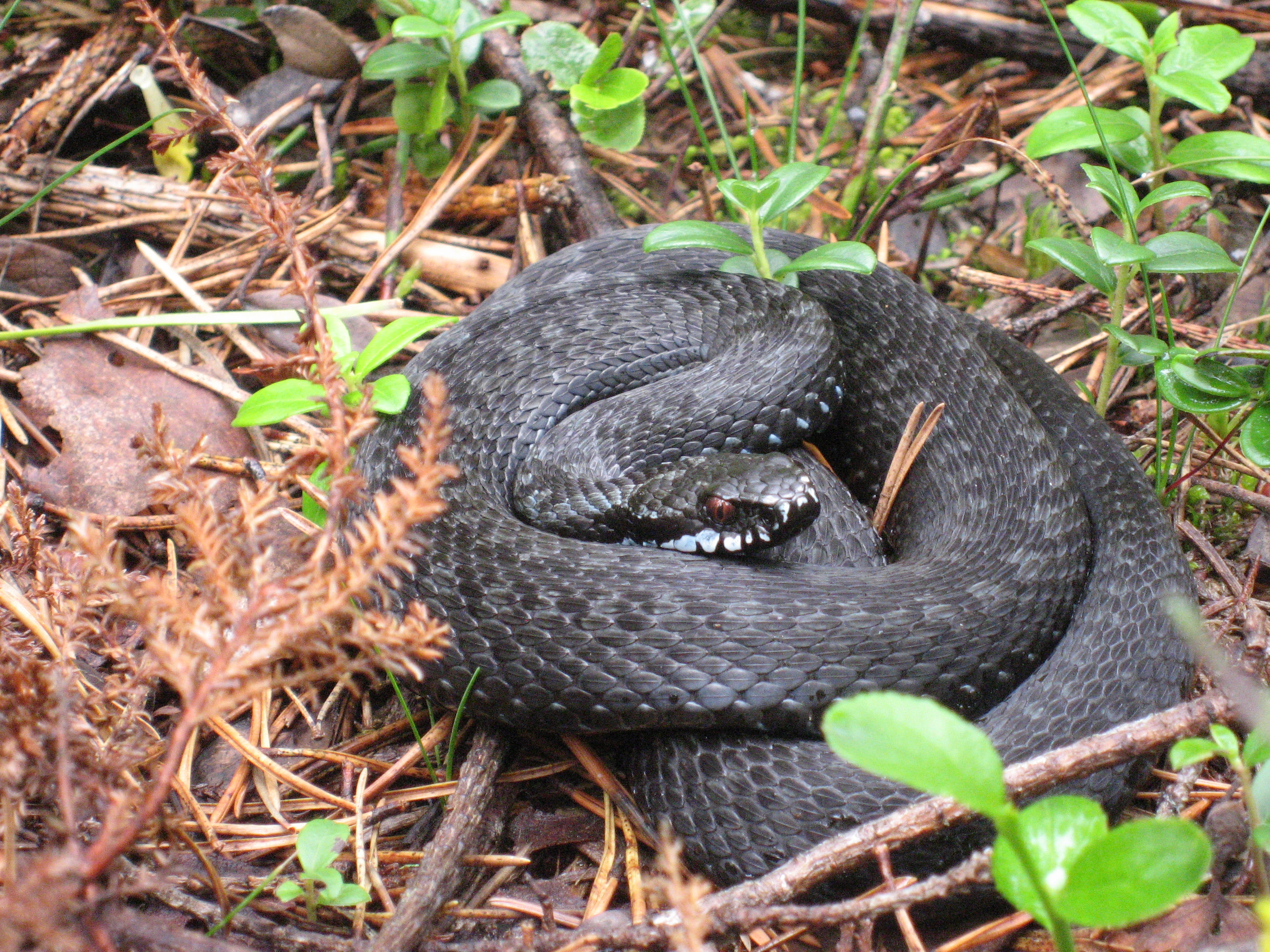
Adder in Färnebofjärden National Park

The park has all major Swedish species of amphibians. Among these species, one can number the common toad, the common frog and the moor frog, as well as the northern crested newt and the smooth newt. Among the reptiles, the most common species are two snakes, the common European adder and the grass snake, as well as the viviparous lizard and the slowworm.

==== Fish ====
The waters of the park are among Sweden's richest, which can be explained by a great number of factors, such as their optimal acidity, a great richness of nutrients, or even, among other things, the zones of rapids alternating with calmer zones. These waters permit the park have not only a great number of species, but also a great number of individual fish and certain fish of enormous size. Among the species present, one can name several species of cyprinids (the family of carp, minnows, barbs, barbels, and others), of which in particular the asp, rare in Sweden. The waters abound also with northern pike, with specimens weighing sometimes 20 kg (44 lb), with European perch, with zander, and with grayling — which species is classified as endangered in Sweden, much like the brown trout. The Atlantic salmon was also present in the park's waters, but the dams downstream have considerably reduced its possibilities of rejoining the park. The noble crayfish, a species endangered worldwide, was relatively common in the waters of the Dalälven, but has now almost disappeared; some catches in the park are however reported from time to time.

==== Insects ====
Only the insects of the forests have been reliably inventoried, but more than 70 species of insect are already inscribed on the list of species endangered in Sweden. The presence of dead wood favors the presence of numerous insects. Most of the forest insects live in the sapwood or between the sapwood and the bark. In particular, the Norway spruce and the English oak are the trees supporting the greatest richness in insects.

The species of insect most associated with the park and the Lower Dalälven in general are mosquitos of the genus Aedes. Indeed, the park's wetlands are enormously productive in mosquitos, especially during the heavy spring floods. The quantity of mosquitos in the Lower Dalälven has no equivalent in Sweden besides that in the vast wetlands of Lapland. This abundance bothers not only the park's tourists during the summer but also the entire region as far as Uppsala. Between 2002 and 2008, the insecticide Bacillus thuringiensis israelensis was used to try to regulate these populations, which needed a waiver, its use being forbidden in Sweden and contrary to the principles of the national park. However, the project was not renewed, this method not being considered a durable solution and some scientists arguing that the mosquitos make up part of the region's ecosystem.

== History ==
=== Initial settlements and agriculture ===
6000 years ago, the Lower Dalälven was a bay of the Littorina Sea, but as the land rose, the crests (eskers) became the best sites for the first permanent settlements. It was easy to nourish oneself, thanks to the river, and these places were the easiest to defend. In addition, the river was easier to cross at this point. In addition, it is atop the esker of Enköpingsåsen that one finds most of the prehistoric sites, and many of today's routes follow the trace of ancient routes along the eskers. Among the park's prehistoric sites, one can count the Stone Age sites at Trångnäs and Sandön and the cairns atop Hemön and Utön.

When sedentary agriculture developed in the region during the Bronze and Iron Ages, the slopes of the crests were again the favorite settlement sites, being easier to cultivate and above the floodplain. However, these wetlands were also used for haymaking, giving an important production of good quality. The hay was stocked in nearby barns and carried to the surrounding villages during the winter to feed the animals. Some of these barns are still visible near Torrösundet and atop Västerön. Woodlands were summer granting lands (transhumance) and some cabins (Fäbod) were constructed there in order to look after the animals during this time. Fifteen of these cabins are scattered in and around the park, mainly near Tinäset and south of Gysinge. Transhumance ceased at the beginning of the 20th century.

=== Industry ===
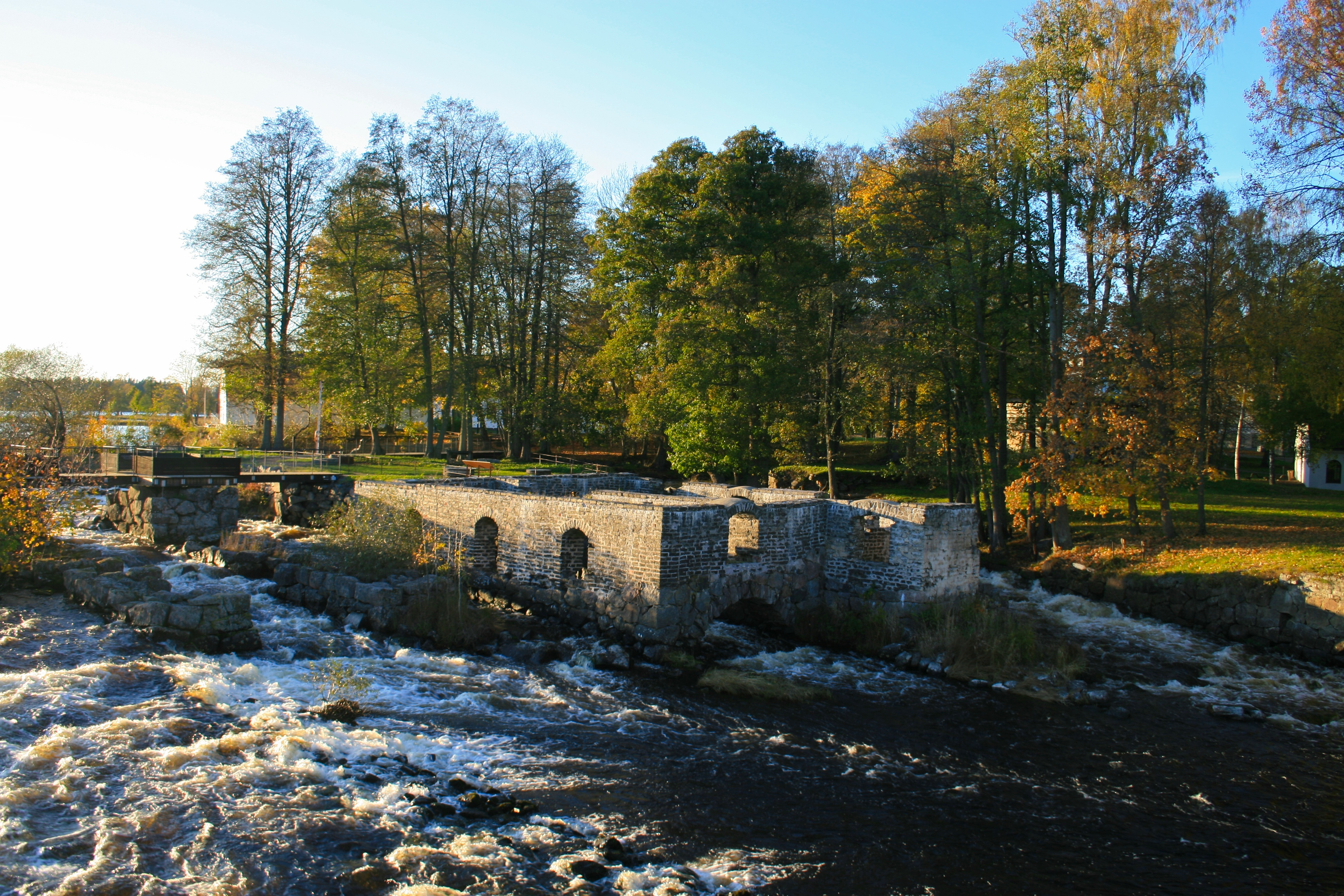
Ruins of a water-powered mill at Gysinge

One of the characteristics of the region that has strongly influenced the mode of life there ever since the Iron Age is its abundance of metals, in particular of iron. The settlers began then to combine agriculture with iron extraction. This exploitation has left numerous traces inside the park. Certain zones in the park were themselves used as extraction sites, such as Tinäset, where limonite was extracted from the marsh. The iron industry in the region necessitated a huge consumption of wood which initially justified silviculture in the park. Accordingly, the woods of Tinäset, for example, were heavily logged to feed the silver mine of Sala. At the end of the 19th century, many mills were constructed along the river: they were used for timber rafting. This activity ceased upon the creation of dams along the river. Gysinge has a timber rafting museum. The wettest forests largely escaped the logging industry, thereby serving as sanctuaries of biodiversity during this period of exploitation.

However, the most evident trace of the iron industry in the region is the forge of Gysinge. This forge was established in 1668 initially for the production of arms. The forge's location permitted a good access to metal, extracted at the mine of Dannemora, to wood and to the energy of the Gysinge rapids. The forge grew rapidly and in the 18th century there were constructed around the forge homes, mills, stables, a manor and even a hotel. In the 18th century, the forge was one of the largest in the country, with 50 people working at the mill proper, and 3000 people connected to the forge in other ways. The forge was also the first in the world to use an oven for induction, the oven Kjellin. The forge closed at the beginning of the 20th century.

A hydroelectric plant was constructed at Gysinge in 1917, but it consists only of one small scale plant, using one deflection of a small part of the river.

=== Protection ===
The Lower Dalälven has for a long time been recognized in Sweden as a remarkable site worthy of protection. In the 1960s, the Swedish Society for Nature Conservation engaged itself for the protection of Färnebofjärden, in particular the area of Tinäset, and made many inventories in the area. At the beginning of the 1970s, Stora AB tried to clear all the forests it owned in the northern part of Tinäset. In response the ornithologist Stig Holmstedt made contact with the Swedish nature conservation society and formed a group to work towards the protection of the zone, which led to the formation of a proposition for a national park in 1975. Only the commune of Sandviken took up the idea and formed the same year the nature reserve of Gysinge. In the following years, the geomorphology, fauna and flora of the Lower Dalälven were systematically inventoried. This began at the formulation of a protection plan by Naturvårdsverket and the concerned counties. In 1989, in the first directive for the creation of national parks established by Naturvårdsverket, Färnebofjärden was proposed as a future national park. In 1997, Färnebofjärden is proposed on the list of the Ramsar Convention, and, finally, the national park was established by the king on 10 September 1998. The motive for creating the park was "to preserve a unique fluvial landscape as well as rich forests and surrounding wetlands in a relatively intact state". It thus includes a large part of the old reserve of Gysinge, which accordingly was reformed in 1999 with all the zones not included in the park. On 19 November 2001, the park was finally added to the Ramsar list. It is also included in the Natura 2000 Network. In 2011, the Lower Dalälven was classified as a biosphere reserve by UNESCO under the name country of the river Nedre Dalälven.

== Management and administration ==
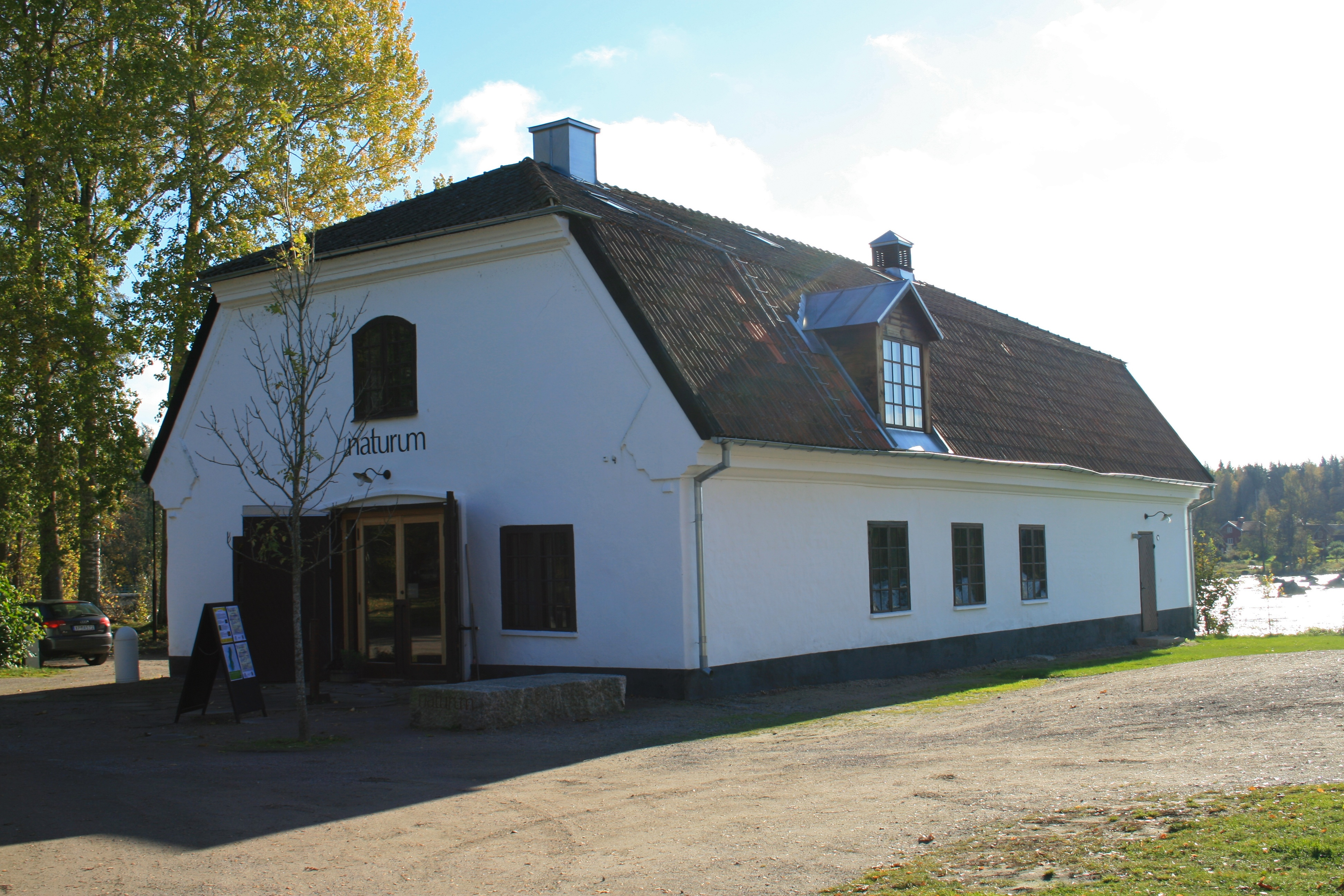
Gävleborg County is responsible for the park's visitor center

Like most of the Swedish national parks, the management and administration are divided between the Swedish environmental protection agency and the administrative council of the counties. Naturvårdsverket is charged with the proposal of new national parks, through consultation with administrative councils of the counties and municipalities; a vote of the Riksdag endorses their creation. If a park is approved, the state buys the land, through the intermediary of the Naturvårdsverket. The management of the park is then principally in the hands of the county. Despite the fact that the park of Färnebofjärden spans the territories of four counties, only the administrative council of Västmanland is responsible for the management of the park. In contrast, park's nature center is led by Gävleborg, since it is situated on Gävleborg's territory.

The management work for the park includes the maintenance of tourism structures (such as trails, cabins), as well as the maintenance of certain meadows. If appropriate, the park authorities can regulate the beaver population, which is capable of harming the forest. Elk, deer, and American mink hunting is allowed for population regulation purposes, but is forbidden between 1 January and 15 August. To protect the birds, access to certain zones can be forbidden during nesting season, from 1 January to 15 June. These fixed zones have been replaced in 2015 by the possibility of creating temporary zones permitting themselves to adapt to zones where the most vulnerable species are found. The ban on commercial activity has also been lifted. Finally, the speed limit for boats was lowered from 12 to 7 knots except for certain sections where the maximum speed is capped at 12 or 20 knots.

== Tourism ==
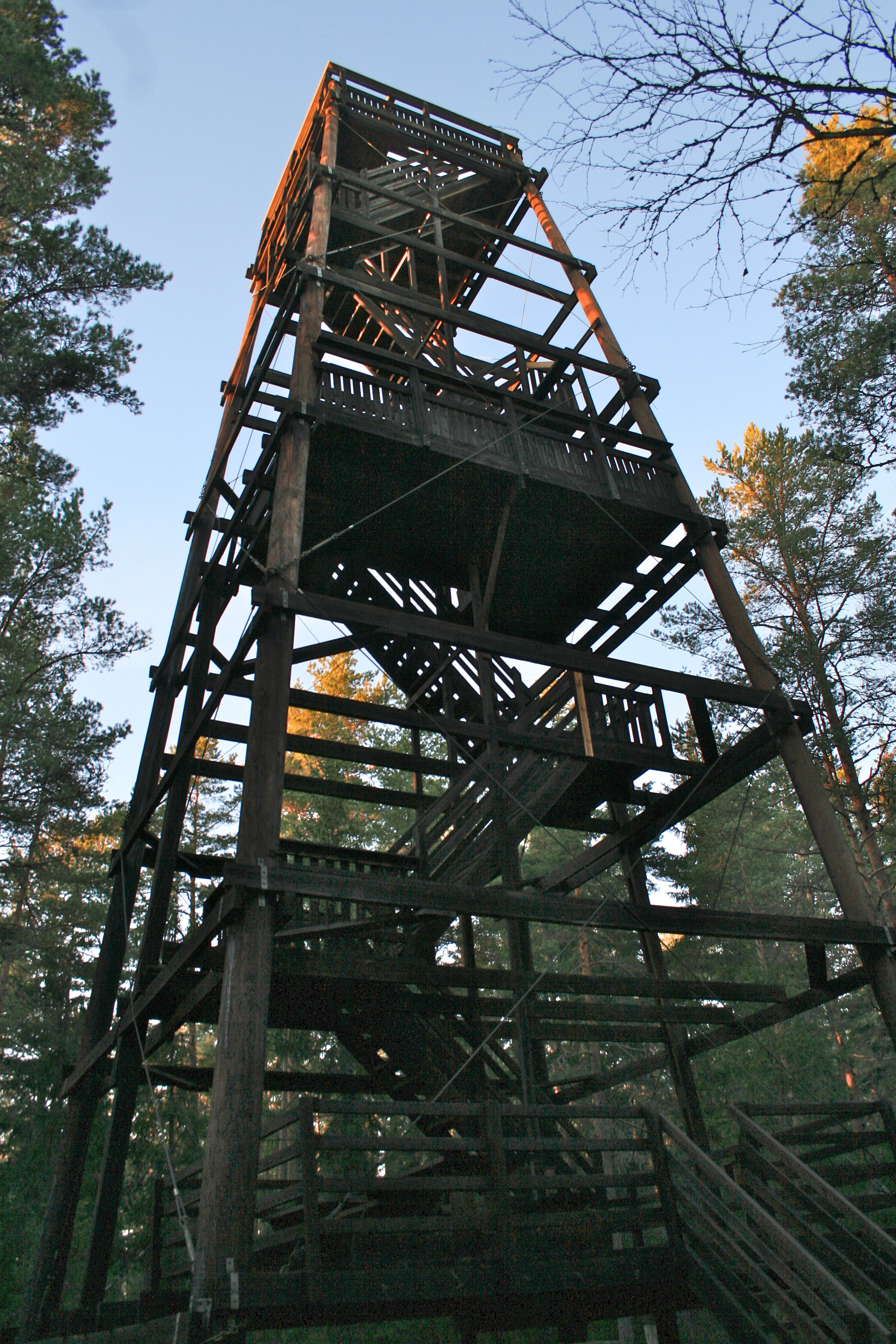
The observation tower offers an exceptional view over the park

The park and the surrounding zones attract many tourists. In addition, the Gysinge forge is visited annually by 250,000 people — a figure rapidly growing, the peninsula of Östa by 75,000 people and Tyttbo by 10,000 people. However, these visits are in general highly localized.

The main entrances of the park are at Gysinge and Sevedskvarn, both situated near national route 56. These entries have parking. Camp grounds exist at Östa, Tyttbo and Österfärnebo, and it is also possible to stay at Gysinge forge's hotel (Gysinge bruk Wärdshus). Inside the park itself, many cabins are available for passing the night, many of them ancient shepherd cabins.

The principal activities inside the park in summer are sport fishing as well as boat or canoe trips. Navigation by boat is in fact one of the best ways to explore the park, and the island of Sandön is particularly popular. The park also attracts many bird watchers in winter and spring, especially near Tinäset where the birdlife is the richest. However, the part of the road that enabled one to get there was closed because it traversed the park — which closing was decided during the park's creation. As a result, the number of tourists at this location diminished considerably. A visitor, information, and nature center was built inside an old barn (dating from 1814) of the Gysinge forge. At Skekarsbo, an observation tower 20 metres (66 ft) in height was constructed in 1995 and offers a panoramic view over the major part of the park. Several hiking trails exist inside the park, in particular in the north part: on the isle of Mattön (between Gysinge and Sevedskvarn), a part of Gästrikeleden across the park from Gysinge, and from Kyrkstigen up to Skekarsbo. In the southern part, a long trail leads to Tinäset.
