= Alvik (disambiguation) =

Alvik may refer to:

- Alvik, residential district in Stockholm, Sweden
- Alvik, Leksand, locality situated in Leksand Municipality, Dalarna County, Sweden
- Alvik, Luleå Municipality, locality situated in Luleå Municipality, Norrbotten County, Sweden

== See also ==
- Ålvik
