= Leksand Municipality =

Leksand Municipality Leksands kommun
- Municipality
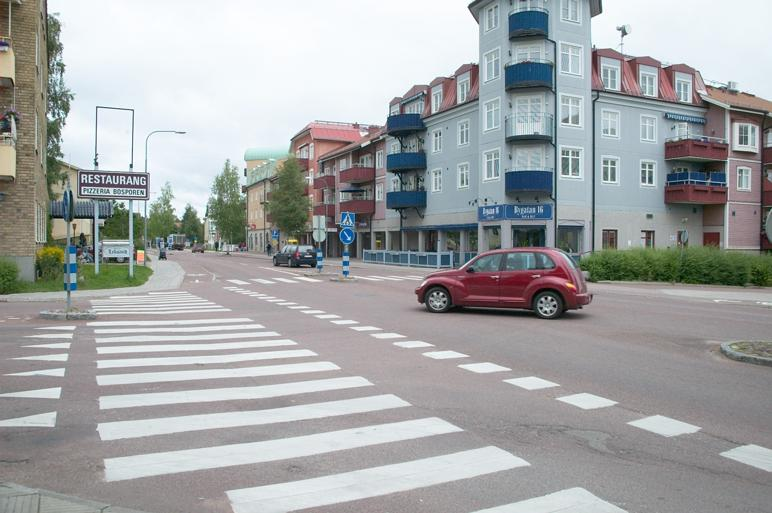

- Coat of arms

- Coordinates: 60°44′N 15°0′E
- Country: Sweden
- County: Dalarna County
- Seat: Leksand

Area
  - Total: 1,411.9579 km^{2} (545.1600 sq mi)
  - Land: 1,221.2279 km^{2} (471.5187 sq mi)
  - Water: 190.73 km^{2} (73.64 sq mi)
- Area as of 1 January 2014.

Population (30 June 2025)
  - Total: 16,173
  - Density: 13.243/km^{2} (34.300/sq mi)
- Time zone: UTC+1 (CET)
  - Summer (DST): UTC+2 (CEST)
- ISO 3166 code: SE
- Province: Dalarna
- Municipal code: 2029
- Website: www.leksand.se
- Density is calculated using land area only.

Leksand Municipality (Swedish: Leksands kommun) is a municipality in Dalarna County in central Sweden. Its seat is located in the town of Leksand.

In 1974 "old" Leksand was amalgamated with Ål and reunited with Siljansnäs (which had been separated from it in 1875).

== Geography ==
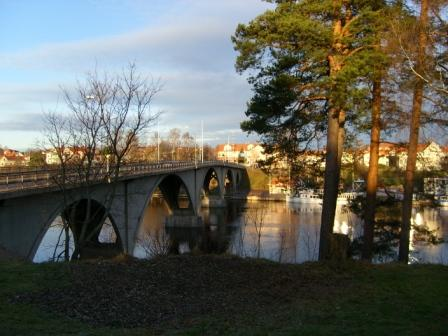
Bridge over Österdal River

The municipality is located alongside the Österdalälven, (Österdal River), and the town is at the southern shore of lake Siljan.

The culture is marked by being in the heart of the culture rich Dalarna. There is a substantial old town section in Leksand, with preserved old cottages as a landmark.

=== Localities ===
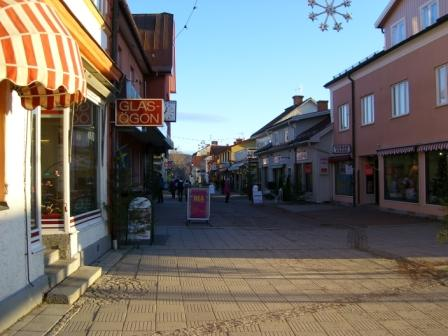
Norsgatan

- Alvik
- Djura
- Häradsbygden
- Insjön
- Leksand (seat)
- Siljansnäs
- Tällberg
- Västanvik

== Demographics ==
This is a demographic table based on Leksand Municipality's electoral districts in the 2022 Swedish general election sourced from SVT's election platform, in turn taken from SCB official statistics.

In total there were 15,995 residents, including 12,738 Swedish citizens of voting age. 47.2 % voted for the left coalition and 51.6 % for the right coalition. Indicators are in percentage points except population totals and income.

Location	Residents	Citizen adults	Left vote	Right vote	Employed	Swedish parents	Foreign heritage	Income SEK	Degree
Location			%	%					
Edshult-Åkerö-Övermo	2,112	1,623	46.6	52.7	86	92	8	27,059	45
Häradsbygden-Heden	1,949	1,585	47.9	51.0	88	95	5	25,129	38
Insjön V - Ål-Kilen	1,235	941	40.1	57.7	79	84	16	23,468	27
Insjön Ö	1,542	1,184	42.6	55.8	83	89	11	24,351	33
Leksand V	2,284	1,753	44.8	54.2	82	84	16	26,457	42
Leksand Ö	1,456	1,158	52.3	46.6	86	94	6	25,000	45
Leksandsnoret	1,753	1,468	54.6	44.7	76	77	23	20,236	30
Siljansnäs	1,858	1,496	46.4	51.8	83	92	8	23,005	41
Tällberg	1,806	1,530	46.3	52.8	84	92	8	25,187	40
Source: SVT

== Economy ==
Most companies are small enterprises, covering several sectors. To the larger belong:

- Clas Ohlson (Sweden's largest department store chain, which was founded in Insjön)
- Leksandsbröd (Swedish crispbread)
- Bergkvist-Insjön (Wood factory)
- Tomoku Hus (Houses for export to Japan)
- Leksands IF (Sport organization)
- Ejendals

In the 2002 list of Swedish Industry Climate, Leksand Municipality was ranked 15 of 289 investigated municipalities.

== Riksdag elections ==
Year	%	Votes	V	S	MP	C	L	KD	M	SD	NyD	Left	Right
1973	89.5	8,329	1.9	36.5		40.0	8.8	2.9	9.7			38.4	58.4
1976	90.7	8,977	2.0	35.2		38.3	10.0	2.7	11.7			37.2	60.0
1979	89.7	7,202	2.5	35.6		30.9	8.9	2.9	18.5			38.1	58.4
1982	90.3	9,522	2.5	37.6	1.9	27.7	5.4	3.5	21.3			40.2	54.5
1985	88.8	9,561	2.9	36.8	1.7	25.3	13.2		19.9			39.8	58.5
1988	85.3	9,172	3.5	35.5	6.2	21.4	11.1	7.4	14.7			45.3	47.2
1991	85.7	9,690	3.1	31.9	3.4	15.1	8.2	11.8	18.2		7.4	35.0	53.3
1994	86.3	9,994	5.4	38.6	7.6	13.0	5.9	7.7	20.2		0.9	51.6	46.8
1998	82.3	9,584	11.7	30.8	6.1	8.9	2.8	18.1	19.3			48.6	49.2
2002	80.5	9,428	7.7	34.9	4.8	14.1	10.2	13.1	12.5	0.8		47.4	49.9
2006	82.9	9,834	4.8	31.3	4.9	13.6	5.0	10.5	16.6	2.9		41.0	54.6
2010	85.0	10,245	4.2	28.9	6.5	9.4	5.3	8.8	31.4	4.0		39.6	54.9
2014	87.5	10,584	4.9	29.4	5.8	10.0	3.8	7.4	23.7	11.8		40.1	44.9
2018	89.5	10,944	7.0	26.1	3.7	12.9	3.6	9.5	19.6	16.2		49.7	48.9

== Notability ==
One of Sweden's most popular ice hockey teams is Leksands IF. NHL goalkeeper Johan Hedberg hails from Leksand. In addition, one of Sweden's best baseball teams (Leksand Lumberjacks) plays in Leksand. Along with Mora, Leksand co-hosted the 2007 World Junior Ice Hockey Championships. The European Go Congress was held in Leksand in 2008.

== Twin towns – sister cities ==
Leksand is twinned with:

- Aurora, Canada
- Brainerd, United States
- Hørsholm, Denmark
- Karksi-Nuia (Mulgi), Estonia
- Lillehammer, Norway
- Oulainen, Finland
- Tōbetsu, Japan
