= Näs =

Näs or Nääs may refer to:

- Näs bruk,
- Näs Castle,
- Nääs Castle and
- a hundred in Värmland
