= Siljansnäs =

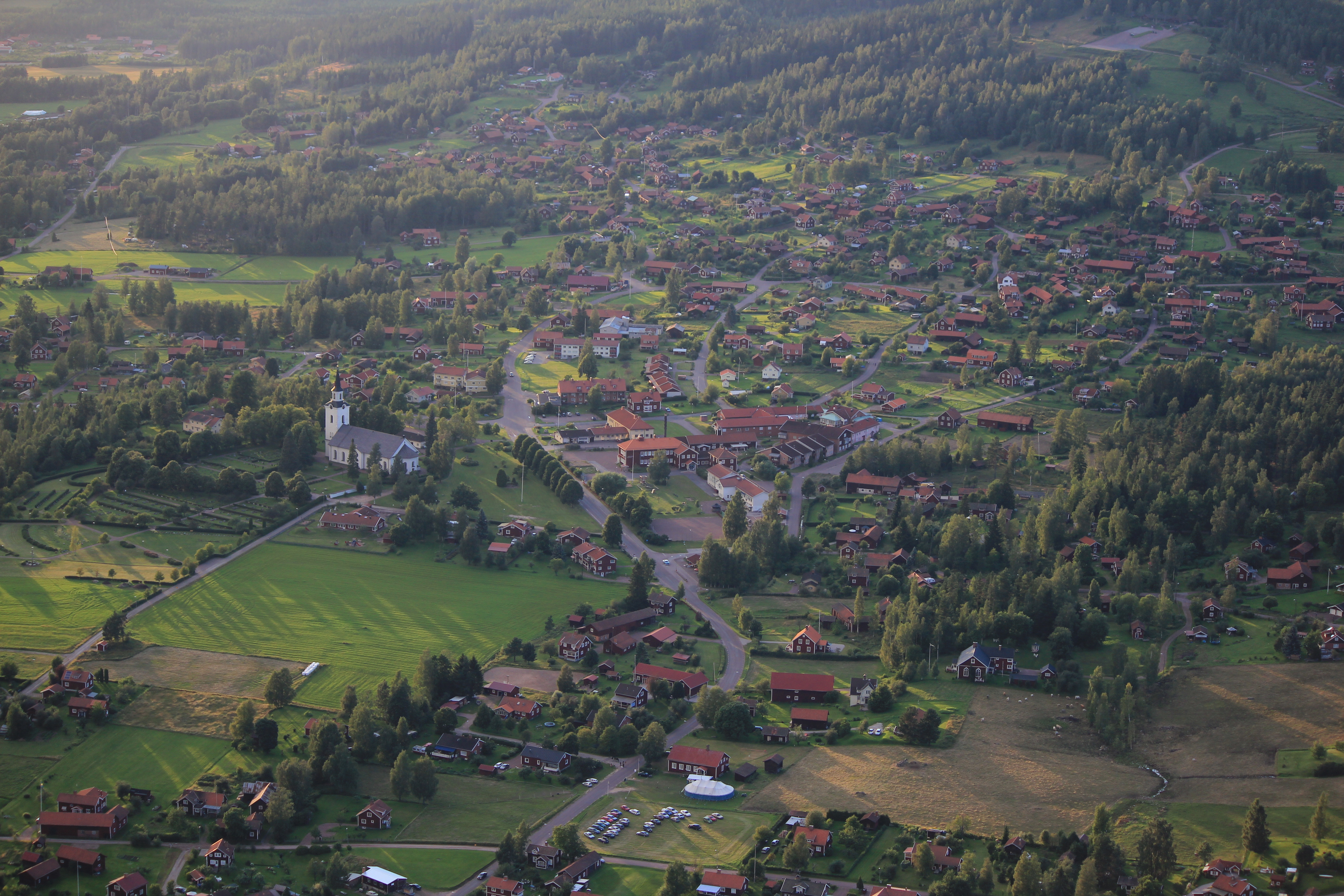

- Location within Dalarna Location within Sweden
- Coordinates: 60°47′N 14°51′E
- Country: Sweden
- Province: Dalarna
- County: Dalarna County
- Municipality: Leksand Municipality

Area
  - Total: 3.81 km^{2} (1.47 sq mi)

Population (31 December 2010)
  - Total: 1,268
  - Density: 333/km^{2} (860/sq mi)
- Time zone: UTC+1 (CET)
  - Summer (DST): UTC+2 (CEST)

Siljansnäs is a locality situated in Leksand Municipality, Dalarna County, Sweden with 1,268 inhabitants in 2010.
