= Österdal River =

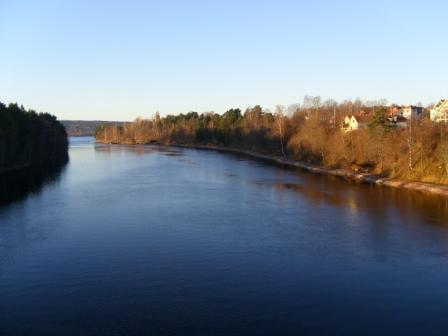
- Österdal River seen from Leksand, view over Lake Siljan
- Native name: Österdalälven (Swedish)

Location
- Country: Sweden

Physical characteristics
- Mouth
  - location: Djurås
  - coordinates: 60°33′N 15°08′E
- Length: 300 km (190 mi)
- Basin size: 12,430 km^{2} (4,800 sq mi)

Österdalälven (literally East Dal River) is a 300-kilometre (190 mi) long river in Sweden that flows southeast through Dalarna. Its sources are Storån, Grövlan and Sörälven and the end point is Djurås, in the municipality of Gagnef, where it connects with Västerdalälven to form Dalälven. Österdalälven flows through the Trängslet Dam and Siljan.
