= Västanvik =

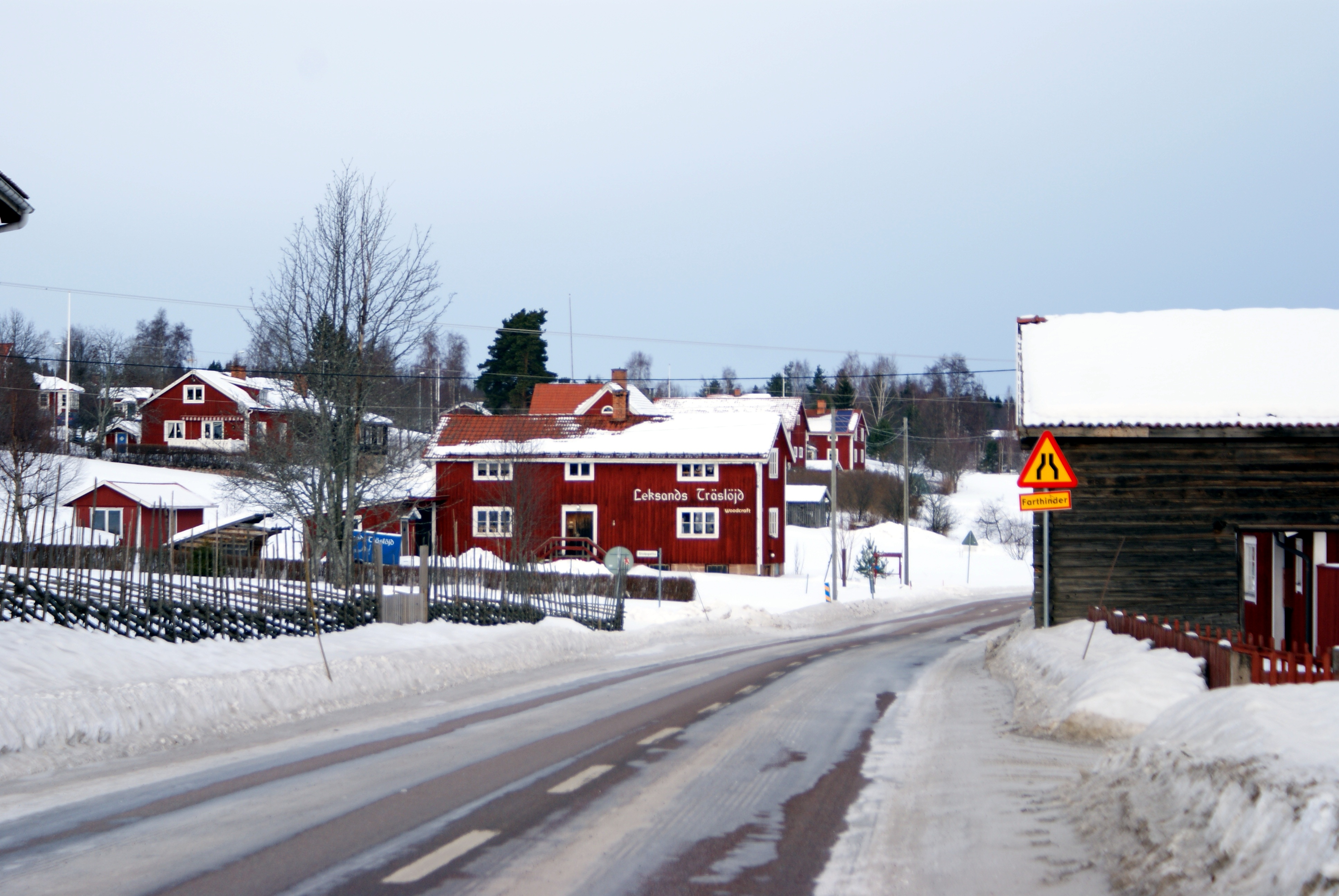
- Västanvik in January 2011

- Location within Dalarna Location within Sweden
- Coordinates: 60°44′N 14°57′E
- Country: Sweden
- Province: Dalarna
- County: Dalarna County
- Municipality: Leksand Municipality

Area
  - Total: 1.46 km^{2} (0.56 sq mi)

Population (31 December 2010)
  - Total: 385
  - Density: 263/km^{2} (680/sq mi)
- Time zone: UTC+1 (CET)
  - Summer (DST): UTC+2 (CEST)

Västanvik is a locality situated in Leksand Municipality, Dalarna County, Sweden with 385 inhabitants in 2010.
