= Häradsbygden =

- Location within Dalarna Location within Sweden
- Coordinates: 60°42′N 15°02′E
- Country: Sweden
- Province: Dalarna
- County: Dalarna County
- Municipality: Leksand Municipality

Area
  - Total: 1.45 km^{2} (0.56 sq mi)

Population (31 December 2010)
  - Total: 643
  - Density: 444/km^{2} (1,150/sq mi)
- Time zone: UTC+1 (CET)
  - Summer (DST): UTC+2 (CEST)

Häradsbygden is a locality situated in Leksand Municipality, Dalarna County, Sweden with 643 inhabitants in 2010.
