= Djura =

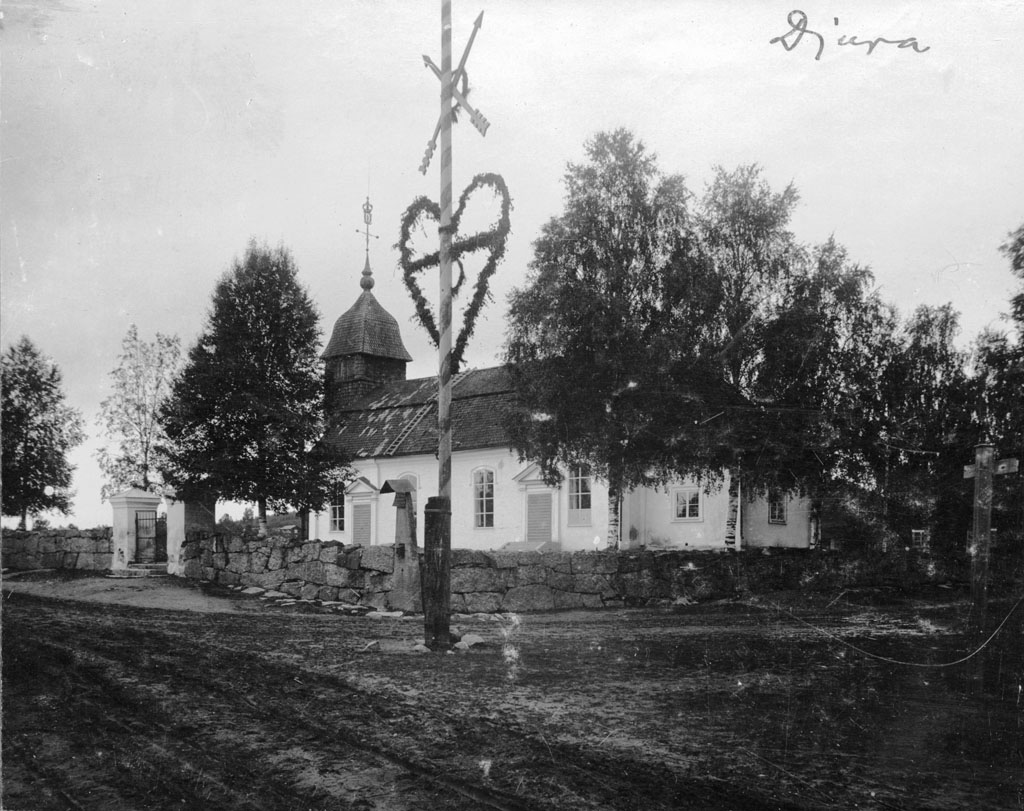
- Djura Church, c.1900

- Location within Dalarna Location within Sweden
- Coordinates: 60°37′N 15°00′E
- Country: Sweden
- Province: Dalarna
- County: Dalarna County
- Municipality: Leksand Municipality

Area
  - Total: 0.83 km^{2} (0.32 sq mi)
- Elevation: 173 m (568 ft)

Population (31 December 2010)
  - Total: 364
  - Density: 438/km^{2} (1,130/sq mi)
- Time zone: UTC+1 (CET)
  - Summer (DST): UTC+2 (CEST)

Djura is a locality situated in Leksand Municipality, Dalarna County, Sweden with 364 inhabitants in 2010.
