= Trängslet Dam =

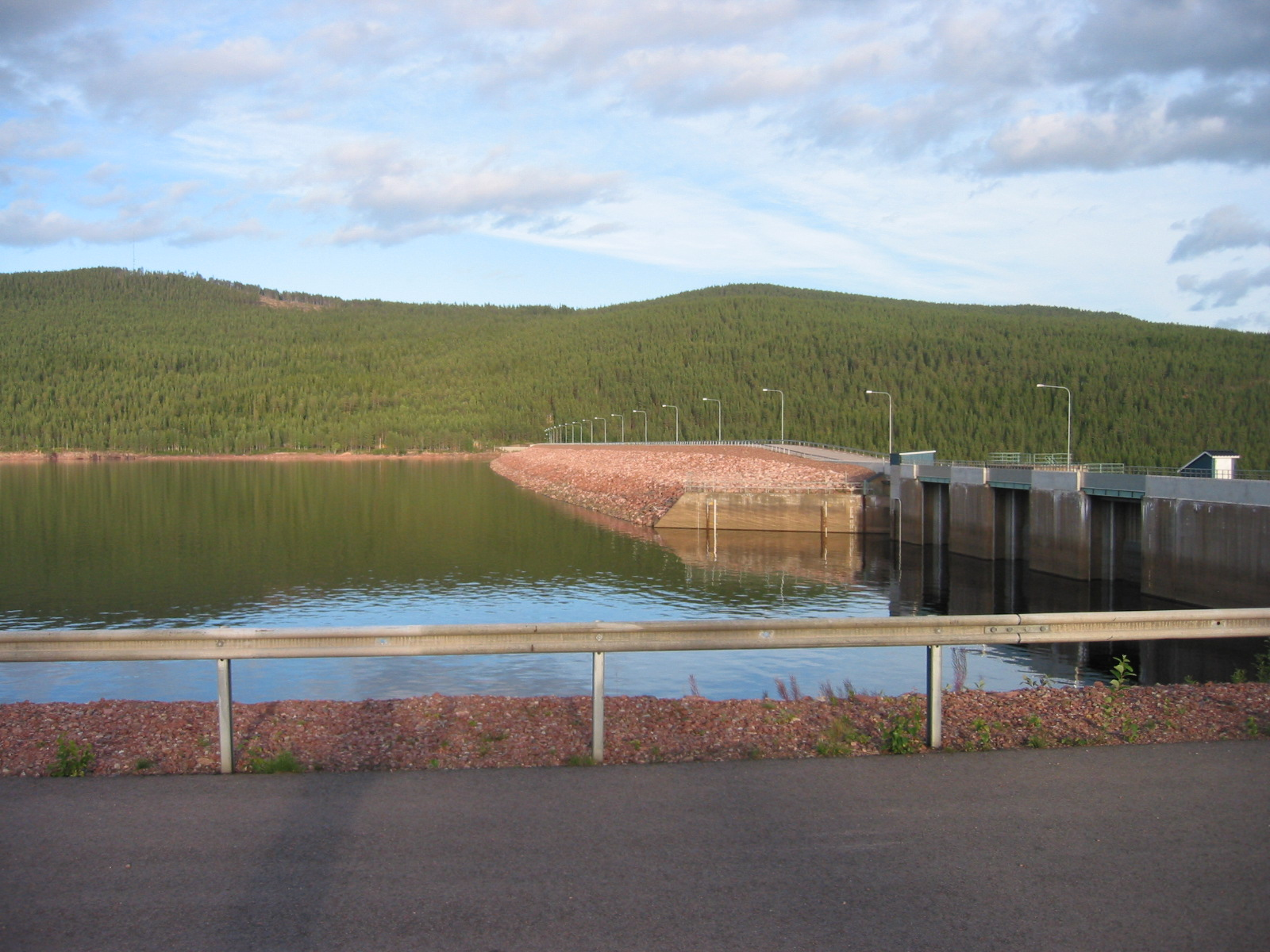
- Reservoir behind the dam

- Location within Sweden
- Country: Sweden
- Location: Trängslet, Dalarna
- Coordinates: 61°22′52.62″N 13°43′52.03″E
- Purpose: Power
- Status: Operational
- Construction began: 1955
- Opening date: 1960; 66 years ago
- Owner: Fortum

Dam and spillways
- Type of dam: Embankment, rock-fill
- Impounds: Dal River
- Height: 125 m (410 ft)
- Length: 890 m (2,920 ft)

Reservoir
- Total capacity: 880,000,000 m^{3} (710,000 acre⋅ft)

Dalälven Hydroelectric Power Station
- Commission date: 1960
- Hydraulic head: 142 m (466 ft)
- Turbines: 1 x 130 MW, 2 x 100 MW Francis-type
- Installed capacity: 330 MW
- Annual generation: 680 GWh

The Trängslet Dam is a rock-filled embankment dam on the Dal River near the town of Trängslet in Dalarna, Sweden. At 125 m (410 ft) in height, it is the tallest dam in the country. Its reservoir, with a capacity of 880,000,000 m^{3} (710,000 acre⋅ft), is also the largest artificial lake in Sweden. The dam was constructed between 1955 and 1960. Its hydroelectric power station has an installed capacity of 330 MW. It is owned by Fortum.

== See also ==
- List of power stations in Sweden
