= Leksand =

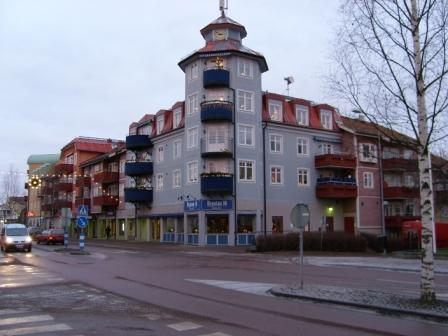
- Central Leksand

- Location within Dalarna Location within Sweden
- Coordinates: 60°44′N 15°00′E
- Country: Sweden
- Province: Dalarna
- County: Dalarna County
- Municipality: Leksand Municipality

Area
  - Total: 7.79 km^{2} (3.01 sq mi)

Population (31 December 2010)
  - Total: 5,934
  - Density: 761/km^{2} (1,970/sq mi)
- Time zone: UTC+1 (CET)
  - Summer (DST): UTC+2 (CEST)

Leksand (Swedish pronunciation: [ˈlɛ̂kːsand]) is a locality and the seat of Leksand Municipality in Dalarna County, Sweden, with 5,934 inhabitants in 2010. Leksand is situated on the southern branch of lake Siljan, where it flows into river Österdalälven.

== Sport ==
Leksand is famous for the Leksands IF ice hockey team, who have won four Swedish Championships.

Leksand is also home to the Leksands Baseball and Softball Club, the oldest and one of the more successful baseball clubs in Sweden, having won 20 national championships in baseball and 7 in softball. The club was founded in the late 1950s and currently has about 130 members. Additionally, Leksand is home to the Baseball Academy Leksand, a Major League Baseball (MLB)-sponsored academy established in 2006. The academy is part of a broader drive by MLB to develop European talent through a system of baseball academies across the continent, and is the only such academy in Sweden. As of March 2010, Baseball Academy Leksand comprised 22 Swedish players and was managed by Tony Klarberg.

== Climate ==
Leksand has a humid continental climate (Köppen Dfb). The influence of the Siljan lake is relatively minor on the local climate due to its modest size and freezing over every winter. However, some potential for lake-effect snow causing excessive accumulation is possible when there is open water. This resulted in a notable freak blizzard of the middle of May 2008 that left 30 centimetres (12 in) of snow on the ground. Winters and springs are influenced by the inland position, with January being quite a bit colder than coastal areas to the east in Gävleborg but spring warming up sooner with a very low seasonal lag.

Climate data for Leksand 2002–2021 (extremes since 1963)
Month	Jan	Feb	Mar	Apr	May	Jun	Jul	Aug	Sep	Oct	Nov	Dec	Year
Record high °C (°F)	10.1 (50.2)	11.4 (52.5)	16.7 (62.1)	22.9 (73.2)	29.9 (85.8)	32.8 (91.0)	32.1 (89.8)	33.5 (92.3)	25.2 (77.4)	21.2 (70.2)	14.6 (58.3)	11.4 (52.5)	33.5 (92.3)
Mean maximum °C (°F)	5.2 (41.4)	6.4 (43.5)	12.3 (54.1)	18.1 (64.6)	24.5 (76.1)	27.0 (80.6)	28.2 (82.8)	26.7 (80.1)	21.5 (70.7)	15.4 (59.7)	10.2 (50.4)	6.2 (43.2)	29.5 (85.1)
Mean daily maximum °C (°F)	−2.0 (28.4)	−0.7 (30.7)	4.4 (39.9)	10.7 (51.3)	16.0 (60.8)	20.4 (68.7)	22.5 (72.5)	20.5 (68.9)	15.7 (60.3)	8.6 (47.5)	3.3 (37.9)	−0.2 (31.6)	9.9 (49.9)
Daily mean °C (°F)	−5.3 (22.5)	−4.4 (24.1)	−0.5 (31.1)	5.0 (41.0)	10.2 (50.4)	14.6 (58.3)	17.0 (62.6)	16.4 (61.5)	11.1 (52.0)	5.5 (41.9)	0.7 (33.3)	−3.2 (26.2)	5.6 (42.1)
Mean daily minimum °C (°F)	−8.5 (16.7)	−8.0 (17.6)	−5.4 (22.3)	−0.9 (30.4)	4.3 (39.7)	8.8 (47.8)	11.4 (52.5)	10.3 (50.5)	6.5 (43.7)	1.4 (34.5)	−2.0 (28.4)	−6.1 (21.0)	1.0 (33.8)
Mean minimum °C (°F)	−20.7 (−5.3)	−19.9 (−3.8)	−16.4 (2.5)	−7.6 (18.3)	−3.5 (25.7)	2.6 (36.7)	5.1 (41.2)	2.9 (37.2)	−1.0 (30.2)	−7.2 (19.0)	−11.5 (11.3)	−17.1 (1.2)	−23.5 (−10.3)
Record low °C (°F)	−38.3 (−36.9)	−35.7 (−32.3)	−30.0 (−22.0)	−18.3 (−0.9)	−7.3 (18.9)	−1.7 (28.9)	1.7 (35.1)	−0.7 (30.7)	−5.9 (21.4)	−14.5 (5.9)	−22.2 (−8.0)	−32.4 (−26.3)	−38.3 (−36.9)
Average precipitation mm (inches)	39.0 (1.54)	27.9 (1.10)	27.2 (1.07)	25.7 (1.01)	60.3 (2.37)	77.7 (3.06)	87.5 (3.44)	76.4 (3.01)	42.7 (1.68)	57.4 (2.26)	43.5 (1.71)	39.1 (1.54)	604.4 (23.79)
Average extreme snow depth cm (inches)	24 (9.4)	32 (13)	26 (10)	10 (3.9)	2 (0.8)	0 (0)	0 (0)	0 (0)	0 (0)	1 (0.4)	9 (3.5)	19 (7.5)	41 (16)
Source 1: SMHI Open Data for Leksand, precipitation
Source 2: SMHI Open Data for Leksand, temperature

== Industry ==
Local industry in Leksand includes Leksandsbröd, a producer of traditional Swedish Crispbread.

== Notable people ==
- Filip Forsberg - Active National Hockey League (NHL) forward for Nashville Predators, drafted in 2012
- Per-Olov Brasar - Former National Hockey League (NHL) forward, active 1977 to 1982
- Kristian Matsson - The Tallest Man on Earth, folk musician
- Johan Hedberg - Former NHL goalkeeper with the Pittsburgh Penguins, Dallas Stars, Atlanta Thrashers and New Jersey Devils
- Anders J. Dahlin - Internationally acclaimed tenor and opera singer
- Victor Rask - Former NHL forward with the Carolina Hurricanes, Minnesota Wild, and Seattle Kraken, currently plays for HC Fribourg-Gottéron in the Swiss National League
- Hugo Alfven, composer (buried at Leksand)

== Sister cities ==
- Aurora, Ontario, Canada
- Tōbetsu, Hokkaido, Japan
