= Alvik, Leksand =

Alvik
- Location within Dalarna Location within Sweden
- Coordinates: 60°45′N 14°52′E
- Country: Sweden
- Province: Dalarna
- County: Dalarna County
- Municipality: Leksand Municipality

Area
  - Total: 0.88 km^{2} (0.34 sq mi)

Population (31 December 2010)
  - Total: 227
  - Density: 258/km^{2} (670/sq mi)
- Time zone: UTC+1 (CET)
  - Summer (DST): UTC+2 (CEST)
- Climate: Dfc

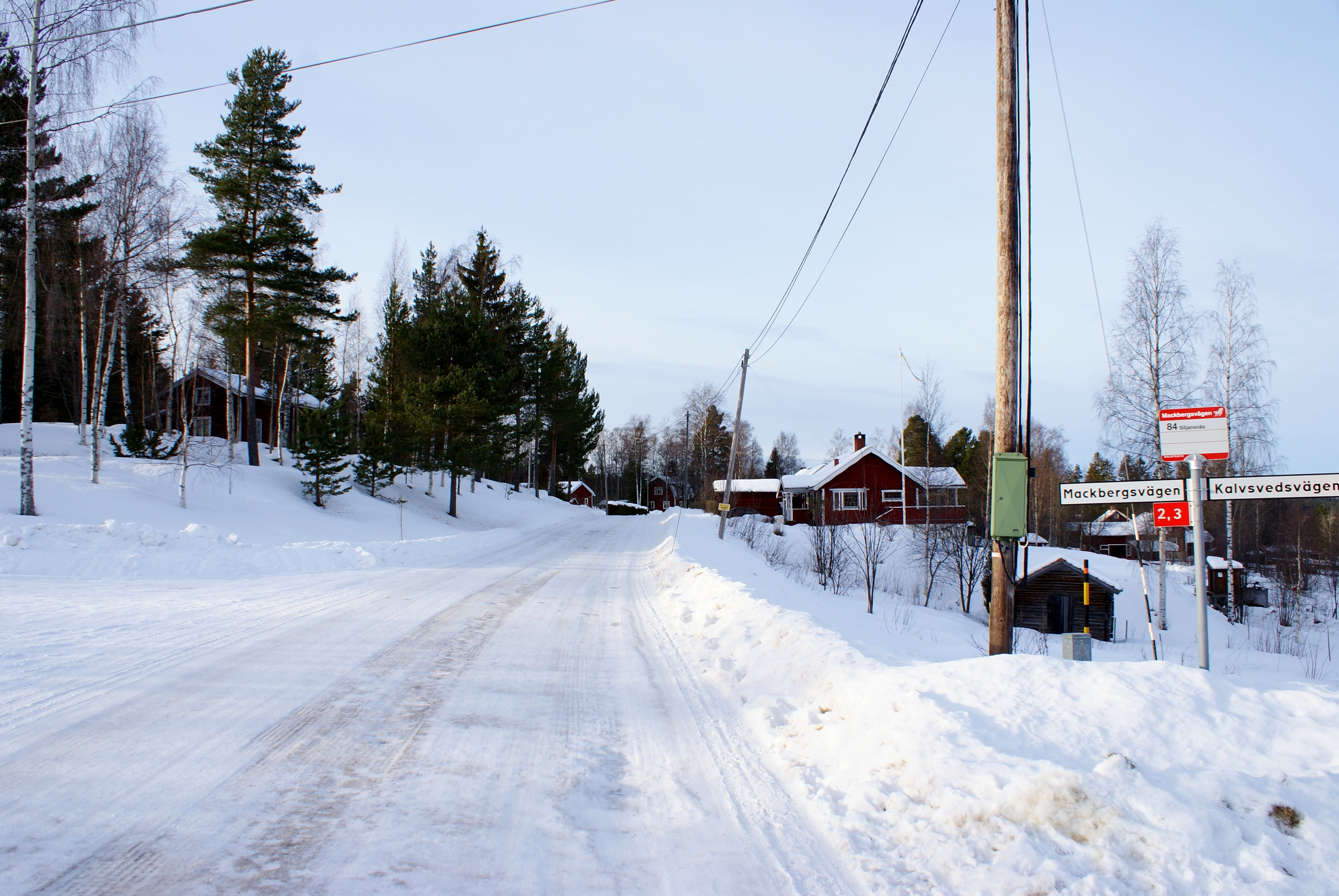
Alvik Leksand in winter

Alvik is a locality situated in Leksand Municipality, Dalarna County, Sweden, with 227 inhabitants in 2010.
