= Oreälven =

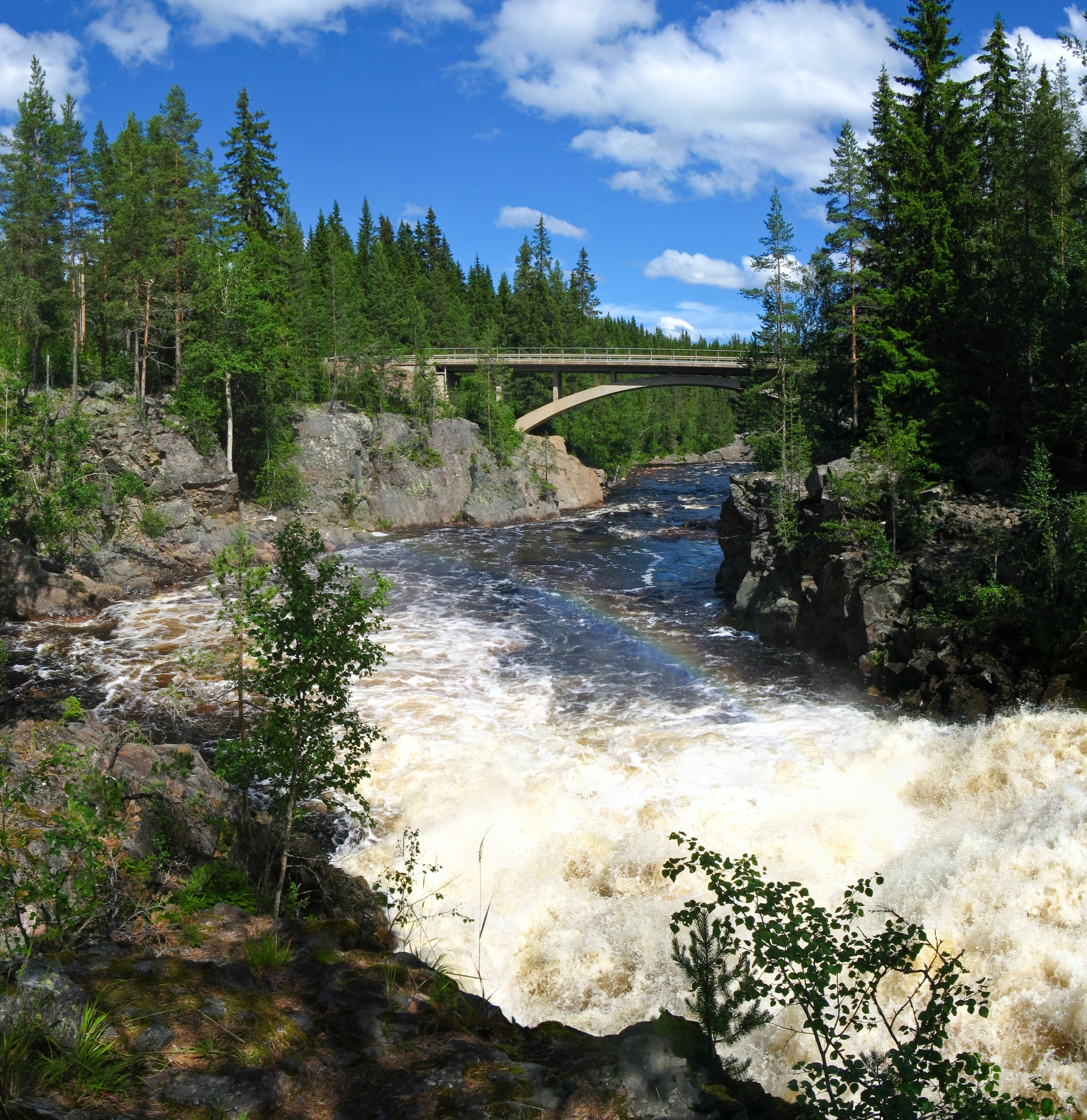
- Waterfall of the Oreälven 44 km north of Orsa

Location
- Country: Sweden

Physical characteristics
- Mouth: Orsa Lake
  - coordinates: 61°07′40″N 14°35′00″E
- Length: 235 km (146 mi)
- Basin size: 3,340 km^{2} (1,290 sq mi)

A smaller influx of Lake Orsasjön is the Oreälven in Sweden with a length of approx. 110 kilometres. The river has an extensive set of salmons and the water quality is class I. Many athletes like to use the river for rafting purposes.
