= Djurås =

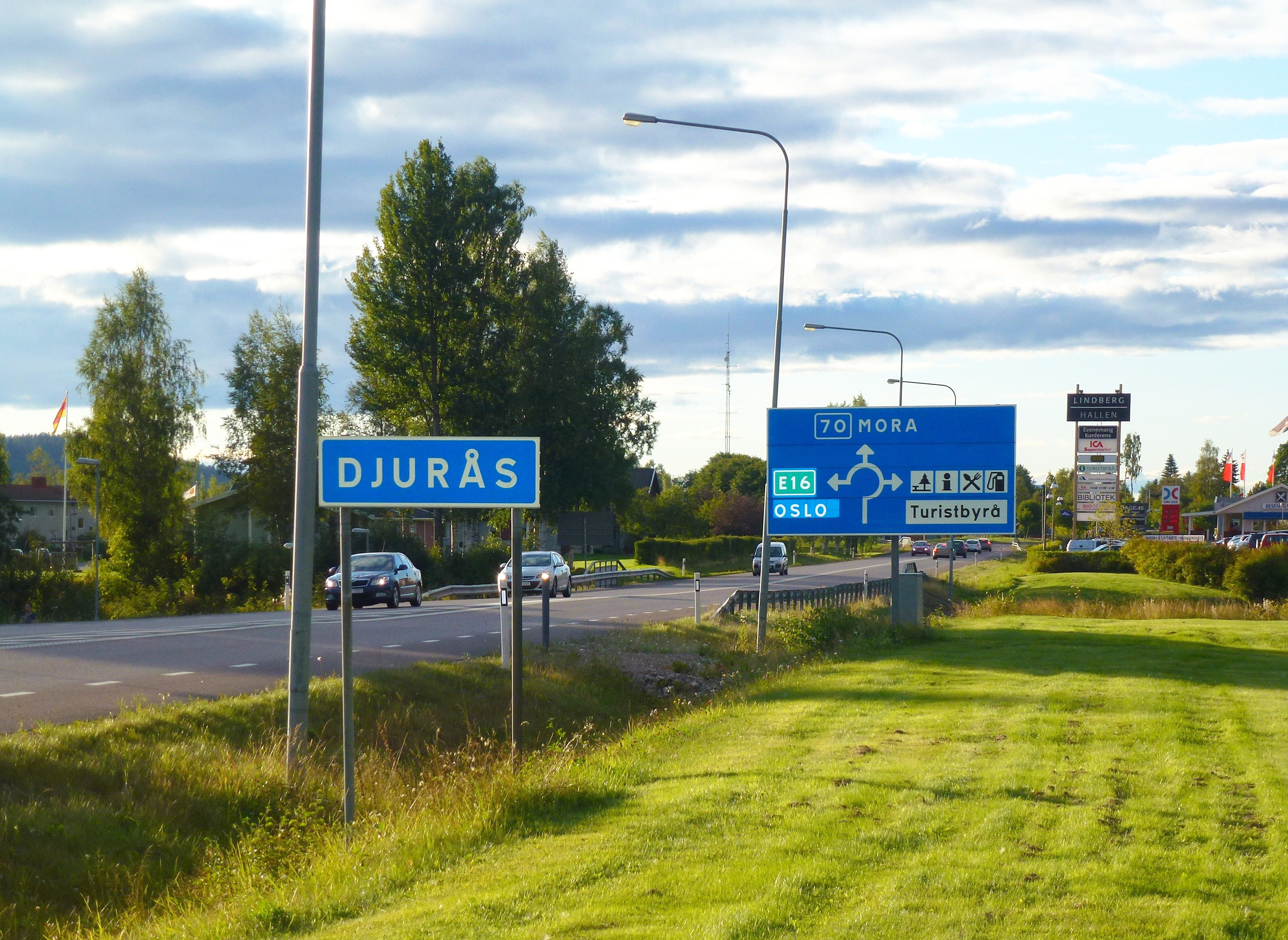
- Djuras sign

- Location within Dalarna Location within Sweden
- Coordinates: 60°33′N 15°08′E
- Country: Sweden
- Province: Dalarna
- County: Dalarna County
- Municipality: Gagnef Municipality

Area
  - Total: 1.57 km^{2} (0.61 sq mi)

Population (31 December 2010)
  - Total: 1,278
  - Density: 812/km^{2} (2,100/sq mi)
- Time zone: UTC+1 (CET)
  - Summer (DST): UTC+2 (CEST)

Djurås is a locality and the seat of Gagnef Municipality in Dalarna County, Sweden. It had 1,278 inhabitants in 2010.
