= Näs bruk =

- Location within Dalarna Location within Sweden
- Coordinates: 60°11′N 16°28′E
- Country: Sweden
- Province: Dalarna
- County: Dalarna County
- Municipality: Avesta Municipality

Area
  - Total: 0.58 km^{2} (0.22 sq mi)

Population (31 December 2010)
  - Total: 207
  - Density: 360/km^{2} (930/sq mi)
- Time zone: UTC+1 (CET)
  - Summer (DST): UTC+2 (CEST)

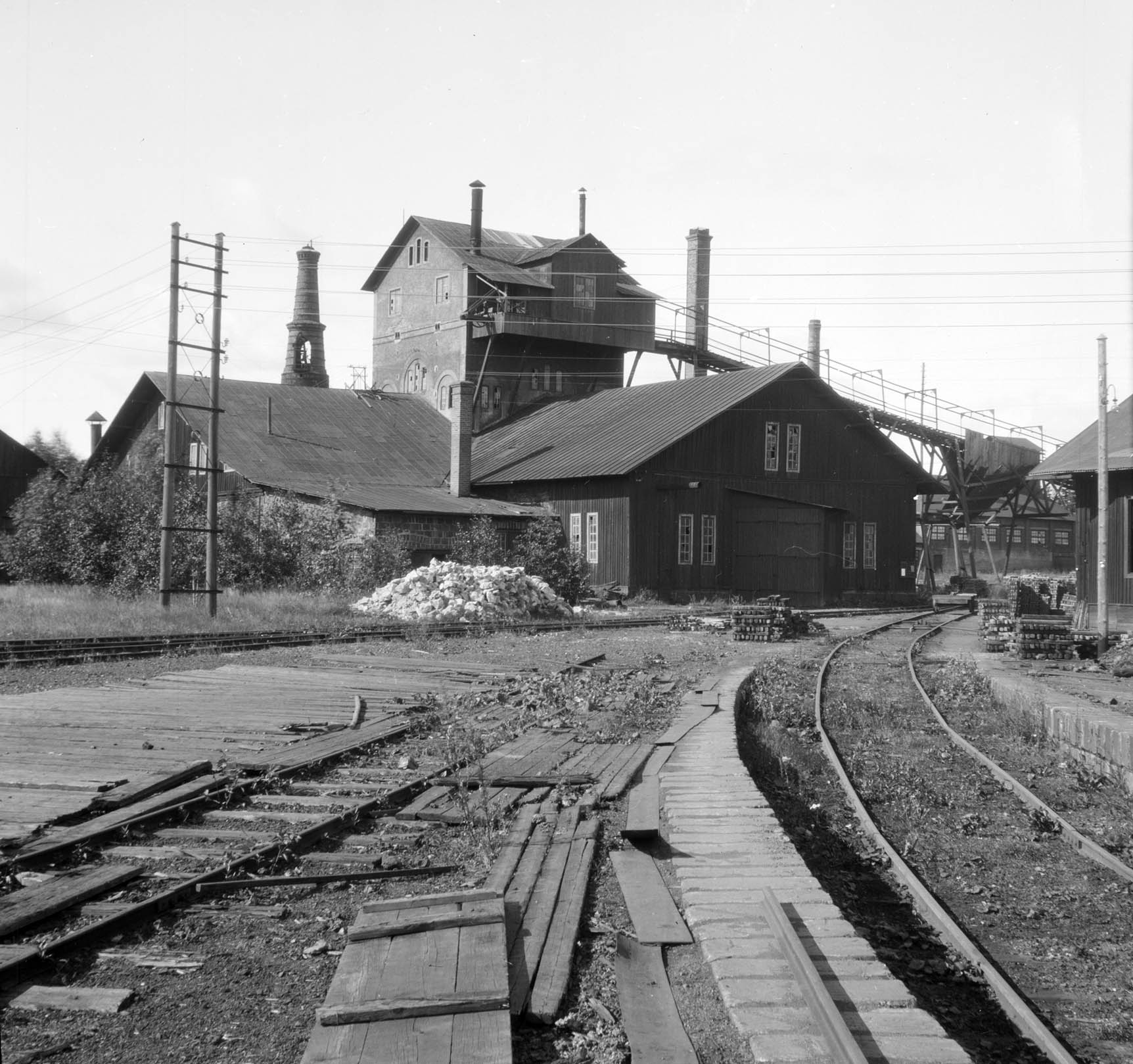
Näs bruk

Näs bruk is a locality situated in Avesta Municipality, Dalarna County, Sweden, with 207 inhabitants in 2010.
