= Listed buildings in Dalarna County =

There are 76 listed buildings (Swedish: byggnadsminne) in Dalarna County.

== Avesta Municipality ==
placeholder

== Borlänge Municipality ==
Image	Name	Premise	Number of buildings	Year built	Architect	Coordinates	ID
	Industriskolan	Utanfors 5 Previously Stg 2948; Forsa 46:3	1	1931–1932	Osvald Almqvist	60.49204°N 15.43654°E	21300000014143
	Ornässtugan	Stora Ornäs 1:2	4	16th century		60.50727°N 15.55283°E	21300000014366
	Rommeheds militärläger	Norr Romme 13:6-8	33	1797–1906		60.43407°N 15.50108°E	21300000014306

== Falun Municipality ==
placeholder

== Gagnef Municipality ==
There are no listed buildings in Gagnef Municipality.

== Hedemora Municipality ==
Image	Name	Premise	Number of buildings	Year built	Architect	Coordinates	ID
	Bos-Kalles gård	Tjädern 5	6			60.27830°N 15.98905°E	21300000014206
	Gamla apoteket	Ugglan 1	1			60.27983°N 15.98667°E	21000001673841
	Garpenbergs herrgård, Skogshögskolan i Garpenberg	Garpenbergs gård 2:4; Del av Garpenbergs gård 2:70, 2:8	6			60.28313°N 16.20371°E	21300000014189
	Gruvkapellet vid Odalfältet	okänt	none			60.30791°N 16.18681°E	21300000014190
	Stjärnsunds herrgård Smedja	Stjärnsund 2:10, 2:26	20			60.43243°N 16.21279°E	21000001583860
	Norns bruk inklusive Norns kapell	Norn 1:97 previously Norn 1:1	39			60.21981°N 15.77914°E	21300000014187
	Perssonska gården	Gäddan 1	14			60.27946°N 15.98875°E	21300000027134
	Teaterladan	Svalan 2	1			60.28041°N 15.98752°E	21300000014203
	Wahlmanska huset (Hedemora 6:1	Finken 1); Gamla varmbadhuset	1			60.28191°N 15.98353°E	21000001683801

== Leksand Municipality ==
placeholder

== Ludvika Municipality ==
placeholder

== Malung-Sälen Municipality ==
placeholder

== Mora Municipality ==
placeholder

== Orsa Municipality ==
placeholder

== Rättvik Municipality ==
placeholder

== Smedjebacken Municipality ==
placeholder

== Säter Municipality ==
placeholder

== Vansbro Municipality ==
placeholder

== Älvdalen Municipality ==
placeholder
