= Nordanö =

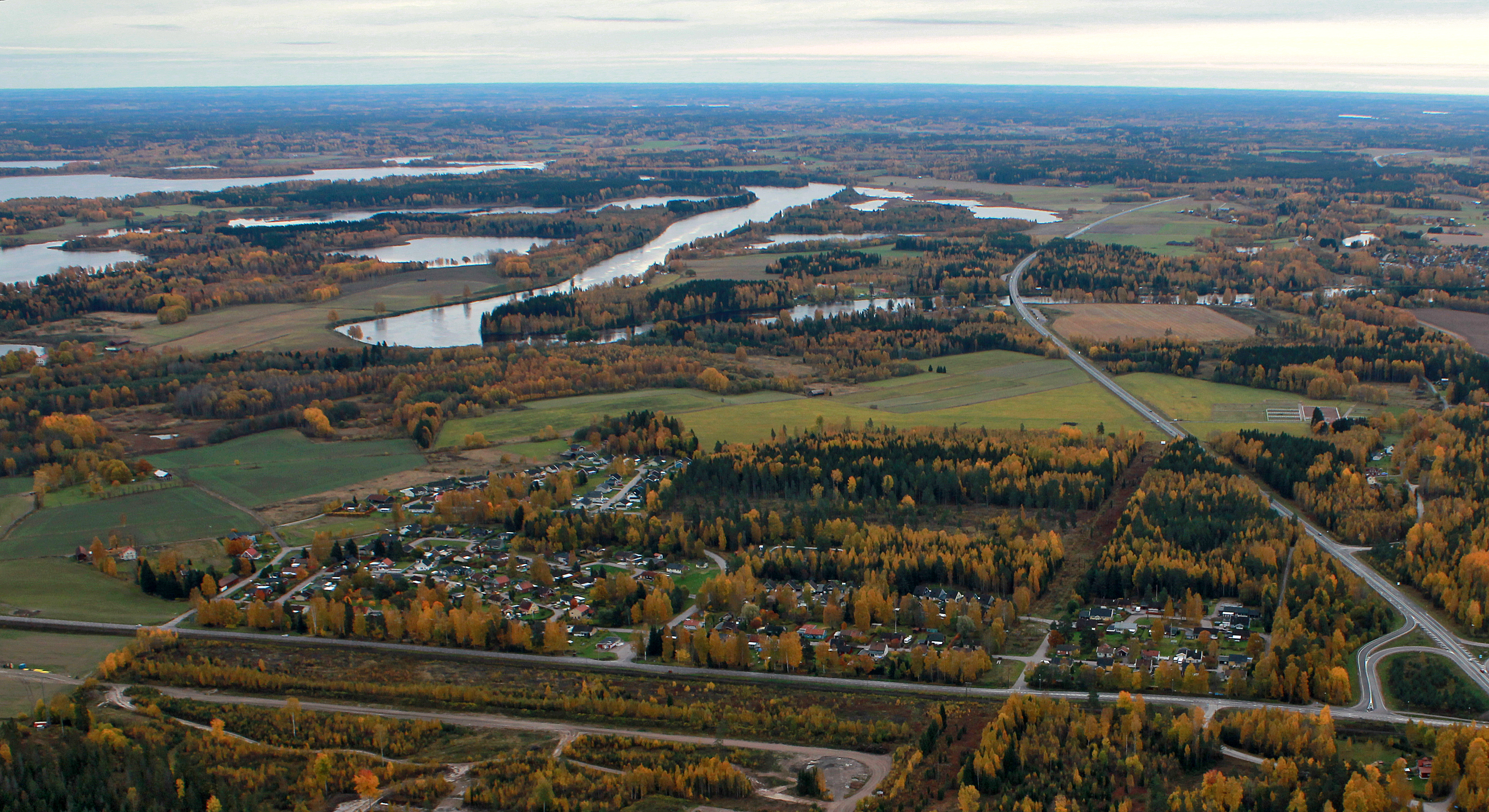
- Nordanö

- Location within Dalarna Location within Sweden
- Coordinates: 60°09′N 16°14′E
- Country: Sweden
- Province: Dalarna
- County: Dalarna County
- Municipality: Avesta Municipality

Area
  - Total: 0.47 km^{2} (0.18 sq mi)

Population (31 December 2010)
  - Total: 435
  - Density: 935/km^{2} (2,420/sq mi)
- Time zone: UTC+1 (CET)
  - Summer (DST): UTC+2 (CEST)

Nordanö is a locality situated in Avesta Municipality, Dalarna County, Sweden, with 435 inhabitants in 2010.
