= Hedemora Gamla Theater =

Theatre in Hedemora, Dalarna County, Sweden

- Teaterladan
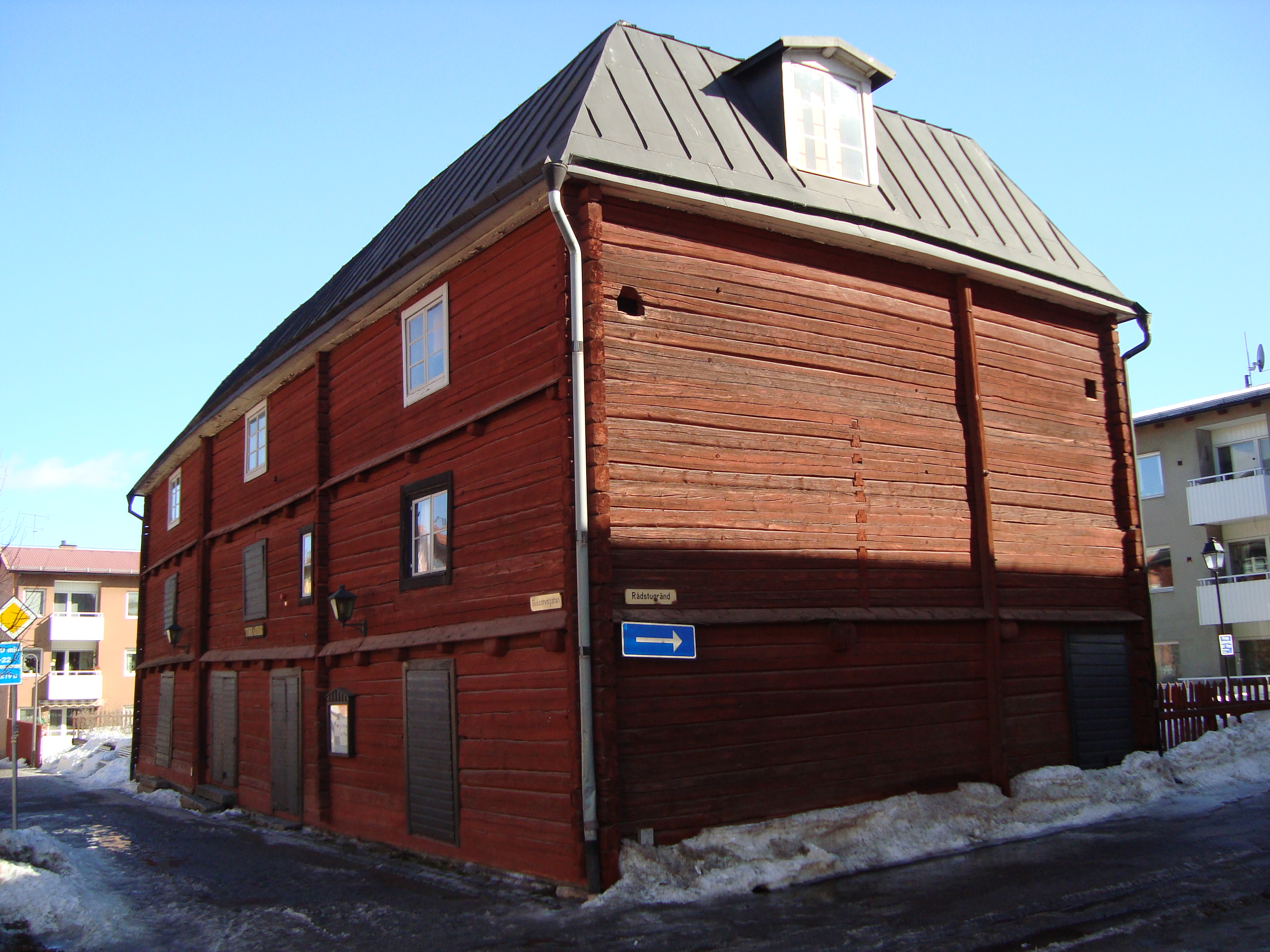
- Hedemora Gamla Theater in March 2010.
- Interactive map of Hedemora Gamla Theater
- Address: Gussarvsgatan 10; Hedemora; Sweden
- Coordinates: 60.2804°N 15.9875°E
- Designation: Listed building

Construction
- Opened: February 1, 1829

Website
- teaterladanhedemora.se (in Swedish)

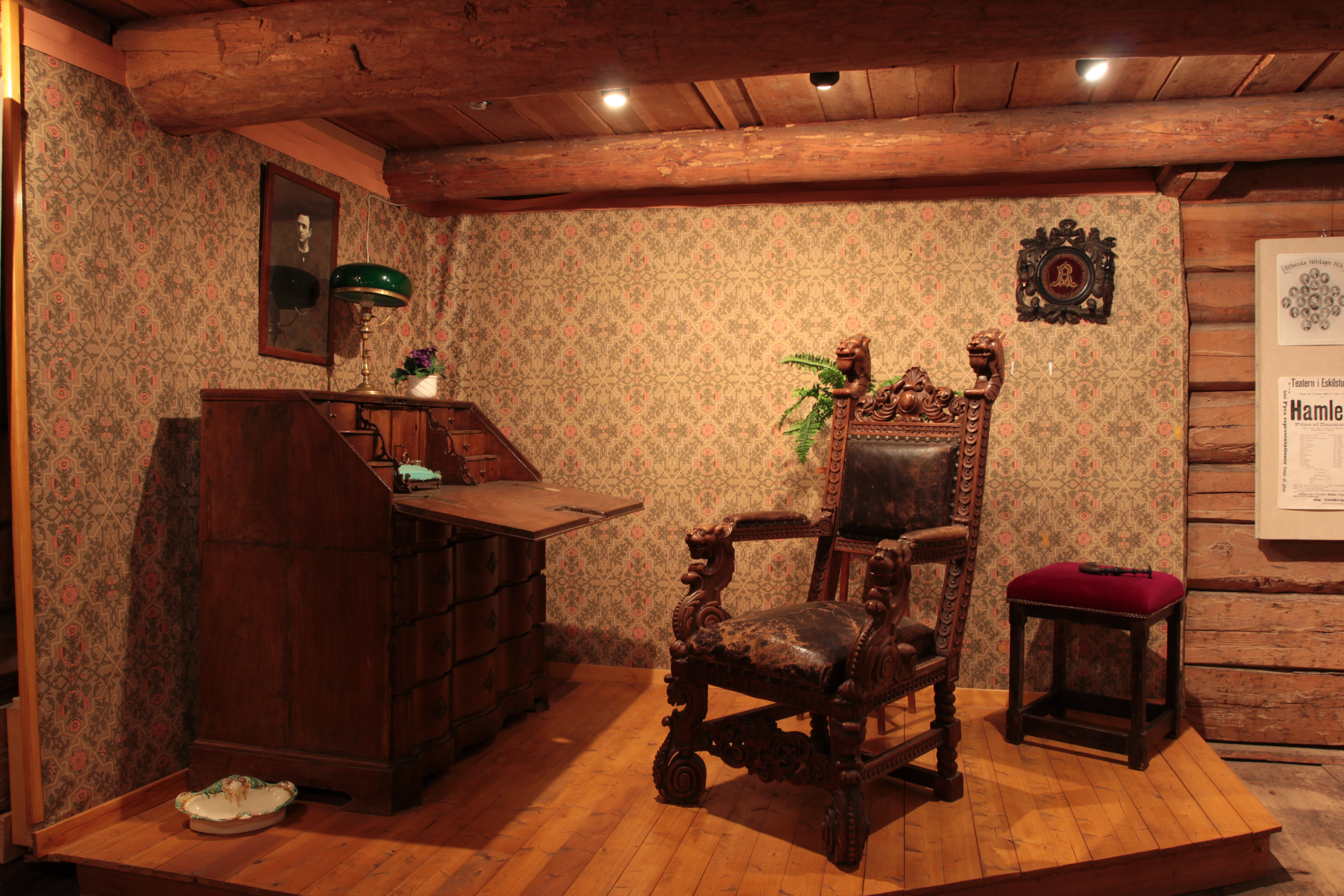
Small museum of actor and showman August Lindberg on the middle floor.

Teaterladan ("theatre barn"), officially Hedemora Gamla Theater (old Swedish spelling of Old Theatre of Hedemora), is a theatre and a listed building in Hedemora, Dalarna County, Sweden. It was built somewhere between 1826 and 1829 by a Hedemora wholesale dealer as a combined warehouse in the bottom two levels and theatre in the third level. The first performance at the stage was a play performed by A. P. Bergmans Sällskap on February 1, 1829. The middle level also had dressing rooms.

From 1888 to 1910 the building was rented by the Salvation Army. When they moved, the building was left unused until 1946, when Hedemora celebrated 500 years as a stad. It was restored, and dedicated by the Crown Prince Couple Gustaf Adolf and Louise on June 20, 1946. The building is a listed building since October 1964.

Part of the European Route of Historic Theatres.
