= Skott =

Swedish singer, songwriter, and producer (born 1991)

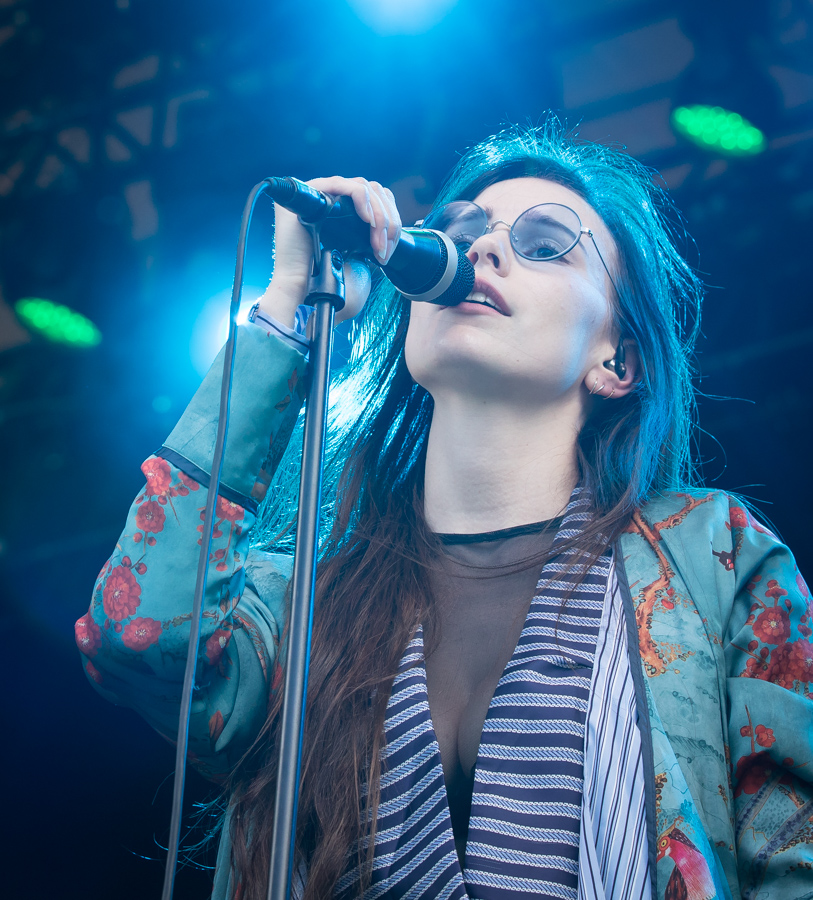
- Skott performing in 2017

Background information
- Born: Pauline Skött; 4 October 1991 (age 34); Vikarbyn, Dalarna, Sweden
- Genres: Alternative pop; Folk; Ambient pop
- Occupations: Singer; songwriter; record producer
- Instruments: Vocals; violin; piano
- Years active: 2016-present
- Website: www.skottpeace.com

Pauline Skött (born 4 October 1991), known mononymously as Skott, is a Swedish singer, songwriter, and producer. She came to global attention in 2016 with her debut single "Porcelain", which brought her to the list of the biggest new talents compiled on YouTube. She is a recipient of the European Border Breakers Award.

== Early life ==
Skott grew up on folk music and traditions in the small Swedish village of Vikarbyn in the middle of the forest, inhabited by folk musicians who wear costumes, play the violin and communicate in their own language, unknown to the rest of the country. Skott broke out of the closed community cut off from civilization only by going to the city for high school. There she first came into contact with popular music. She was drawn to composing music by a video game soundtrack that reminded her of the sounds she grew up with. In order to create something similar, Skott downloaded a simple computer program for creating melodies.

After high school, Skott moved to Stockholm, where she was accepted to study music composition for two years at Musikmakarna, which opened the door to the music industry. The study did not consist of subjects, but of meetings with music producers and representatives of publishing houses, who prepared her for application in the music industry. Immediately after completing her studies, Sony Music offered her a position as a songwriter, so she wrote songs for other artists in Stockholm, until she started a singing career at the age of twenty-five.

== Career ==
In June 2016, Skott released her debut single Porcelain, which caught the attention of singers Lorde and Katy Perry, helping her gain worldwide recognition. EA Sports chose "Porcelain" as the official soundtrack for FIFA 17. Although Skott appeared in front of an audience for the first time in 2016, a year later she already completed her first American and European tour.

Her songwriting reflects the influence of folk, violin, and woodland environments, and has been described as "ethereal" and "atmospheric", with Idolator calling her an "alternative pop phenomenon", while YouTube listed her on Ones to Watch, a list of the hottest new talent for the year 2017. She was awarded the EBBA award the following year.

Speaking to The Guardian, Skott criticized the conditions that music labels impose on aspiring female singers compared to the freedom they provide to male singers. A series of further singles was followed by a debut EP titled Stay Off My Mind in 2018. After Sony Music insisted that she release pop singles that would be played on the radio, she ended her contract and started her own music label, Dollar Menu.

In 2020, Skott released her debut studio album, Always Live for Always, containing 12 songs, including six that she had released independently in previous years. In January 2022, she released an EP entitled A Letter From The Universe.

== Personal life ==
Skott lives in Stockholm, her father is a physicist and mathematician.

== Discography ==
=== Studio albums ===
Title	Details
Always Live for Always	Released: 14 August 2020; Label: Dollar Menu/Cosmos Music; Formats: LP, CD, digital download, streaming
Roses N Guns	Released: 3 March 2023; Label: Dollar Menu/Cosmos Music; Formats: Digital download, streaming

=== EPs ===
Title	Details
Stay Off My Mind	Released: 12 January 2018; Label: Sony Music; Formats: Digital download, streaming
A Letter from the Universe	Released: 21 January 2022; Label: Dollar Menu/Cosmos Music; Formats: Digital download, streaming

=== Singles ===
List of singles as lead artist
Title	Year	Album
"Porcelain"	2016	Always Live for Always
"Wolf"	2016	Non-album single
"Amelia"	2016	Always Live for Always
"Lack of Emotion"	2016	Non-album singles
"Glitter & Gloss"	2017	Non-album singles
"Mermaid"	2017	Non-album singles
"Remain"	2017	Non-album singles
"Stay Off My Mind"	2018	Stay Off My Mind
"Bloodhound"	2019	Always Live for Always
"Midas"	2019	Always Live for Always
"Kodak & Codeine"	2020	Always Live for Always
"Talk About Me"	2020	Always Live for Always
"Tired" (featuring Shylde)	2021	Non-album single
"It's Not Too Late"	2021	A Letter from the Universe
"Sunshine"	2022	Roses N Guns
"Evergreen"	2022	Roses N Guns
"Once in a While [Smile]"	2022	Roses N Guns
"Overcome"	2022	A Letter from the Universe
"Hail Mary"	2023	Roses N Guns
"Obsidian"	2024	TBA
"Made of Stars"	2025	TBA
"Moonlit"	2025	TBA
"Edge of the Earth"	2025	TBA
