= Solvarbo =

- Location within Dalarna Location within Sweden
- Coordinates: 60°24′N 15°40′E
- Country: Sweden
- Province: Dalarna
- County: Dalarna County
- Municipality: Säter Municipality

Area
  - Total: 0.64 km^{2} (0.25 sq mi)

Population (31 December 2010)
  - Total: 321
  - Density: 502/km^{2} (1,300/sq mi)
- Time zone: UTC+1 (CET)
  - Summer (DST): UTC+2 (CEST)

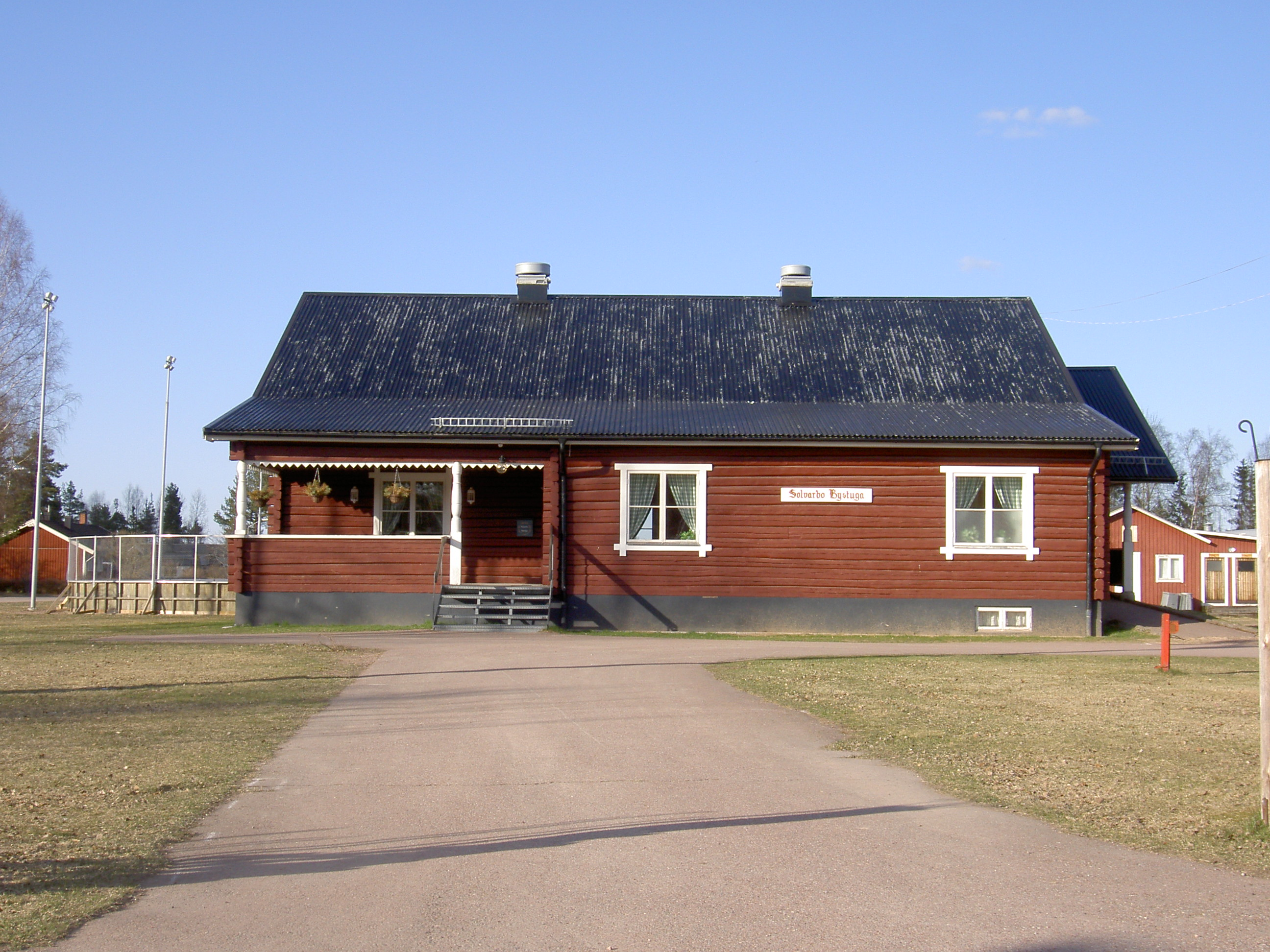
Solvarbo bystuga

Solvarbo (Swedish pronunciation: [ˈsɔ̂lːvarˌbuː]) is a locality situated in Säter Municipality, Dalarna County, Sweden with 321 inhabitants in 2010.
