= Skedvi kyrkby =

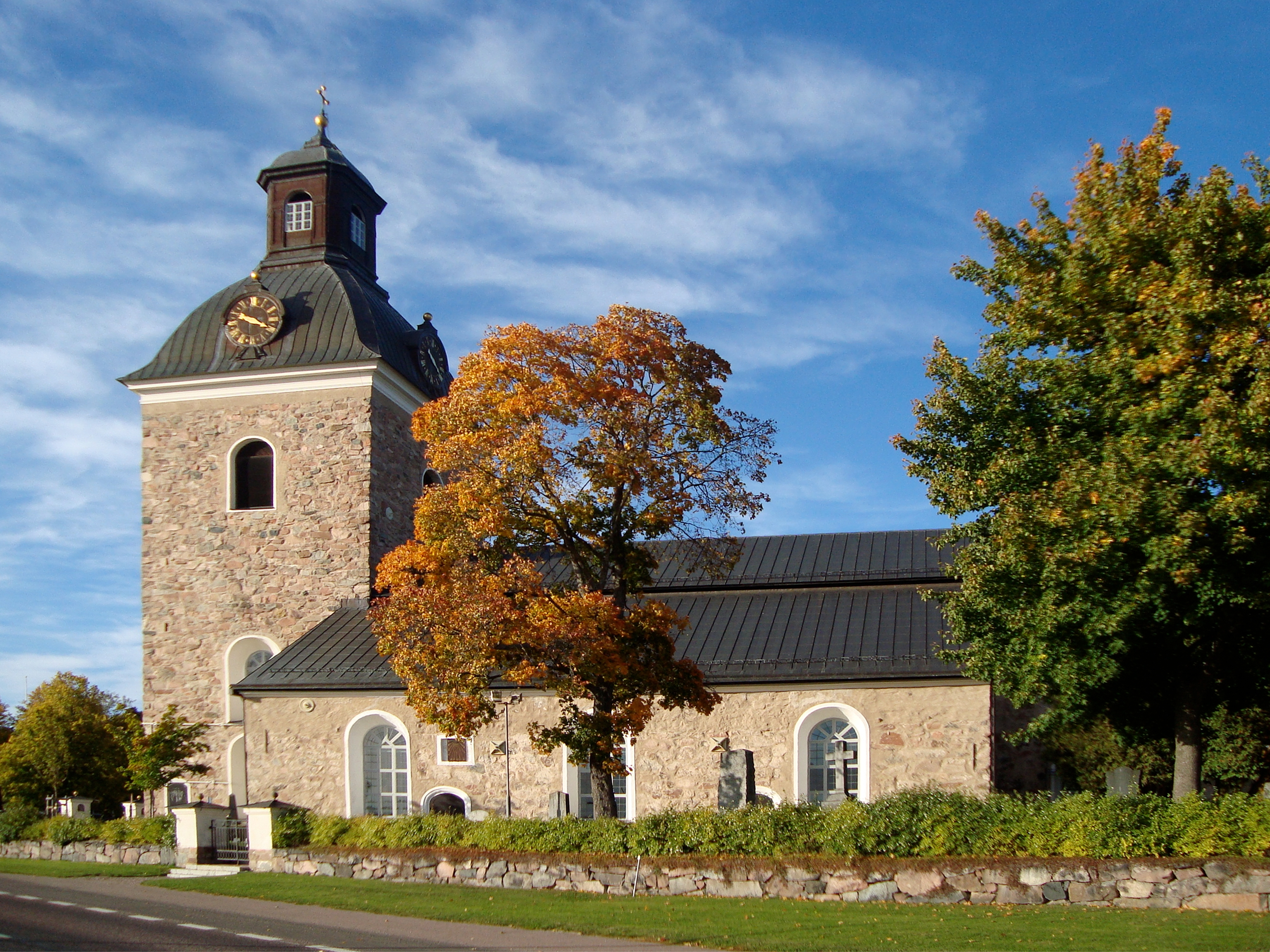
- Skedvi Church in September 2008

- Location within Dalarna Location within Sweden
- Coordinates: 60°24′20″N 15°48′17″E
- Country: Sweden
- Province: Dalarna
- County: Dalarna County
- Municipality: Säter Municipality

Area
  - Total: 0.38 km^{2} (0.15 sq mi)

Population (31 December 2010)
  - Total: 208
  - Density: 546/km^{2} (1,410/sq mi)
- Time zone: UTC+1 (CET)
  - Summer (DST): UTC+2 (CEST)

Skedvi kyrkby is a locality situated in Säter Municipality, Dalarna County, Sweden with 208 inhabitants in 2010.
