= Listed buildings in Halland County =

There are 45 listed buildings (Swedish: byggnadsminne) in Halland County.

== Falkenberg Municipality ==
Image	Name	Premises	Number of buildings	Year built	Architect	Coordinates	ID
	Borgen Hällerup	Hällarp 1:7	1			56.96396°N 12.52913°E	21300000014049
	Olofsbo Hembygdsgård	Olofsbo 4:34	4			56.92899°N 12.42167°E	21300000014082
	Stadshuset; Rådhuset; Rörbeckska huset Rådhustorget	Svea 10; Innerstaden 3:1	3			56.90425°N 12.49190°E	21300000022013
	Tullbron	Herting 2:1	1			56.90296°N 12.49417°E	21300000014010

== Halmstad Municipality ==
Image	Name	Premises	Number of buildings	Year built	Architect	Coordinates	ID
	Biografen Röda Kvarn	Drottning Kristina 1	1			56.67612°N 12.85863°E	21300000014037
	Televerkets hus	Gråmunken 1 previously Gråmunken 24	1			56.67716°N 12.85758°E	21300000014108
	Brooktorpsgården	Broktorp 11	1			56.67380°N 12.85538°E	21300000014028
	Bruno Mathssons sommarhus	Onsjö 32:16	1			56.66255°N 12.73922°E	21300000025526
	Halmstads slott	Slottet 1	1			56.67137°N 12.85763°E	21300000014040
	Kirsten Munks hus	Kirsten Munck 1	1			56.67555°N 12.85904°E	21300000014033
	Mostorp	Mostorp 5:1	2			56.83959°N 12.72355°E	21300000014007
	Norre Port	Halmstad 5:1	1			56.67744°N 12.85929°E	21300000026313
	Särdals kvarn	Särdal 1:7	2			56.74146°N 12.65789°E	21300000014023
	Tylöns fyrplats	Tylön 1:1	6			56.64685°N 12.71038°E	21300000014084
	Vapnö slott	Vapnö 6:2 previously Vapnö 2:1	3			56.71296°N 12.84102°E	21300000014088

== Hylte Municipality ==
Image	Name	Premises	Number of buildings	Year built	Architect	Coordinates	ID
	Brunnsbacka sågkvarn	Brunnsbacka 1:2-3	1			56.98186°N 13.54039°E	21300000014083
	Rydöbruks missionshus	Rydö 1:13	1			56.95998°N 13.13456°E	21300000014085
	Slätteryds byskola	Slätteryd 1:7	4			56.97121°N 13.62576°E	21300000025527

== Kungsbacka Municipality ==
Image	Name	Premises	Number of buildings	Year built	Architect	Coordinates	ID
	Riksdagsmannagården i Axtorp	Axtorp 1:6	3			57.42095°N 12.29705°E	21300000014113
	Äskhults by	Äskhult 1:2, 1:4, 1:5, 1:11 previously Äskhult 1:1, 1:3	11			57.42713°N 12.28312°E	21300000014062
	Mårtagården	Iserås 6:1	7			57.39437°N 11.99537°E	21300000014059
	Knapegården	Råö 13:1	7			57.39120°N 11.95916°E	21300000014115
	Metodistkapellet Bethel	Lunna 11:5	1			57.46083°N 11.99845°E	21300000014086
	Nidingens fyrplats	Nidingen 1:1	12			57.30296°N 11.90194°E	21300000014064
	Stolpboden, Särö	Särö 1:502	1			57.50567°N 11.93942°E	21300000014081
	Tjolöholm Castle	Tjolöholm 1:1 and others	18			57.40255°N 12.10663°E	21300000014011
	Wea kaptensgård	Ekenäs 5:18	3			57.51562°N 11.97630°E	21300000014080

== Laholm Municipality ==
Image	Name	Premises	Number of buildings	Year built	Architect	Coordinates	ID
	Vippentorpet	Bygget 1:3	1			56.50471°N 13.24147°E	21000001589320
	Hausknechtska huset	Hästen 5	1			56.51208°N 13.04398°E	21000001589340
	Backstugan i Fladalt	Fladalt 1:44	1			56.36606°N 13.14641°E	21300000014117
	Bollaltebygget	Bållalt 2:8 previously Bollalte 2:8	5			56.57657°N 13.30331°E	21300000014046
	Skottorps slott	Skottorp 1:39	5			56.43581°N 12.97898°E	21300000014079
	Vallens slott	Vallen 1:23	3			56.42945°N 13.12756°E	21300000014104
	Västralt	Västralt 2:10; Lottens	3			56.51497°N 13.31044°E	21300000027238

== Varberg Municipality ==
Image	Name	Premises	Number of buildings	Year built	Architect	Coordinates	ID
	Hägareds gård	Hägared 1:1	7			57.02163°N 12.39320°E	21000001589380
	Långanskogen	Ästad 1:17	1			57.06106°N 12.53786°E	21300000014009
	Båtsmanstorpet Hallmans	Olofstorp 7:4	1			57.16677°N 12.40515°E	21300000014130
	Grimetons radiostation, radioby	Grimeton 13:34, 13:37-13:45	20			57.11430°N 12.39923°E	21300000016135
	Grunnarps gård	Grunnarp 3:12	4			57.14810°N 12.35612°E	21300000014131
	Åkrabergs ladugård	Värö-Åkraberg 1:12	1			57.25889°N 12.23186°E	21300000014134
	Lindhovs kungsgård	Lindhov 1:1	7			57.14223°N 12.26418°E	21300000014048
	Societetshuset	Getakärr 3:60	1			57.10670°N 12.24296°E	21300000014091
	Sunvära kvarn	Sunnvära 11:9	1			57.24602°N 12.21474°E	21300000014135
	Varbergs fästning	Getakärr 3:62	12			57.10641°N 12.23998°E	21300000014133
	Åsklosters kungsgård	Åskloster 1:1	3			57.22525°N 12.22004°E	21300000014106
