= Naglarby och Enbacka =

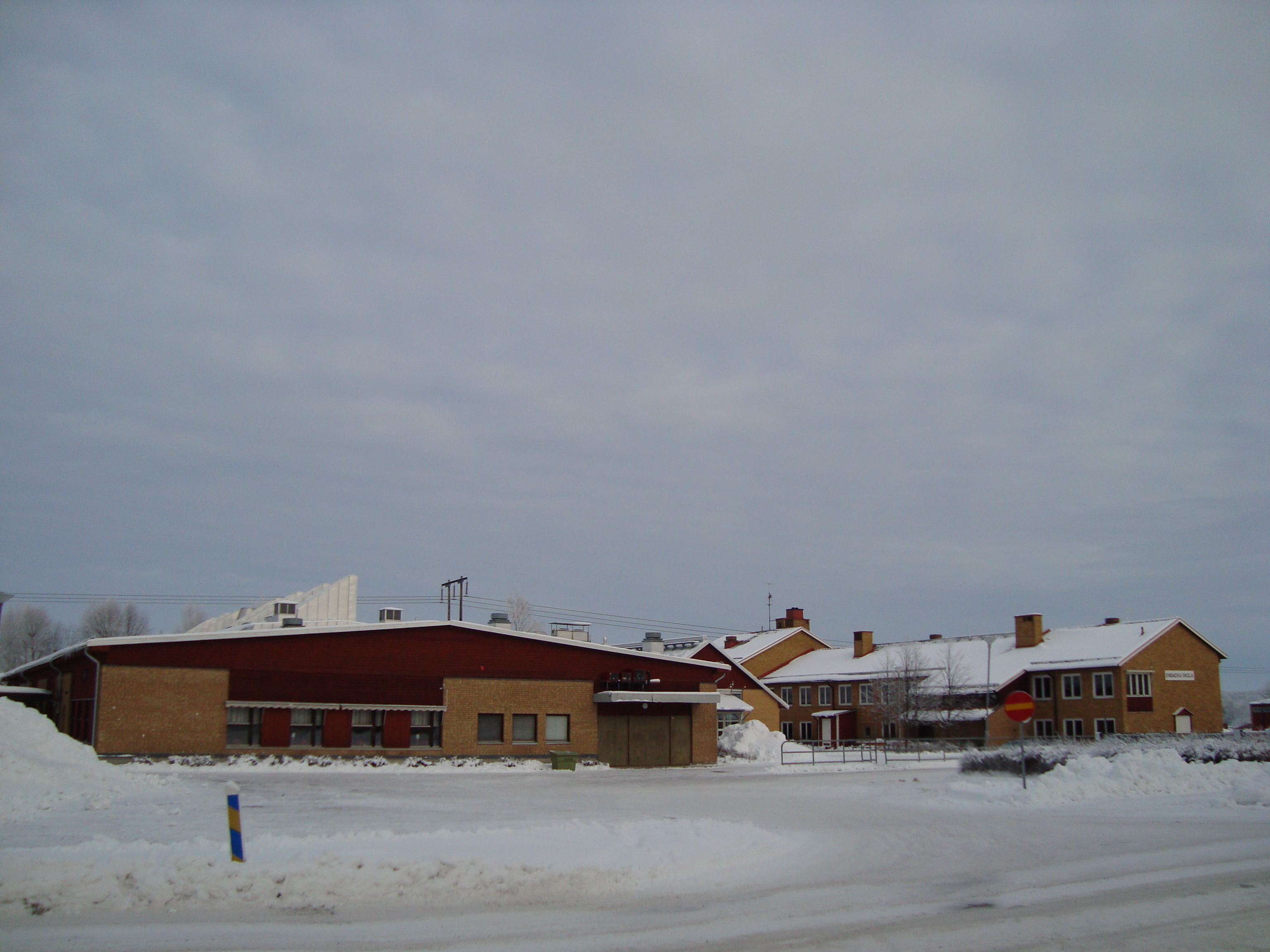
- Enbacka school

- Location within Dalarna Location within Sweden
- Coordinates: 60°25′N 15°36′E
- Country: Sweden
- Province: Dalarna
- County: Dalarna County
- Municipality: Säter Municipality

Area
  - Total: 1.21 km^{2} (0.47 sq mi)

Population (31 December 2010)
  - Total: 961
  - Density: 797/km^{2} (2,060/sq mi)
- Time zone: UTC+1 (CET)
  - Summer (DST): UTC+2 (CEST)

Naglarby och Enbacka is a locality situated in Säter Municipality, Dalarna County, Sweden with 961 inhabitants in 2010.
