= Wahlmanska huset =

Wahlmanska huset (Wahlman building)
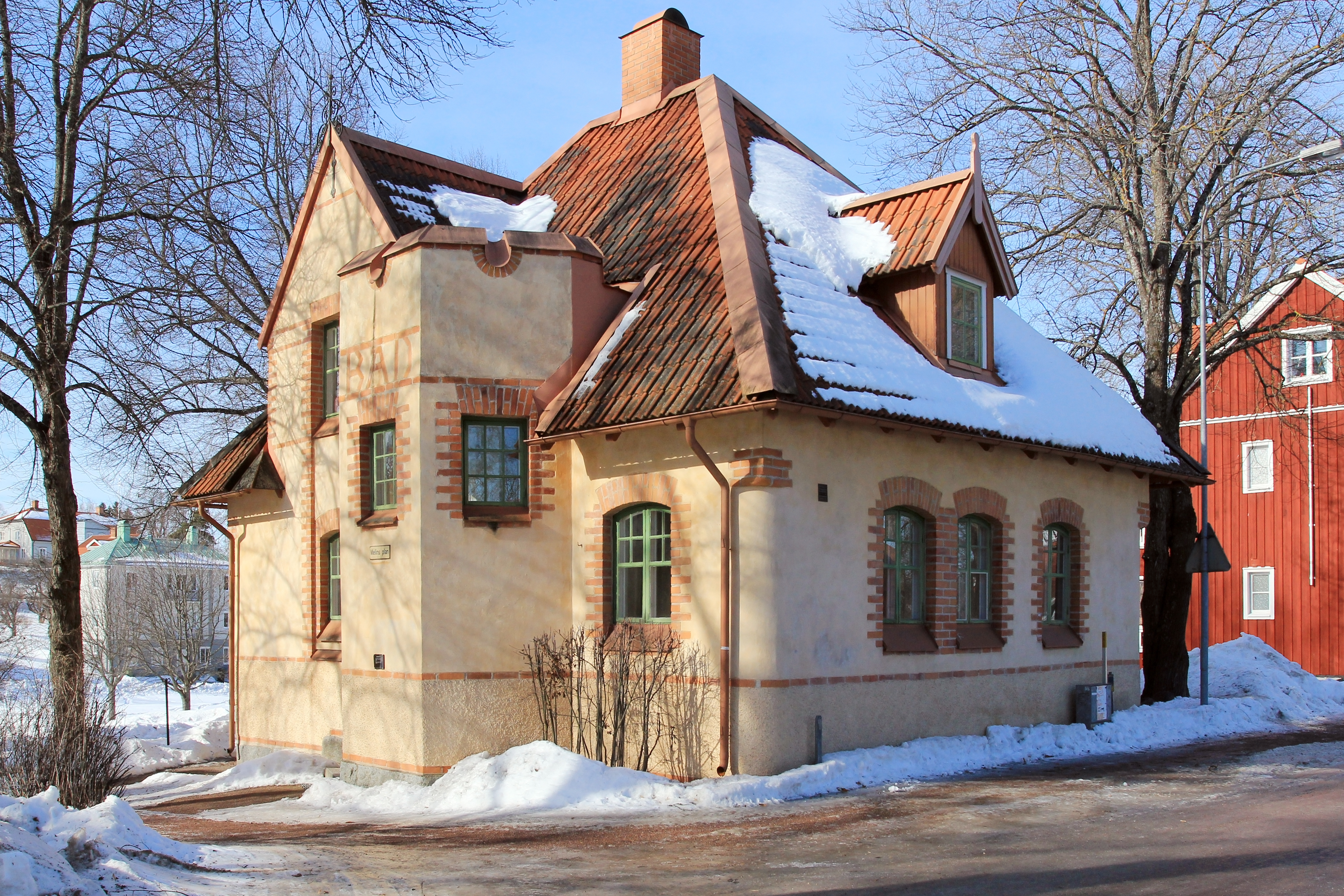
- Wahlmanska huset
- Interactive map of the Wahlmanska huset (Wahlman building) area
- Alternative names: Gamla varmbadhuset

General information
- Classification: Listed building (2010)
- Location: Långgatan 23, Hedemora, Sweden
- Coordinates: 60.28190°N 15.98352°E
- Inaugurated: 1899
- Renovated: 1982
- Owner: Hedemora Municipality

Technical details
- Material: Framework: Bricks; Facade: Plaster; Roof covering: Rooftiles; Base: Granite

Design and construction
- Architect: Lars Israel Wahlman

Wahlmanska huset (Wahlman building), also gamla varmbadhuset (former bath) is a building in Hedemora, Sweden, and a listed building since 2010. The house is named after the architect Lars Israel Wahlman, and was built in 1899 as the town's bath. It served as such until 1974, when the swimming- and sports venue Vasahallen was built. Wahlmanska huset was then left to degenerate until 1982, when a restoration was conducted and the building became a gallery for temporary art exhibitions.

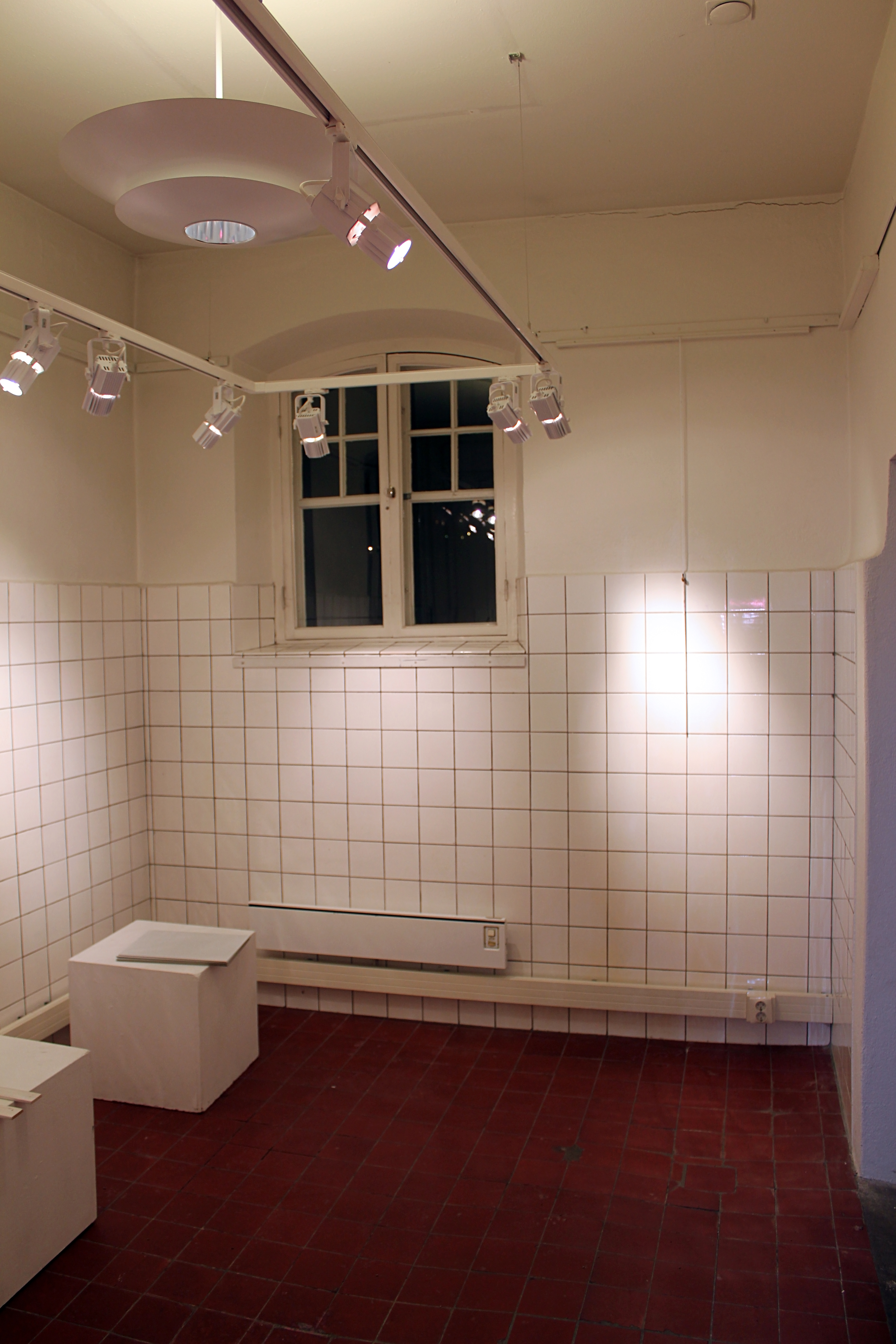
Part of the interior.
