= Mora, Säter =

Mora
- Location within Dalarna Location within Sweden
- Coordinates: 60°24′N 15°36′E
- Country: Sweden
- Province: Dalarna
- County: Dalarna County
- Municipality: Säter Municipality

Area
  - Total: 0.96 km^{2} (0.37 sq mi)

Population (31 December 2010)
  - Total: 817
  - Density: 854/km^{2} (2,210/sq mi)
- Time zone: UTC+1 (CET)
  - Summer (DST): UTC+2 (CEST)

Mora, also called Mora by, is a locality situated in Säter Municipality, Dalarna County, Sweden, with 817 inhabitants in 2010.
