= Röjeråsen =

Coordinates: 60.95°N 14.9833°E

Röjeråsen is a small village situated on a ridge 5 kilometres north of Vikarbyn in Dalarna, Sweden.
