= Lars Israel Wahlman =

Swedish architect

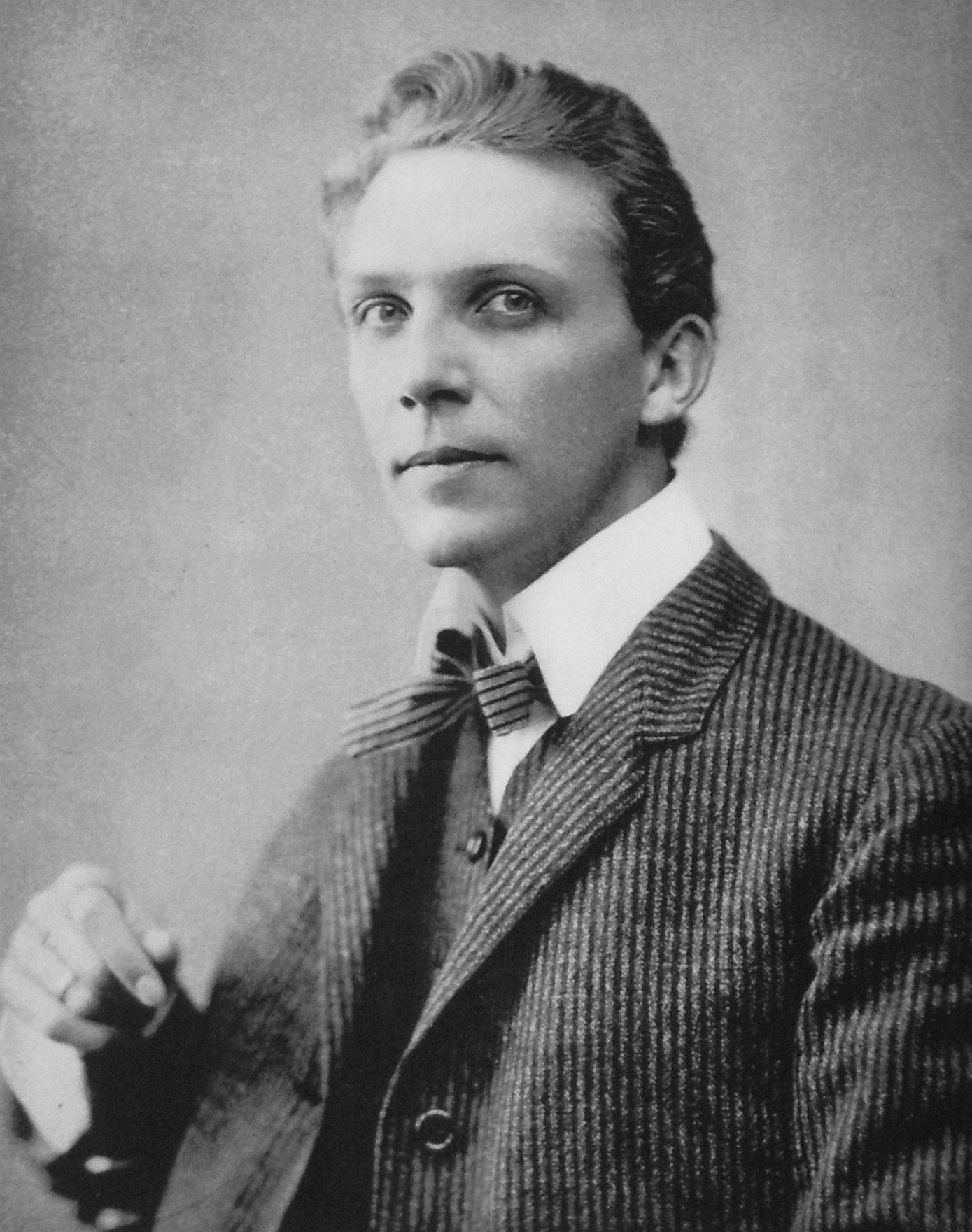
Lars Israel Wahlman.

Lars Israël Wahlman (April 17, 1870, Hedemora – September 18, 1952, Danderyd) was a Swedish architect. He was a supporter of the Arts and Crafts movement in Sweden and his architecture was influenced by romantic nationalism. His most famous work include Tjolöholm Castle and Engelbrekt Church. In his birthplace Hedemora one of the buildings he designed, the Wahlman building, bears his name.
