= Horndal =

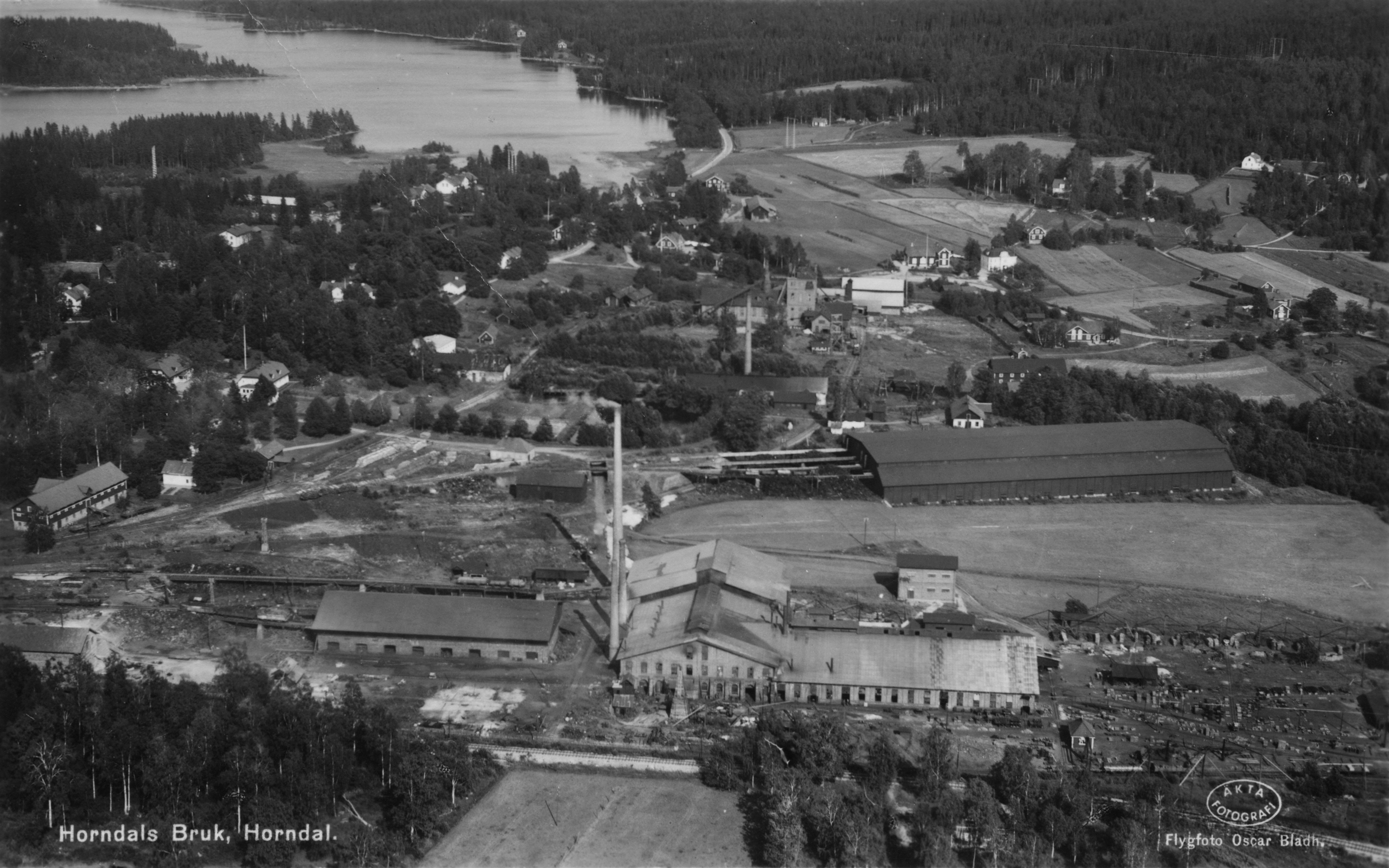

- Location within Dalarna Location within Sweden
- Coordinates: 60°18′N 16°25′E
- Country: Sweden
- Province: Dalarna
- County: Dalarna County
- Municipality: Avesta Municipality

Area
  - Total: 3.37 km^{2} (1.30 sq mi)

Population (31 December 2010)
  - Total: 1,114
  - Density: 330/km^{2} (850/sq mi)
- Time zone: UTC+1 (CET)
  - Summer (DST): UTC+2 (CEST)

Horndal is a locality situated in Avesta Municipality, Dalarna County, Sweden, with 1,114 inhabitants in 2010.
