= Säter =

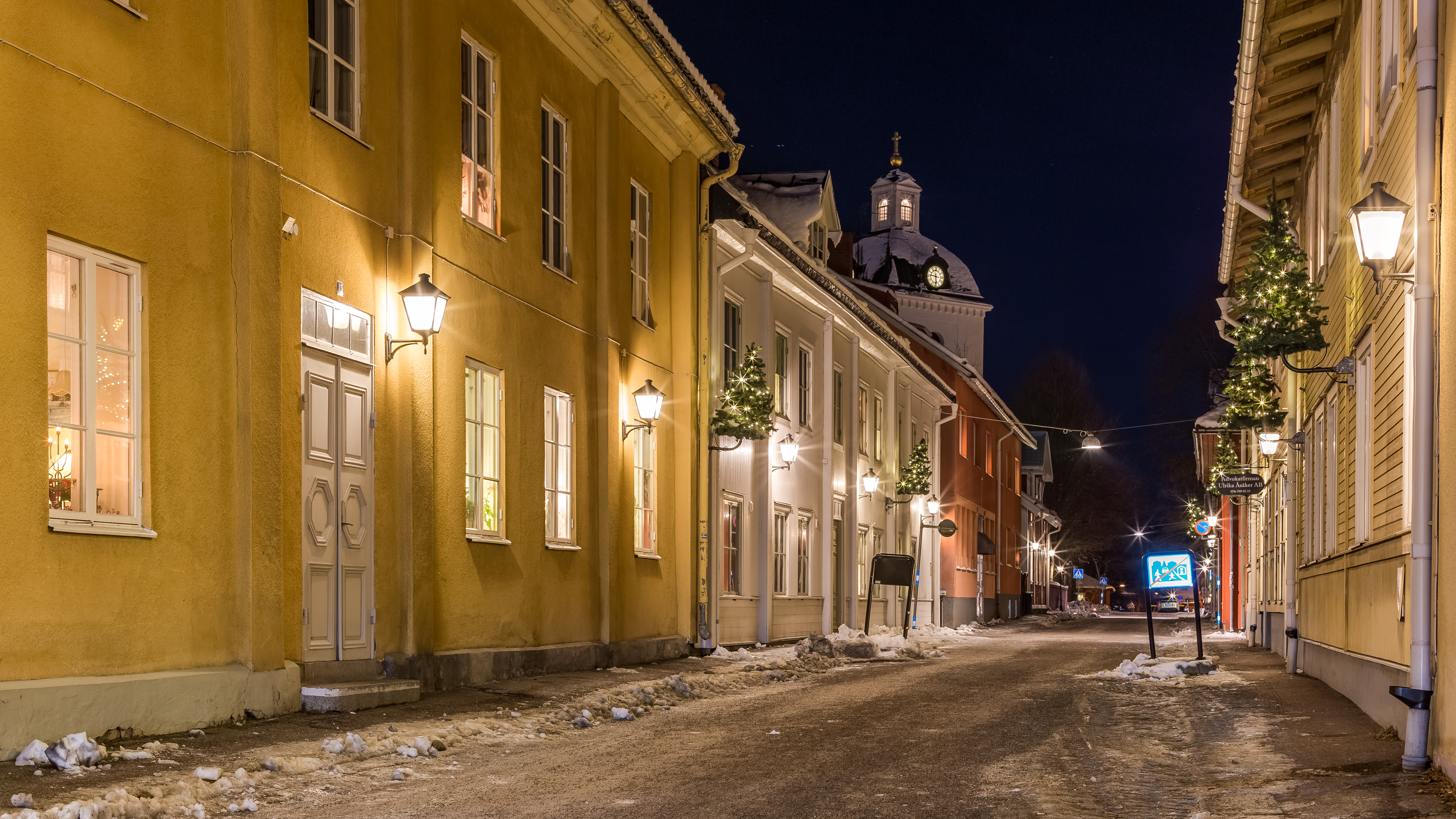
- Storgatan with Säter's church in background

- Location within Dalarna Location within Sweden
- Coordinates: 60°21′N 15°45′E
- Country: Sweden
- Province: Dalarna
- County: Dalarna County
- Municipality: Säter Municipality

Area
  - Total: 3.81 km^{2} (1.47 sq mi)

Population (31 December 2020)
  - Total: 11,161
  - Density: 1,164/km^{2} (3,010/sq mi)
- Time zone: UTC+1 (CET)
  - Summer (DST): UTC+2 (CEST)

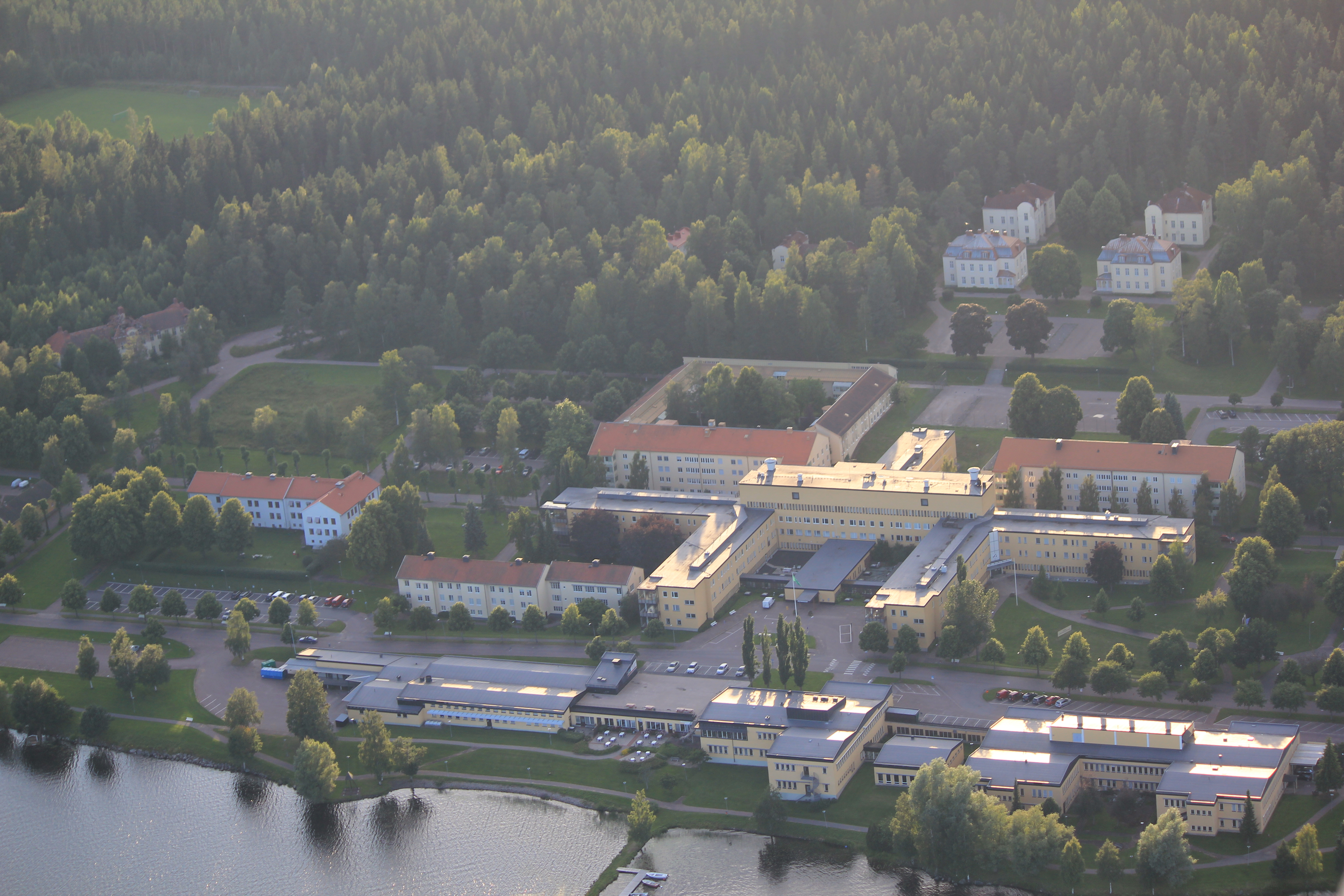
The Säter hospital

Säter is a locality and the seat of Säter Municipality, Dalarna County, Sweden, with 11,161 inhabitants in 2020.

Säter is, despite its small population, for historical reasons normally still referred to as a city. Statistics Sweden, however, only counts localities with more than 10,000 inhabitants as cities.

== History ==
At the location there was a royal mansion titled Säter's Royal Mansion.

Sweden's first copper mint was built at the location in 1624, influenced by its proximity to the copper mountain at Falun with its tannery that had been located in Säter a few years earlier.

The town Säter was founded in 1630, and much of its old town today has preserved wooden houses and street structure from that time, which few Swedish cities have. One of the oldest houses is the city hall.

On 8 May 1642, the town was chartered by Queen Christina of Sweden, making it one of the Cities in Sweden. The chosen coat of arms depicted a miner.

== Today ==
The Säter hospital was opened in 1912 and was at the time Sweden's largest mental hospital which is usually associated with Säter in particular.

== Sports ==
The following sports clubs are located in Säter:

- Säters IF FK

The ITU Long Distance Triathlon World Championships has been held in Säter twice.

== Travel ==
Säter has a railway station along the Dala Railway with trains to Mora, Falun, Arlanda Airport and Stockholm. Suitable airports for travelling to or from Säter are Borlänge Airport (20 km distance) and Arlanda Airport (177 km).

== International relations ==
=== Twin towns — Sister cities ===
Säter is twinned with: Joutseno, Finland and Laterza, Italy
