= Perssonska gården =

Building in Hedemora, Sweden

Coordinates: 60.2792°N 15.9883°E

Perssonska gården is a listed building in Hedemora, Dalarna County, Sweden. It was built 1849, after the second city fire, under the direction of Axel Reinhold Hulting. The name originates from Isidor Persson, who ran a hardware store in the building in the early 20th century.

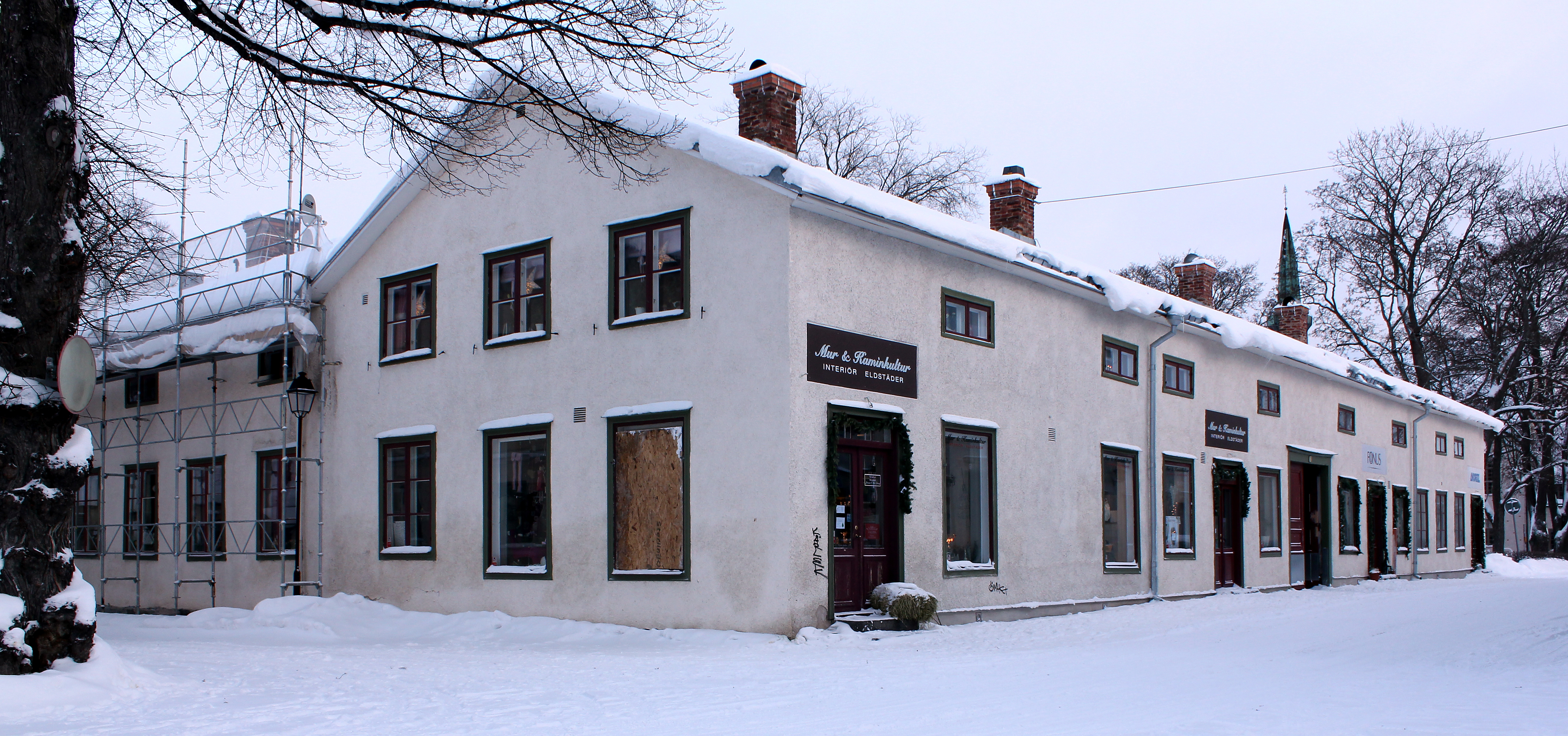

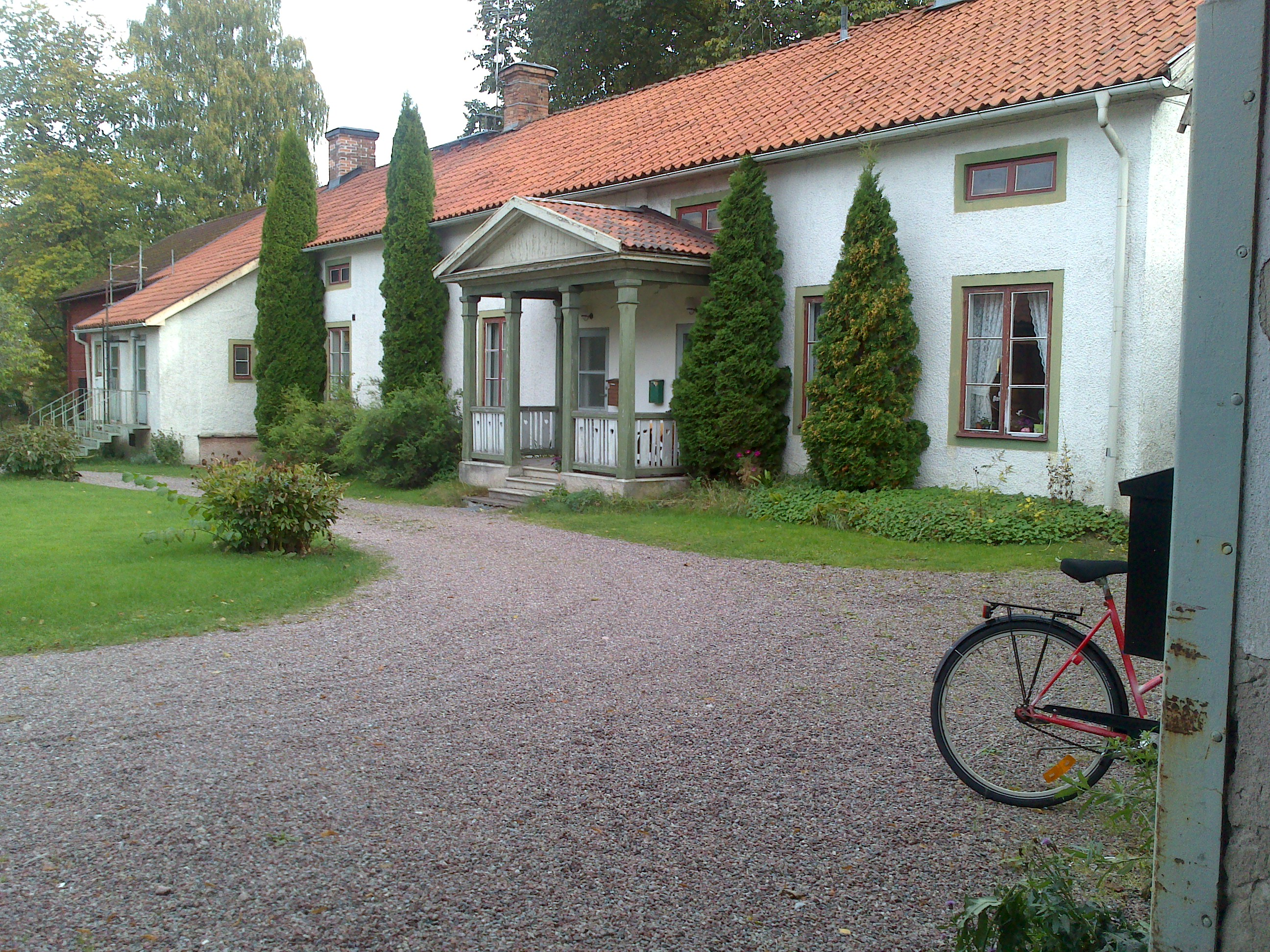

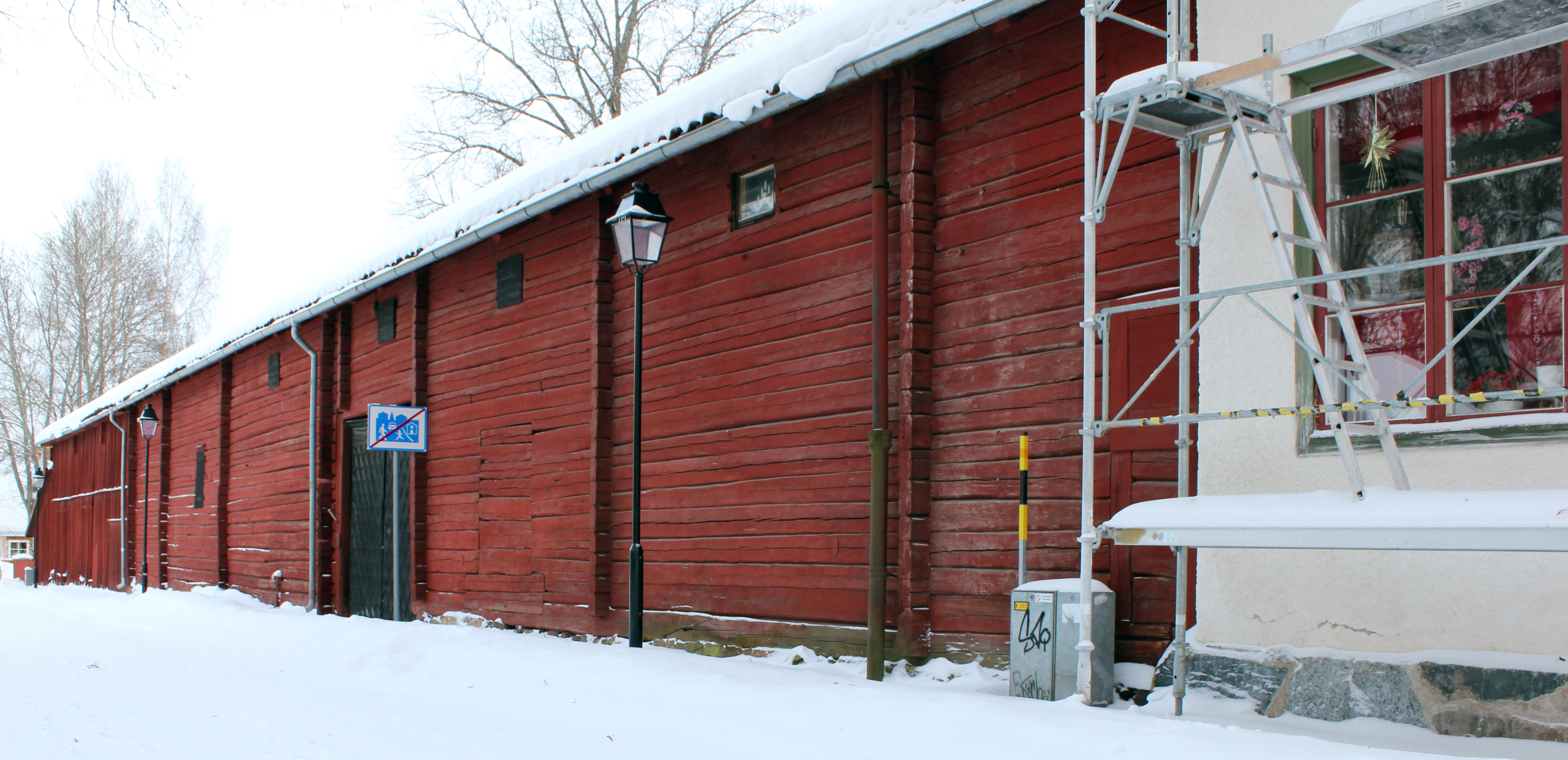
