= Tandövala =

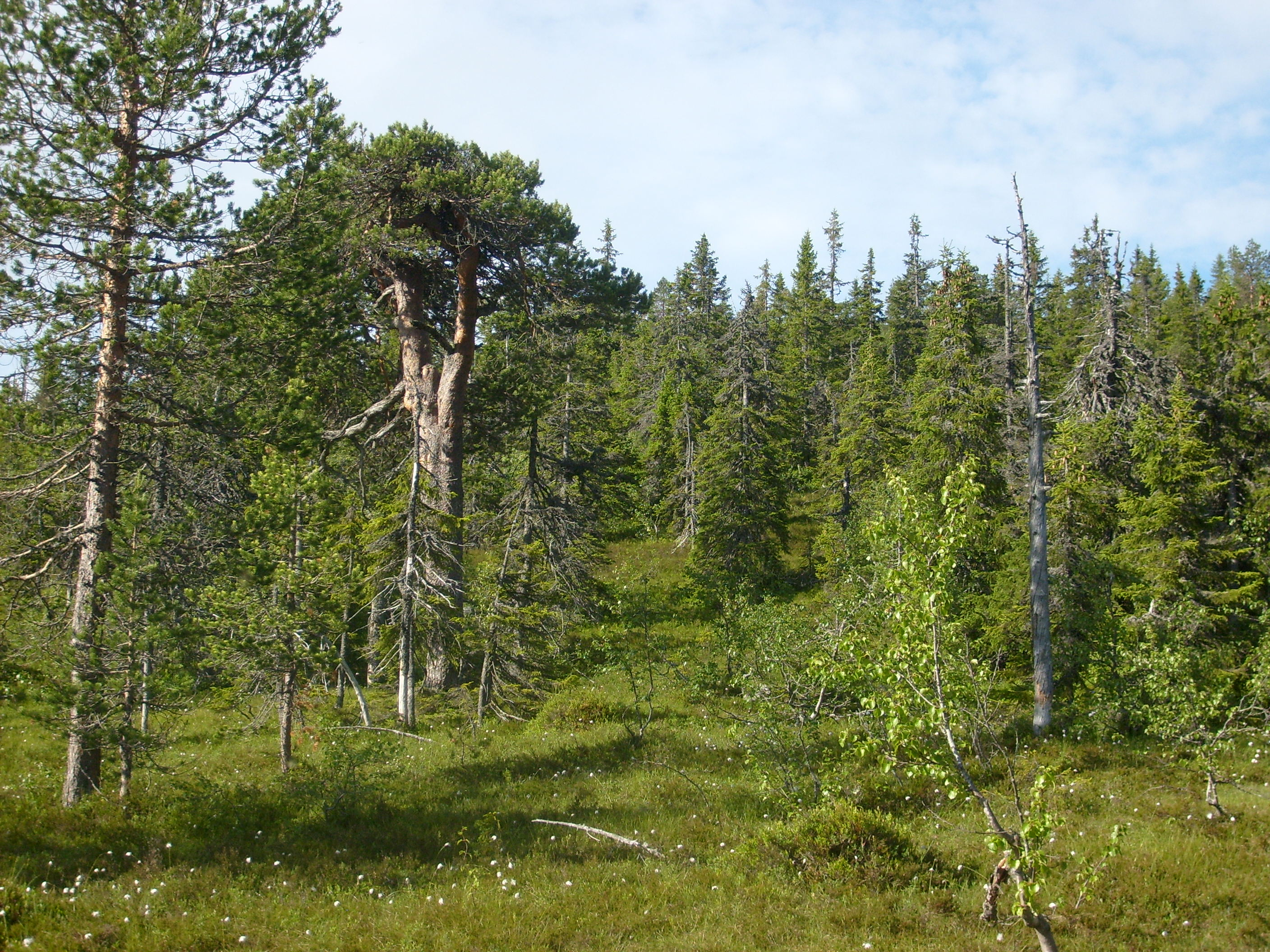

- Location within Dalarna
- Location: Sweden
- Nearest city: Falun
- Coordinates: 60°50′38″N 13°10′12″E
- Area: 3,498 ha (8,640 acres)
- Established: 1982

Tandövala is a nature reserve in Dalarna County, Sweden.

The nature reserve contains what is arguably the southernmost reaches of the Scandinavian Mountains in Sweden. The nature is barren and characterised by sparse vegetation, except for little valleys where old-growth forest thrive. The higher ground contains several species which here have their southernmost range in Sweden, including Alpine azalea, Alpine bearberry and Agrostis mertensii. Moss and lichen grow rather abundantly due to the high degree of air moisture. The nature reserve also supports a rich fauna and provides a habitat for species like European pine marten, stoat, brown bear, Eurasian lynx, gray wolf and wolverine. The bird life includes several species of owls and other birds of prey as well as Western capercaillie, black grouse and hazel grouse.

The nature reserve is part of the EU-wide Natura 2000-network.
