= Landlocked salmon (disambiguation) =

Landlocked salmon usually refers to the landlocked subspecies of the Atlantic salmon (Salmo salar sebago).

Other types of salmon spending their entire life cycle in freshwater include:

- Kokanee salmon, landlocked sockeye salmon
- Oncorhynchus masou formosanus, landlocked masu salmon

== See also ==
- Salmon
- Landlocked (disambiguation)
