= Tjolöholm Castle =

Country house in Halland, Sweden

Coordinates: 57°23′55″N 12°06′11″E

- Tjolöholms slott
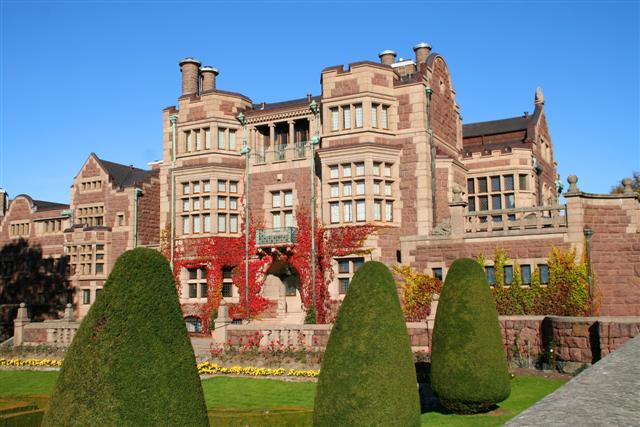
- Tjolöholms slott
- Interactive map of the Tjolöholm Castle area

General information
- Architectural style: Tudor
- Location: Kungsbacka, Sweden
- Construction started: 1898
- Completed: 1904

Design and construction
- Architect: Lars Israel Wahlman

Website
- Tjolöholm.se

Tjolöholm Castle (Swedish: Tjolöholms slott) is a country house in Halland, Sweden. It is located on a peninsula in the Kungsbacka Fjord on the Kattegat coast. The manor house was designed by architect Lars Israel Wahlman (1870–1952) in a style inspired by Tudor architecture and built between 1898 and 1904.

== History ==
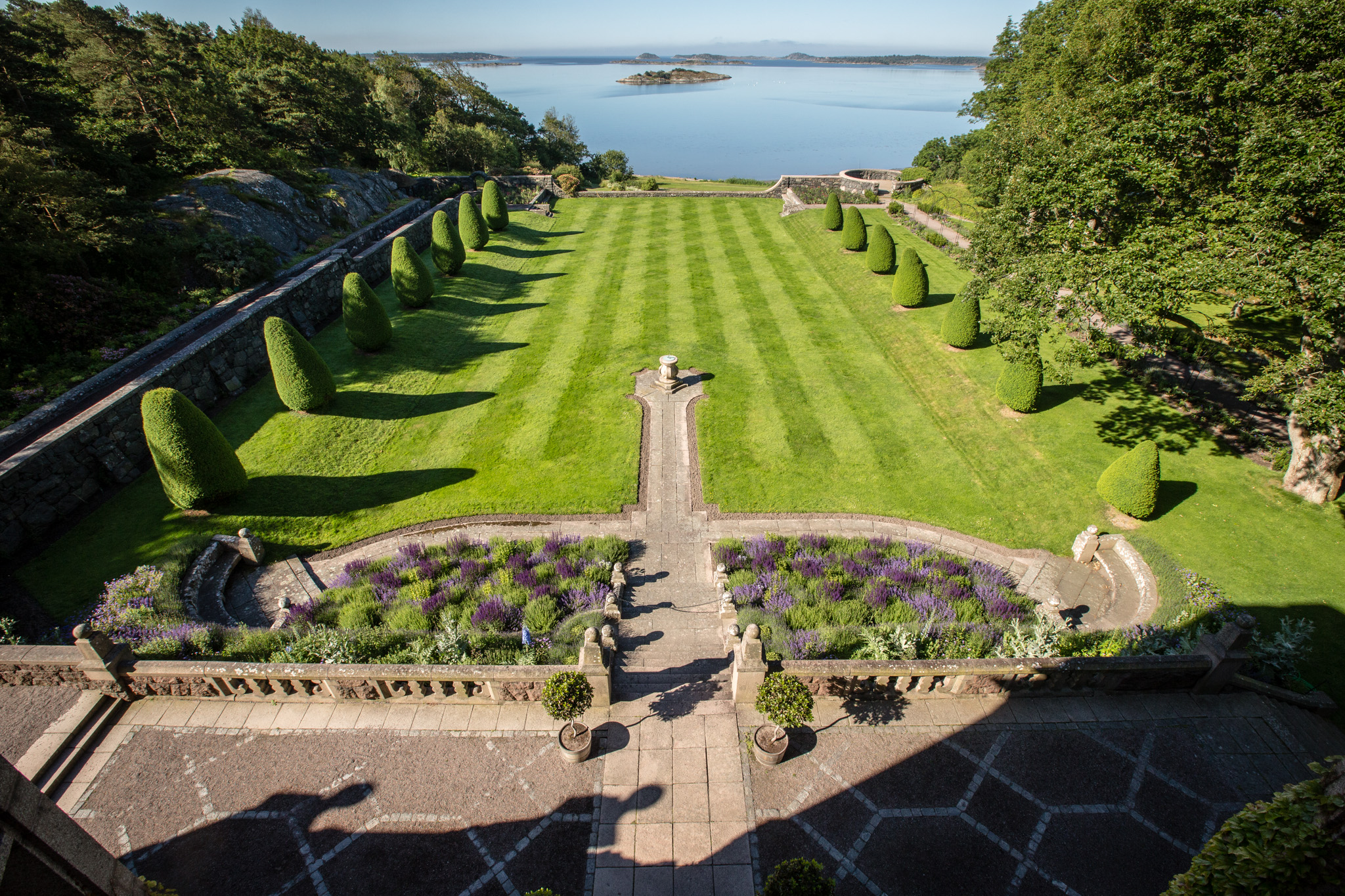
Tjolöholm grounds

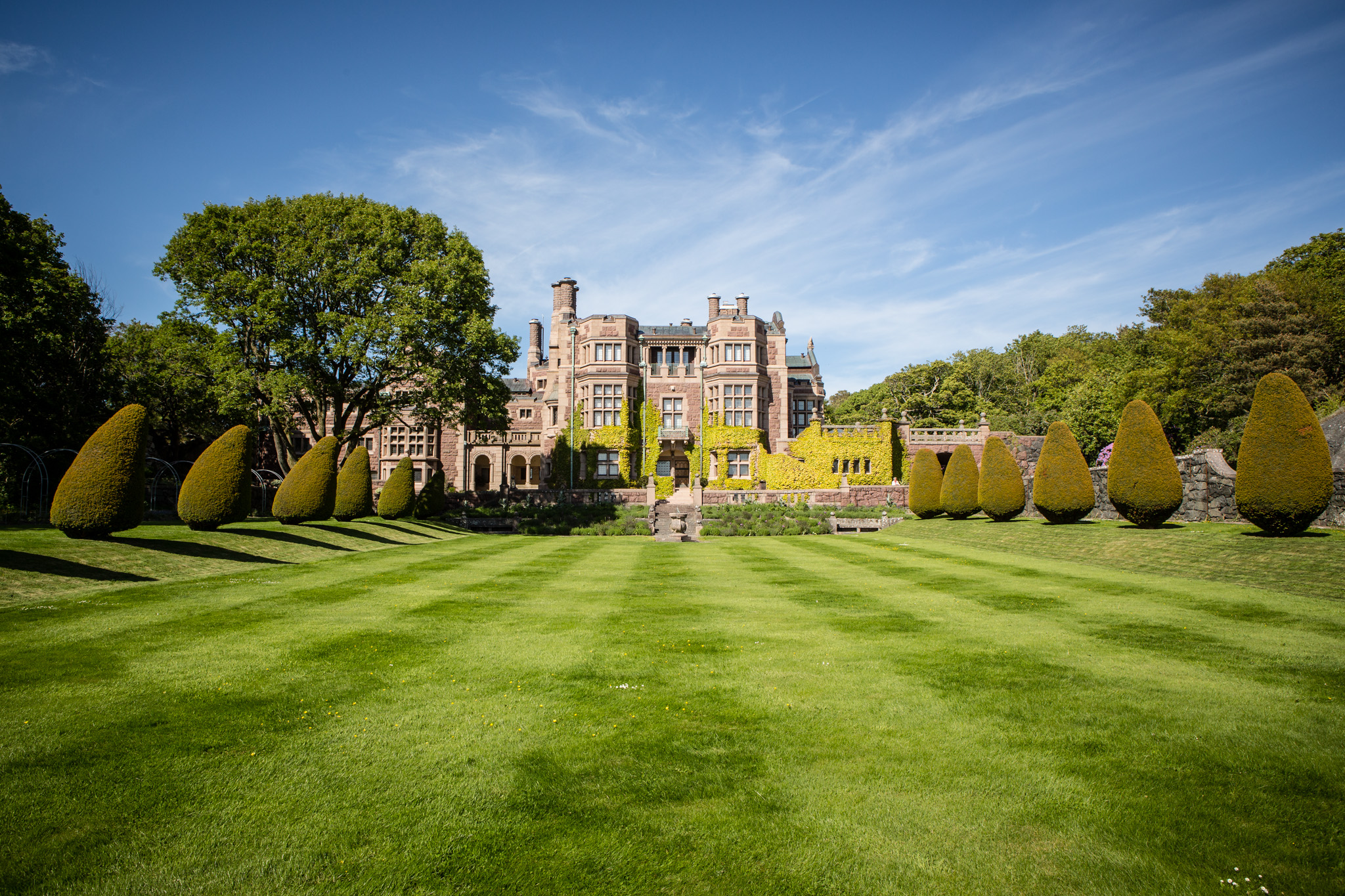
Tjolöholm front lawn

The Tjolöholm estate was bought in 1892 by James Fredrik Dickson (1844-1898). He was the son of James Jameson Dickson (1815–1885) founder of the Swedish shipping company, James Dickson & Co. James Fredrik Dickson was married to his cousin, Cecilia Blanche Charlotte Dickson (1856-1906). After Blanche Dickson died in 1906 the castle was inherited by their daughter Blanche Bonde (1875-1960) wife of Count Carl Bonde (1872–1957).

The manor house and surrounding acreage were purchased in 1964 by the city of Gothenburg, on the Swedish west coast, for use as a recreational reserve. From 1968 to 1973 renovations of the property and buildings were carried out. In 1971, parts of the castle were opened to visitors. In 1987 Tjolöholm was purchased by Kungsbacka Municipality and the foundation Västkuststiftelsen. In 1991, the property was transferred to the foundation Stiftelsen Tjolöholm which has Kungsbacka municipality as its principal. In 1991, it became a registered historic building.

The manor house is open for tours daily during the summer and weekends during the rest of the year. Throughout the year, the estate offers hotel rooms and operates a restaurant, cafe and banquet facilities. The short comedy film ″The Castle Tour″ with Swedish comedy group ″Galenskaparna och After Shave″ was recorded here. In 2010, Danish film director Lars von Trier shot the exterior scenes of the film Melancholia at the castle.
