= Säter Municipality =

Säter Municipality Säters kommun
- Municipality
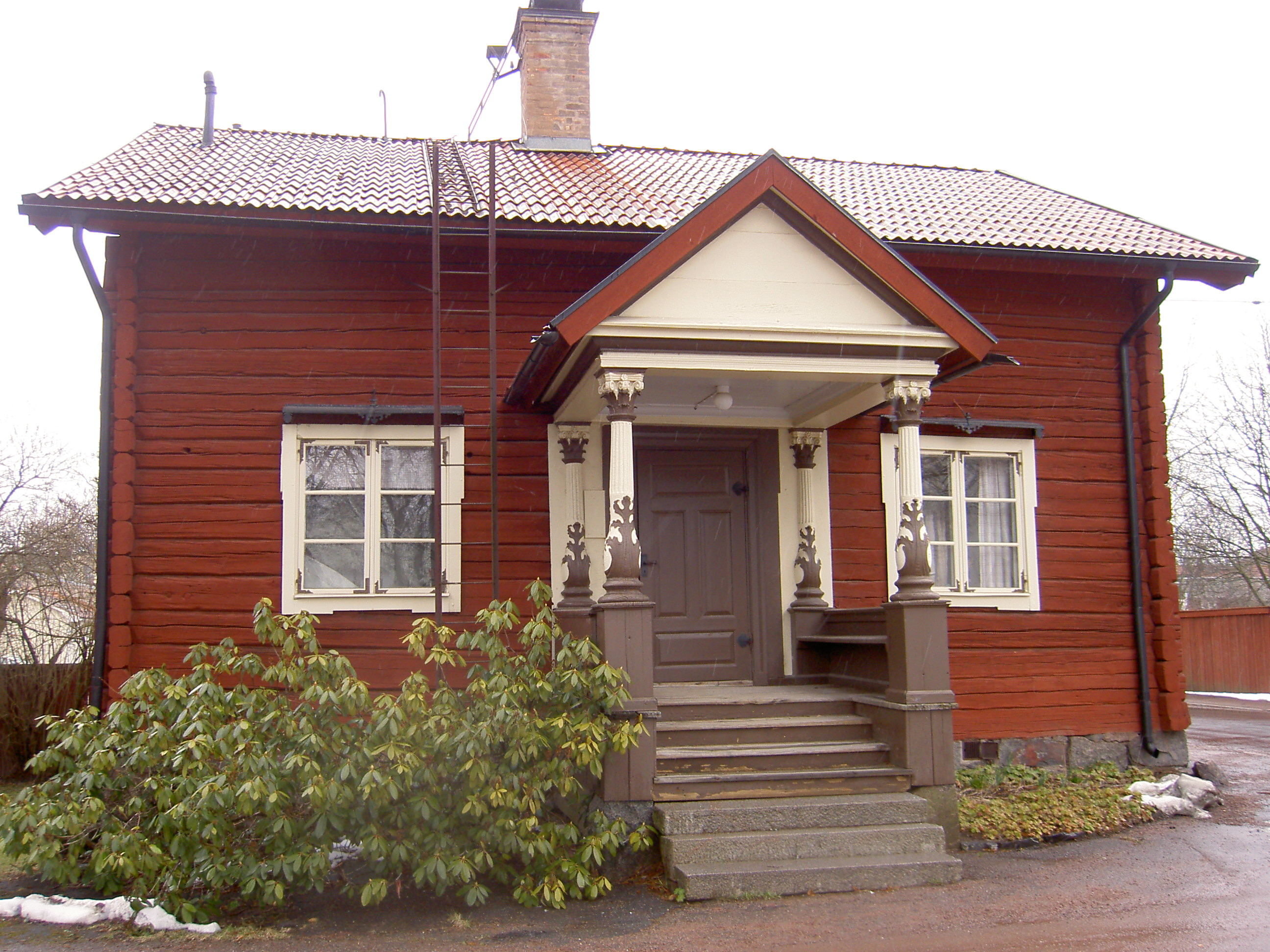

- Coat of arms

- Coordinates: 60°21′N 15°45′E
- Country: Sweden
- County: Dalarna County
- Seat: Säter

Area
  - Total: 624.51 km^{2} (241.12 sq mi)
  - Land: 570.33 km^{2} (220.21 sq mi)
  - Water: 54.18 km^{2} (20.92 sq mi)
- Area as of 1 January 2014

Population (30 June 2025)
  - Total: 11,245
  - Density: 19.717/km^{2} (51.066/sq mi)
- Time zone: UTC+1 (CET)
  - Summer (DST): UTC+2 (CEST)
- ISO 3166 code: SE
- Province: Dalarna
- Municipal code: 2082
- Website: www.sater.se
- Density is calculated using land area only.

Säter Municipality (Swedish: Säters kommun) is one of the 290 municipalities of Sweden in Dalarna County in central Sweden. Its seat is located in the town of Säter.

The present municipality was created in 1971 with the amalgamation of the former City of Säter and two neighbouring municipalities.

== Geography ==
Säter is known for the Säter Valley. It is about 5 kilometers long and has a dense vegetation and steeps. On its bottom the Ljuster stream flows. The valley is popular for walking.

=== Localities ===
Population centers in Säter Municipality:

- Mora
- Naglarby och Enbacka
- Säter (seat)
- Skedvi kyrkby
- Solvarbo

== Demographics ==
This is a demographic table based on Säter Municipality's electoral districts in the 2022 Swedish general election sourced from SVT's election platform, in turn taken from SCB official statistics.

Residents include everyone registered as living in the district, regardless of age or citizenship status. Valid voters indicate Swedish citizens above the age of 18 who therefore can vote in general elections. Left vote and right vote indicate the result between the two major blocs in said district in the 2022 general election. Employment indicates the share of people between the ages of 20 and 64 who are working taxpayers. Foreign background is defined as residents either born abroad or with two parents born outside of Sweden. Median income is the received monthly income through either employment, capital gains or social grants for the median adult above 20, also including pensioners in Swedish kronor. The section about college graduates indicates any degree accumulated after high school.

In total there were 11,232 residents, including 8,789 Swedish citizens of voting age. 46.3 % voted for the left coalition and 52.4 % for the right coalition. Indicators are in percentage points except population totals and income.

| Location | Residents | Citizen adults | Left vote | Right vote | Employed | Swedish parents | Foreign heritage | Income SEK | Degree |
| Location | | | % | % | | | | | |
|---|---|---|---|---|---|---|---|---|---|
| Gustafs N | 2,014 | 1,565 | 42.5 | 56.5 | 89 | 95 | 5 | 27,680 | 35 |
| Gustafs S | 1,308 | 1,030 | 42.4 | 56.6 | 85 | 92 | 8 | 26,278 | 31 |
| Stora Skedvi | 2,267 | 1,825 | 38.8 | 59.6 | 88 | 93 | 7 | 25,086 | 31 |
| Säter 1 | 1,758 | 1,375 | 56.2 | 42.4 | 73 | 81 | 19 | 22,183 | 32 |
| Säter 2 | 1,688 | 1,292 | 51.1 | 47.3 | 82 | 87 | 13 | 24,090 | 37 |
| Säter 3 | 2,197 | 1,702 | 48.9 | 50.2 | 85 | 92 | 8 | 26,711 | 32 |
Source: SVT

== Riksdag elections ==
| Year | % | Votes | V | S | MP | C | L | KD | M | SD | NyD | Left | Right |
|---|---|---|---|---|---|---|---|---|---|---|---|---|---|
| 1973 | 90.5 | 6,376 | 3.0 | 40.4 | | 39.9 | 6.5 | 2.8 | 7.0 | | | 43.3 | 53.5 |
| 1976 | 92.0 | 6,989 | 2.9 | 39.4 | | 39.9 | 7.0 | 2.2 | 8.3 | | | 42.3 | 55.3 |
| 1979 | 90.4 | 7,007 | 4.2 | 41.0 | | 33.3 | 6.0 | 2.2 | 12.9 | | | 45.2 | 52.1 |
| 1982 | 91.4 | 7,374 | 3.9 | 43.4 | 1.7 | 27.6 | 4.1 | 1.8 | 17.4 | | | 47.3 | 49.1 |
| 1985 | 89.3 | 7,344 | 4.5 | 43.1 | 1.6 | 23.1 | 11.4 | | 16.1 | | | 47.6 | 50.6 |
| 1988 | 84.6 | 6,970 | 5.2 | 42.0 | 5.3 | 22.0 | 10.0 | 3.3 | 12.2 | | | 52.4 | 44.2 |
| 1991 | 86.5 | 7,363 | 4.5 | 35.5 | 2.9 | 17.2 | 6.2 | 7.4 | 16.5 | | 8.5 | 40.0 | 47.4 |
| 1994 | 86.4 | 7,349 | 6.9 | 43.6 | 5.3 | 15.9 | 4.9 | 3.9 | 16.9 | | 1.6 | 55.7 | 41.6 |
| 1998 | 82.1 | 7,401 | 14.5 | 34.4 | 4.2 | 11.7 | 2.8 | 12.7 | 17.1 | | | 53.1 | 44.3 |
| 2002 | 77.8 | 6,693 | 9.8 | 39.3 | 4.0 | 15.6 | 8.3 | 8.5 | 11.7 | 0.9 | | 53.1 | 44.1 |
| 2006 | 81.2 | 6,739 | 6.7 | 37.3 | 3.8 | 15.5 | 4.9 | 5.6 | 20.0 | 2.5 | | 47.9 | 46.0 |
| 2010 | 83.6 | 7,085 | 5.7 | 33.8 | 4.9 | 11.7 | 4.6 | 4.2 | 26.2 | 7.8 | | 44.3 | 46.7 |
| 2014 | 87.3 | 7,405 | 5.4 | 33.6 | 3.8 | 10.4 | 2.9 | 3.2 | 18.6 | 18.8 | | 42.8 | 35.2 |
| 2018 | 88.9 | 7,610 | 6.3 | 29.8 | 2.5 | 12.4 | 3.1 | 6.2 | 17.0 | 21.7 | | 51.0 | 47.9 |

== Sights ==
The Old Church of Stora Skedvi is one of Dalarna's oldest, with its oldest parts from the 13th century.

There are several remains from the province's mining history, such as the Östra Silvberg's Mining Area with a silver mining history traced to the 1480s with an adjacent cemetery and chapel. It was closed in the 19th century and the mine itself is today a water filled hole.

Bispbergs gruva was used for mining iron for over 600 years, until it was closed in 1967.
