= Landlocked (disambiguation) =

A landlocked country is a country that does not have territory adjoining an ocean.

Landlocked may also refer to:

- Landlocked (novel), a 1965 novel by Doris Lessing, fourth in the series Children of Violence
- Landlocked, working title for the 1971 Beach Boys album Surf's Up
- Landlocked, working title for the 1972 Beach Boys album Carl and the Passions – "So Tough"
- Landlocked, 1992 album by Australian musician Chris Wilson
- Landlocked Film Festival, an annual film festival hosted in Iowa City, Iowa, U.S.

== See also ==
- Landlocked parcel, a real estate plot that has no legal access to a public right of way
- Landlocked salmon (disambiguation)
