= Avesta Municipality =

Avesta Municipality Avesta kommun
- Municipality
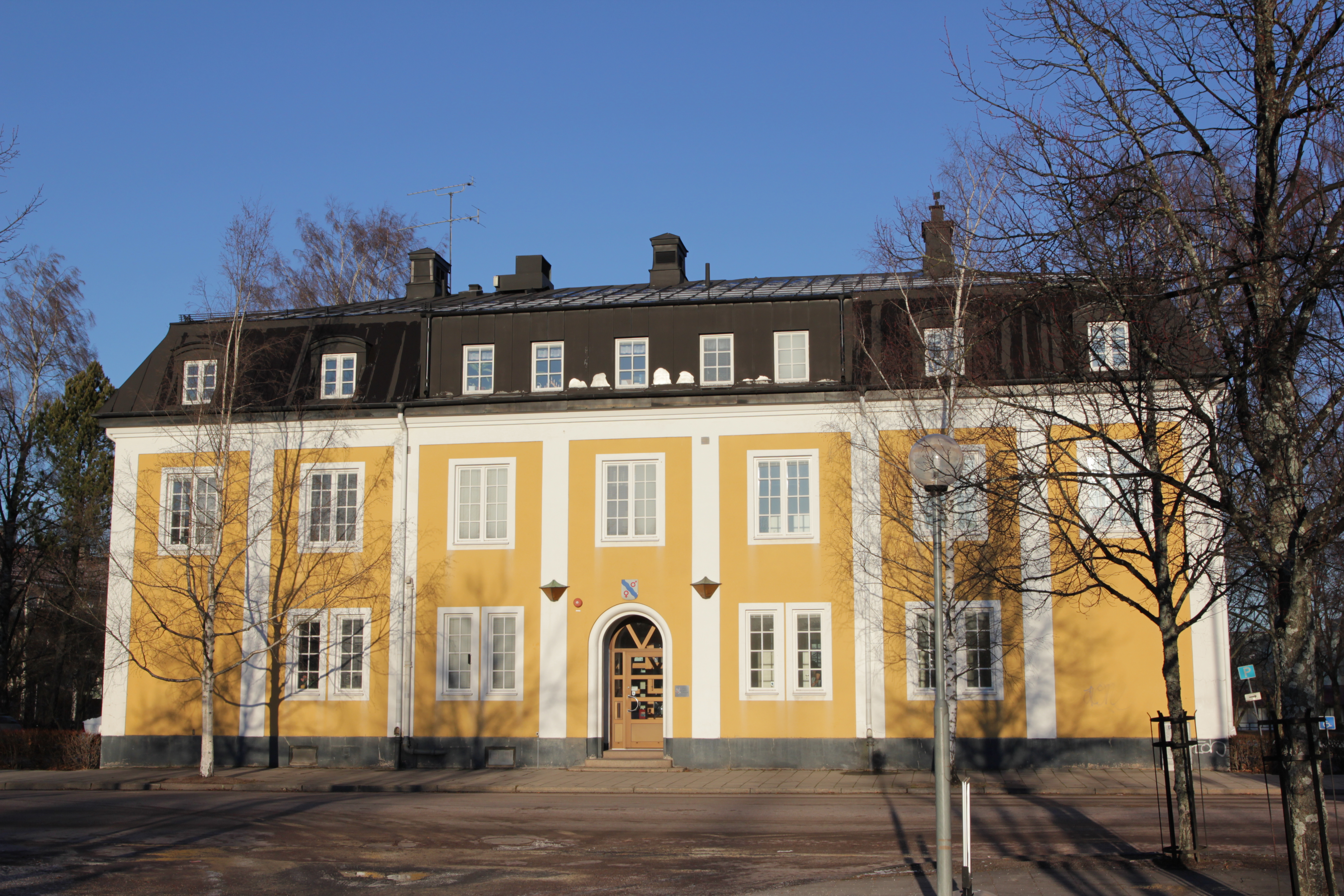
- Avesta town hall

- Coat of arms

- Coordinates: 60°09′N 16°12′E
- Country: Sweden
- County: Dalarna County
- Seat: Avesta

Area
  - Total: 669.08 km^{2} (258.33 sq mi)
  - Land: 613.25 km^{2} (236.78 sq mi)
  - Water: 55.83 km^{2} (21.56 sq mi)
- Area as of 1 January 2014

Population (30 June 2025)
  - Total: 22,468
  - Density: 36.638/km^{2} (94.891/sq mi)
- Time zone: UTC+1 (CET)
  - Summer (DST): UTC+2 (CEST)
- ISO 3166 code: SE
- Province: Dalarna
- Municipal code: 2084
- Website: www.avesta.se
- Density is calculated using land area only.

Avesta Municipality (Swedish: Avesta kommun) is one of 290 municipalities of Sweden. It is in Dalarna County, in the central part of the country, and its seat is in the town of Avesta.

The municipality in its present size was created in 1967 when the four surrounding municipalities were joined with the then City of Avesta. In 1971 it became a municipality of unitary type.

== Geography ==
Avesta borders to the municipalities of:

- Hedemora in Dalarna,
- Hofors and Sandviken in Gävleborg County,
- Norberg and Sala in Västmanland County

=== Localities ===
- Avesta (the seat)
- Krylbo (part of the seat Avesta.)
- Horndal
- Fors

== Sports ==
Speedway: The most successful sport team in Avesta is their speedway team Masarna, translating to "the men of Dalecarlia", competing in the highest division in Sweden.
Football: Avesta AIK, Krylbo IF
Ladies' handball: Avesta Brovallen HF
Ice hockey: Avesta BK

== Notability ==
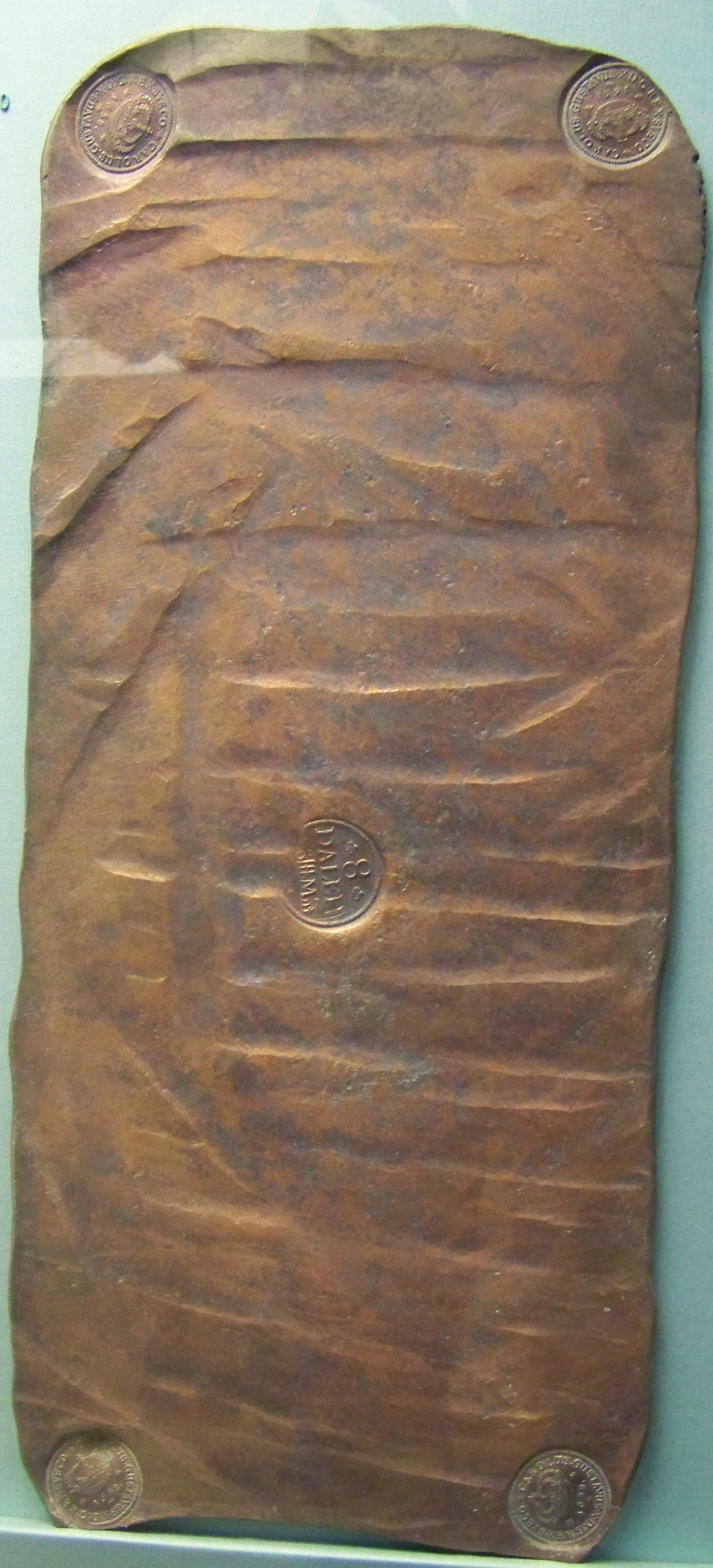
A large 8 daler copper plate from 1658 (the British Museum)

From 1644 to 1776, Avesta was the largest part of the Swedish Mint, manufacturing mainly copper plate money. The world's largest – a 10 daler plate – is exhibited in the Avesta Myntmuseum, and weighs 19.4 kilograms (43 lb).

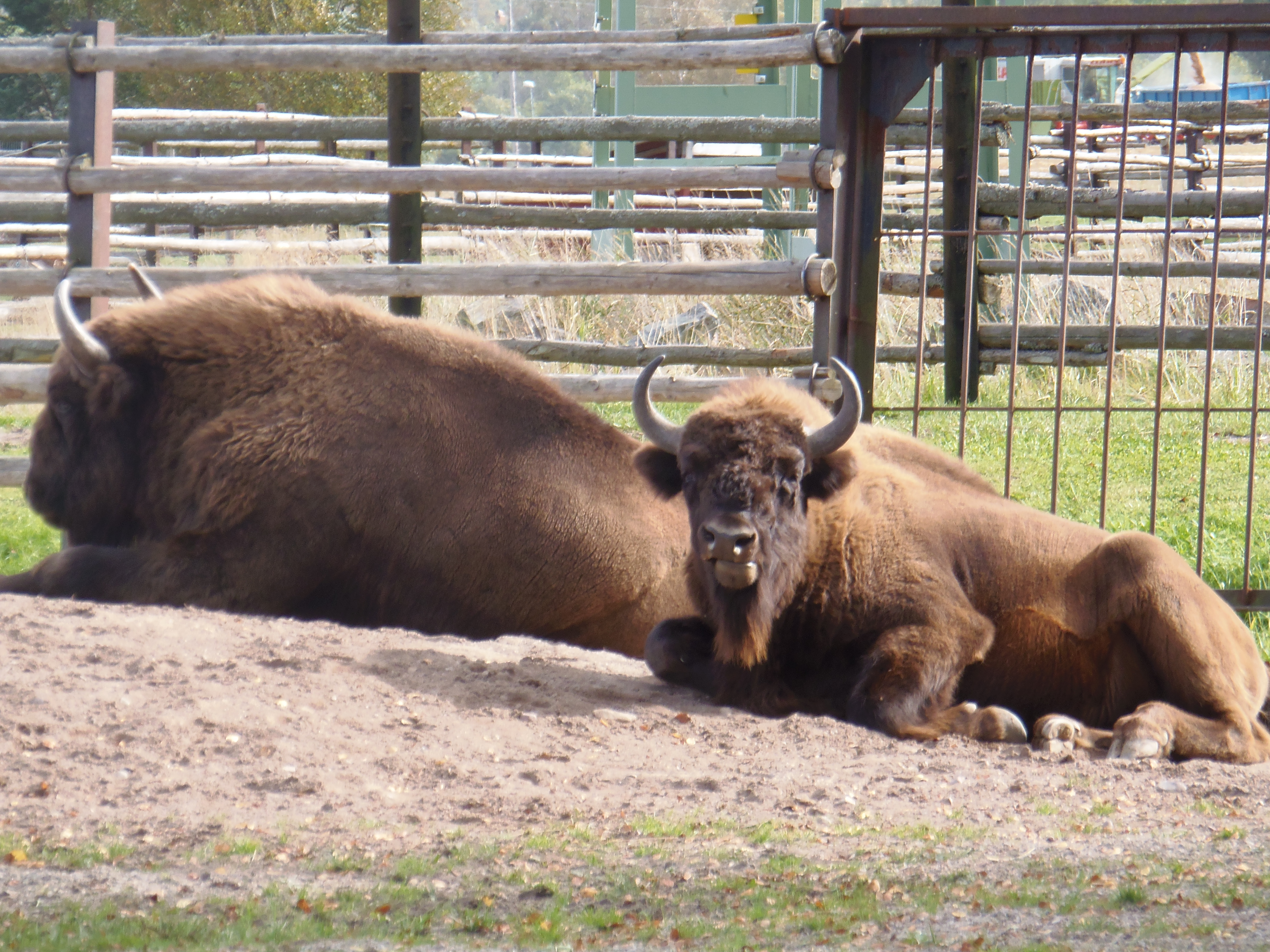
European bison (wisent) in captivity, Avesta Visentpark, Dalarna, Sweden.

In Stubbsveden, just west of the town Avesta, is a wildlife park for European bison (wisent). Guided tours are conducted around and in between the confinements in the summer season. Occasionally, individuals from this and other Swedish animal parks are relocated to the reserve herds in Poland and Romania to widen their DNA pool.

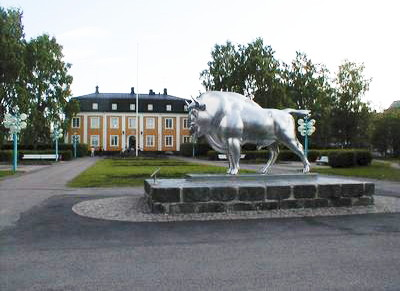
Wisent statue made of stainless steel, located in Avesta City park

The city's largest industry is its steel mill, today owned by the Finnish company Outokumpu Oyj. Iron production started here in the 16th century, was industrialized in the 17th, but was surpassed by the copper-plate-producing Swedish Mint factory from 1644. However, production was maintained during the centuries, and in 1823 a forge was added. In 1924, production of stainless, acid-proof, and fire-resistive steels was initiated. In the 1960s, these were still the main products, but twenty years later, the cold- and hot-rolled stainless qualities dominated. In 1991, British Steel Stainless merged with the Avesta firm, and in 2001 Outokumpu took over the majority of the ownership.

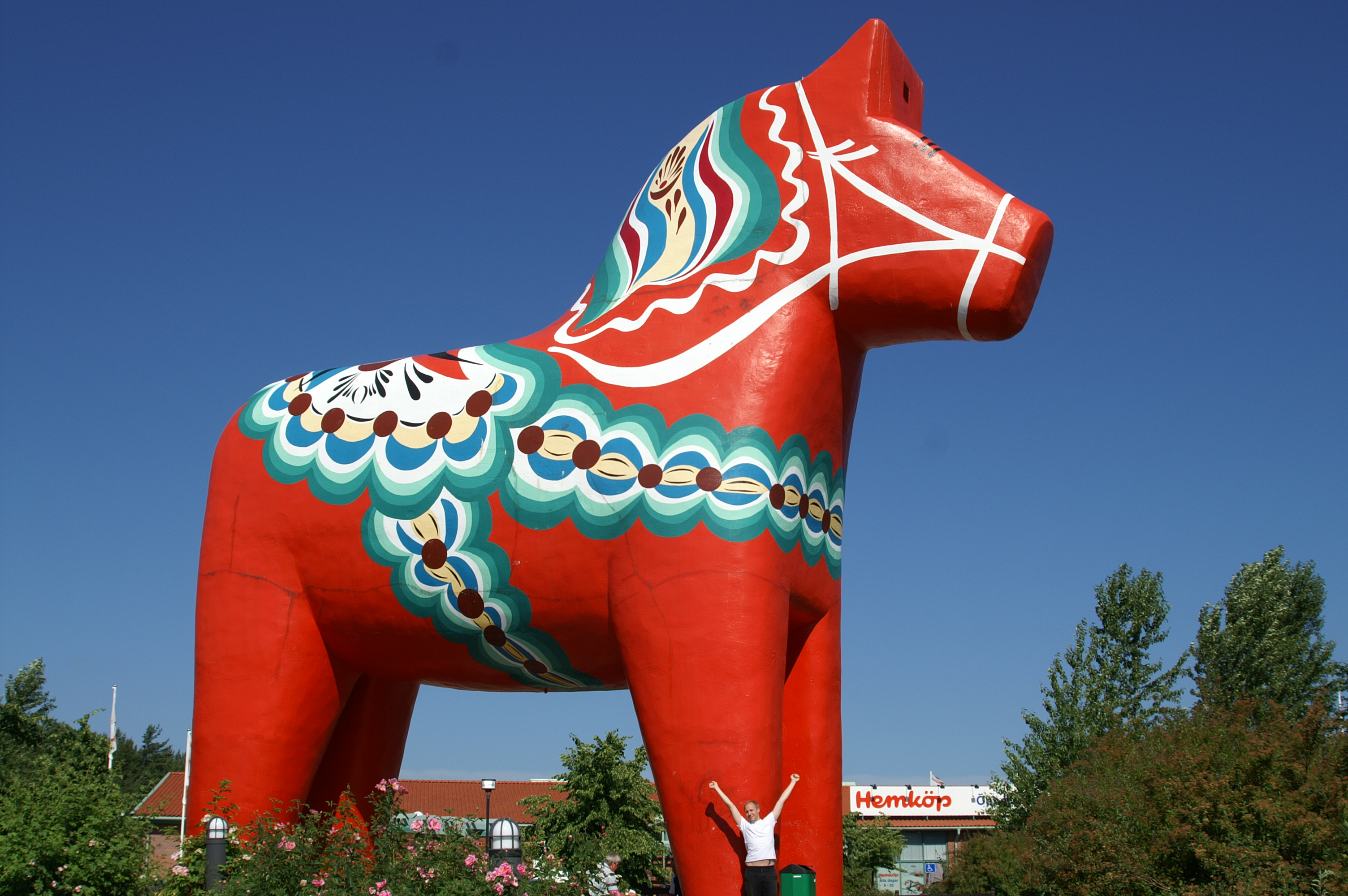
The World's largest dalahäst.

The largest Dalecarlian horse (Dalahäst) in the world is located in Avesta. It is 13 metres (43 ft) tall and weighs 67 tons.

== Notable natives ==
- Mats Åhlberg, ice hockey player, born 1947 in Avesta.
- Pär Aron Borg (1776–1839), pedagogue for the blind and deaf, born in Avesta.
- Mattias Ekström, racing driver, born 1978 in Falun, raised in Snickarbo, Avesta municipality.
- Calle Jularbo, Karl Oskar Jularbo (1893–1966) born Karlsson. Accordionist and composer, raised in Östanbyn, Avesta.
- Lina Hurtig (born 1995), football player for Sweden.
- Erik Axel Karlfeldt (1864–1931), poet, author, and Nobel laureate. Born in Karlbo, Avesta.
- Nicklas Lidström, ice hockey player (NHL), born in Krylbo, Avesta municipality.
- Carl Martin Norberg, gymnast and Olympic gold medalist, born 1886 in Avesta.
- Maja Nylén Persson, ice hockey player (SDHL), born in 2000 in Avesta.
- Tony Rickardsson, rally driver, and former speedway driver (six times a World Champion). Born 1970 in Avesta.
- Ola Salo, born as Rolf Ola Anders Svensson. Singer and composer, born 1977 in Avesta. Founding member of The Ark.
- Lars-Inge Svartenbrandt, criminal.
- Scar Symmetry, metal band.
- Dan Söderström, ice hockey player, born 1948 in Horndal, Avesta municipality.
- Tommy Vestlund, ice hockey player for the Carolina Hurricanes, born 1974 in Fors, Avesta municipality.

== Economy ==
Municipality is rich on natural resources in form of Ore, Forest, and Water. Avesta is also home to Outokumpu stainless steel mill, which is the largest private employer in the municipality.

== Demographics ==
This is a demographic table based on Avesta Municipality's electoral districts in the 2022 Swedish general election sourced from SVT's election platform, in turn taken from SCB official statistics.

In total there were 22,893 inhabitants, including 17,253 Swedish citizens of voting age. 47.4 % voted for the left coalition and 51.2 % for the right coalition. Indicators are in percentage points except population totals and income.

Location	Residents	Citizen adults	Left vote	Right vote	Employed	Swedish parents	Foreign heritage	Income SEK	Degree
Location			%	%					
Avesta C	2,019	1,643	53.4	45.2	76	68	32	22,387	28
Avesta N	2,255	1,762	49.1	49.9	82	79	21	25,508	30
Avesta S	2,016	1,581	52.7	44.6	73	65	35	21,412	27
Avesta V	2,337	1,607	48.6	49.8	73	67	33	23,826	27
By	1,047	872	44.1	54.9	82	91	9	23,486	28
Folkärna	1,598	1,240	41.2	57.7	86	91	9	27,764	31
Fors	1,244	1,002	43.4	55.1	86	89	11	27,571	29
Horndal	1,372	1,002	47.2	51.0	71	81	19	21,860	21
Karlbo	2,110	1,620	42.2	56.9	84	87	13	26,763	27
Krylbo	2,479	1,495	54.0	42.9	53	51	49	16,717	21
Skogsbo C	2,201	1,724	47.3	52.1	87	88	12	25,938	29
Skogsbo N	2,215	1,705	42.2	57.1	89	92	8	29,948	31
Source: SVT

== Politics ==
=== Riksdag ===
This table lists the national results at Avesta's municipal level since the 1972 Swedish municipality reform. The results of the Sweden Democrats from 1988 to 1998 were not published by the SCB at a municipal level due to the party's small size nationally at the time.

Year	%	Votes	V	S	MP	C	L	KD	M	SD	NyD	Left	Right
1973	91.7	17,543	6.4	54.1		26.7	5.0	2.0	5.2			60.4	36.9
1976	92.3	18,178	4.9	55.9		24.6	6.4	1.6	6.2			60.7	37.2
1979	91.8	17,989	5.7	57.0		19.5	6.2	1.7	9.4			62.7	35.1
1982	92.8	18,014	5.9	58.9	1.5	16.5	3.5	1.7	11.9			64.7	31.9
1985	90.1	17,284	5.9	58.0	1.6	14.3	8.8		11.3			63.9	34.3
1988	86.0	16,178	7.4	55.5	4.2	13.0	7.8	2.9	8.5			67.2	29.4
1991	85.9	16,034	6.1	50.1	2.4	11.6	5.7	5.7	11.8		5.9	56.3	34.7
1994	86.1	15,731	7.9	56.5	4.6	10.1	4.6	3.0	11.9		0.7	68.9	29.7
1998	80.8	14,159	14.8	46.7	4.3	6.7	2.7	9.4	13.5			65.8	32.3
2002	77.4	13,254	9.7	50.0	3.5	9.5	8.8	7.0	9.6	0.8		63.3	34.8
2006	80.6	13,734	6.6	46.1	3.4	8.4	4.9	4.4	19.3	4.0		56.2	37.0
2010	83.7	14,345	5.4	44.1	5.0	6.3	4.8	3.5	22.9	7.2		54.4	37.4
2014	86.0	14,654	5.6	41.8	3.6	5.3	3.1	3.0	15.4	19.4		50.9	27.2
2018	86.7	14,573	6.5	34.8	2.2	6.8	2.9	5.0	15.8	24.7		50.3	48.4
