= Vikarbyn =

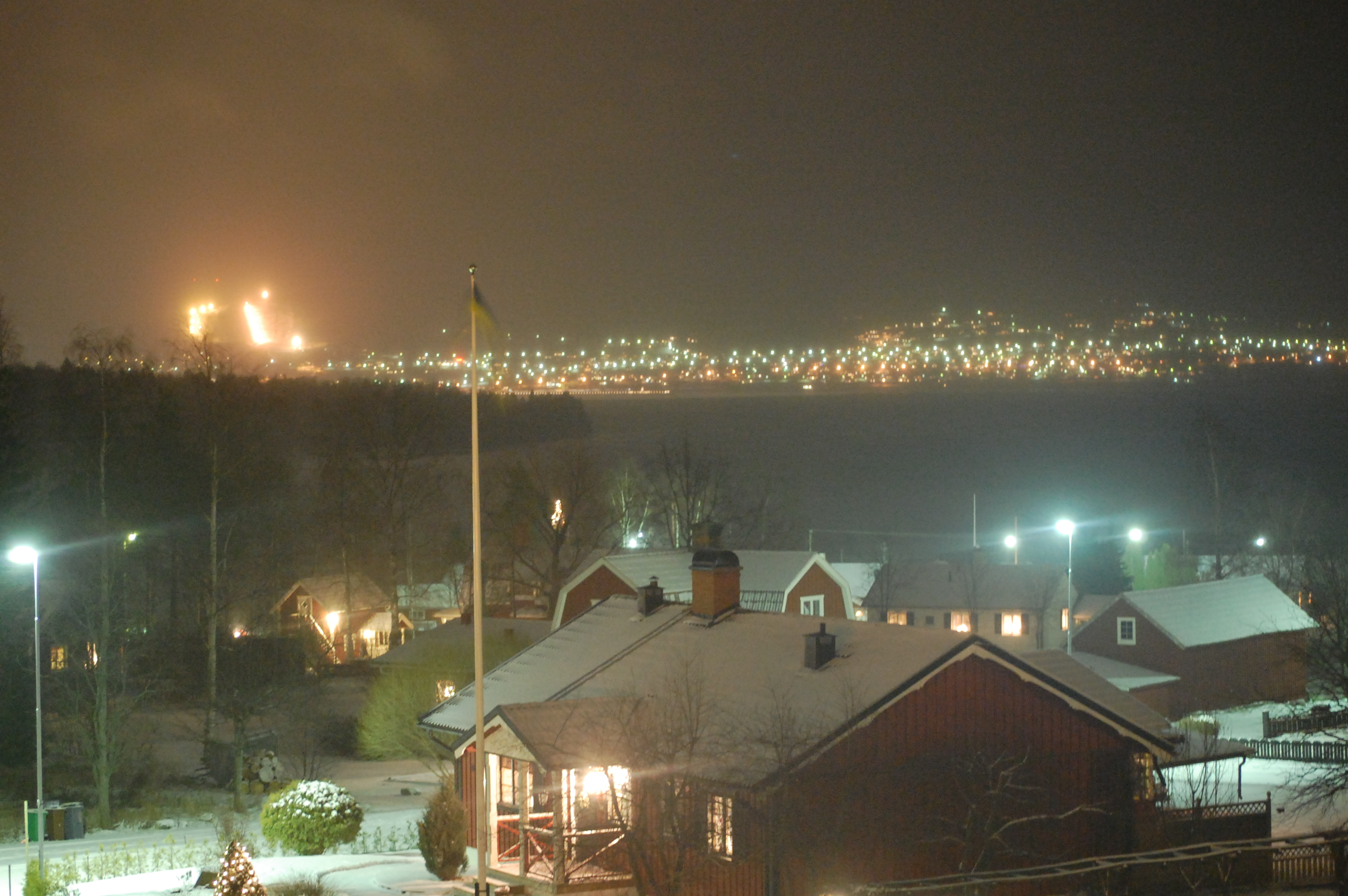

- Location within Dalarna Location within Sweden
- Coordinates: 60°54′33″N 15°01′15″E
- Country: Sweden
- Province: Dalarna
- County: Dalarna County
- Municipality: Rättvik Municipality

Area
  - Total: 2.57 km^{2} (0.99 sq mi)

Population (31 December 2010)
  - Total: 1,171
  - Density: 456/km^{2} (1,180/sq mi)
- Time zone: UTC+1 (CET)
  - Summer (DST): UTC+2 (CEST)

Vikarbyn is a locality situated in Rättvik Municipality, Dalarna County, Sweden with 1,171 inhabitants in 2010. Vikarbyn is situated by lake Siljan.

In Vikarbyn, there is a school for pupils aged 7–11 years, a grocery store, a restaurant and two furnishing shops.
