= Dalarna County =

County (län) of Sweden

Dalarna County Dalarnas län (Swedish)
- County of Sweden
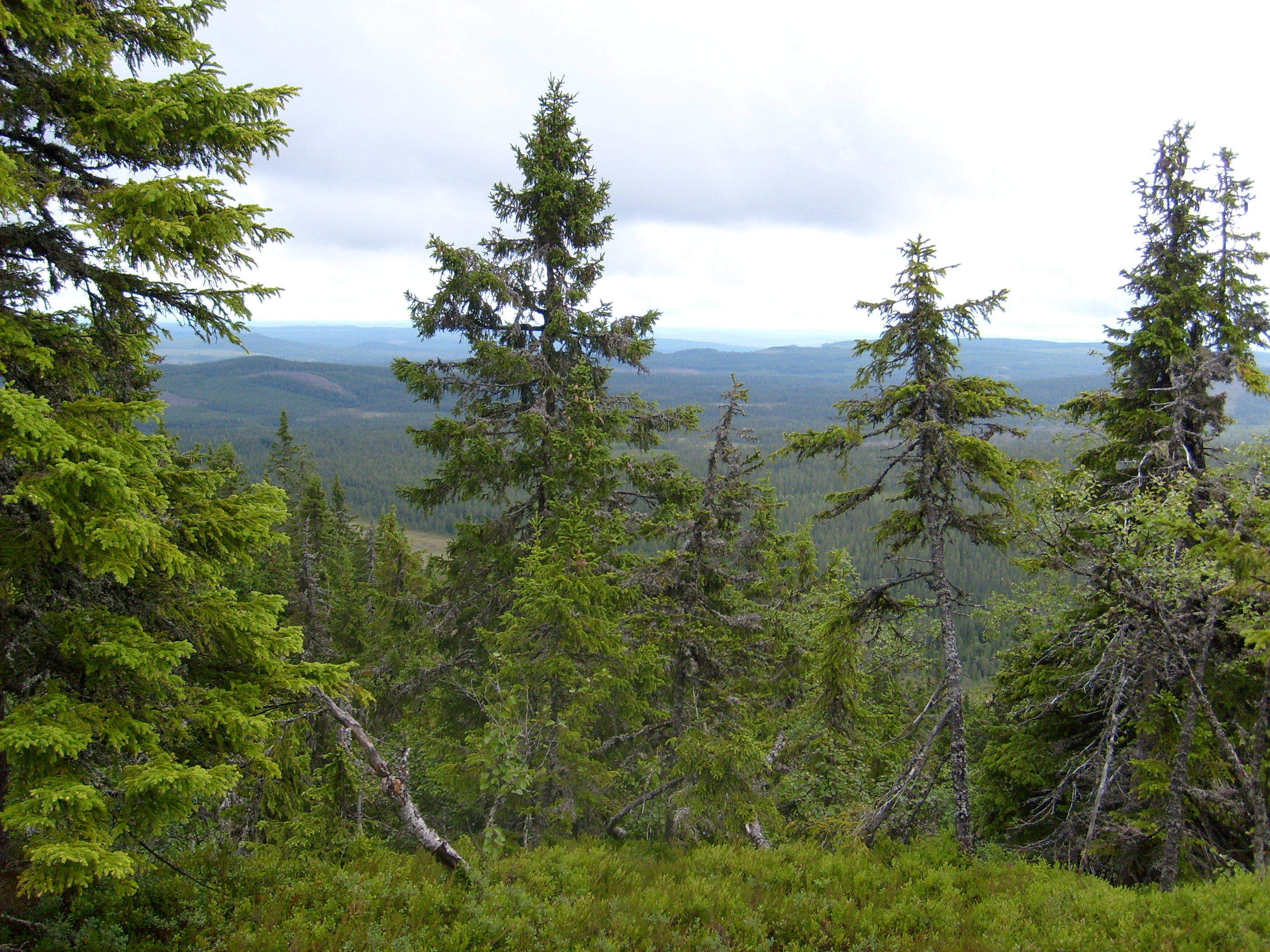
- Korpimäcki Reserve in July 2008

- Flag Coat of arms

- Dalarna County in Sweden

- Location map of Dalarna County in Sweden
- Coordinates: 60°40′43″N 15°36′02″E
- Country: Sweden
- Founded: 1634
- Capital: Falun
- Largest city: Borlänge
- Municipalities: 15: Älvdalen; Avesta; Borlänge; Falun; Gagnef; Hedemora; Leksand; Ludvika; Malung-Sälen; Mora; Orsa; Rättvik; Säter; Smedjebacken; Vansbro

Government
  - Governor: Helena Hoij
  - Regional Council: Region Dalarna

Area
  - Total: 28,188.8 km^{2} (10,883.8 sq mi)

Population (31 December 2023)
  - Total: 287,253
  - Density: 10.1903/km^{2} (26.3928/sq mi)

GDP
  - Total: SEK 99 billion €10.595 billion (2015)
- Time zone: UTC+1 (CET)
  - Summer (DST): UTC+2 (CEST)
- ISO 3166 code: SE-W
- NUTS Region: SE312
- Website: w.lst.se

Dalarna County (Swedish: Dalarnas län, pronounced [ˈdɑːlarnas lɛn]) is a landlocked county or län in central Sweden (Svealand). It borders on the counties of Uppsala, Jämtland, Gävleborg, Västmanland, Örebro and Värmland. It also borders on the Norwegian counties of Hedmark and Trøndelag to the west. It was formerly known as Kopparberg County (Swedish: Kopparbergs län, pronounced [ˈkɔpːarˌbærjs lɛn]) until the name was changed to that of the provincial region on 1 January 1997. The province of Dalarna is slightly larger than the county, as the westernmost part of Ljusdal Municipality belongs to it. Prince Gabriel, the son of Prince Carl Philip, is Duke of Dalarna.

The term Dalarna County is mainly used for administrative purposes; it is further divided into municipalities (kommuner). Dalarna County encompasses nearly all of the cultural and historical province of Dalarna (literally, "the valleys"). For the most part sparsely populated and with extensive tracts of wilderness, Dalarna County is almost as large as Belgium in terms of land area.

== History ==
In older times, Dalarna was periodically part of the territory ruled by the governor of Västerås Castle. The 1634 Instrument of Government led to the creation of a county covering Dalarna with its own County Governor. The Kopparbergs län (literally Copper Mountain County) was finally created by royal decree in 1647. On 1 January 1997, the name of the county was changed to Dalarna County. The small town of Kopparberg is not to be confused with the old county name, since it is located in Örebro County just to the south.

== Administration ==
The main aim of the County Administrative Board is to fulfil the goals set in national politics by the Riksdag and the Government, to coordinate the interests and promote the development of the county, to establish regional goals and safeguard the due process of law in the handling of each case. The County Administrative Board is a Government Agency headed by a Governor.

== Politics ==
The county council of Dalarna or Region Dalarna primarily handles health care and public transportation.

After the Swedish county council election in September 2018, the following political parties were represented in the Dalarna county council:

| Party | Seats | Votes | % |
|---|---|---|---|
| Social Democrats | 24 | 53,466 | 28.61% |
| Moderate Party | 16 | 35,291 | 18.89% |
| Sweden Democrats | 10 | 22,586 | 12.09% |
| Centre Party | 9 | 21,243 | 11.37% |
| Left Party | 6 | 14,248 | 7.62% |
| Dalarna Health Care Party | 6 | 13,170 | 7.05% |
| Christian Democrats | 6 | 13,169 | 7.05% |
| Liberals | 3 | 6,816 | 3.65% |
| Green Party | 3 | 5,780 | 3.09% |
| Others | - | 1,102 | 0.59% |
| Total | 83 | 186,871 | 100% |
| Turnout | | 191,068 | 84.95% |

== Riksdag elections ==
The table details all Riksdag election results of the Kopparberg and Dalarna counties since the unicameral era began in 1970. The blocs denote which party would support the Prime Minister or the lead opposition party towards the end of the elected parliament.

| Year | Turnout | Votes | V | S | MP | C | L | KD | M | SD | NyD | Left | Right |
|---|---|---|---|---|---|---|---|---|---|---|---|---|---|
| 1970 | 87.2 | 173,240 | 4.9 | 49.0 | | 26.7 | 10.8 | 1.8 | 6.6 | | | 53.8 | 44.1 |
| 1973 | 89.8 | 178,106 | 4.9 | 47.0 | | 31.5 | 6.5 | 1.8 | 7.9 | | | 51.9 | 45.9 |
| 1976 | 90.9 | 189,286 | 4.2 | 46.3 | | 30.2 | 8.1 | 1.4 | 9.3 | | | 50.6 | 47.7 |
| 1979 | 89.7 | 189,904 | 5.1 | 47.6 | | 24.0 | 7.4 | 1.5 | 13.7 | | | 52.8 | 45.1 |
| 1982 | 90.7 | 194,260 | 4.9 | 50.1 | 1.9 | 19.9 | 4.4 | 1.7 | 17.0 | | | 55.0 | 41.2 |
| 1985 | 88.7 | 191,359 | 5.2 | 48.5 | 1.9 | 16.3 | 11.8 | | 16.0 | | | 53.7 | 44.1 |
| 1988 | 84.0 | 180,125 | 6.0 | 47.0 | 5.7 | 15.0 | 10.5 | 3.1 | 12.4 | | | 58.7 | 37.8 |
| 1991 | 84.8 | 183,087 | 7.2 | 41.8 | 3.3 | 11.6 | 7.4 | 6.8 | 16.0 | | 7.2 | 46.5 | 41.8 |
| 1994 | 85.2 | 184,056 | 7.0 | 49.5 | 6.0 | 10.1 | 5.8 | 3.7 | 16.2 | | 1.0 | 62.4 | 35.8 |
| 1998 | 80.3 | 169,773 | 14.8 | 39.3 | 5.1 | 6.4 | 3.4 | 11.4 | 16.9 | | | 59.2 | 38.1 |
| 2002 | 77.7 | 163,012 | 9.5 | 43.8 | 4.7 | 9.9 | 9.7 | 7.7 | 11.6 | 1.1 | | 57.9 | 38.9 |
| 2006 | 80.5 | 169,110 | 6.7 | 40.3 | 4.4 | 10.8 | 5.1 | 5.4 | 21.1 | 2.8 | | 51.3 | 42.4 |
| 2010 | 83.8 | 179,168 | 5.9 | 37.5 | 6.0 | 7.9 | 4.9 | 4.4 | 25.1 | 7.0 | | 49.3 | 42.3 |
| 2014 | 86.2 | 184,911 | 5.8 | 35.4 | 5.1 | 7.8 | 3.4 | 3.5 | 19.0 | 16.8 | | 46.3 | 33.7 |
| 2018 | 87.6 | 188,027 | 7.3 | 30.7 | 3.3 | 10.0 | 3.6 | 6.1 | 16.7 | 20.8 | | 51.3 | 47.2 |
| 2022 | 85.4 | 188,980 | 5.3 | 31.7 | 3.8 | 6.5 | 3.1 | 6.0 | 16.4 | 25.7 | | 47.3 | 51.2 |

== Municipalities ==
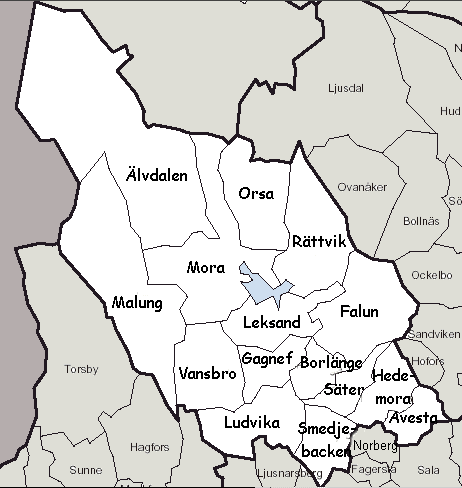
Municipalities of Dalarna County.

In Dalarna Province:

- Avesta
- Borlänge
- Falun
- Gagnef
- Hedemora
- Leksand
- Ludvika
- Malung-Sälen
- Mora
- Orsa
- Rättvik
- Säter
- Smedjebacken
- Vansbro
- Älvdalen

== Locations by population ==
| Pos | Locality | Population |
|---|---|---|
| 1 | Borlänge | 41,734 |
| 2 | Falun | 37,291 |
| 3 | Avesta | 14,506 |
| 4 | Ludvika | 14,498 |
| 5 | Mora | 10,896 |
| 6 | Hedemora | 7,273 |
| 7 | Leksand | 5,934 |
| 8 | Orsa | 5,308 |
| 9 | Malung | 5,126 |
| 10 | Smedjebacken | 5,100 |
| 11 | Rättvik | 4,686 |
| 12 | Säter | 4,429 |
| 13 | Grängesberg | 3,481 |
| 14 | Insjön | 2,149 |
| 15 | Vansbro | 2,026 |
| 16 | Mockfjärd | 1,937 |
| 17 | Bjursås | 1,839 |
| 18 | Grycksbo | 1,825 |
| 19 | Älvdalen | 1,810 |
| 20 | Långshyttan | 1,671 |
| 21 | Dala-Järna | 1,413 |
| 22 | Djurås | 1,278 |
| 23 | Siljansnäs | 1,268 |
| 24 | Svärdsjö | 1,251 |
| 25 | Vikarbyn | 1,171 |
| 26 | Horndal | 1,114 |
| 27 | Ornäs | 1,068 |
| 28 | Gagnef | 1,049 |

=== Foreign background ===
SCB have collected statistics on backgrounds of residents since 2002. These tables consist of all who have two foreign-born parents or are born abroad themselves. The chart lists election years and the last year on record alone.

| Location | 2002 | 2006 | 2010 | 2014 | 2018 | 2019 |
|---|---|---|---|---|---|---|
| Avesta | 10.8 | 11.7 | 12.7 | 16.7 | 22.5 | 22.9 |
| Borlänge | 11.4 | 13.5 | 17.2 | 20.4 | 24.2 | 24.9 |
| Falun | 7.6 | 8.5 | 9.8 | 11.0 | 13.3 | 13.6 |
| Gagnef | 7.6 | 7.9 | 8.3 | 8.7 | 10.0 | 10.1 |
| Hedemora | 9.3 | 10.3 | 11.1 | 13.8 | 17.9 | 18.2 |
| Leksand | 5.1 | 5.6 | 6.7 | 8.3 | 10.9 | 11.0 |
| Ludvika | 10.4 | 11.0 | 14.0 | 17.1 | 22.9 | 23.3 |
| Malung-Sälen | 5.8 | 7.4 | 9.0 | 10.1 | 12.9 | 13.5 |
| Mora | 4.4 | 5.3 | 6.5 | 7.6 | 9.7 | 10.1 |
| Orsa | 4.7 | 6.4 | 8.4 | 10.3 | 14.3 | 14.6 |
| Rättvik | 4.0 | 4.8 | 5.4 | 6.1 | 7.9 | 8.0 |
| Smedjebacken | 9.9 | 10.5 | 12.0 | 13.3 | 15.0 | 14.8 |
| Säter | 5.2 | 5.6 | 6.4 | 7.5 | 8.7 | 9.2 |
| Vansbro | 4.2 | 4.8 | 5.5 | 6.8 | 9.8 | 9.8 |
| Älvdalen | 3.3 | 4.1 | 5.8 | 7.1 | 9.6 | 9.8 |
| Total | 8.0 | 9.0 | 10.9 | 12.9 | 16.2 | 16.6 |
Source: SCB

== Heraldry ==
The Dalarna County inherited its coat of arms from the province of Dalarna. When it is shown with a royal crown it represents the County Administrative Board.

== See also ==
- Duke of Dalarna, a title for members of the royal family (see Duchies in Sweden)
- Dalecarlian horse
- Ecomuseum Bergslagen
- Scandinavian Mountains Airport
- Tandövala
- University College of Dalarna
