= 2002 Oxelösund municipal election =

Local election in Sweden

Oxelösund Municipality held a municipal election on 15 September 2002 as part of the local elections. This was held on the same day as the general election.

== Results ==
The number of seats remained at 31 with the Social Democrats winning the most at 15, a drop of five from 1998, losing their overall majority. There were 6,866 valid ballots cast. The Social Democrats remained in power since there was still a sizeable red-green majority (22-9).

Party	Votes	%	Seats	±
Social Democrats	3,204	46.6	15	-5
Left Party	1,071	15.6	5	+1
Moderates	896	13.0	4	0
People's Party	711	10.4	3	+1
Green Party	496	7.2	2	+2
Christian Democrats	317	4.6	2	+2
Centre Party	137	2.0	0	-1
Others	34	0.5	0	0
Invalid/blank votes	112			
Total	6978	100	31	0
Source: val.se

=== Electoral wards ===
All electoral wards were located within the Oxelösund urban area in a single constituency. For a detailed map of the electoral wards, see the 2010 official results held within the same boundaries.

Location	Turnout	Share	Votes	S	V	M	FP	MP	KD	C	Other
Dalgången	85.9	16.4	1,128	39.2	14.9	19.3	10.7	8.5	4.5	2.7	0.2
Danvik	84.8	12.5	858	34.3	14.5	19.6	15.5	7.7	4.9	2.7	0.9
Frösäng	75.0	12.6	866	54.8	17.2	8.4	6.0	5.5	5.8	1.4	0.8
Norra innerstaden	63.4	12.5	860	58.3	21.5	5.5	4.4	4.3	3.7	1.6	0.7
Peterslund	85.2	15.1	1,040	47.1	12.9	12.0	13.5	8.1	4.8	1.4	0.2
Sunda	85.0	16.4	1,128	41.0	12.9	14.4	14.9	9.4	4.9	2.3	0.2
Södra innerstaden	70.8	13.9	953	55.3	16.9	10.1	5.8	5.8	3.8	1.7	0.7
Postal vote		0.5	33								
Total	78.3	100.0	6,866	46.7	15.6	13.0	10.4	7.2	4.6	2.0	0.5
Source: val.se
