= 2018 Oxelösund municipal election =

Swedish local election

Oxelösund Municipality held a municipal election on 9 September 2018 as part of the local elections. This was held on the same day as the general election.

== Results ==
The number of seats remained at 31 with the Social Democrats winning the most at 12, a drop of one from 2014.

Party	Votes	%	Seats	±
Social Democrats	3,041	39.0	12	-1
Moderates	2,037	26.1	8	+1
Left Party	902	11.6	4	0
Sweden Democrats	792	10.2	3	0
Green Party	263	3.4	1	-1
Liberals	257	3.3	1	0
Centre Party	247	3.2	1	0
Christian Democrats	217	2.8	1	+1
Others	35	0.4	0	0
Invalid/blank votes	117			
Total	7,908	100	31	0
Source: val.se

=== Constituencies ===
All constituencies were located in the Oxelösund urban area.

Location	Turnout	Share	Votes	S	M	V	SD	MP	L	C	KD	Other
Dalgången	85.8	17.1	1,329	35.1	34.5	8.7	7.4	4.1	3.1	4.4	2.7	0.2
Danvik	89.9	12.6	979	31.5	36.3	7.8	7.8	3.4	5.2	4.6	2.8	0.8
Frösäng	78.0	11.5	897	44.4	18.8	13.6	11.9	2.5	1.8	2.1	4.2	0.7
Norra innerstaden	67.4	12.5	977	42.0	15.9	15.8	16.9	1.8	1.9	1.9	3.5	0.3
Peterslund	91.4	13.9	1,082	38.0	27.3	12.7	8.7	4.7	4.2	2.8	1.7	0.1
Sunda	85.7	14.6	1,134	39.5	29.1	10.6	7.5	3.4	3.7	2.7	3.0	0.4
Södra innerstaden	72.9	14.4	1,121	43.6	18.2	13.5	12.8	3.2	2.8	2.9	2.4	0.5
Postal vote		3.5	272									
Total	84.0	100.0	7,791	39.0	26.1	11.6	10.2	3.4	3.3	3.2	2.8	0.4
Source: val.se
