= 2006 Oxelösund municipal election =

Local election in Sweden

Oxelösund Municipality, in southeast Sweden, held a municipal election on 17 September 2006 as part of the local elections. This was held on the same day as the general election.

== Results ==
The number of seats remained at 31 with the Social Democrats winning the most at 14, a drop of one from 2002. There were 6,883 valid ballots cast.

Party	Votes	%	Seats	±
Social Democrats	3,007	43.7	14	-1
Moderates	2,149	23.4	7	+3
Left Party	767	11.1	4	-1
People's Party	498	7.2	2	-1
Green Party	430	6.2	2	0
Centre Party	211	3.1	1	+1
Christian Democrats	185	2.7	1	-1
Sweden Democrats	98	1.4	0	0
Others	77	1.1	0	0
Invalid/blank votes	248			
Total	7,131	100	31	0
Source: val.se

=== Electoral wards ===
All electoral wards were located within the Oxelösund urban area in a single constituency.

Location	Turnout	Share	Votes	S	M	V	FP	MP	C	KD	SD	Other
Dalgången	85.9	17.0	1,171	35.4	32.8	10.0	7.8	6.5	2.4	2.9	1.1	1.1
Danvik	85.8	12.8	878	32.6	31.5	9.6	10.0	5.6	4.4	3.9	1.1	1.3
Frösäng	74.9	12.5	862	53.7	15.9	12.1	3.8	5.9	2.3	3.9	1.2	1.2
Norra innerstaden	62.4	11.9	817	56.3	13.1	12.9	4.4	4.9	2.4	1.6	3.2	1.2
Peterslund	85.2	15.2	1,044	43.0	21.2	12.2	9.7	5.7	2.8	2.6	1.8	1.1
Sunda	85.5	16.0	1,098	38.3	26.0	9.5	9.8	8.4	4.6	2.0	0.5	0.9
Södra innerstaden	68.8	13.6	939	51.7	19.0	12.8	4.0	5.9	2.2	2.0	1.3	1.2
Postal vote		1.0	74									
Total	78.9	100.0	6,883	43.7	23.4	11.1	7.2	6.2	3.1	2.7	1.4	1.1
Source: val.se
