= Norr Amsberg =

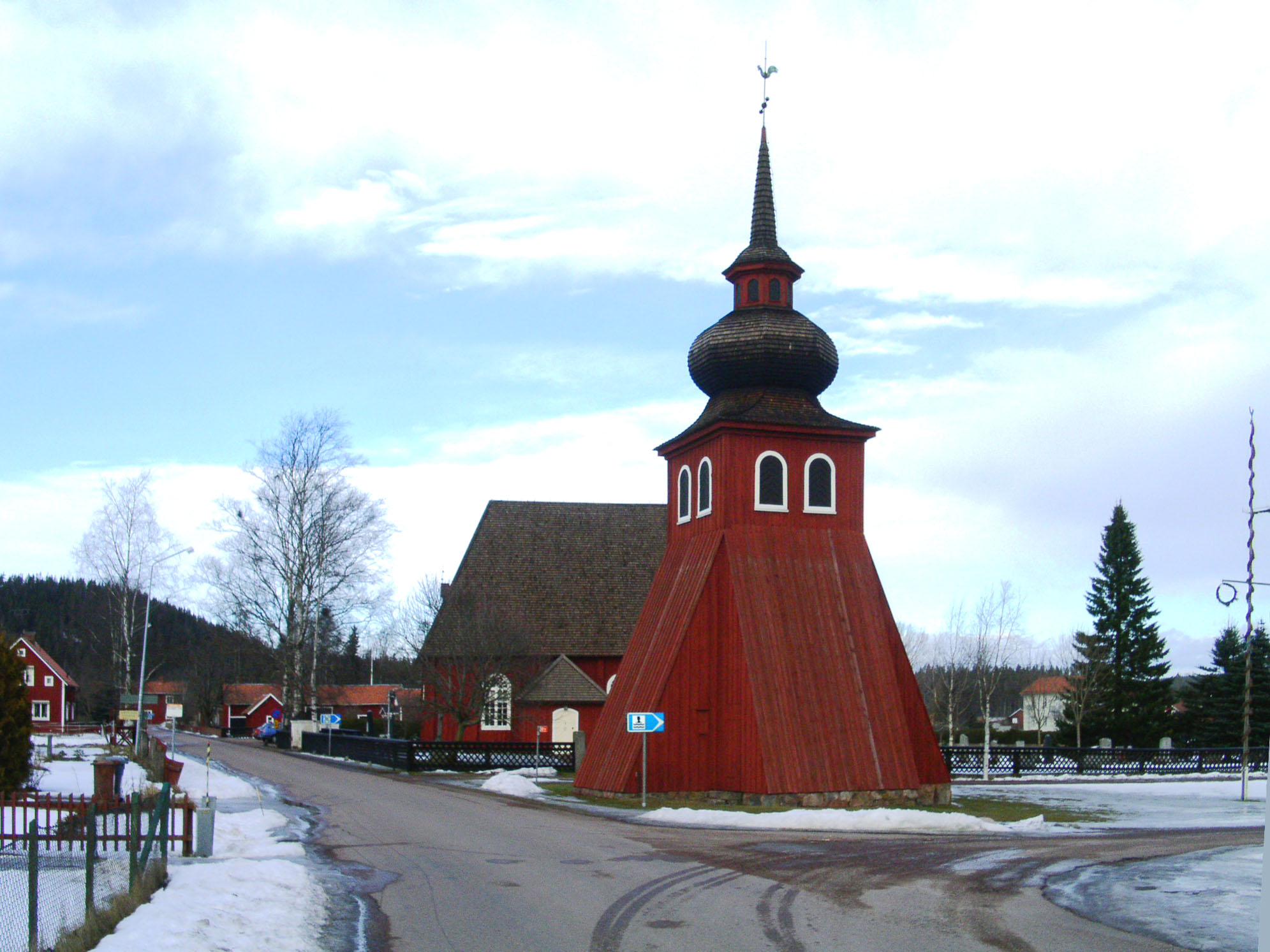
- Norr Amsberg chapel

- Location within Dalarna Location within Sweden
- Coordinates: 60°32′N 15°21′E
- Country: Sweden
- Province: Dalarna
- County: Dalarna County
- Municipality: Borlänge Municipality

Area
  - Total: 0.83 km^{2} (0.32 sq mi)

Population (31 December 2010)
  - Total: 236
  - Density: 286/km^{2} (740/sq mi)
- Time zone: UTC+1 (CET)
  - Summer (DST): UTC+2 (CEST)

Norr Amsberg is a locality situated in Borlänge Municipality, Dalarna County, Sweden with 236 inhabitants in 2010. It lies around seven kilometres northwest of Borlänge.
