= Peace & Love (festival) =

Music festival in Sweden (1999–2019)

- Genre: Rock, pop, hip hop, world, Swedish
- Dates: 3 days, in June/July (6 days including theme days)
- Locations: Borlänge, Sweden
- Years active: 1999–2019
- Founders: Föreningen Peace & Love, Jesper Heed, Henry Murtokangas, Michael Kvist
- Website: www.peaceandlove.se

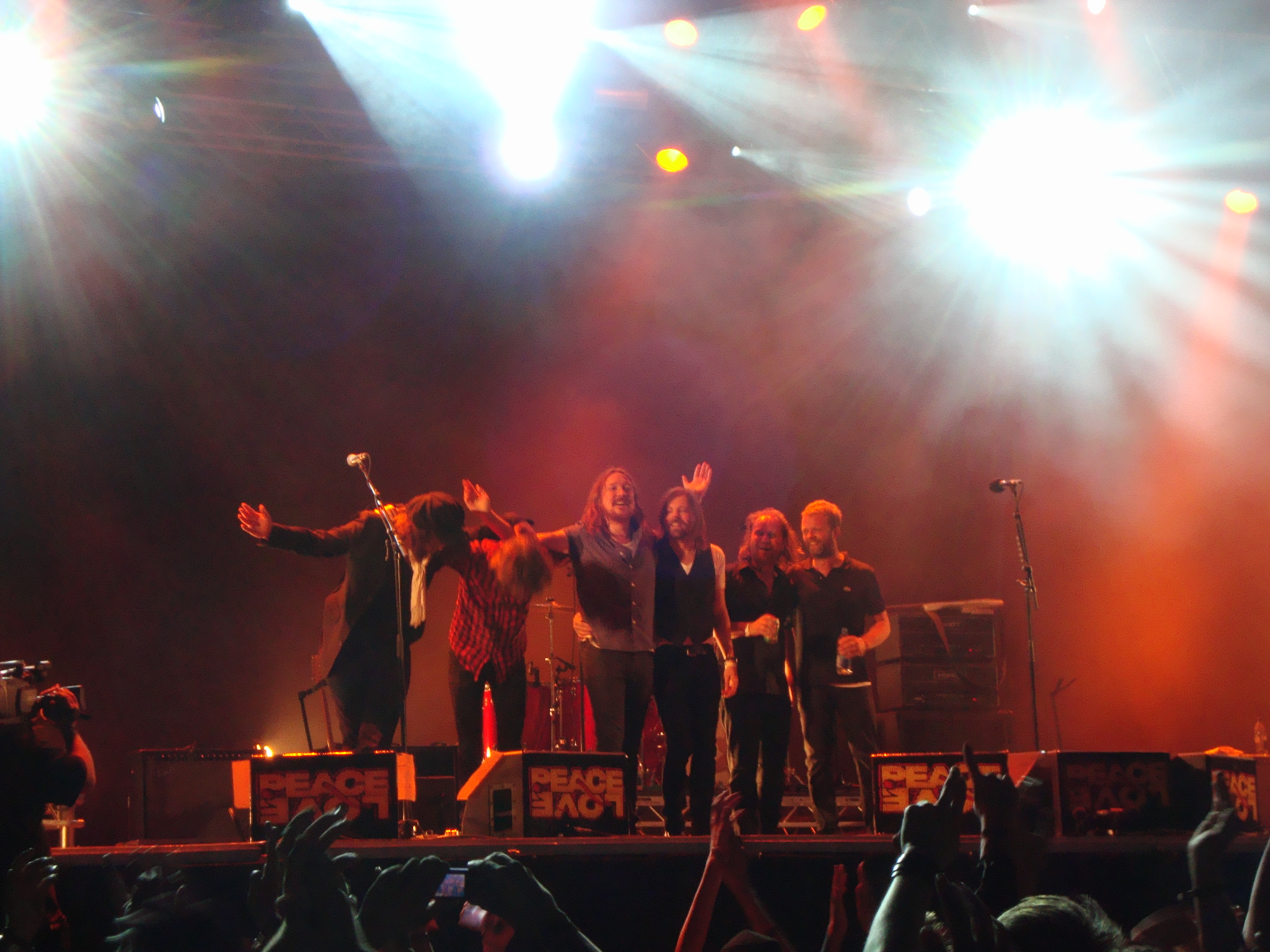
Swedish artist Lars Winnerbäck along with accompanying musicians, Peace and Love festival, Borlänge, Sweden

Peace & Love was the largest music festival in Sweden, known for its humanitarian message, pervasive throughout the event. It started in Borlänge and ran from 1999 until the company filed for bankruptcy in 2013.

The Peace & Love Crew announced that they would continue to do the much loved festival and in 2014 the festival was back on under the name "Peace & Love World Forum". Since then it has expanded and gone back to its old name "Peace & Love". The festival was cancelled in 2020 due to the ongoing Covid-19 pandemic, and shortly the festival declared bankruptcy.

== History ==
The Peace & Love Festival was first held in 1999, as a reaction to the ongoing violence. The first festival was held at a club in central Borlänge, with about 900 attendees. Since then the festival was held at different locations in central Borlänge. The Peace & Love Festival was one of Scandinavia's fastest-growing festivals. In 2006 there were 15,000 visitors per day, with over 37,000 people attending in total. The 10th Peace & Love Festival was in 2008 and had a record of 25000 visitors, which made it the second biggest festival in Sweden.

=== 2008 ===
The tickets sold out as early as 23 May, and the festival got a lot of attention in nationwide media. 2008 was celebrated as the tenth festival. Artist that played, amongst others, were Sex Pistols [UK], Manu Chao [FR/ES], Kent, Teddybears, The Wombats [UK], Crystal Castles [CAN]. As a late surprise Roky Ericson and The Nomads was announced.

=== 2009 ===
The festival was held between 22 June and 27 June. This year Peace & Love became Sweden's biggest festival with 41 685 tickets sold. Some of the bands and artists were: Mötley Crüe (US), The Kooks (UK), Volbeat (DK), Milow (BE), Keane (UK), Thåström and Håkan Hellström.

=== 2010 ===
In 2010, the event took place between 28 June and 3 July - the same weekend as other major Scandinavian festivals Roskilde Festival and Hove Festival. The festival sold 42 000 tickets. This year, amongst others, Jay-Z, Lily Allen, Patti Smith, The Kooks and Kent played.

1999	2000	2001	2002	2003	2004
Dates: 5–6 August	Dates: 4–5 August	Dates: 3–4 August	Dates: 5–6 July	Dates: 4–5 July	Dates: 8–10 July
Number of days: 2	Number of days: 2	Number of days: 2	Number of days: 2	Number of days: 2	Number of days: 3
Visitors: 900	Visitors: 2 500	Visitors: 3 000	Visitors: 3 500	Visitors: 8 500	Visitors: 10 000
Artists: Ark; Ken; The Nomads	Artists: Thåström; Lars Winnerbäck; Skurkarna	Artists: Sator; Backyard Babies; Rikard Wolff	Artists: The Latin Kings; Sophie Zelmani; Infinite Mass	Artists: The Ark; The Sounds; Jakob Hellman	Artists: Motörhead [UK] Hanoi Rocks [FI] Broder Daniel
2005	2006	2007	2008	2009	2010
Dates: 8–9 July	Dates: 4–8 July	Dates: 26–30 June	Dates: 23–28 June	Dates: 22–27 June	Dates: 28 June – 3 July
Number of days: 2	Number of days: 5	Number of days: 5	Number of days: 6	Number of days: 6	Number of days: 6
Visitors: 10 000	Visitors: 15 000	Visitors: 20 000	Visitors: 25 000	Visitors: 41 685	Visitors: 42 000
Artists: Ulf Lundell; Thomas Di Leva; Håkan Hellström	Artists: Patti Smith [US] New York Dolls [US] The Cardigans	Artists: Iggy & The Stooges [US] Alice Cooper [US] The Ark	Artists: Sex Pistols [UK] Manu Chao [FR/ES] Kent	Artists: Mötley Crüe [US] Håkan Hellström; Faith No More [US]	Artists: Jay-Z [US] Lily Allen [UK] Patti Smith [US]

== Theme ==
Each year, Peace & Love focuses on a subject that they theme the festival on.

Past years' themes

- 2004 - Freedom of Speech
- 2005 - Environment
- 2006 - Democracy
- 2007 - Revolution
- 2008 - Wake Up!
- 2009 - Passion
- 2010 - Freedom
- 2011 - Courage, hope and love
- 2012 - A new World
- 2013 - Time For Peace - Cancelled
- 2014 - Diversity
- 2015 - Rise Of The Citizen

== Artists ==
Over the years, artists such as Patti Smith, New York Dolls, Vitalic, Jay-Z, Tech N9ne, Lily Allen, Them Crooked Vultures, Alice Cooper, Slayer, W.A.S.P., Surkin, NOFX, Ed Harcourt, Vive la Fête, Hanoi Rocks, Motörhead, Cut Copy, and Khonnor, Familjen, Rootvälta, Den Svenska Björnstammen, Miike Snow, Name The Pet, The Cardigans, Thåström, Håkan Hellström, The Sounds, Mando Diao, Lars Winnerbäck, Ulf Lundell, The Hives, Looptroop, The Hellacopters and Silverbullit, among many others. The band which has played the most often at the Peace & Love festival is Sugarplum Fairy, a rock band from Borlänge whose two singers, Carl and Victor, are younger brothers of Gustaf Norén from the better-known band Mando Diao, also a rock band from Borlänge. Sugarplum Fairy has played every year since 2001.

Some of the bands that have played:

- 1999 – Ken, The Ark, The Motorhomes
- 2000 – Joakim Thåström, Lars Winnerbäck, Mando Diao, Michael Monroe, The (International) Noise Conspiracy
- 2001 – Backyard Babies, Rikard Wolff, Sator, Rootvälta
- 2002 – The Latin Kings, Sophie Zelmani, Infinite Mass, The Sounds, Sugarplum Fairy
- 2003 – Jakob Hellman, The Ark, The Sounds, Pain, Moneybrother, Steve Wynn, Rootvälta
- 2004 – Motörhead, Hanoi Rocks, Broder Daniel, Marit Bergman, Lisa Miskovsky, Eldkvarn, Timbuktu
- 2005 – Cut Copy, Ulf Lundell, Thomas Di Leva, The Hellacopters, Håkan Hellström, Nationalteatern, Khonnor
- 2006 – Patti Smith, New York Dolls, The Cardigans, Ed Harcourt, Dia Psalma, Thåström, Håkan Hellström
- 2007 – Iggy & The Stooges, Alice Cooper, Damien Rice, Jason Mraz, Backyard Babies, The Ark, Sahara Hotnights, Meshuggah, Dia Psalma, Mando Diao, Snook, Crashdïet, The Horrors, Lars Winnerbäck (secret act).
- 2008 - Sex Pistols, Manu Chao, Thåström, Kent, Håkan Hellström, The Hives, In Flames, W.A.S.P, Jason Mraz, Suzanne Vega, The Hellacopters, Millencolin, Adam Tensta, Pugh Rogefeldt, De Lyckliga Kompisarna, Roky Erickson (secret act).
- 2009 - Turbonegro, Keane, Slagsmålsklubben, Lars Winnerbäck, Volbeat, Faith No More, Satyricon, Thåström, The Stranglers, Håkan Hellström, Pete Doherty, Mötley Crüe, Mando Diao, Carl Barât, Babyshambles, Chris Cornell, Monster Magnet, Razorlight, Psilodump.
- 2010 - Jay-Z, Them Crooked Vultures, Patti Smith, Lily Allen, The Kooks, Alice in Chains, John Fogerty, Mew, Vitalic, Familjen, Tech N9ne, Miike Snow, Surkin, Sick of it All, Hardcore Superstar, Brother Ali, Amanda Jenssen, Taylor Mali, Kent, The Hives
- 2011 - Bob Dylan, Bob Geldof, Jesse Jackson, Kings of Leon, Thirty Seconds to Mars, Ziggy Marley, M.I.A, The Strokes, Deadmau5
- 2012 - Rihanna, Skrillex, Regina Spektor, Mumford & Sons, Edguy, Dropkick Murphys, John Hiatt, Roxette, Kent, Billy Idol, The Shins, Christina Perri, Simple Plan
- 2013 - (Cancelled) Depeche Mode, Queens Of The Stone Age, Håkan Hellström, Iggy & The Stooges, Johnossi, First Aid Kit, Macklemore, Graveyard
- 2014 - Miss Li, Johnossi, Melissa Horn, Stefan Sundström, INVSN, Ebbot Lundberg
- 2015 - Veronica Maggio, D-A-D, Jill Johnson, Ola Salo, Doug Seeger, Petter, Timbuktu, 99Plajo, Judah & The Lion

== Peace & Love City bandy club ==
In 2016, the festival started a cooperation with the leading local bandy club, which led the bandy club to change its names from Borlänge Bandy to Peace & Love City.
