= 1998 Oxelösund municipal election =

Swedish local election

Oxelösund Municipality held a municipal election on 20 September 1998 as part of the local elections. This was held on the same day as the general election.

== Results ==
The number of seats remained at 31 with the Social Democrats winning the most at 20, a gain of one from 1994, retaining their overall majority. There were 6,984 valid ballots cast.

Party	Votes	%	Seats	±
Social Democrats	4,362	62.5	20	+1
Left Party	903	12.9	4	+1
Moderates	901	12.9	4	0
People's Party	387	5.5	2	0
Centre Party	192	2.7	1	0
Christian Democrats	116	1.7	0	0
Green Party	87	1.2	0	-2
Others	36	0.5	0	0
Invalid/blank votes	122			
Total	7,106	100	31	0
Source: SCB

=== Electoral wards ===
All electoral wards were located within the Oxelösund urban area in a single constituency. For a detailed map of the electoral wards, see the 2010 official results held within the same boundaries.

Location	#	Turnout	Share	Votes	S	V	M	FP	C	KD	MP	Other
Dalgången	3	84.3	15.0	1,048	58.1	11.6	18.9	5.9	2.7	1.5	1.0	0.3
Danvik	7	82.6	12.1	846	53.1	11.7	18.8	8.9	3.5	2.2	1.7	0.1
Frösäng	4	75.9	12.0	841	68.4	15.8	7.5	2.7	3.0	1.7	0.5	0.5
Norra innerstaden	1	67.1	13.0	908	71.6	16.4	5.0	1.5	1.9	1.1	1.4	1.1
Peterslund	6	87.9	15.8	1,103	64.8	11.4	10.5	8.2	2.0	1.6	1.1	0.4
Sunda	5	89.6	17.0	1,184	58.0	9.5	18.6	7.3	3.4	1.6	1.2	0.5
Södra innerstaden	2	70.3	14.7	1,027	64.8	15.5	9.3	3.3	2.8	1.9	1.8	0.8
Postal vote			0.4	27								
Total		79.7	100.0	6,984	62.5	12.9	12.9	5.5	2.7	1.7	1.2	0.5
Source: val.se
