= 2014 Oxelösund municipal election =

Swedish local election

Oxelösund Municipality held a municipal election on 14 September 2014 as part of the local elections. This was held on the same day as the general election.

== Results ==
The number of seats remained at 31 with the Social Democrats winning the most at 13, a gain of one from 2010. There were 7,624 valid ballots cast.

Party	Votes	%	Seats	±
Social Democrats	3,132	41.1	13	+1
Moderates	1,786	23.4	7	-2
Left Party	966	12.7	4	0
Sweden Democrats	792	8.6	3	+2
Green Party	467	6.1	2	0
People's Party	302	4.0	1	-1
Centre Party	186	2.4	1	0
Christian Democrats	217	1.5	0	0
Others	15	0.2	0	0
Invalid/blank votes	127			
Total	7,751	100	31	0
Source: val.se

=== Electoral wards ===
All electoral wards were located in the Oxelösund urban area in a single constituency.

Location	Turnout	Share	Votes	S	M	V	SD	MP	FP	C	KD	Other
Dalgången	87.1	17.6	1,343	33.4	31.9	11.6	7.1	5.2	6.1	2.9	1.5	0.2
Danvik	88.3	12.6	958	31.5	35.9	9.0	5.8	5.7	5.1	4.5	2.3	0.1
Frösäng	76.8	11.4	870	52.0	12.4	17.0	9.0	4.5	2.2	0.7	2.1	0.2
Norra innerstaden	69.5	12.6	958	45.8	11.2	17.5	14.8	4.7	2.2	2.2	1.4	0.2
Peterslund	88.1	14.1	1,078	42.8	25.0	11.5	6.0	8.3	3.6	1.1	1.4	0.2
Sunda	84.5	14.9	1,138	41.8	26.7	9.8	6.1	7.2	4.4	2.9	0.9	0.2
Södra innerstaden	71.4	13.7	1,045	43.9	16.7	14.3	12.1	5.6	3.2	2.3	1.7	0.2
Postal vote		3.1	234									
Total	83.1	100.0	7,624	41.1	23.4	12.7	8.6	6.1	4.0	2.4	1.5	0.2
Source: val.se
