= Halvarsgårdarna =

- Location within Dalarna Location within Sweden
- Coordinates: 60°24′22″N 15°23′14″E
- Country: Sweden
- Province: Dalarna
- County: Dalarna County
- Municipality: Borlänge Municipality

Area
  - Total: 0.58 km^{2} (0.22 sq mi)

Population (31 December 2010)
  - Total: 325
  - Density: 564/km^{2} (1,460/sq mi)
- Time zone: UTC+1 (CET)
  - Summer (DST): UTC+2 (CEST)

Halvarsgårdarna is a locality situated in Borlänge Municipality, Dalarna County, Sweden with 325 inhabitants in 2010.
