= Kristian Gidlund =

Swedish musician and blogger (1983–2013)

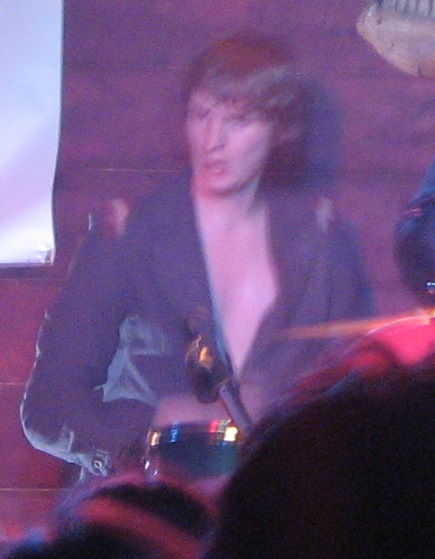
- Kristian Gidlund performing with Sugarplum Fairy in April 2007
- Born: Kristian Olof Erik Gidlund; 21 September 1983; Borlänge, Sweden
- Died: 17 September 2013 (aged 29); Sweden
- Occupations: Musician, author, journalist

Kristian Olof Erik Gidlund (21 September 1983 – 17 September 2013) was a Swedish musician and author. He played drums in the rock band Sugarplum Fairy. He hosted Sommar i P1 on Swedish radio and released one book. In 2011, Gidlund was diagnosed with stomach cancer, and died from the disease in 2013 four days short of his 30th birthday.

== Biography ==
Gidlund was born and raised in Borlänge and started the rock band Sugarplum Fairy along with two friends, brothers Victor Norén and Carl Norén, in the late 1990s. The band had its big breakthrough with the song "Sweet Jackie" in 2004, a hit which Gidlund wrote and composed. In 2009 the band took a break and Gidlund started to freelance as a journalist at the same time studying multimedia at Södertörns Högskola. During his studies he resided in Hägersten outside of Stockholm.

In 2011 Gidlund was diagnosed with stomach cancer. After that diagnosis he started a blog called "I kroppen min" (In this body of mine) which got eight million visitors. He went through several chemotherapy sessions but his cancer continued to advance. In 2013, his first book I kroppen min – resan mot livets slut och alltings början (en: Inside my body – the travel towards the end of life and start of everything) partly including large excerpts from his blog. Both the blog and the book received wide attention in the media, and he was also invited to talk about his illness and his views on death on several talk shows.

In June 2013 photographer Emma Svensson organized a photo exhibition about Gidlund. During the same month Gidlund was host of the radio show Sommar i P1. Gidlund's broadcast of Sommar i P1 was one of the five most listened to during the summer radio show's run.

== Death ==
In September 2013 Gidlund's condition worsened and on 17 September he died of cancer, a few days before his 30th birthday.

== Bibliography ==
- I kroppen min : resan mot livets slut och alltings början (2013)
- I kroppen min – Vägskäl (2013)
