= Idkerberget =

- Location within Dalarna Location within Sweden
- Coordinates: 60°23′N 15°14′E
- Country: Sweden
- Province: Dalarna
- County: Dalarna County
- Municipality: Borlänge Municipality

Area
  - Total: 1.21 km^{2} (0.47 sq mi)

Population (31 December 2010)
  - Total: 290
  - Density: 239/km^{2} (620/sq mi)
- Time zone: UTC+1 (CET)
  - Summer (DST): UTC+2 (CEST)

Idkerberget is a locality in Borlänge Municipality, Dalarna County, Sweden with 290 inhabitants in 2010.
