= Soltorgsgymnasiet =

Coordinates: 60.493°N 15.415°E

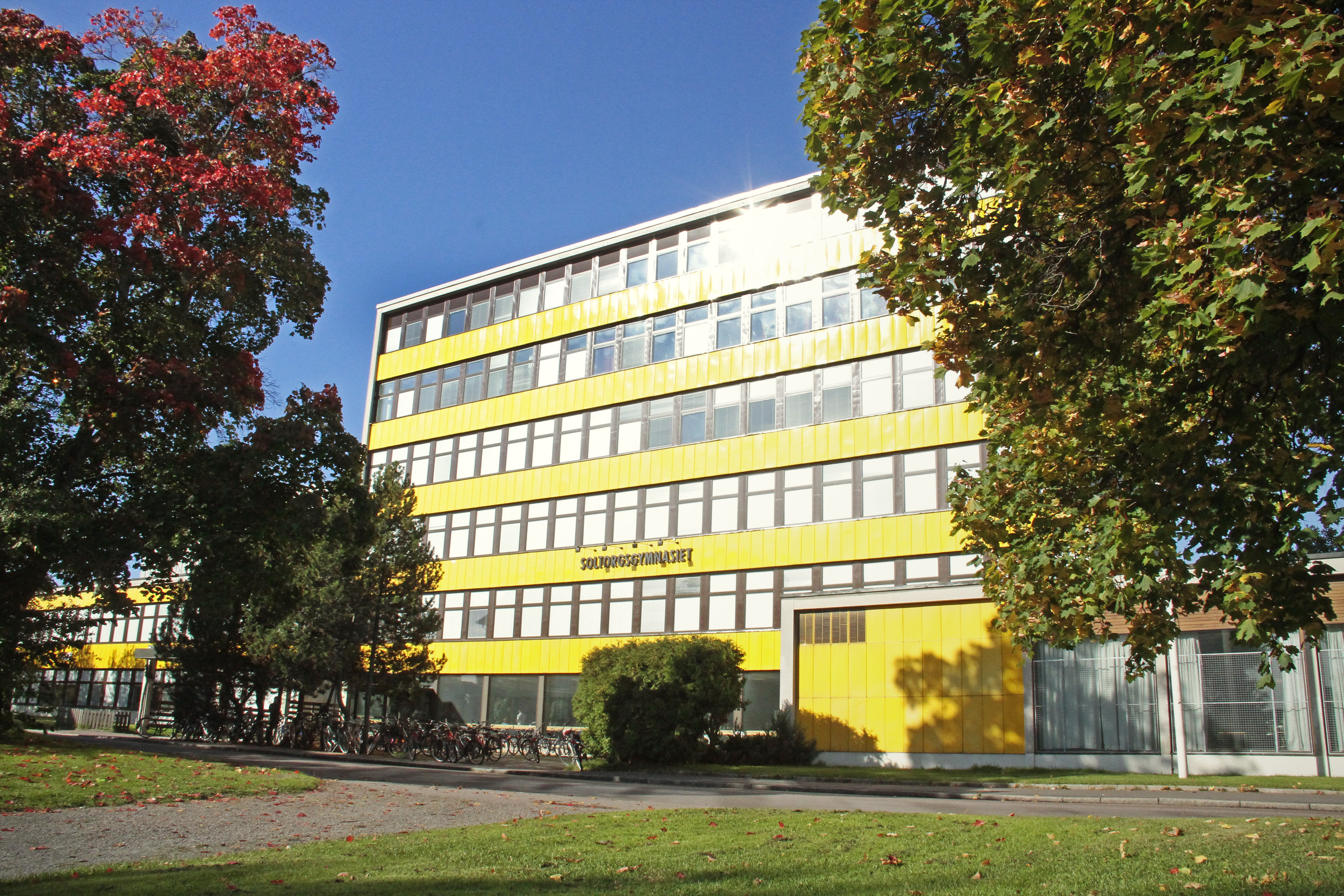
- Sweden, Dalarna, Borlänge

Information
- Type: Public Gymnasium
- Established: 1898
- Principal: Philip Landström
- Staff: 68
- Enrollment: ~500
- Website: Soltorgsgymnasiet

Soltorgsgymnasiet commonly referred to as Soltorg is a natural science and technology focused gymnasium in Borlänge. As of 2007 the school offers interdisciplinary focus of studies. Giving the students extensive freedom of choice of higher education.

Since 2002 Soltorgsgymnasiet have had an exchange-agreement with Lycée Léon Bourgeois in Épernay for teacher and the students reading French and an exchange with a school in Magdeburg for the students reading German. Exchange students are regularly sent and received for short periods of time.

== Programs ==
- Nature
- Technology
- Humanistic
