= Domnarvet =

Steelworks in Borlänge, Sweden

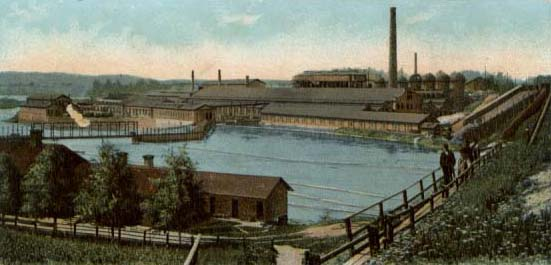
The ironworks around 1900

Domnarvets Jernverk (Domnarvets ironworks), was a steel producing company in Borlänge, Sweden. Since 1978, Domnarvet is a part of SSAB. The works were founded in 1872-78 and were originally a part of Stora Kopparbergs Bergslag.
