= 2010 Oxelösund municipal election =

Swedish local election

Oxelösund Municipality, Sweden held a municipal election on 19 September 2010 as part of the local elections. This was held on the same day as the general election.

== Results ==
The number of seats remained at 31 with the Social Democrats winning the most at 12, a drop of two from 2006. There were 7,490 valid ballots cast.

Party	Votes	%	Seats	±
Social Democrats	2,932	39.1	12	-2
Moderates	2,149	28.7	9	+2
Left Party	842	11.2	4	0
Green Party	554	7.4	2	0
People's Party	493	6.6	2	0
Sweden Democrats	178	2.4	1	+1
Centre Party	176	2.3	1	0
Christian Democrats	156	2.1	0	-1
Others	10	0.1	0	0
Invalid/blank votes	131			
Total	7,621	100	31	0
Source: val.se

=== Electoral wards ===
All electoral wards were located within the Oxelösund urban area in a single constituency.

Location	Turnout	Share	Votes	S	M	V	MP	FP	SD	C	KD	Other
Dalgången	88.2	17.4	1,307	32.6	36.3	10.4	6.8	8.7	1.1	2.4	1.6	0.1
Danvik	87.0	12.0	902	25.3	41.7	8.5	7.4	8.9	2.1	3.3	2.7	0.1
Frösäng	79.2	12.1	903	49.3	20.3	11.7	7.1	3.9	2.0	1.7	3.9	0.2
Norra innerstaden	69.8	12.4	929	50.4	16.5	14.0	7.2	3.4	5.3	2.0	1.0	0.2
Peterslund	88.2	14.4	1,078	37.7	30.4	11.5	6.5	8.8	1.9	1.3	1.9	0.0
Sunda	85.9	15.7	1,178	36.1	32.1	8.7	9.3	7.3	1.3	3.2	2.0	0.0
Södra innerstaden	73.0	14.2	1,061	46.4	21.1	14.4	6.2	4.1	3.1	2.3	2.0	0.4
Postal vote		1.8	132									
Total	82.9	100.0	7,490	39.1	28.7	11.2	7.4	6.6	2.4	2.3	2.1	0.1
Source: val.se
