= SSAB =

Swedish multinational steel company

SSAB AB
- Company type: Publicly traded Aktiebolag
- Traded as: Nasdaq Stockholm: SSAB A, SSAB B Nasdaq Helsinki: SSABAH, SSABBH
- ISIN: SE0000171100; SE0000120669
- Industry: Steel
- Founded: 1978; 48 years ago
- Headquarters: Stockholm, Sweden
- Key people: Lennart Evrell (Chairman); Johnny Sjöström (President and CEO)
- Revenue: ▼103.42 billion kr (2024)
- Operating income: ▼7.86 billion kr (2024)
- Net income: ▼6.53 billion kr (2024)
- Total assets: ▲110.73 billion kr (2024)
- Total equity: ▲71.02 billion kr (2024)
- Owner: LKAB (10.85%); Government of Finland (6.5%)
- Number of employees: ▲14,618 (2024)
- Website: www.ssab.com

SSAB AB (SSAB A, SSAB B), earlier Svenskt Stål AB (lit. 'Swedish Steel, Limited'), is a Swedish company, formed in 1978, that specialises in producing steel. The largest shareholders are the Swedish state-owned mining company LKAB, and the Government of Finland.

== History ==
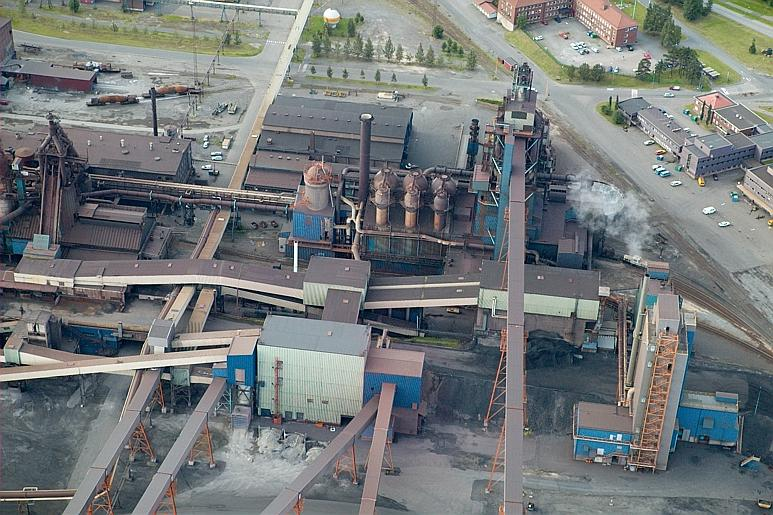
SSAB facilities in Luleå

Svenskt Stål AB was established on 1 January 1978, following a Swedish parliamentary decision to merge three struggling steel companies: Domnarvets Ironworks, Norrbottens Järnverk AB (NJA), and Oxelösunds Ironworks. The merger was proposed by a government-led investigation to consolidate Sweden's struggling steel industry.

At its founding, SSAB was 50% owned by the Swedish state and 25% each by Gränges and Stora Kopparberg. Björn Wahlström, managing director of NJA, led the merger negotiations and became SSAB's first managing director. The company initially employed approximately 18,000 workers across various operations.

=== Restructuring and profitability (1980s) ===
The initial years were financially challenging, with losses recorded between 1978 and 1981. The company restructured by closing unprofitable operations and focusing on specific products and locations. In 1982, SSAB reported its first profitable year. Ownership changes followed, with Stora selling its stake to the Swedish state in 1981, and Gränges being acquired by Electrolux. SSAB further focused on steel production and was listed on the Stockholm Stock Exchange in 1989.

In 1987, a new restructuring plan led to the concentration of production within certain areas. The company formed subsidiaries SSAB Tunnplåt AB (for thin sheet steel production) and SSAB Oxelösund AB. A third subsidiary, SSAB Profiler, was also established but later sold to Ovako Steel. The Domnarvet electrosteel plant was closed in 1989, moving focus to continuous casting from Luleå.

=== Expansion and modernisation (1990s) ===
Following its stock market listing, the Swedish state gradually reduced its own ownership in SSAB, fully divesting direct ownership by 1992. The same year, SSAB acquired Korrugals band-coating line in Finspång and introduced the "Sträng 5" continuous casting line in Luleå. In 1993, a CAS-OB facility was established in Luleå, and SSAB Laminated Steel AB in Ronneby was integrated into SSAB Tunnplåt. Significant investments included a new pre-rolling mill in Borlänge in 1999 and a new blast furnace (Masugn 3) in Luleå in 2000.

=== International expansion (2000s–2010s) ===
In 2008, SSAB acquired the American steel producer IPSCO, which operated mills in Montpelier, Iowa, and Mobile, Alabama. These facilities focused on scrap-based steel production using electric arc furnaces rather than blast furnaces.

In 2014, SSAB acquired Finnish steel producer Rautaruukki for €1.1 bn. The acquisition increased SSAB's steel production capacity by 2.6 million tons. Following the merger, Finnish state-owned Solidium became SSAB's third-largest shareholder after Industrivärden and LKAB. Key Rautaruukki production facilities that remained operational included the steel plant in Raahe and the sheet and pipe manufacturing facility in Hämeenlinna.

=== Sustainability initiatives (2020s) ===
In 2021, SSAB produced the world's first fossil-free steel using hydrogen instead of coke-based processes. The steel was delivered to Volvo Group for testing. Today, SSAB operates under three main divisions: SSAB Special Steels, SSAB Europe, and SSAB Americas. It also owns subsidiaries Ruukki Construction and Tibnor. The company's product brands include SSAB Domex, Hardox, Docol, GreenCoat, Armox, and Toolox.

SSAB also sponsors the Swedish Steel Prize and has been involved in various government-supported research programs, such as the "Steel Eco-System" initiative.

In 2024, SSAB announced that it would build its €4.5 billion fossil-free steel mill in Luleå, Sweden, rather than in Raahe, Finland. The decision, which was made after considering both locations, is expected to reduce Sweden's carbon dioxide emissions by 7% upon completion in 2028.

== Operations ==
SSAB has its production sites in Sweden, Finland, and the United States. The company also maintains smaller operations elsewhere, including a processing facility in Kunshan near Shanghai, China. and distribution hubs in the Baltic region.

=== Sweden ===
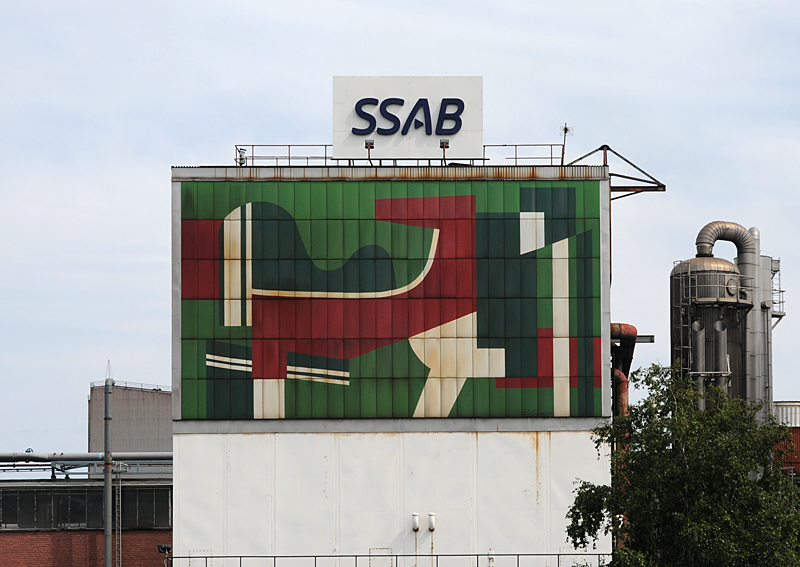
SSAB in Oxelösund

The production is located at Luleå, Borlänge, Oxelösund and Finspång. SSAB is the largest steel sheet manufacturer in Scandinavia, with its blast furnace, coking plant, and steelworks located in Luleå and its rolling mills and coating plants in Borlänge—the initial product is sent from one location to the other via train. The division also has a coil coating line, lamination line, and special steels production. SSAB Special Steels in Oxelösund is the only steelworks in Sweden to have its entire vertical production base in one place, from raw material handling to its rolling plates. Ninety percent of its production is exported, with its chief export partner being Germany. SSAB produces nearly all of the steel plates created in Sweden.

=== Finland ===
SSAB operates two major steel production facilities in Finland, located in Raahe and Hämeenlinna. The Raahe plant, originally established as Rautaruukki in the 1960s to support Finland's heavy industry, is one of the youngest integrated steel plants in Europe. It began operations with its first blast furnace in 1964, followed by an LD steel plant and rolling mills in the subsequent years. The Hämeenlinna facility, which started production in 1972, specialises in processing steel into coated products, including galvanised steel for industries such as automotive manufacturing. It employs approximately 1,000 people. The headquarters for SSAB Europe Oy are located in Hämeenlinna.

=== North America ===
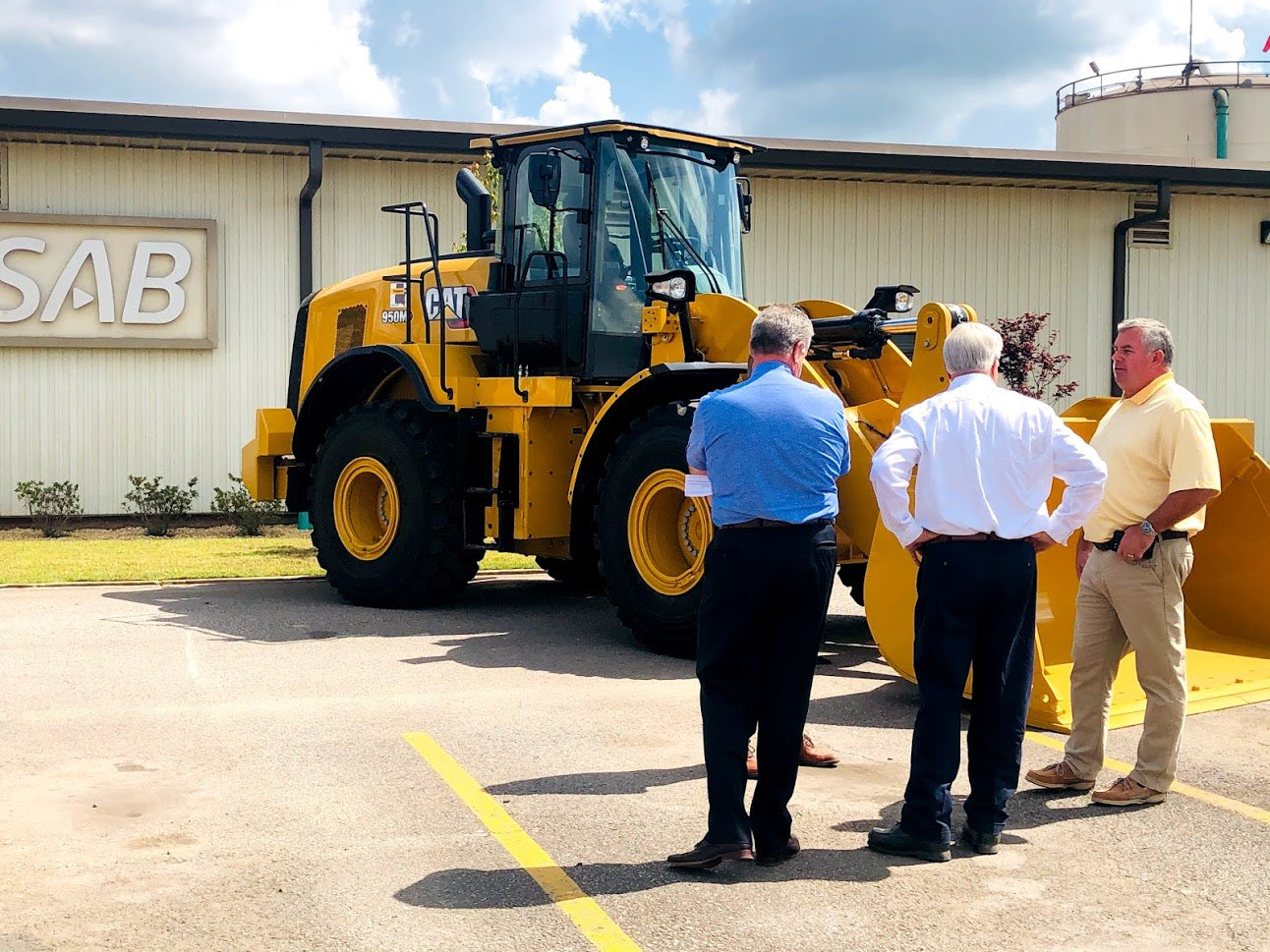
Congressmember Jerry Carl visiting SSAB in Axis, Alabama, in 2021

IPSCO Inc. began as Prairie Pipe Manufacturing Co., Ltd. in Regina, Saskatchewan in 1956, changing its name to Interprovincial Steel and Pipe Corporation, Ltd. in 1960 and IPSCO, Inc. in 1984; the company would later be purchased by SSAB, and is the origin of SSAB's operations in the region. All SSAB operations in North America are now operated as SSAB Americas.

As of 2000, IPSCO had used mini mills to produce flat-rolled steel for 40 years. Late in 2001, the company officially opened an Axis, Alabama, mill (in the Mobile area), with a capacity of 1,250,000 tonnes,. The $US425 million rolling mill, with mill stand housings believed to be the largest one-piece cast mill housings in the world at 350 tons each, uses scrap steel to produce discrete plate and coiled hot rolled plate. Montpelier, Iowa had a similar facility which began operations in 1997, but this one would serve the Gulf coast. On 21 October 2008, SSAB announced a $US460 million expansion of the Axis mill to be completed in 2011. The mill already had 400 employees and 350 contractors.

In May 2007, a deal to acquire IPSCO for $US7.7 billion was announced. At the time, IPSCO's annual production was 4.3 million tonnes, with four steel mills and eleven pipe mills. On 17 July 2008, SSAB announced the completion of the deal. John Tulloch succeeded the retiring David Sutherland as IPSCO president and became an executive vice president of SSAB.

On 17 March 2008, Evraz Group SA announced it would buy SSAB's Canada pipe and plate business and the steel tube business of the American IPSCO unit for $US4.3 billion after steel prices rose and the dollar fell. Evraz also planned to sell some of the American assets for $US1.7 billion to OAO TMK. IPSCO had 4300 employees, with 70% of its operation in the United States and 30% in Canada.

After the sale, SSAB changed the name of its North American operation to SSAB North American Division (NAD), then later to SSAB Americas; headquarters stayed in Lisle, Illinois, USA. Included in this division were steel operations in Mobile and Montpelier, and cut-to-length lines in St. Paul, Minnesota and Houston, Texas; and Toronto, Canada. David Britten succeeded Tulloch as president. Paul Wilson, with 36 years of industry experience, ten of those with SSAB including management of Mobile's steel operation, became the vice president in charge of the American steel operations. In 2018 the SSAB Americas division relocated its headquarters to Mobile, Alabama.

== Brands ==
SSAB's major brands include:

- Hardox
- Strenx
- Docol
- GreenCoat
- Toolox
- Armox
- SSAB Boron
- SSAB Domex
- SSAB Form
- SSAB Laser
- SSAB Weathering
- SSAB Multisteel
- Hardox in my Body
- My Inner Strenx
- Hardox Wearparts

== Carbon footprint ==
SSAB reported Total CO2e emissions (Direct + Indirect) for 31 December 2020 at 9,989 Kt (−766 /-7.1% y-o-y). This is a higher rate of decline than over the period since 4Q'14 (−1.1% CAGR).

SSAB's Total CO2e emissions (Direct + Indirect) (in kilotonnes)
Dec 2014	Dec 2015	Dec 2016	Dec 2017	Dec 2018	Dec 2019	Dec 2020
10,798	10,581	11,154	11,083	10,938	10,755	9,989

== See also ==
- List of Swedish companies
