= Dala Airport =

Borlänge Airport Dala Airport

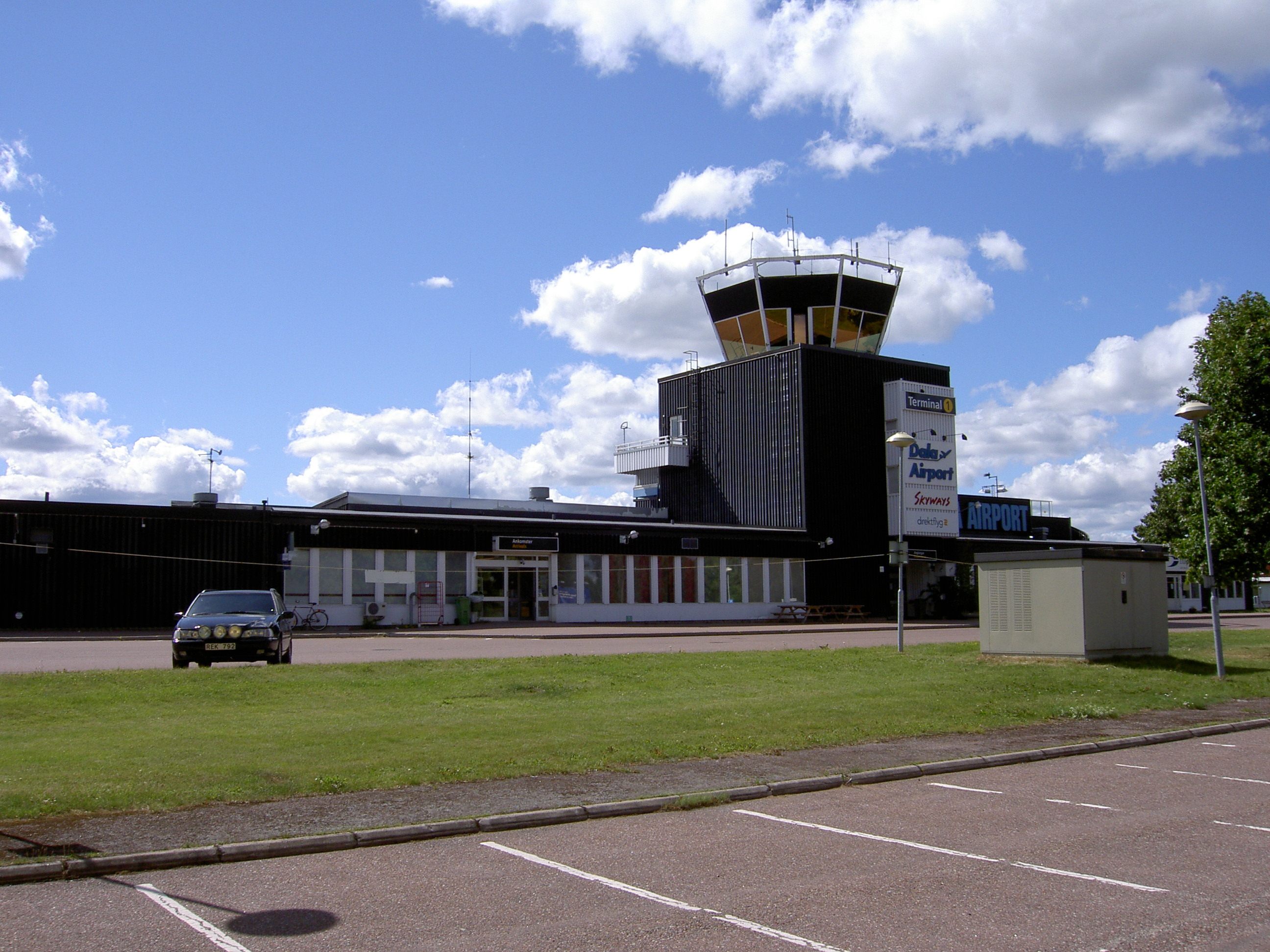
- IATA: BLE; ICAO: ESSD

Summary
- Airport type: Public / Military
- Operator: Dala Airport AB
- Location: Borlänge, Dalarna, Sweden
- Elevation AMSL: 503 ft / 153 m
- Coordinates: 60°25′19″N 015°30′54″E
- Website: dalaflyget.se
- Interactive map of Borlänge Airport

Runways
Direction	Length		Surface
Direction	m	ft	Surface
14/32	2,310	7,579	Asphalt

Statistics (2018)
- Passengers total: 26,421
- International passengers: 23,924
- Domestic passengers: 2,497
- Landings total: 2,433
- Sources: airport web site and DAFIF; Transportstyrelsen

Dala Airport or Borlänge Airport (IATA: BLE, ICAO: ESSD) is situated southeast of Borlänge, a city in the Dalarna province of Sweden. It is also 20 minutes from the city of Falun.

== History ==
The airfield was built during the Second World War and was modernized in 1961. In mid 1960 the first civilian airlines arrived at Dala Airport. A new terminal building was completed in 1972 and Dala Airport AB took over the airport. The airfield was owned by the Swedish military until 2007. The all-time-high number of passengers was 210,000 in 1989. Until around 1992, airlines had monopoly per route, but prices were regulated with a fixed maximum price per seat kilometer. Managers in the public and private sector were freely allowed to choose air for work travel. After 1992 free competition was introduced, and the price regulation was removed. More strict rules for work travel cost for public sector managers were introduced. Smaller routes like Borlänge–Stockholm still had only one operator so prices increased. Necessary routes were supported by the government, which did not include Borlänge since train or car travel times are fairly short. The raised prices caused many business travellers to use train or car, causing losses for the operator, which raised prices and used smaller aircraft, further decreasing passenger figures. In 2006 there were about 33,000 passengers at Borlänge airport, declining from the previous years.

The 166 km (by air) long Stockholm route was closed down in June 2011, then reopened for a short period September 2013-April 2014. In 2006 charter flights started to international tourist destinations. From 2012 international routes have more passengers than domestic. In 2018 the flights, operated by AIS Airlines, to both Gothenburg and Malmö (over Örebro) were closed down), which caused the airport to be without scheduled domestic traffic.

== Airlines and destinations ==
The following airlines operate regular scheduled and charter services to and from Dala Airport:

Airlines	Destinations
Sunclass Airlines	Seasonal charter: Rhodes, Larnaca
TUI fly Nordic	Seasonal charter: Gran Canaria (begins 21 October 2026)

== Ground transportation ==
A bus connects the airport to downtown Borlänge.

== See also ==
- List of the largest airports in the Nordic countries
