= Dalarna University College =

Public university in Falun and Borlänge, Dalarna County, Sweden

Dalarna University
- Högskolan Dalarna
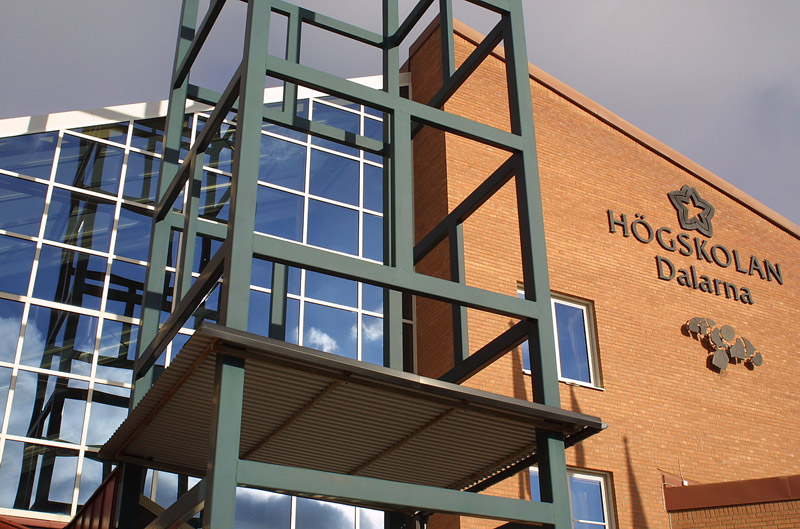
- Type: Public
- Established: 1977; 49 years ago
- Vice-Chancellor: Jörgen Elbe (Acting)
- Administrative staff: 820 (2023)
- Students: 16,000
- Doctoral students: 96
- Location: Falun and Borlänge, Dalarna, Sweden; 60°36′49.68″N 15°39′12.96″E
- Campus: Urban
- Website: www.du.se

Dalarna University (Swedish: Högskolan Dalarna) is a university college (högskola) located in Falun and Borlänge, in Dalarna County, Sweden.

Dalarna University is one of Sweden's more recent institutions of higher education, established in 1977. It is situated in Dalarna, 200 kilometres north-west of the capital Stockholm.

== Background ==
In 2024, the university had 17,430 students, with 14,118 of them studying via distance education to some extent. Compared with 2023, Dalarna University experienced significant growth, with an 18% increase in student numbers. Statistics from the Swedish Council for Higher Education (UHR) from 2025 also show a remarkable 31.2% rise in applicants for international master's programs. This positive trend is reflected throughout Sweden, with 29 out of 31 universities and colleges reporting an increase in international student applicants. The average growth is 17%, however Dalarna University has seen a higher rise.

The campuses are located in Falun, the administrative capital of the province, and in the neighbouring town of Borlänge. In 2024, a new campus in central Borlänge was inaugurated: it offers a modern and effective teaching and learning environment for staff and students.

Dalarna University is deemed qualified by the Swedish National Agency for Higher Education to award Phd degrees in Microdata Analysis, Health and Welfare with Focus on Evidence-Based Practice, Educational Work and most recent Resource-Efficient Built Environments.

Research in Complex Systems and Microdata Analysis at Borlänge campus is carried out in collaboration with business and industry, and increases the competitiveness for trade, IT, transport and tourism in the region. Research in this subject area accounts for some 35 million SEK at the university. The field has some 50 employed researchers and teachers at the Borlänge campus and on top of that a further 30 doctoral students who are able to complete their education at Dalarna University.

=== Locus student accommodation ===
The student accommodation area Locus is located in Tjärna Ängar, a district in Borlänge designated by Swedish police as a vulnerable area, a socially deprived area with a higher crime rate. This makes life insecure for in particular female students who avoid walking alone at night due to persistent harassment. Therefore, the student union recommends relocating the campus to Falun.

== Organisation ==
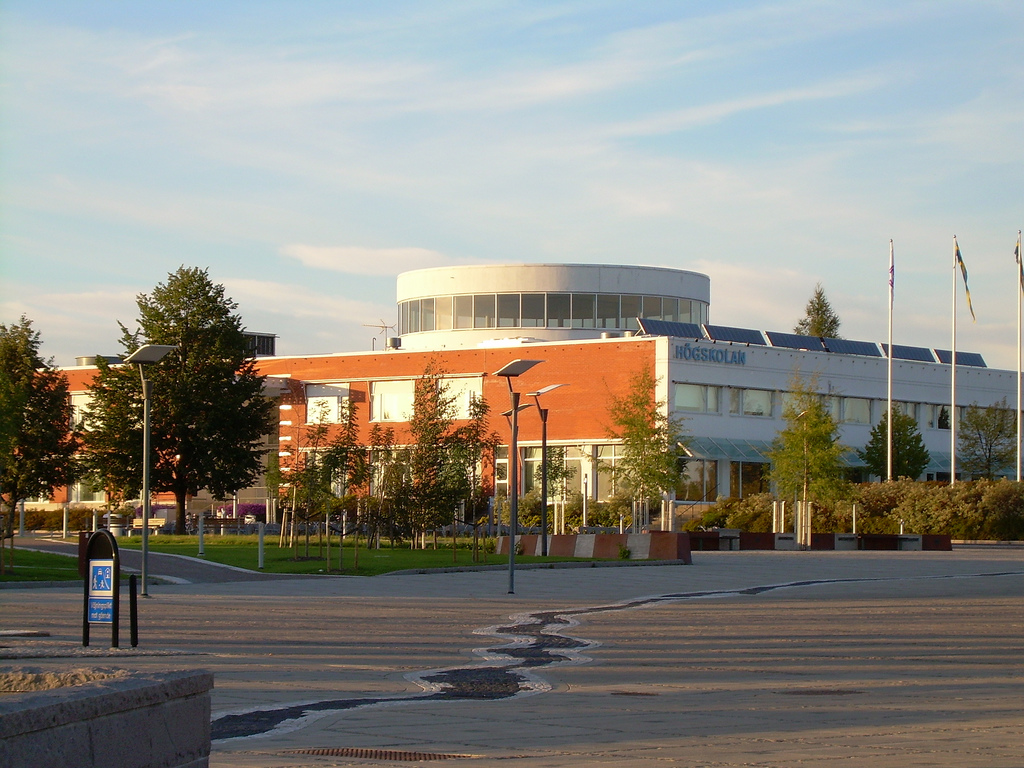
Borlänge campus

Dalarna University was organised into five schools that conduct our research and deliver education in close collaboration with external business and industry, the public sector and society at large.

- School of Teacher Education
- School of Language, Literatures and Learning
- School of Culture and Society
- School of Information and Engineering
- School of Health and Welfare

== See also ==
- List of colleges and universities in Sweden
