= Borlänge Municipality =

Borlänge Municipality Borlänge kommun
- Municipality
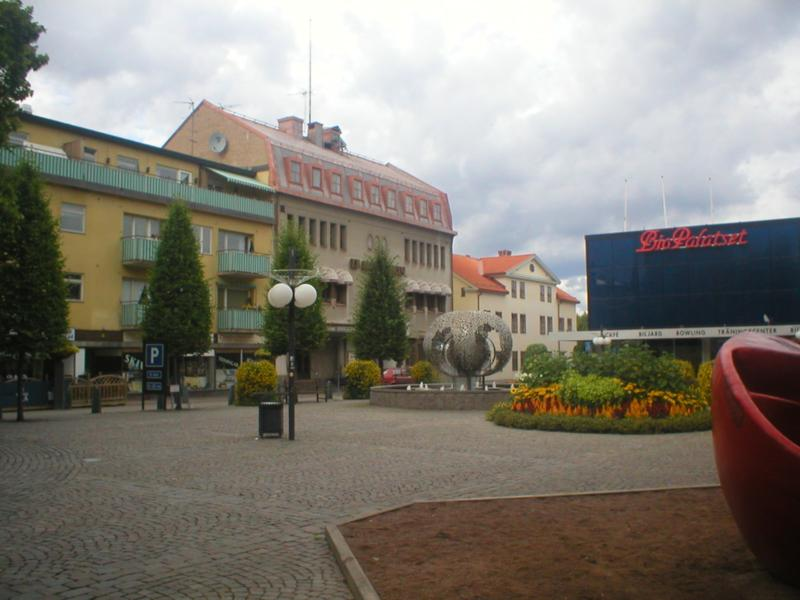
- Sveatorget in Borlänge in 2005

- Coat of arms

- Coordinates: 60°29′N 15°27′E
- Country: Sweden
- County: Dalarna County
- Seat: Borlänge

Area
  - Total: 635.81 km^{2} (245.49 sq mi)
  - Land: 583.87 km^{2} (225.43 sq mi)
  - Water: 51.94 km^{2} (20.05 sq mi)
- Area as of 1 January 2014.

Population (30 June 2025)
  - Total: 51,469
  - Density: 88.151/km^{2} (228.31/sq mi)
- Time zone: UTC+1 (CET)
  - Summer (DST): UTC+2 (CEST)
- ISO 3166 code: SE
- Province: Dalarna
- Municipal code: 2081
- Website: www.borlange.se
- Density is calculated using land area only.

Borlänge Municipality (Swedish: Borlänge kommun) is a municipality in Dalarna County in central Sweden, with an area of 586.4 km^{2}. The municipality has a population of 47,640 (2007). The municipal seat is Borlänge.

The present municipality was created in 1971 when the City of Borlänge (itself instituted as a city in 1944) was reunited with the rural municipality of Stora Tuna, from which it had been detached in 1898.

== Demographics ==
This is a demographic table based on Borlänge Municipality's electoral districts in the 2022 Swedish general election sourced from SVT's election platform, in turn taken from SCB official statistics.

In total there were 52,132 residents, including 38,802 Swedish citizens of voting age. 49.0% voted for the left coalition and 49.5% for the right coalition.

Location	Residents	Citizen adults	Left vote	Right vote	Employed	Swedish parents	Foreign heritage	Income SEK	Degree
Location			%	%					
Bergslagsbyn	2,172	1,675	47.8	50.9	84	84	16	26,632	36
Bullermyren	2,081	1,188	65.5	30.3	49	32	68	14,293	23
Centrum-Mjälga	1,475	1,112	45.0	53.8	79	81	19	26,571	36
Centrum N	1,559	1,336	51.9	46.3	78	77	23	24,246	39
Domnarvet V	1,973	1,470	49.2	49.1	86	89	11	29,443	42
Domnarvet Ö	1,983	1,540	49.0	50.2	82	84	16	26,105	33
Färjegårdarna-Årby	2,114	1,602	48.7	50.1	88	89	11	27,702	44
Gylle-Åselby	2,298	1,813	42.3	56.7	87	92	8	27,754	34
Gylletäppan	1,760	1,461	45.6	53.1	86	86	14	26,385	35
Hagalund N	1,972	1,436	51.5	45.7	64	56	44	19,297	29
Hagalund V	1,990	1,654	49.1	49.6	78	77	23	23,631	35
Hagalund Ö	1,154	1,178	54.1	44.7	79	70	30	22,299	34
Hushagen-Forssa	1,696	1,492	54.3	44.1	80	86	14	24,745	36
Jakobsgårdarna	2,094	1,353	60.5	36.4	63	47	53	19,460	27
Kvarnsveden S	1,281	1,000	52.0	47.1	85	89	11	27,240	39
Kvarnsveden V	2,139	1,670	48.8	49.9	83	90	10	26,487	38
Kvarnsveden Ö	1,338	1,087	47.1	51.7	85	88	12	26,692	38
Kyrkbygden-S Tuna	2,097	1,677	38.7	59.9	87	94	6	26,181	33
Mats Knuts-Nygårdarna	1,986	1,343	49.5	49.2	86	86	14	28,409	47
Norr Amsberg	1,537	1,207	39.9	58.7	85	88	12	28,104	34
Ornäs	1,801	1,382	44.4	54.8	85	93	7	29,557	38
Skräddarbacken	1,864	1,403	47.7	50.9	84	89	11	27,742	43
Tjärna Allé	2,408	1,058	86.1	11.8	36	11	89	9,044	21
Tjärna Ängar-Paradiset	2,071	1,304	58.9	39.3	61	45	55	19,437	31
Tjärna Ängar-Ö Tjärna	2,113	1,272	56.1	42.9	67	49	51	21,664	27
Torsång	1,705	1,312	39.9	59.4	93	95	5	31,805	48
V Tuna-Idkerberget	1,716	1,405	34.8	63.4	85	93	7	26,120	24
Östermalm	1,755	1,372	46.1	52.6	78	69	31	23,971	35
Source: SVT

== Riksdag elections ==
Year	%	Votes	V	S	MP	C	L	KD	M	SD	NyD	Left	Right
1973	91.1	28,033	4.7	53.4		28.1	5.2	1.6	6.5			58.1	39.8
1976	91.9	30,166	4.2	52.9		25.3	8.1	1.3	7.9			57.1	41.3
1979	90.2	30,045	5.5	54.2		18.4	7.5	1.3	12.3			59.7	38.2
1982	91.5	31,434	5.5	57.2	1.8	14.6	3.9	1.3	15.5			62.6	34.0
1985	89.3	30,769	5.9	54.2	2.4	11.1	10.9		14.5			60.1	36.5
1988	84.6	29,220	6.7	52.1	6.0	10.5	10.6	2.5	10.7			64.8	31.8
1991	85.4	29,639	5.3	47.3	3.2	8.0	7.7	5.9	15.2		6.4	52.6	36.7
1994	86.2	30,506	7.5	55.5	5.7	6.3	5.6	3.0	14.5		1.0	68.7	29.4
1998	80.6	28,150	15.2	44.7	5.4	4.1	3.3	9.2	15.0			65.3	31.5
2002	78.2	27,313	10.0	48.6	5.2	6.2	9.5	6.2	10.4	1.8		63.7	32.3
2006	80.7	28,333	7.1	45.5	4.4	7.3	5.7	4.4	18.8	3.5		57.0	36.2
2010	84.9	30,756	6.6	39.6	6.0	5.4	5.0	3.5	23.2	9.2		52.2	37.1
2014	86.2	31,740	6.2	37.3	5.6	5.1	3.7	3.2	18.0	17.7		49.0	30.0
2018	87.3	32,460	7.6	32.7	3.9	7.4	4.4	5.1	17.1	20.3		51.6	46.9

== Education ==
- Dalarna University College
- Soltorgsgymnasiet

== Notable natives ==
- Jussi Björling, tenor
- Lars Frölander, swimmer
- Mando Diao, rock band
- Sugarplum Fairy, pop band
- Per Fosshaug, bandy player
- Dozer, stoner rock band
- Erik Eriksson, Centre Party's first chairman
- Lars Jonsson, ice hockey player
- Sator, rock band
- Linda Carlsson, musician (also known as Miss Li)
- Tove Alexandersson, orienteering, ski-orienteering and skyrunning world champion
- Per Johansson, swimmer
