= Rootvälta =

Swedish reggae band

Rootvälta is a reggae band from Borlänge in the county of Dalarna, Sweden. The band was founded in 1988.

The band has released four albums to date. Their name is taken from the Swedish word Rotvälta, meaning windthrow, but spelled with a double 'o' as a reference to roots.

== Discography ==
- Songs from the Fallen Tree (1994)
- In Session (2000)
- New Chapter (2006)
- Homegrown (2011)

== Band members ==
- Mattias Björkgren (Lead vocals, rhythm guitar)
- Jan Gävert (Bass, Lead and backing vocals)
- Micael Berglund (Drums, toast)
- Thomas Berglund (Percussion, backing vocals)
- Jan Wikström (Keyboard)
- Nicklas Karlsson (Lead guitar, lead & backing vocals)
- Andreas Norén (Keyboard)
