= Sugarplum Fairy =

Swedish pop-rock band

Sugarplum Fairy (band)
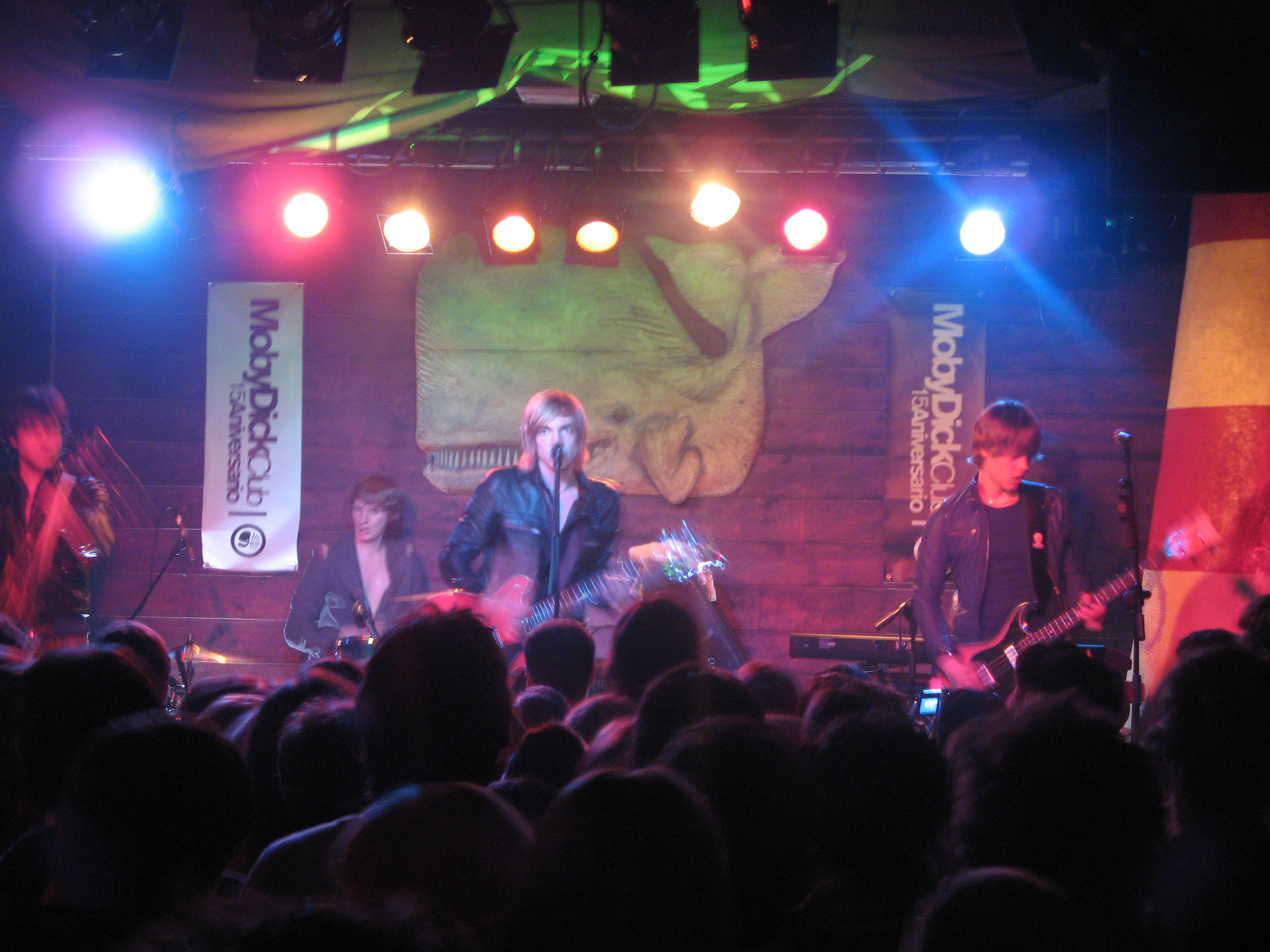
- Sugarplum Fairy in 2007

Background information
- Origin: Borlänge, Sweden
- Genres: Pop rock, Garage rock, Alternative rock
- Years active: 1998-2013
- Members: Viktor Norén; Carl Norén; David Hebert; Jonas Karlsson
- Past members: Kristian Gidlund
- Website: www.sugarplumfairy.nu

Sugarplum Fairy is a pop-rock band from Borlänge, Sweden. The members took the name from a version of the Beatles' song "A Day in the Life" where John Lennon counts the song in by saying "sugar-plum-fairy, sugar-plum-fairy". Sugarplum Fairy was founded in 1998 by brothers Viktor and Carl Norén and by Kristian Gidlund.

The band released several demos before being signed to EMI Records in 2004, releasing the EP Stay Young to generally positive reviews. Later they released their first single, "Sweet Jackie", from their first full-length album Young & Armed released later that year (September 29, 2004). The band toured heavily in Sweden, Japan and Germany, and released the debut album in different editions in both Japan and Germany in early 2005. In 2006 they put out their second record, "First Round First Minute". A third album followed in 2008, including a cover of The Hollies' "Bus Stop". In 2009 the band went on hiatus.

In 2011 drummer Kristian Gidlund was diagnosed with stomach cancer. He died from the illness in 2013.

Apart from their music, the band is also famous for the fact that the two singers in the band are brothers of Gustaf Norén, former singer in Mando Diao.

== Members ==
- Viktor Norén (born 1985) - lead vocals and backing vocals, guitars and percussions (1998-present) - Later part of duo Gustaf & Viktor Norén
- Carl Norén (born 1983) - lead vocals and backing vocals, guitars, harmonica and organ (1998-present)
- David Hebert (born 1986) - basses (1998-present)
- Jonas Karlsson (born 1985) - guitars and backing vocals (1998-present)
- Kristian Gidlund - drums (1998-2013)

== Discography ==
=== Albums ===
Year	Title	Peak Chart Positions		
Year	Title	AUT	GER	SWE
2004	Young & Armed	-	49	25
2006	First Round First Minute	50	40	20
2008	The Wild One	66	92	22

=== EPs ===
- 2004: Stay Young EP

=== Singles ===
Year	Title	Peak Chart Positions	
Year	Title	GER	SWE
2004	"Stay Young"	-	16
2004	"Sweet Jackie"	72	30
2005	"Far Away from Man"	-	-
2005	"Sail Beyond Doubt"	-	-
2005	"Morning Miss Lisa"	-	-
2006	"She"/"Last Chance"	-	60
2005	"Marigold"	-	-
2007	"Let It Try"	-	-
2007	"The Soul of the Sun"	-	-
2008	"The Escapologist"	-	-
2008	"Never Thought (I'd Say That It's Alright)"	-	-
2008	"Bus Stop"	-	-
2009	"You Can't Kill Rock'n'Roll"	-	-
