= Borlänge =

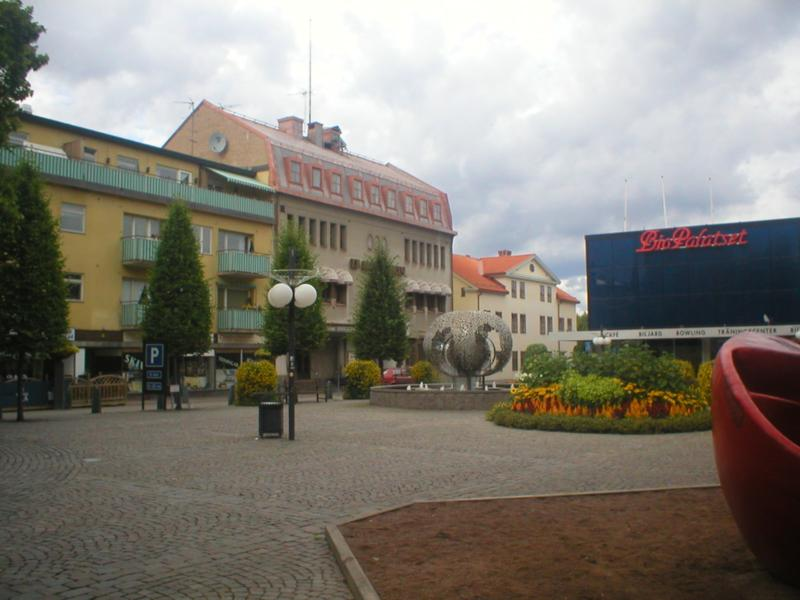
- Sveatorget in Borlänge in 2005

- Location within Dalarna Location within Sweden
- Coordinates: 60°29′08″N 15°26′11″E
- Country: Sweden
- Province: Dalarna
- County: Dalarna County
- Municipality: Borlänge Municipality
- Founded: 1944

Area
  - Total: 34.36 km^{2} (13.27 sq mi)
- Elevation: 151 m (495 ft)

Population (2017)
  - Total: 51,604
  - Density: 1,502/km^{2} (3,890/sq mi)
- Time zone: UTC+1 (CET)
  - Summer (DST): UTC+2 (CEST)
- Postal codes: 781 xx, 784 xx
- Climate: Dfb
- Website: Official website

Borlänge ([ˈbôːˌɭɛŋːɛ]) is a locality in Dalarna County, Sweden, with 44,898 inhabitants as of 2020. It is the seat of the Borlänge Municipality and the largest urban centre in the province of Dalarna. As of 2017 it had a total population of 51,604 inhabitants.

== Geography ==
Borlänge lies along the Dalälven, downstream from the confluence of the Österdalälven and Västerdalälven at Djurås. After the confluence, the Dalälven flows eastwards past Borlänge. The wider Nedre Dalälven landscape downstream is characterized by bays, lakes, tributaries and waterways, rapids, ravines, river meadows and shore grasslands. The area forms a transition between the northern coniferous forest region and the southern broadleaf deciduous forest region and was designated the UNESCO biosphere reserve Nedre Dalälven River Landscape in 2011.

== History ==
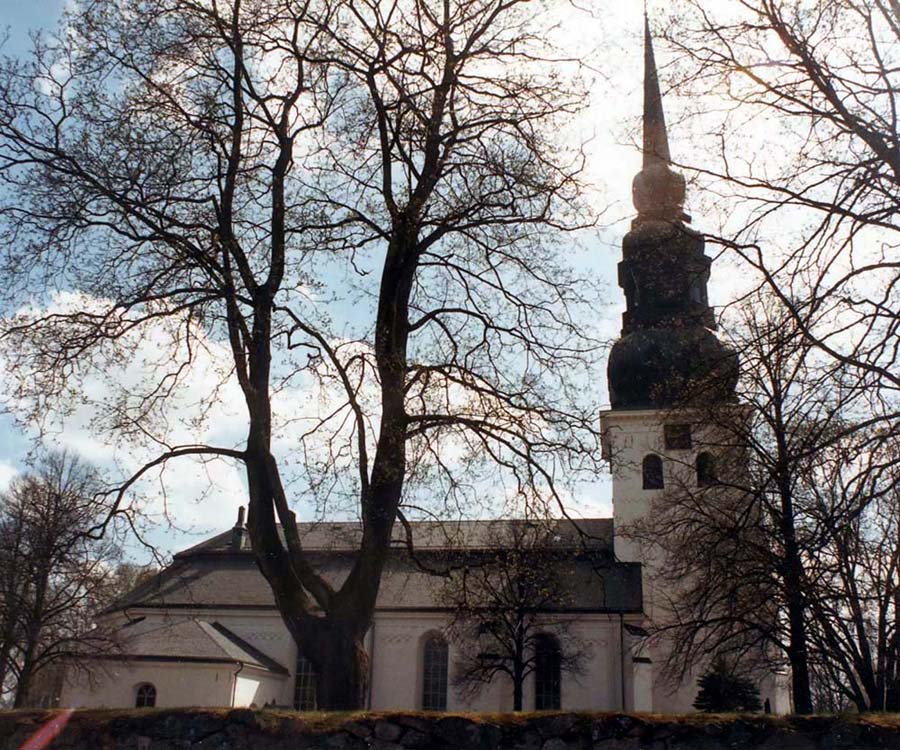
Stora Tuna Church, open as Dalecarlia Cathedral by 1469; its parish and graveyard were established in the 13th century.

Originally Borlänge was the name of a tiny village, and traces back to at least the 1390s. The village was insignificant up until about 1870. In 1872 the construction of Domnarfvets Jernverk, the ironworks of neighbouring village Domnarvet started. In 1875 a railway between Falun and Ludvika, via Borlänge was inaugurated. The railway station made Borlänge a strategically important junction for servicing the ironworks.

In 1898, Borlänge was granted privileges by the national Swedish government as a market town (Swedish: köping) with about 1,300 inhabitants, but still today it belongs to the Church of Sweden's regionally historically dominant parish of Stora Tuna, centered on a large medieval church by that name (meaning great enclosed farmyards), now located in a rural district east of the city. In 1898, the Stora Kopparbergs Bergslag - the owner of the ironworks in Domnarvet at the time - built a papermill in an adjacent village to Borlänge called Kvarnsveden, upstream from Domnarvet. Many area residents emigrated to the United States in the late 19th and early 20th centuries.

In 1944, the City of Borlänge was incorporated after the market town joined the industrial towns of Domnarvet and Kvarnsveden. In 1971 the municipality of Borlänge was established when the Stora Tuna municipality merged with the City of Borlänge.

From the 1940s onward, politics in the municipality has been dominated by the Social Democratic Party.

In the early 1970s, the Kvarnsvedens Pappersbruk paper mill and the Domnarvets Jernverk steel mill had a high demand for employees.

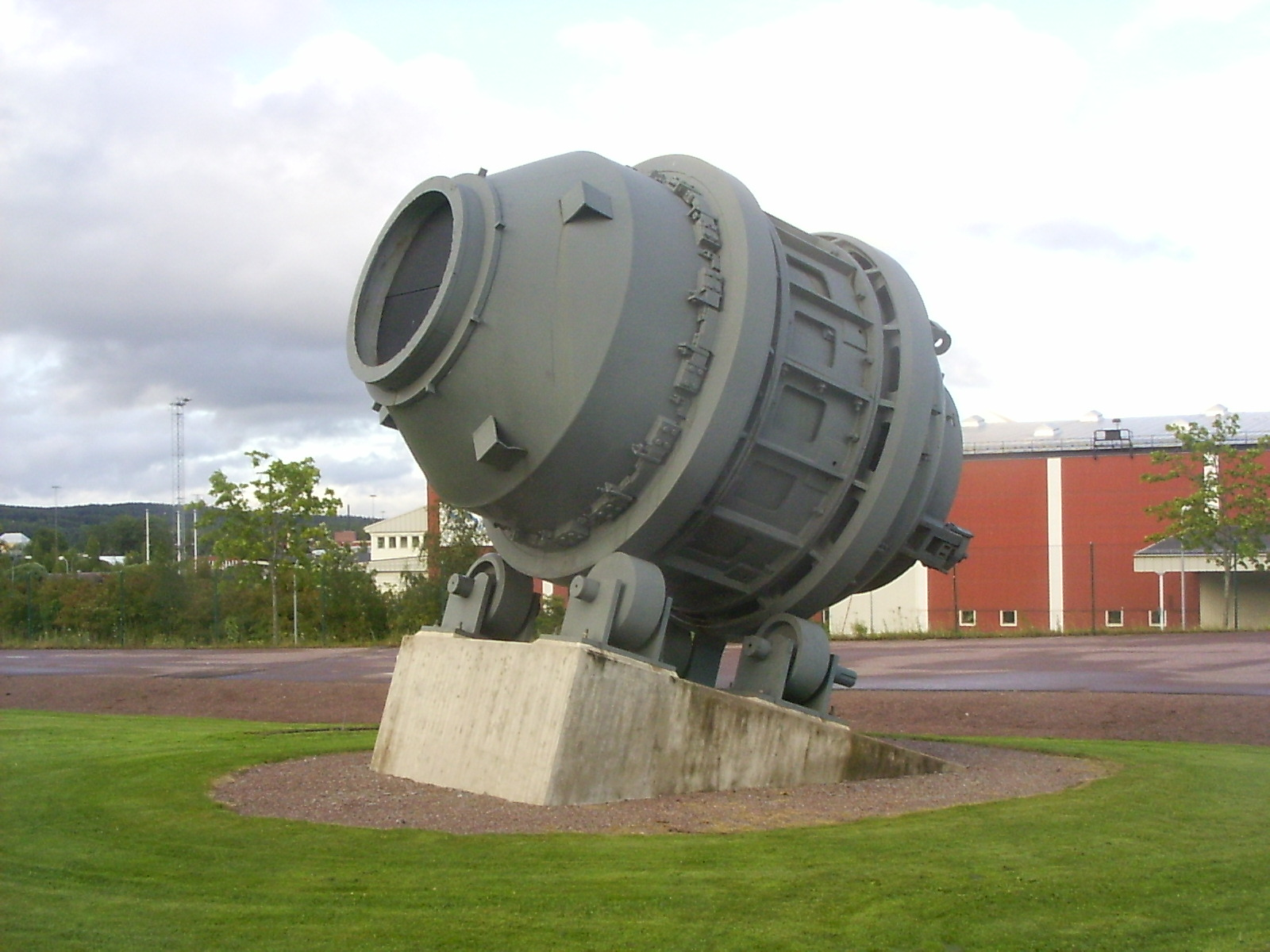
A Kaldo converter on display near SSAB's western gate in Borlänge

During the steel crisis of the 1970s, the nationalized Domnarvet works became part of SSAB. In 1981, the plant's four blast furnaces and two remaining Kaldo converters were shut down, as steel production was restructured around the rolling operations. The Domnarvet site subsequently developed around its hot strip rolling mill.

Between 1970 and 1974, the Tjärna Ängar Million Programme district was built.

In the 1990s, Borlänge had the highest crime rate per thousand inhabitants in Sweden, dominated by violence and theft.

== Climate ==
Climate data for Borlange (1991–2020)
Month	Jan	Feb	Mar	Apr	May	Jun	Jul	Aug	Sep	Oct	Nov	Dec	Year
Mean daily maximum °C (°F)	−1.0 (30.2)	−0.2 (31.6)	4.1 (39.4)	10.1 (50.2)	15.8 (60.4)	19.6 (67.3)	22.1 (71.8)	20.5 (68.9)	15.4 (59.7)	8.7 (47.7)	3.3 (37.9)	0.2 (32.4)	9.9 (49.8)
Mean daily minimum °C (°F)	−6.9 (19.6)	−6.8 (19.8)	−4.1 (24.6)	−0.3 (31.5)	4.5 (40.1)	8.8 (47.8)	11.3 (52.3)	10.2 (50.4)	6.5 (43.7)	2.1 (35.8)	−1.7 (28.9)	−5.5 (22.1)	1.5 (34.7)
Average precipitation mm (inches)	38.1 (1.50)	29.9 (1.18)	30.9 (1.22)	36.0 (1.42)	54.8 (2.16)	73.1 (2.88)	83.7 (3.30)	81.6 (3.21)	49.9 (1.96)	62.5 (2.46)	48.4 (1.91)	43.3 (1.70)	632.2 (24.9)
Average precipitation days (≥ 0.1 mm)	15.9	13.9	12.0	11.3	13.5	14.9	15.6	16.0	13.6	15.2	17.2	17.2	176.3
Source: World Meteorological Organization

== Demographics ==
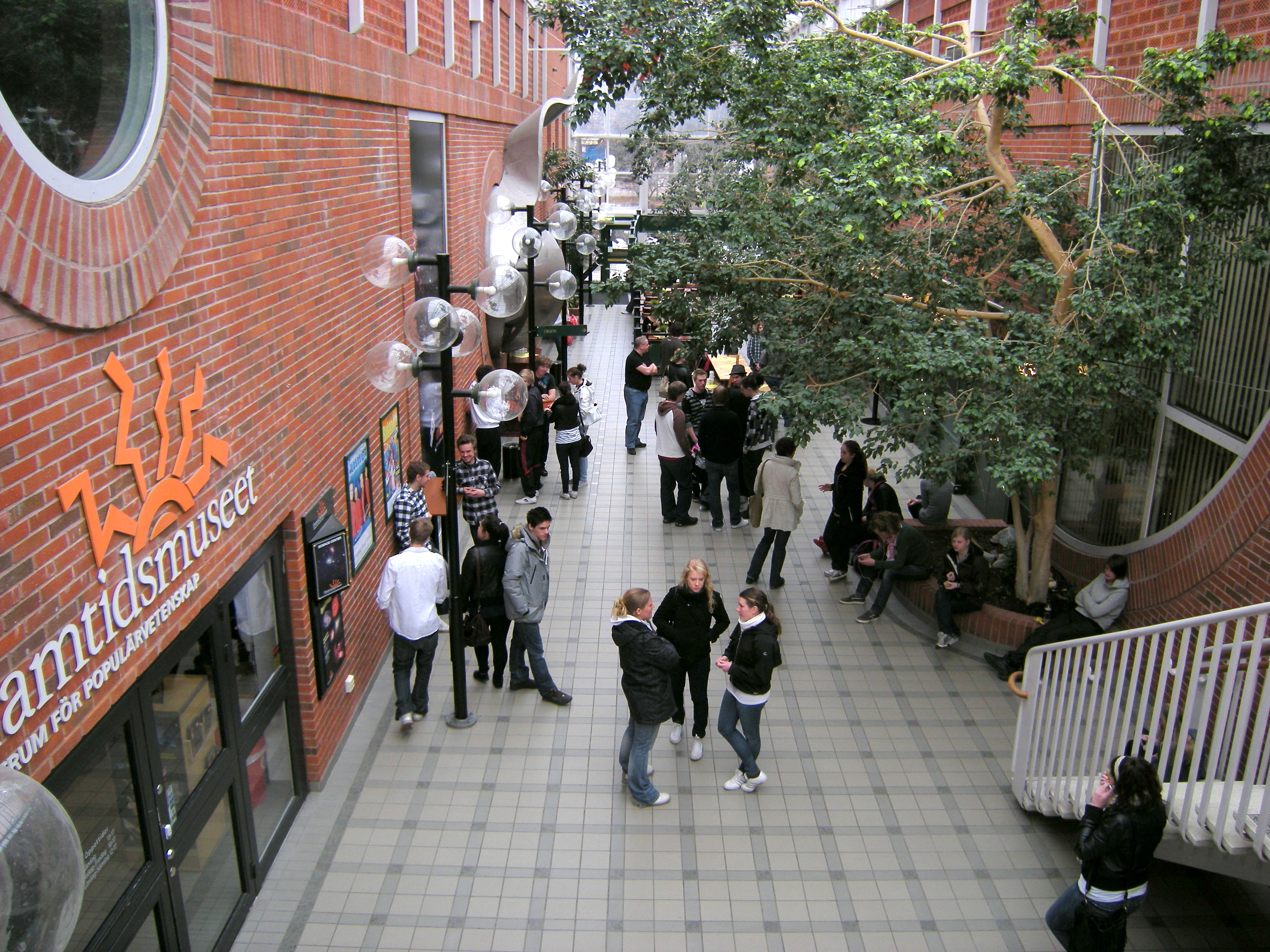
Interior of the Borlänge People's House (Folkets hus).

According to the Borlänge Municipality, as of 2017, Borlänge had a population of 51,604 inhabitants. 11,693 residents in the city are of foreign origin, comprising 22.7% of the total population. Of these individuals, 8,837 were born abroad and 2,856 were born in Sweden. Most of the residents of foreign background come from Asia, Africa, other Nordic countries, and other parts of Europe.

According to the Borlänge Municipality, in the 1990s, most foreign-born residents of Borlänge arrived from Southern Europe, due to the civil wars in Yugoslavia. During the 2000s, immigrants in the city primarily came from Somalia, Iraq and Turkey. The Somalia-born immigrants mainly arrived via family reunification. This migration had decreased by the following decade, with most newcomers in Borlänge now consisting of asylum immigrants from Syria and Eritrea. As of 2016, there are 472 refugees in the municipality, most of whom originate from Syria (218), Eritrea (121), and Somalia (56). The newer asylum immigrants in the city largely emigrated from Syria and Eritrea.

As of 2017, the most common countries of origin for total foreign-born individuals residing in Borlänge are

Somalia (3,114)
Finland (1,570)
Syria (1,032)
Iraq (1,028)
Turkey (926)
Eritrea (350)
Thailand (322)
Iran (240)
Ex-Yugoslavia (197)
Norway (174).

== Districts ==
Borlänge's official districts and their inhabitants from 1975 to 2010:

District	1975	1990	2010
Bullermyren	4,000	2,700	2,800
Centrum, Östermalm	3,900	3,300	3,800
Domnarvet, Medväga, Barkargärdet	2,900	3,300	3,600
Gylle, Åselby, Hytting, Bro	5,200	4,200	4,100
Hagalund	4,700	3,800	4,100
Idkerberget, Tuna Hästberg	750	650	550
Jakobsgårdarna		1,300	1,900
Ornäs, Dalsjö, Kyna m.fl.	900	1,300	1,400
Romme m.fl.	2,500	2,200	2,300
Skräddarbacken		3,100	2,700
Tjärna Ängar	3,200	1,900	2,900
Torsång m.fl	500	1,200	1,300
Väster Tuna	1,400	1,700	1,800

=== Tjärna ängar ===
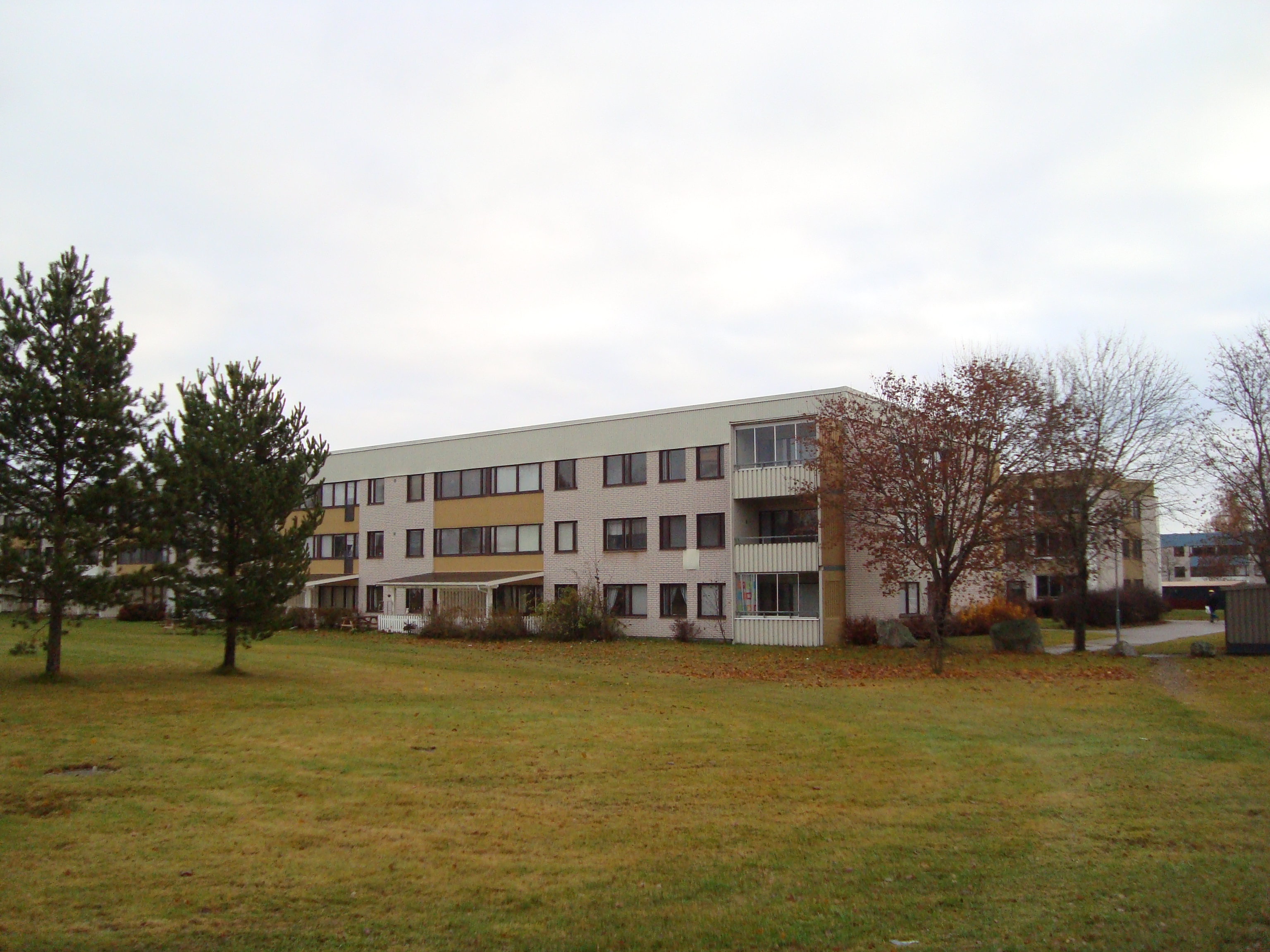
Typical residential buildings in Tjärna ängar.

According to the Borlänge Municipality, many of the city's inhabitants with a foreign background live in the neighborhoods of Jakobsgårdarna and Tjärna Ängar (nicknamed "Lilla Mogadishu" because of its many Somalia-born inhabitants).

An agreement between the Borlänge Municipality and the Swedish Migration Board to receive 30 refugees per year has contributed to the population growth, with many arriving via family reunification. Additionally, people have relocated to the city from other areas. Many are young, with few individuals older than 60 years of age. Over a five-year period, the number of inhabitants in Tjärna Ängar increased considerably, as 1,000 young persons relocated to the neighborhood. The new arrivals principally came from two or three foreign backgrounds, and included university students and people who had emigrated from abroad.

In its December 2015 report, the Swedish Police Authority placed the Borlänge's Tjärna Ängar district in the second highest category of urban areas with high crime rates. In the summer of 2016, there was widespread vandalism, cars were torched and when firefighters arrived, they were attacked with stones and had to wait for police to escort them in order to complete their mission. The Dalarna University College has student accommodation in the area where female students are sexually harassed by the local male youth on a regular basis and avoid going outdoors after sunset.

== Economy ==
=== Employers ===
Borlänge has for a long time been an industrial town surrounding the iron mill of Domnarvet (SSAB) and the paper mill of Kvarnsveden (Stora Enso). As a city with a structure heavily divided by rails and roads, with a modern city center, Borlänge also houses the head office for a state authority - the National Swedish Transport Administration Trafikverket.

Borlänge has for a long time been an industrial town surrounding the iron mill of Domnarvet (SSAB) and the paper mill of Kvarnsveden (Stora Enso). As a city with a structure heavily divided by rails and roads, with a modern city center, Borlänge also houses the head office for a state authority - the National Swedish Transport Administration Trafikverket. Dalarna University (Högskolan Dalarna) was founded in 1977 as Högskolan i Falun/Borlänge but was renamed Högskolan Dalarna in 1996, and has campuses in both Borlänge and Falun. Its current Campus Borlänge, completed in June 2024, hosts education and research in areas including technology, engineering, business, economics, tourism, data science and business intelligence. The university had 17,430 registered students in 2025, with 81% studying remotely.

=== Transport ===
Borlänge Central is a railway junction connecting routes toward Falun, Mora, and Ludvika, and remains part of the regional rail network linking Borlänge with Gävle and Stockholm.

Borlänge is served by Dala Airport which is located 8 kilometres (5 mi) southeast of Borlänge. The nearest major airport is Stockholm Arlanda Airport, located 214 kilometres (133 mi) southeast of Borlänge town centre.

== Sport ==
The football club IK Brage, founded in 1925 and named after the Norse god has played 18 seasons in the Swedish Premier Division, Allsvenskan. The club plays in green and white and hosts its home matches at Borlänge Energi Arena (formerly Domnarvsvallen).

Dalkurd FF was founded in Borlänge in 2004 by members of the Kurdish diaspora. The club reached Allsvenskan after finishing second in the Superettan in 2017. It moved its senior operations to Uppsala in 2017 and played its 2018 home matches at Gavlevallen in Gävle. The club's operating company, DK Elit AB, was declared bankrupt in July 2024, and the club was subsequently relegated to Division 4 for the 2025 season. In March 2025, Dalkurd paused all operations during a severe financial crisis.

Domnarvsvallen was renamed Borlänge Energi Arena in 2023 after a naming-rights agreement between IK Brage and the municipal utility company Borlänge Energi. The arena was inaugurated in 1925 and has been IK Brage's home since then; its recorded attendance record is 14,206, set in 1965. Artificial turf was installed in 2009.

The handball club Borlänge HK won the Swedish Women's Championship 3 times during the 1970's.

Other sports clubs located in Borlänge include:

- Forssa BK
- IF Tunabro
- Islingby IK
- Kvarnsvedens IK
- Stora Tuna OK

The 2008 Women's Bandy World Championship was also arranged with Borlänge as the main venue.

In 1999 the large orienteering competition O-Ringen was held around Borlänge, gathering 15 238 participants.

The 1993 World Gliding Championships were held at the Borlänge Airport, east of the town.

== Music ==
Borlänge has been associated with many musicians and bands including Mando Diao, Sugarplum Fairy and Miss Li. The city also hosted BoomTown Music Education, a popular-music education programme associated with Luleå University of Technology but was shut down in 2014 after it ran out of funding..

The Peace & Love festival began in Borlänge in 1999. The original organization filed for bankruptcy in 2013, after which the festival returned in 2014 under the name Peace & Love World Forum and later reverted to the Peace & Love name. The festival was held again in smaller form, with 2019 being the final festival; the planned 2020 event was cancelled during the COVID-19 pandemic, and the companies behind the festival were subsequently declared bankrupt.

The year that the Peace & Love festival went bankrupt it was announced that a new festival,, was coming to Borlänge. The festival was scheduled to take place for the first time on July 8-10, 2021, but due to the Covid-19 pandemic, the premiere had to be postponed and took place after the restrictions were lifted in July 2022, it attracted 17,000 visitors and the lineup included Veronica Maggio, Hoffmaestro, Newkid, Hov1, Myra Granberg, Anis Don Demina and Johnossi

=== Notable musical groups ===
- Stonewall Noise Orchestra, rock band
- Mando Diao, rock band
- Twilight Force, power metal band
- Astral Doors, heavy metal band
- Dozer, stoner rock band
- Greenleaf, stoner rock band
- Sator, rock band (earlier Sator Codex)
- Rootvälta, reggae band
- Sugarplum Fairy, rock band
- Anekdoten, prog band

== Notable people ==
- Simon Aspelin, tennis player
- Jens Bergenström, hockey player
- Jussi Björling, tenor
- Maja Dahlqvist, cross-country skier
- Mattias Ekholm, - NHL Hockey Player for Edmonton Oilers
- Erik Eriksson, Centre Party's first chairman
- Tomas Forslund, ice hockey player
- Per Fosshaug, bandy player
- Lars Frölander, swimmer
- Nils Patrik Johansson, heavy metal singer
- Lars Jonsson, ice hockey player
- Gabriel Karlsson, hockey player
- Miss Li, musician
- Lasse Nilsson, football player
- Gustaf Norén, musician
- Per Olov Qvist (born 1948), Swedish film critic
- Mattias Ritola, hockey player
- Johan Olof Wallin, archbishop, poet and psalmist
- Erling Persson, fashion designer and founder of H&M.

== Education ==
Dalarna University (Högskolan Dalarna) has campuses in both Borlänge and Falun and was founded in 1977. Its central Borlänge campus was completed in 2024 and hosts programmes and research in technology, engineering, business, economics, tourism, data science and business intelligence.

- Soltorgsgymnasiet
- Hagagymnasiet
- Rytmus musikgymnasium
- Erikslundgymnasiet
- NTI Gymnasiet
