= Oxelösund Municipality =

Oxelösund Municipality Oxelösunds kommun
- Municipality
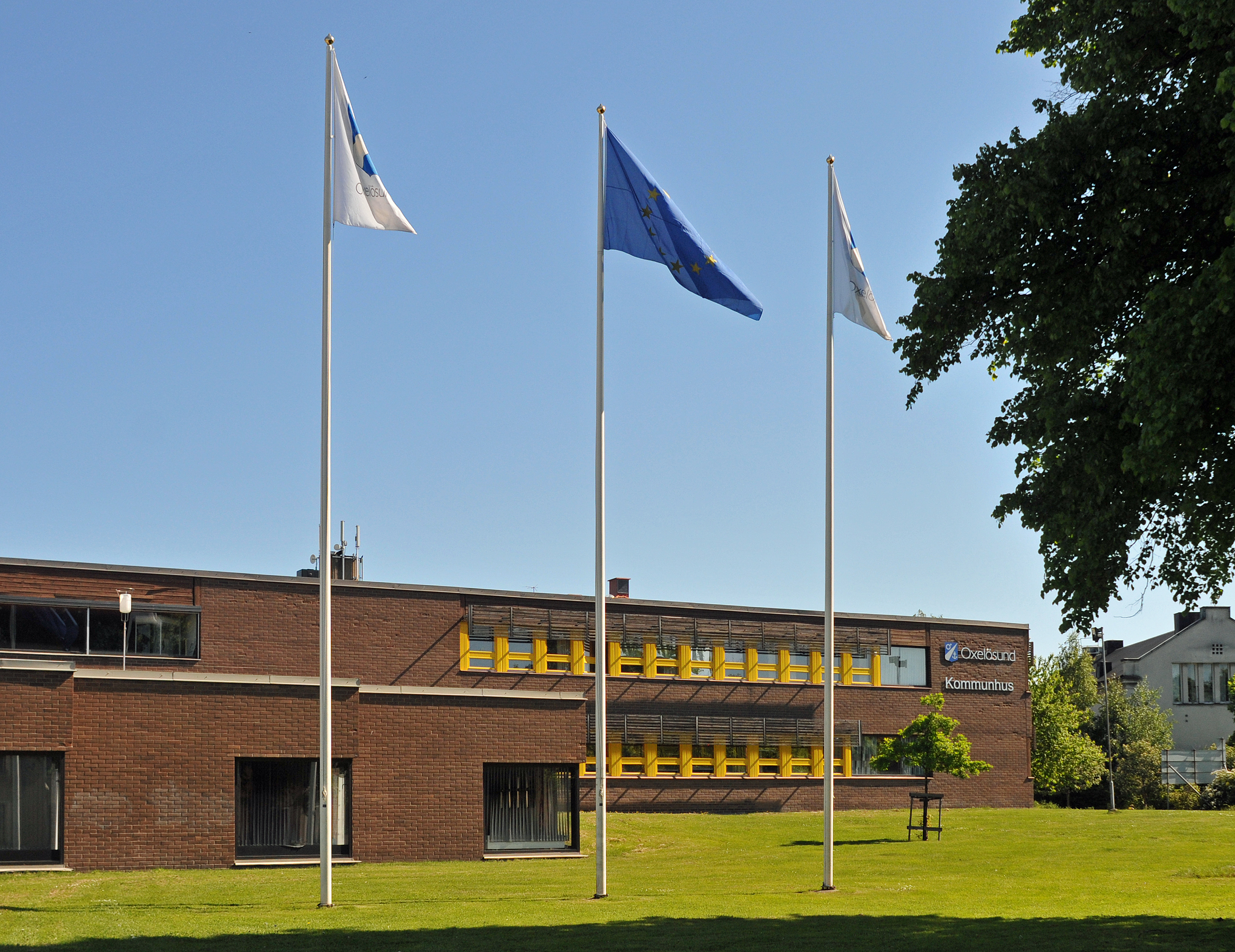
- Oxelösund City Hall in June 2013

- Coat of arms

- Coordinates: 58°40′N 17°07′E
- Country: Sweden
- County: Södermanland County
- Seat: Oxelösund

Area
  - Total: 746.54 km^{2} (288.24 sq mi)
  - Land: 35.39 km^{2} (13.66 sq mi)
  - Water: 711.15 km^{2} (274.58 sq mi)
- Area as of 1 January 2014.

Population (30 June 2025)
  - Total: 12,001
  - Density: 339.1/km^{2} (878.3/sq mi)
- Time zone: UTC+1 (CET)
  - Summer (DST): UTC+2 (CEST)
- ISO 3166 code: SE
- Province: Södermanland
- Municipal code: 0481
- Website: www.oxelosund.se

Oxelösund Municipality (Swedish: Oxelösunds kommun) is a municipality in Södermanland County in southeast Sweden. Its seat is located in the city of Oxelösund.

In 1950 the Nikolai Rural municipality was dissolved. One part formed the then City of Oxelösund, one of the last newly created cities of Sweden. The rest of Nikolai was incorporated into the neighbouring City of Nyköping. In 1971 the city became a unitary municipality without addition of territory.

Still marked by its industrial past, the politics was historically dominated by the Social Democratic Party, and the industry by the harbour and iron works.

== Geography ==
It covers a peninsula in the Baltic Sea, and borders by land only on Nyköping Municipality. With an area of 35.75 square kilometres (13.80 sq mi), it is one of Sweden's smallest municipalities.

== Elections since the 1972 municipal reform ==
=== Riksdag ===
No boundary changes. The Sweden Democrats' numbers were not listed by the SCB agency from 1988 to 1998 due to the party being out of contention for Riksdag entry.

Year	Turnout	Votes	V	S	MP	C	L	KD	M	SD	NyD	Left	Right
1973	92.2	7,945	7.3	61.6	0.0	15.7	7.3	0.9	7.6			68.9	30.6
1976	93.1	8,480	6.4	61.4	0.0	14.4	8.6	0.7	8.1			67.8	31.1
1979	91.9	8,755	8.0	62.1	0.0	9.0	8.3	0.6	11.5			70.1	28.8
1982	93.2	8,774	7.7	63.2	1.0	7.8	4.4	0.8	14.4			70.5	26.6
1985	91.6	8,610	7.8	61.4	1.2	4.9	10.5		13.8			69.2	29.2
1988	87.1	8,161	9.0	58.7	5.1	5.1	9.0	1.1	11.5			72.8	25.6
1991	87.8	8,183	6.4	54.6	2.5	3.8	6.4	3.9	13.0		8.7	61.0	27.1
1994	88.8	7,772	8.1	63.3	4.0	2.9	5.0	2.1	12.8		0.8	75.4	22.8
1998	83.2	6,891	14.8	55.2	3.7	2.1	2.9	7.7	12.1			73.7	24.8
2002	80.8	6,791	11.6	56.1	4.7	1.8	8.8	5.8	9.8	0.5		72.4	26.2
2006	81.9	6,944	8.1	50.7	4.7	3.4	5.7	4.6	18.5	2.3		63.5	32.2
2010	85.0	7,526	7.8	44.2	7.2	2.8	5.3	3.3	23.1	4.8		59.2	34.5
2014	86.0	7,597	8.0	44.1	5.2	2.7	3.4	2.8	17.1	14.0		57.3	26.0
2018	86.7	7,545	8.8	39.7	3.1	4.2	3.3	4.7	15.9	18.8		55.8	42.7

== Demographics ==
This is a demographic table based on Oxelösund Municipality's electoral districts in the 2022 Swedish general election sourced from SVT's election platform, in turn taken from SCB official statistics.

There is a strong income disparity between the four districts on the southern shore and the other three downtown districts. In comparison, the wealthier districts would all be among the upper-half earners in the more affluent Nyköping Municipality, while the lower three would be right near the bottom. In total there were 12,125 inhabitants with 9,072 Swedish citizens of voting age. The political demographics were 52.5% for the left bloc and 45.4% for the right bloc. Indicators are in percentage points except population totals and income.

Location	Residents	Citizen adults	Left vote	Right vote	Employed	Swedish parents	Foreign heritage	Income SEK	Degree
Location			%	%					
Dalgången	1,996	1,606	52.4	46.6	79	82	18	27,583	32
Danvik	1,502	1,158	47.6	50.9	87	88	12	30,029	44
Frösäng	1,376	1,085	54.5	42.7	74	64	36	20,332	21
Norra innerstaden	1,789	1,264	53.8	43.0	64	50	50	20,010	20
Peterslund	1,699	1,182	51.6	46.8	89	84	16	28,331	27
Sunda	1,675	1,307	53.9	44.9	87	84	16	27,186	33
Södra innerstaden	2,088	1,470	54.1	41.7	65	53	47	19,426	20
Source: SVT

== International relations ==
=== Twin towns - Sister cities ===
Oxelösund is a member of the Douzelage, a unique town twinning association of 24 towns across the European Union. This active town twinning began in 1991 and there are regular events, such as a produce market from each of the other countries and festivals. Discussions regarding membership are also in hand with three further towns (Agros in Cyprus, Škofja Loka in Slovenia, and Tryavna in Bulgaria).

Altea, Spain - 1991
Bad Kötzting, Germany - 1991
Bellagio, Italy - 1991
(Republic of Ireland) Bundoran, Ireland - 1991
Granville, France - 1991
Holstebro, Denmark - 1991
Houffalize, Belgium - 1991
Meerssen, the Netherlands - 1991
Niederanven, Luxembourg - 1991
Preveza, Greece - 1991
Sesimbra, Portugal - 1991
Sherborne, United Kingdom - 1991
Karkkila, Finland - 1997
Oxelösund, Sweden - 1998
Judenburg, Austria - 1999
Chojna, Poland - 2004
Kőszeg, Hungary - 2004
Sigulda, Latvia - 2004
Sušice, Czech Republic - 2004
Türi, Estonia - 2004
Zvolen, Slovakia - 2007
Prienai, Lithuania - 2008
Marsaskala, Malta - 2009
Siret, Romania - 2010
