= Oxelösund =

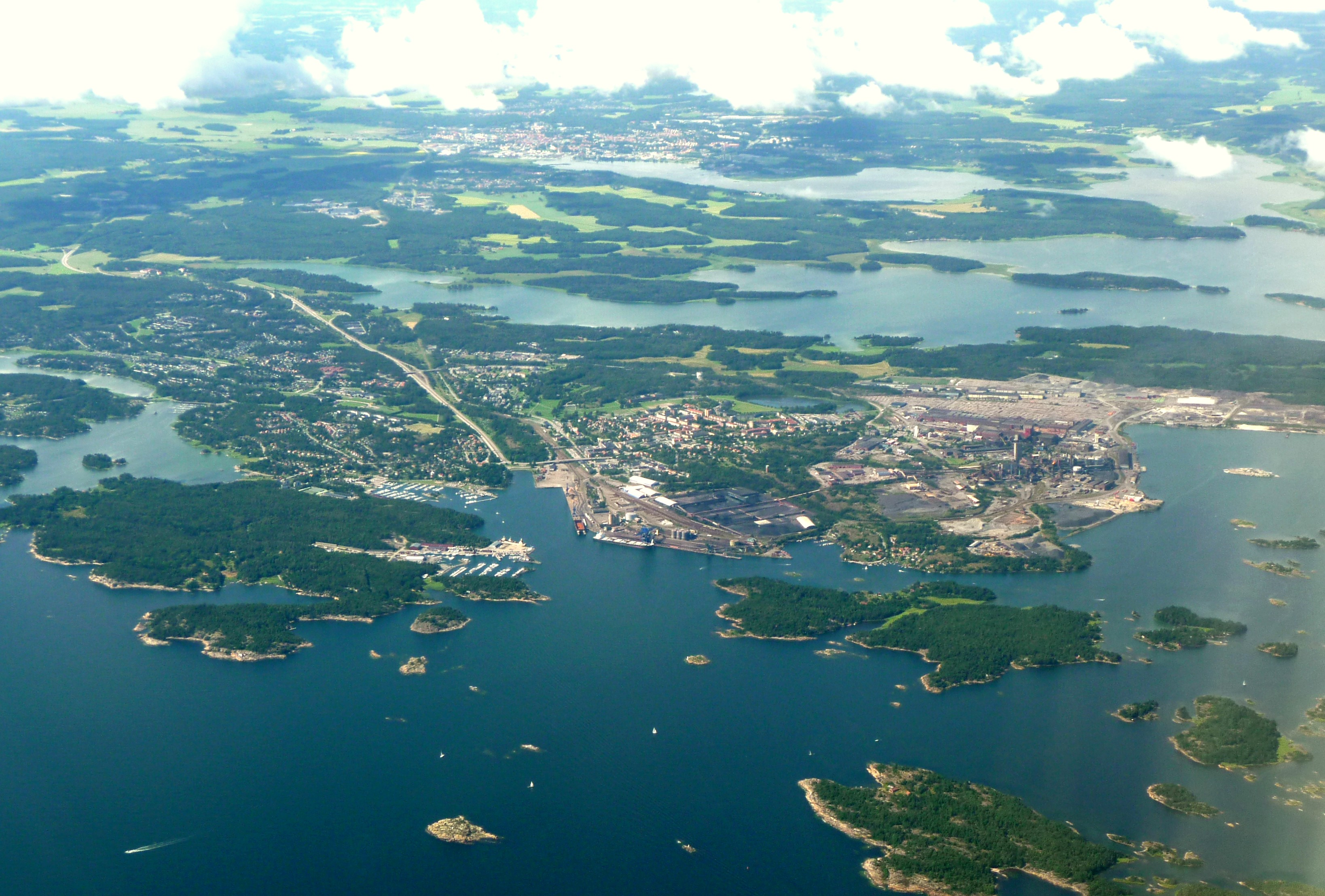
- 2012 aerial view of Oxelösund with Nyköping in the background

- Location within Södermanland Location within Sweden
- Coordinates: 58°40′N 17°07′E
- Country: Sweden
- Province: Södermanland
- County: Södermanland County
- Municipality: Oxelösund Municipality

Area
  - Total: 11.57 km^{2} (4.47 sq mi)

Population (31 December 2020)
  - Total: 11,420
  - Density: 987.0/km^{2} (2,556/sq mi)
- Time zone: UTC+1 (CET)
  - Summer (DST): UTC+2 (CEST)

Oxelösund is a locality and the seat of Oxelösund Municipality in Södermanland County, Sweden with 11,488 inhabitants in 2018. It is located less than 15 kilometres (9.3 mi) south from the city centre of its larger neighbour, Nyköping, with the two urban areas forming a wider agglomeration of nearly 50,000 people.

== History ==
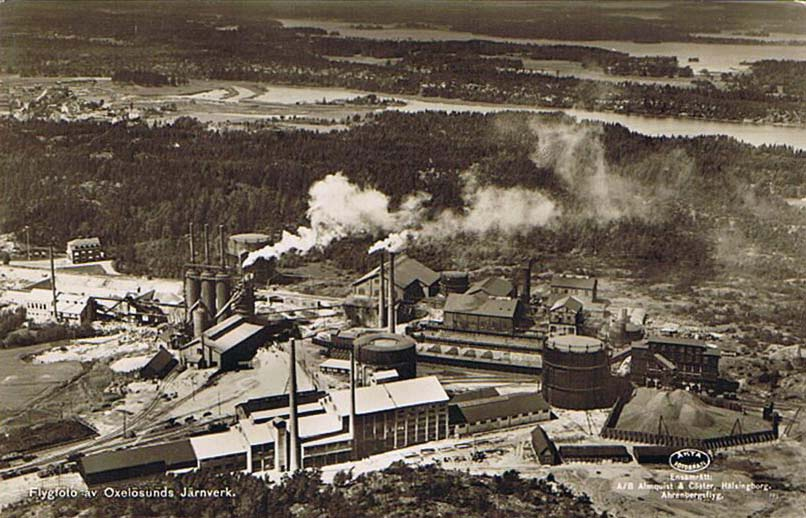
An early aerial photo of the Oxelösund ironworks showing its original size.

The harbour at Oxelösund has been used for at least 500 years. In the 19th century, an increased extraction from the mining district of Central Sweden (e.g. Bergslagen), made Oxelösund a harbour of transport. A local railroad company was established in 1873 and bought virtually the entire peninsula, which then belonged to the estates of the Stjärnholm Castle.

An iron works was constructed in 1913, and the community Oxelösund expanded, with the harbour, railway and iron works being its cornerstones.

In 1950, the city was sufficiently developed to get the title of a city and was one of the last towns to receive city status in Sweden. Since 1971, the status is obsolete, but Oxelösund is the seat of a municipality with the same territory that is one of the smallest in the country.

In November 2011, Oxelösund hosted the Nordic Under-21 Championships in underwater rugby.

Femöre battery is located near the area.

== Companies ==
- SSAB, Swedish steel.

== Climate ==
Oxelösund has a hybrid between a maritime and humid continental climate, with moderated patterns which stem from its position at the head of a peninsula, with the weather station facing the open sea. In much of the urban area and up the peninsula the climate is somewhat more prone to swings, something intensifying farther north as in Nyköping.

Climate data for Oxelösund (Femöre) 2002–2022 averages; extremes since 1961
Month	Jan	Feb	Mar	Apr	May	Jun	Jul	Aug	Sep	Oct	Nov	Dec	Year
Record high °C (°F)	12.1 (53.8)	14.6 (58.3)	19.4 (66.9)	23.1 (73.6)	28.2 (82.8)	31.3 (88.3)	31.5 (88.7)	35.0 (95.0)	25.0 (77.0)	20.6 (69.1)	16.6 (61.9)	13.3 (55.9)	35.0 (95.0)
Mean maximum °C (°F)	7.6 (45.7)	7.9 (46.2)	13.7 (56.7)	17.6 (63.7)	22.6 (72.7)	26.4 (79.5)	28.1 (82.6)	26.6 (79.9)	22.3 (72.1)	16.3 (61.3)	11.9 (53.4)	8.2 (46.8)	28.9 (84.0)
Mean daily maximum °C (°F)	1.7 (35.1)	2.1 (35.8)	5.7 (42.3)	10.4 (50.7)	15.2 (59.4)	20.0 (68.0)	22.6 (72.7)	21.6 (70.9)	17.3 (63.1)	11.1 (52.0)	6.4 (43.5)	3.2 (37.8)	11.4 (52.6)
Daily mean °C (°F)	−0.6 (30.9)	−0.4 (31.3)	2.3 (36.1)	6.4 (43.5)	11.3 (52.3)	16.0 (60.8)	18.7 (65.7)	17.9 (64.2)	13.8 (56.8)	8.4 (47.1)	4.3 (39.7)	1.1 (34.0)	8.3 (46.9)
Mean daily minimum °C (°F)	−2.8 (27.0)	−2.9 (26.8)	−1.1 (30.0)	2.4 (36.3)	7.3 (45.1)	12.1 (53.8)	14.8 (58.6)	14.2 (57.6)	10.3 (50.5)	5.6 (42.1)	2.2 (36.0)	−1.1 (30.0)	5.1 (41.2)
Mean minimum °C (°F)	−12.2 (10.0)	−11.8 (10.8)	−7.9 (17.8)	−2.5 (27.5)	1.9 (35.4)	7.1 (44.8)	10.9 (51.6)	9.1 (48.4)	4.2 (39.6)	−1.5 (29.3)	−5.1 (22.8)	−9.4 (15.1)	−14.8 (5.4)
Record low °C (°F)	−25.1 (−13.2)	−27.1 (−16.8)	−18.8 (−1.8)	−9.0 (15.8)	−4.7 (23.5)	−0.2 (31.6)	4.9 (40.8)	5.2 (41.4)	−0.9 (30.4)	−6.9 (19.6)	−14.7 (5.5)	−20.8 (−5.4)	−27.1 (−16.8)
Average precipitation mm (inches)	36.8 (1.45)	27.9 (1.10)	25.8 (1.02)	24.4 (0.96)	41.9 (1.65)	53.9 (2.12)	55.3 (2.18)	68.9 (2.71)	39.4 (1.55)	56.1 (2.21)	50.7 (2.00)	44.3 (1.74)	525.4 (20.69)
Source 1: SMHI
Source 2: SMHI Open Data
