= Aron Anderson =

Swedish adventurer, motivational speaker and athlete

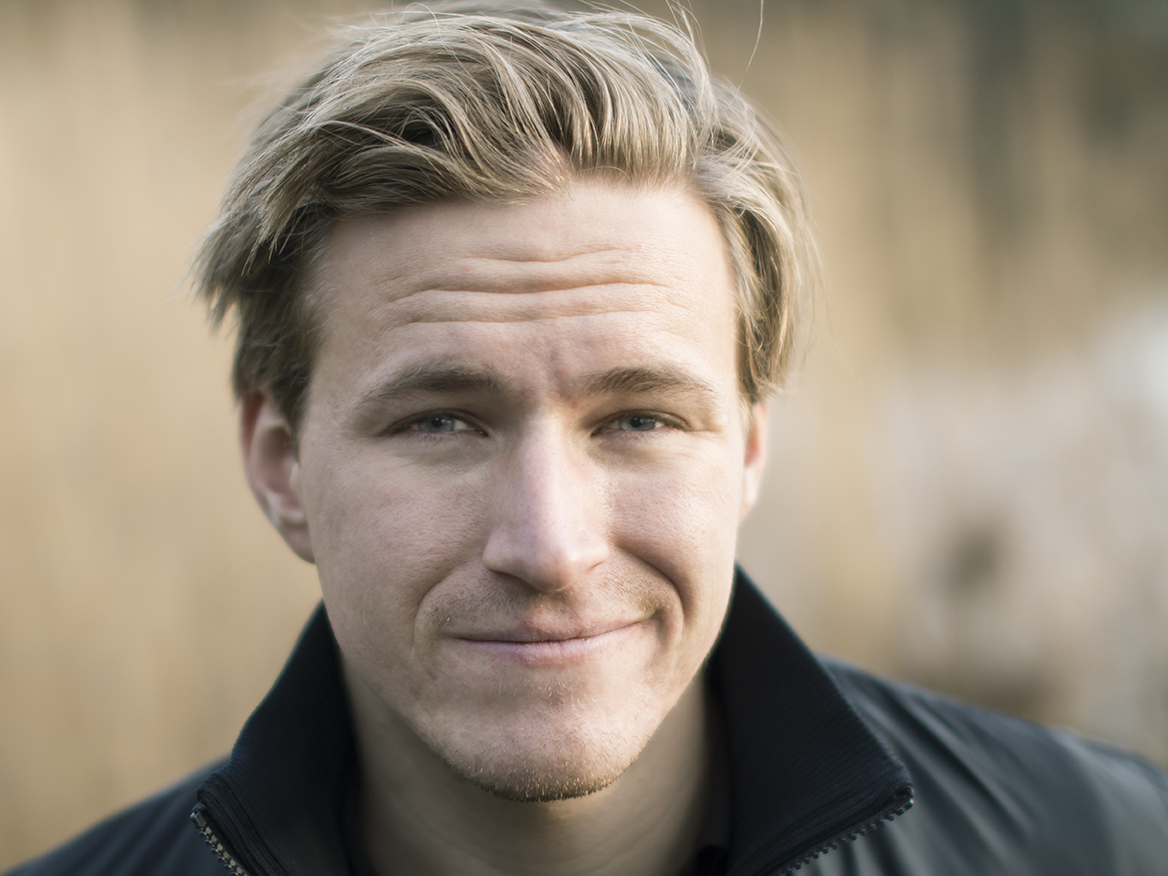
- Anderson in 2014
- Born: Aron Karl Riggert Anderson; January 26, 1988 (age 38); Stockholm, Sweden
- Occupations: Athlete, motivational speaker, adventurer

Aron Karl Riggert Anderson (born 26 January 1988) is a Swedish adventurer, motivational speaker and a paralympian-athlete. Anderson was the first wheelchair user to summit Sweden's highest mountain, Kebnekaise, and Mount Kilimanjaro in Tanzania.

== Biography ==
In January 1996, Anderson and his parents were told by doctors he had cancer in his lower back. He was treated with chemotherapy and radiation throughout 1996 and early 1997. The treatments did not work, and in late 1997 the cancer was removed surgically, at which time Anderson lost function in both legs.

He competes as a celebrity dancer in Let's Dance 2022, which is broadcast by TV4. He is also the first dancer to use a wheelchair on the show.

=== Athletics ===
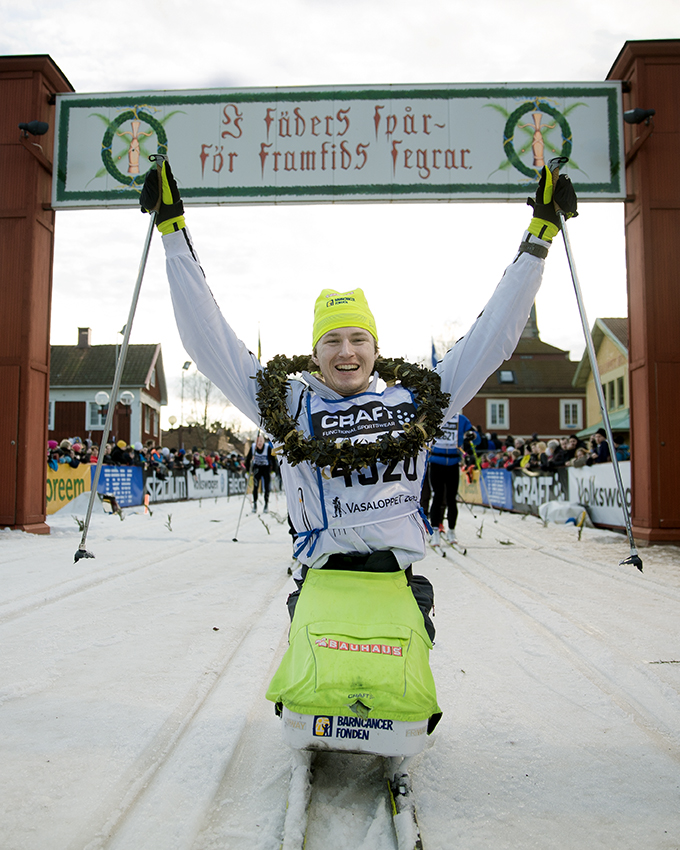
Aron Anderson at Vasaloppet in 2015

Aron Anderson became a para-athlete in three different sports, sailing, athletics and sledge-hockey and has participated in four Paralympic Games. Between 1999 and 2005, he competed in sailing, he stopped competing after the 2004 Paralympics in Athens, Greece. He instead started fully competing in athletics and sledge-hockey.

In 2012, he was forced to stop competing in athletics as he had to undergo a hip operation which made it impossible for him to compete at elite level. He also stopped playing sledge-hockey after the World Championships in 2013, to set his mind on only adventures and lecturing.

=== Adventuring ===
On 1 August 2013, he was the first wheelchair user to climb to the top of Kebnekaise, Sweden's highest mountain, using crutches and "crawling" with his arms. He is also the first person in a wheelchair to have climbed to the peak of Mount Kilimanjaro. The expedition was led by adventurer Johan Ernst Nilson. He reached the peak at 15.00 (CET) on 1 August 2013. In 2014, he decided to complete a Swedish Classic, in which he competed in and finished the long-distance endurance events of Vasaloppet, Vätternrundan, Vansbrosimmet and the Lidingöloppet during one year, this also as the first wheelchair user. On 7 August 2015, he swam in 14 degree water for 37 kilometers over the sea of Åland between Grissleham to Åland, a swim that took him 13 hours to complete. In 2019, Anderson competed in the competition show Vinnarskallar which was broadcast on TV4, where he competed against other Swedish para-athletes. He won the show. He has also skied through Antarctica, a monthlong journey and the first person in a wheelchair to do it. In December 2018, Anderson joined with singer Peg Parnevik to be ambassadors for Musikhjälpen which was broadcast on SVT and on radio for Sveriges Radio.

Anderson works as a motivational speaker. He is also an ambassador for Barncancerfonden, a children's cancer foundation, and has through his adventures also helped to raise money for the cause. In 2017, Anderson presented an episode of the radio show Sommar i P1, speaking about his struggles and successes in life.
