= Sport in Sweden =

Sporting activity in Sweden

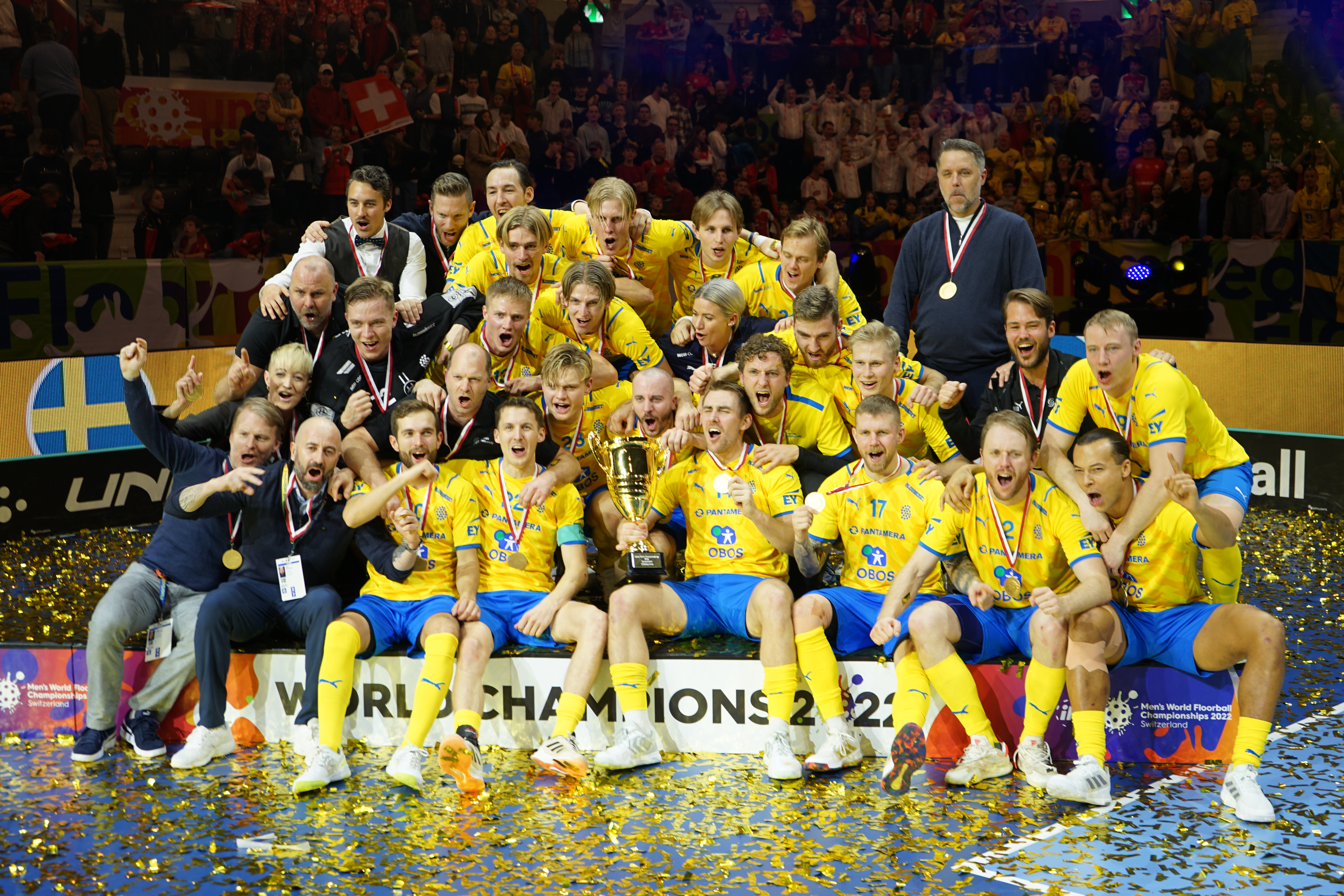
Swedish national team celebrating 2022 IFF Floorball Championship

Sport is considered a national pastime in Sweden, and about half of the population actively takes part in sports activities. The most important all-embracing organisations for sports in Sweden are the Swedish Sports Confederation, and the Swedish Olympic Committee. In total over 2 million people (about 20% of the total population) are members of a sports club.

The sports with most participants are football, floorball, equestrian sports, handball, golf, gymnastics and athletics, while the sports with the largest number of television spectators are football, ice hockey, handball, bandy, golf, motor sport (especially speedway and Formula 1) and athletics. Ice hockey and football are the main sports. Winter sports are also popular, both in the number of participants and in spectators, while floorball gained popularity in the 1990s amongst participants, spectators grew in the last five years to outnumber other team sports amongst the spectators. Other popular sports include bandy, basketball, orienteering, tennis and table tennis.

Popular recreational sports and activities include brännboll (popular in schools), boule, kubb, skiing, swimming, gymnastics, walking, running, cycling, dancing, and hunting.

Sweden was considered in 2017 to be the fifth best per capita country in the world and world-leading in two sports, bandy and orienteering.

== History ==
The Swedish sport movement can be traced back to the early 19th century and the Pehr Henrik Ling gymnastics, a recreational movement that would keep its position as the largest fitness activity in Sweden many years into the 20th century. It was also the main sport activity practiced in schools through half that century. The sport movement took its first steps in the 1880s and 1890s, when for example football, bandy and athletics took its first steps in Sweden towards becoming modern sports.

The first public orienteering competition in Sweden was held in 1981 (see history of orienteering). Today, orienteering is one of the most popular sports in Sweden, attracting more than 100,000 runners.

== Prominent athletes, teams and competitions ==
For an average sized nation, Sweden has top results in many different sports.

=== Football ===
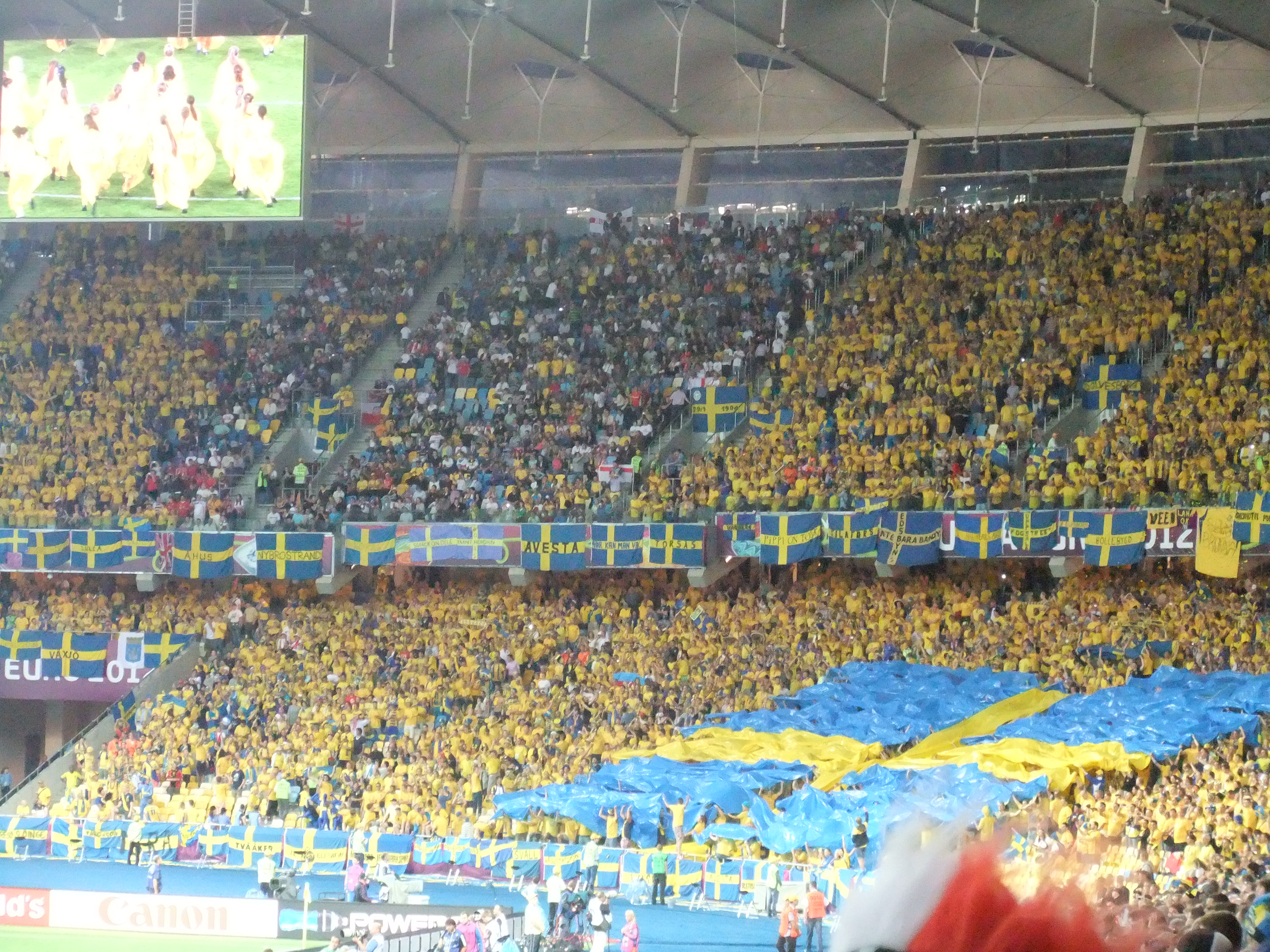
Swedish football supporters at the UEFA Euro 2012 in Ukraine

Some internationally acclaimed football players as of 2020 from Sweden include Emil Forsberg, Zlatan Ibrahimović, Victor Lindelöf, Viktor Gyökeres and Alexander Isak. Historically acclaimed football stars include the trio of players known as Gre-No-Li, who still enjoy legendary status for Italy's Milan. Gre-No-Li were the 1950s football players called Gunnar Gren, Gunnar Nordahl, and Nils Liedholm. Other previously active footballs stars include Henrik Larsson, Glenn Strömberg and Freddie Ljungberg.

The Sweden men's national football team has seen some success at the FIFA World Cup, finishing second when they hosted the tournament in 1958, and third twice, in 1950 and 1994. Their best showing in the UEFA European Championship came as Sweden hosted Euro 1992. They reached the semi-finals. Something Swedes are proud of is that England did not defeat Sweden from 1968 until 2011. Revered in Italy and England is Sven-Göran Eriksson, the Swede who led the England national team until his resignation after the 2006 World Cup. They also hosted the UEFA European Under-21 Championship in 2009, losing out in the semi-finals on penalties against England. Only one Swedish club has won a major UEFA competition – IFK Göteborg – who won the UEFA Cup in 1982 and 1987. In 1979, Malmö FF reached the final of the 1978–79 European Cup (now known as the UEFA Champions League), but they lost 1–0 to Nottingham Forest in Munich.

=== Ice hockey ===
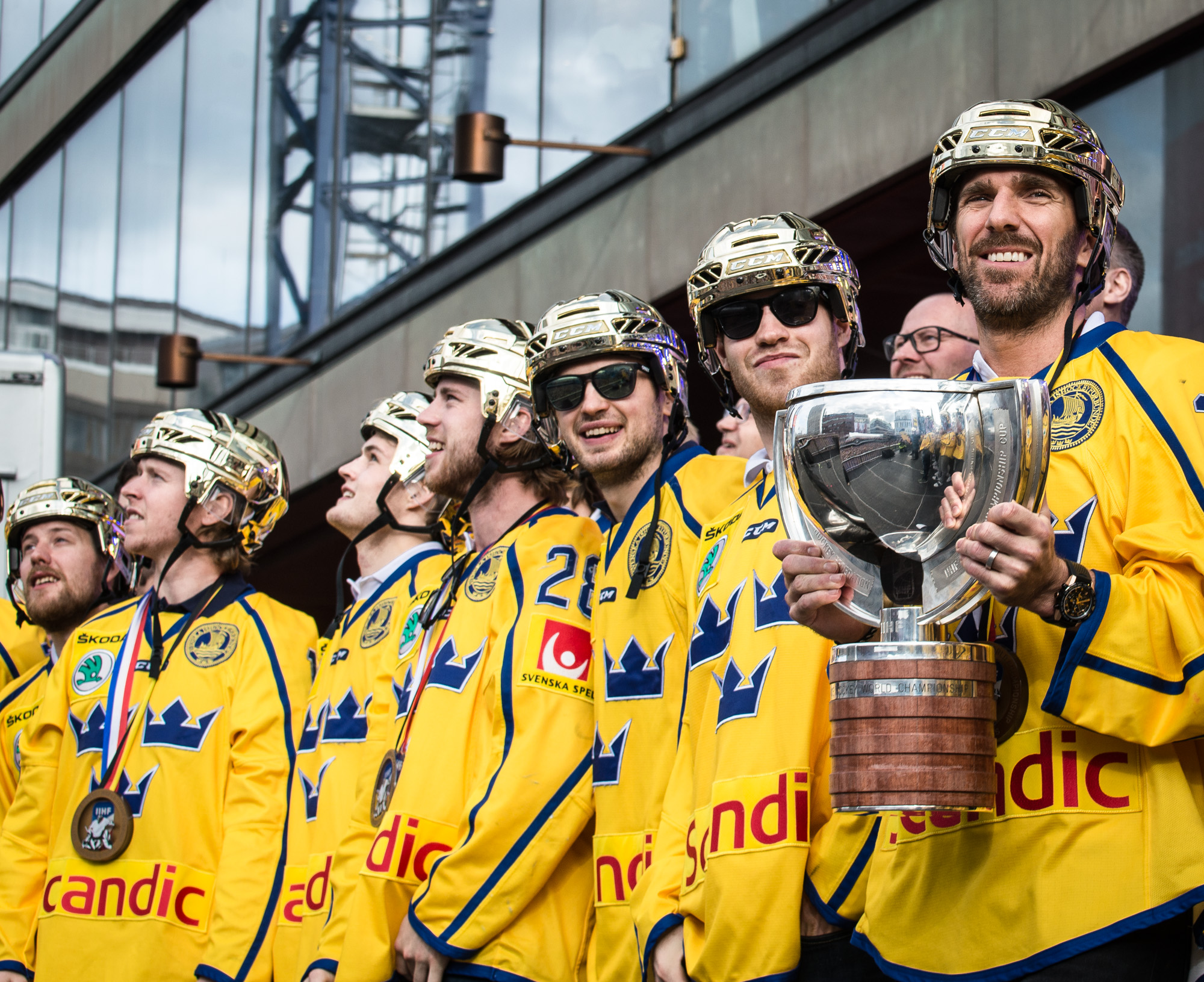
The Swedish men's team celebrated after the 2017 IIHF World Championship gold.

The men's national hockey team has won the World Championships eleven times, the eleventh time was in 2018, and Olympic gold medals in 1994 and 2006. The women's national hockey team won bronze medals in the 2002 Winter Olympics and the 2005 Women's World Ice Hockey Championships, and a silver medal in the 2006 Winter Olympics. Famous Swedish NHL hockey players include Peter Forsberg, Mats Sundin, Nicklas Lidström, Markus Näslund, Daniel Alfredsson, Henrik Sedin, Daniel Sedin, Börje Salming, Henrik Zetterberg, Nicklas Bäckström, Henrik Lundqvist, Johan Franzen, Niklas Kronwall, Patrik Berglund, Thomas Steen, Bengt-Åke Gustafsson, Håkan Loob, Mats Näslund, Kent Nilsson, Erik Karlsson and Pelle Lindbergh.

The Swedish Hockey League was founded in 1975. Counting from 1922, when the first Swedish championships were played, Djurgårdens IF is the most successful team with 16 championship titles, followed by Brynäs IF with 13, then as Färjestad BK and IK Göta with 9.

=== Bandy ===
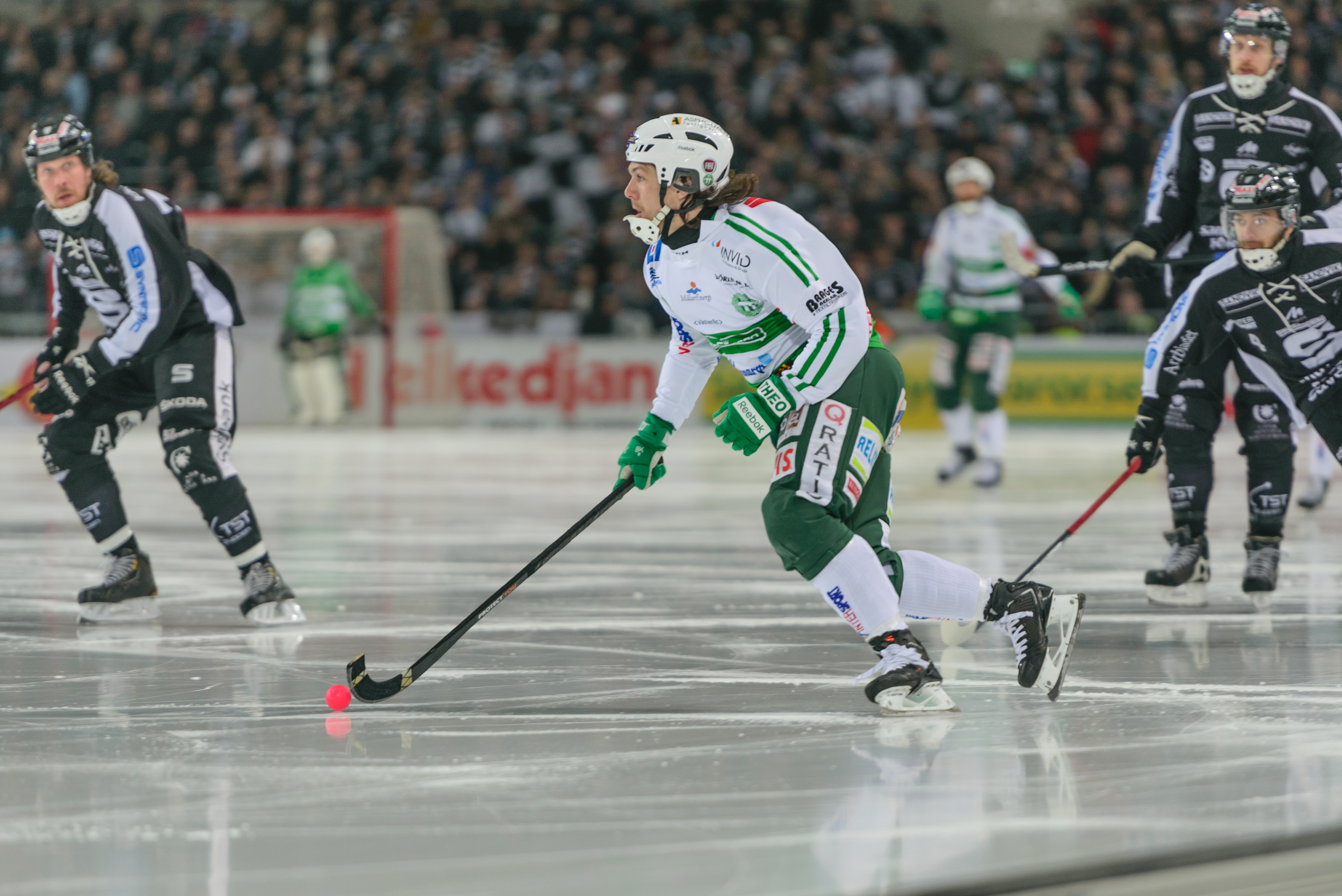
The 2015 national bandy championship final

Bandy has a special status in Sweden, enjoying almost a cult following by some of its supporters. The annual national bandy championship final is a traditional event followed not only by the usual bandy fans. Sweden is one of the leading bandy playing nations, having won the Bandy World Championship a number of times and the Women's Bandy World Championship every time except one. It is also a big coach exporter. As of 2018 the national teams of China, Slovakia, the Netherlands, Somalia and Ukraine all have Swedish leaders involved. There are more indoor venues than in all other countries combined. Bandy is a game belonging to the hockey family and played with a small ball and short curved sticks. In terms of licensed athletes, it is the second biggest winter sport in the world.

=== Skiing ===
In skiing sports, Ingemar Stenmark, Pernilla Wiberg and Anja Pärson have all dominated alpine skiing at some point, and so have Sixten Jernberg, Gunde Svan and Thomas Wassberg in cross-country skiing. In ski jumping, Jan Boklöv revolutionised the sport with his new V-style technique. In biathlon Magdalena Forsberg was the dominant female athlete in the late 1990s and early 2000s, while subsequently Helena Ekholm and Hanna and Elvira Öberg have been among the top competitors in women's biathlon.

=== Handball ===
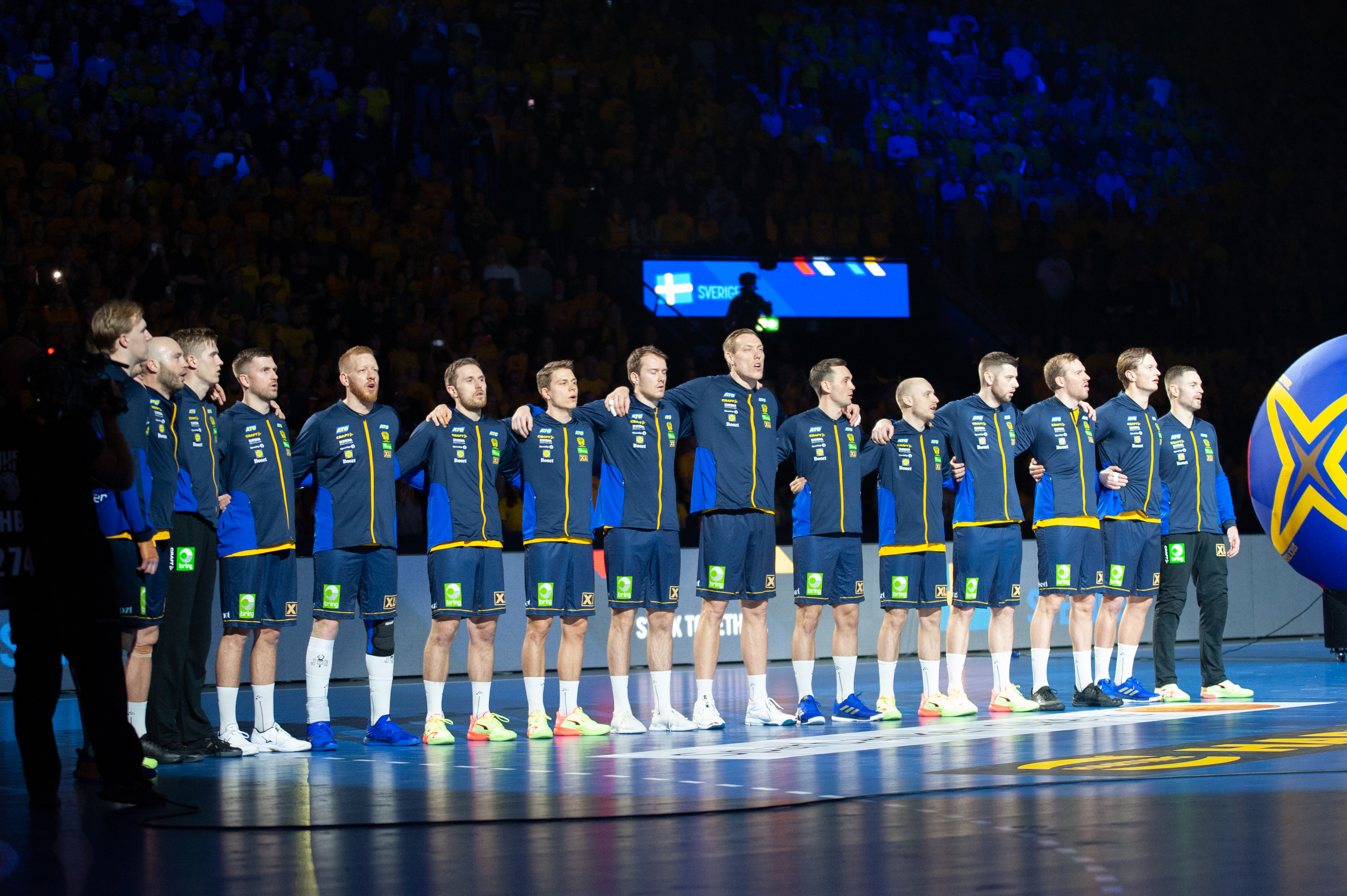
Swedish national team in 2023 World Men's Handball Championship

Sweden have won four world championships (WC) (1954, 1958, 1990, 1999) and hold, along with Romania and France, the record number of titles. They have also won three WC silver (1964, 1997, 2001), four WC bronze (1938, 1961, 1993, 1995), five European championship gold (1994, 1998, 2000, 2002, 2022) and four Olympic silver medals (1992, 1996, 2000, 2012). The Swedish National Handball team is considered to be the most successful in the history of the sport. Famous Swedish handball players include: Magnus Wislander, Stefan Lövgren, Staffan Olsson, Peter Gentzel, Ola Lindgren, Tomas Svensson, Kim Andersson, Magnus Andersson, Mattias Andersson, Marcus Ahlm, Jonas Källman, Kim Ekdahl Du Rietz and Magnus Jernemyr.

=== Motorsports ===
Three Swedish Formula One drivers have collected wins: Ronnie Peterson, Jo Bonnier and Gunnar Nilsson. Peterson scored ten wins and was runner-up in the F1 World Championship in the 1971 and 1978 seasons.

In rallying, Björn Waldegård won the World Rally Championship in 1979, the Safari Rally in 1977, 1984, 1986, 1990, the Monte Carlo Rally in 1969 and 1970, as well as the British RAC Rally in 1977. Stig Blomqvist won the 1984 WRC. Also, Erik Carlsson won the Monte Carlo Rally in 1962 and 1963.

Other notable drivers are: two time DTM (Deutsche Tourenwagen Masters) and Race of Champions winner Mattias Ekström, multiple Speedway World Champion Tony Rickardsson; World Touring Car Champion Thed Björk, British Touring Car Champion Rickard Rydell, IRL champion and Indianapolis 500 winner Kenny Bräck, and Indianapolis 500 winners Marcus Ericsson and Felix Rosenqvist.

The Swedish Rally, first held in 1950, is part of the World Rally Championship since 1973. Meanwhile, the Anderstorp Raceway hosted the Formula One Swedish Grand Prix from 1973 to 1978, the Swedish motorcycle Grand Prix from 1971 to 1977 and 1981–1990, the European Touring Car Championship from 1985 to 1987, the Superbike World Championship in 1991 and 1993, the FIA GT Championship in 2002 and 2003, and the World Touring Car Championship in 2007.

The Swedish Touring Car Championship and Scandinavian Touring Car Championship were held from 1996 to 2024.

The Höljesbanan rallycross track opened in 1976 and hosts an annual round of the FIA European Rallycross Championship. Notable drivers include Per Eklund, Kenneth Hansen, Kevin Hansen, Timmy Hansen, Michael Jernberg, Johan Kristoffersson, Lars Larsson, Robin Larsson, Anton Marklund and Mattias Ekström.

=== Basketball ===
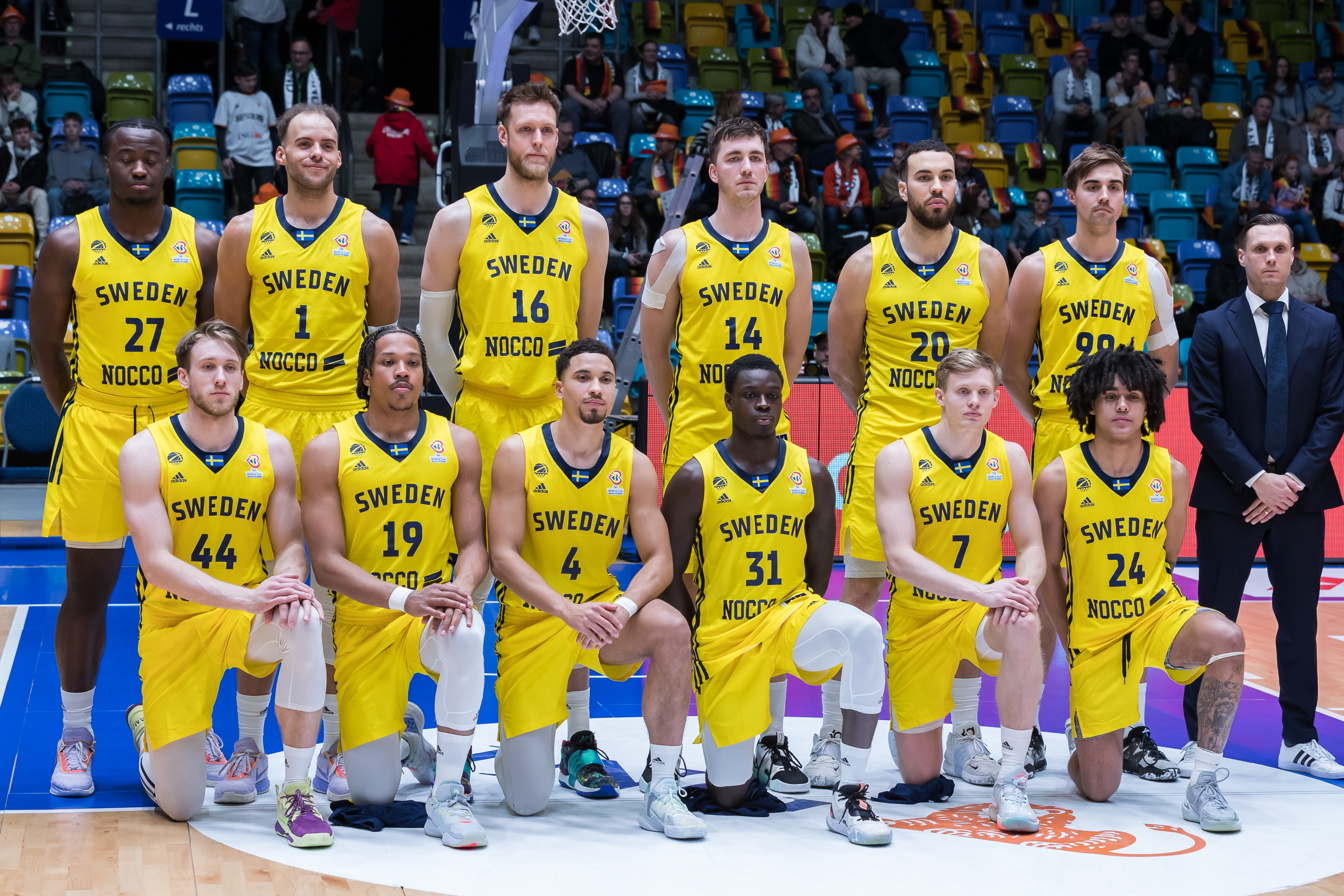
Swedish national basketball team in 2023

Basketball has gained attention in Sweden through a series of internationally significant events. In 1999, Earvin "Magic" Johnson, one of the best basketball players in world history, bought the club M7 Borås and played several games there.

Later, several Swedish basketball teams competed at international tournaments.

Ten years after Magic Johnson's first games in Sweden, Jonas Jerebko became the first person born and raised in Sweden to play in the NBA. In 2012, Jeffery Taylor, the second Swedish player, followed. They both represented Sweden at the 2013 EuroBasket and secured a surprising victory against former champion Russia. Yet, they were not enough to help their country proceed from the preliminary round.

Both Jerebko and Taylor are sons of American basketball players who settled in Sweden after finishing their professional careers in the country, and Taylor left Sweden at age 17 to play both high school and college basketball in the U.S. Jerebko has played ten seasons in the NBA, first with the Detroit Pistons (2009–2015), Boston Celtics (2015–2017), Utah Jazz (2017–2018), and Golden State Warriors (2018–2019), where he made the 2019 NBA Finals with an injured Warriors team, but were defeated by the Toronto Raptors in six games. On August 14, 2019, Jerebko then signed with Khimki of the VTB United League and the EuroLeague. But on January 23, 2021, Khimki terminated the contract of Jerebko. Taylor played three seasons with the Charlotte Hornets (2012–2015) before returning to Europe and signing with Real Madrid. In May 2018, Real Madrid won the 2017–18 EuroLeague championship, after defeating Fenerbahçe Doğuş in the final game with 85–80. Over 34 EuroLeague games, Taylor averaged 5.9 points, 1.9 rebounds and 1.2 assists per game.

=== Track and field ===
A number of Swedes have been internationally successful in track and field. In the 1940s runners Gunder Hägg, Arne Andersson, and Lennart Strand dominated middle-distance running. In recent years, stars include high jumpers such as World Champion and European record holder Patrik Sjöberg, Olympic gold medalist Ludmila Engquist, World Champion and Olympic medallist Kajsa Bergqvist, Athens Olympic gold medallist Stefan Holm, and Tokyo Olympic champion and World Championship medallist Armand Duplantis. Two other Swedish athletes won gold medals in the 2004 Olympic Games: heptathlete Carolina Klüft and triple jumper Christian Olsson. Susanna Kallur is the World record holder for the indoor 60m hurdles set in 2008.

=== Electronic sports ===
Electronic sports are also gaining momentum in Sweden since the launch of StarCraft II with Swedish national televisions covering Dreamhack events throughout the year. Notable names are Jonathan "Jinro" Walsh for his performances South Korea, and Marcus "Thorzain" Eklöf and Johan "NaNiwa" Lucchesi for being two of the top non-Korean players during 2011–2013.

Swedish players have also been successful in other competitive video games. The Alliance won The International for Dota 2 in 2013, winning ~$1.4 million USD. Sweden was the highest ranking country in terms of results and prize money won in Counter-Strike. Emil "HeatoN" Christensen and Patrik "f0rest" Lindberg were two of the foremost players in the history of the game, both of whom later became involved in the Counter-Strike: Global Offensive team "Ninjas in Pyjamas".

=== Golf ===
Sweden has nearly half a million active golfers and Swedish golf players have won over 100 European Tour and 25 PGA Tour events. Nine have been selected to the European team at the Ryder Cup: Joakim Haeggman, Per-Ulrik Johansson, Jesper Parnevik, Robert Karlsson, Jarmo Sandelin, Pierre Fulke, Niclas Fasth, Peter Hanson and Henrik Stenson. Karlsson and Stenson (twice) have won the European Tour Order of Merit/Race to Dubai. Stenson rose to second on the world ranking after winning the PGA Tour's championship trophy the FedEx Cup in 2013. Fasth and Parnevik (twice) have been runner-up in the British Open, which Stenson won in record-breaking fashion in 2016, shortly before securing an Olympic silver medal.

Annika Sörenstam is a World Golf Hall of Fame member and dominated her sport 1995–2005, with ten major tournament wins and 72 LPGA Tour wins. In addition to Sörenstam, Liselotte Neumann, Helen Alfredsson and Sophie Gustafson (four times) have won the Ladies European Tour Order of Merit. Other notable female players are Anna Nordqvist, Maria Hjorth, Carin Koch and Catrin Nilsmark.

The Scandinavian Masters is part of the European Tour since 1991. Previously, the circuit sanctioned the Scandinavian Enterprise Open held from 1973 to 1990 and the PLM Open from 1986 to 1990. Meanwhile, the Scandinavian TPC hosted by Annika was part of the Ladies European Tour from 1996 to 2008. The country hosted other LET events, as well as the 2003 and 2007 Solheim Cup.

=== Orienteering ===
Sweden is the most successful orienteering country in history.

=== Others ===
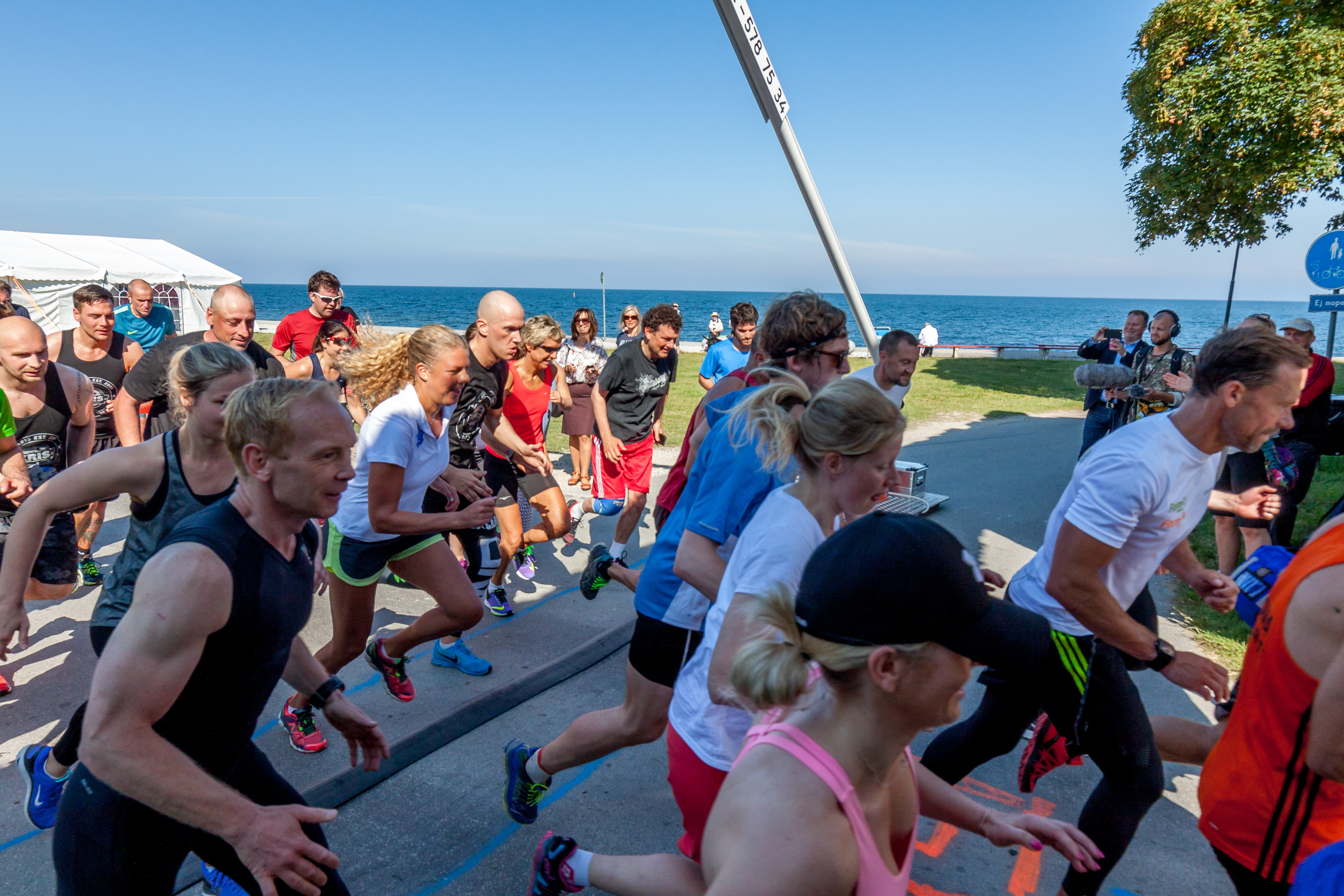
Säpojoggen jogging event in Visby, Gotland

Known tennis players include three former World No. 1's in singles, Björn Borg (eleven Grand Slam titles), Mats Wilander (seven) and Stefan Edberg (six), as well as two former World No. 1's in doubles Jonas Björkman (nine) and Anders Järryd (eight).

Other famous Swedish athletes include the heavyweight boxing champion and International Boxing Hall of Famer - Ingemar Johansson; Olympic gold medal-winning fencer Johan Harmenberg; and multiple World Championships and Olympics medalist in table tennis - Jan-Ove Waldner. Other popular Swedish table tennis players include Mattias Falck, Jörgen Persson and Truls Möregårdh.

Arne Borg, Gunnar Larsson, Anders Holmertz, Stefan Nystrand, Therese Alshammar, Anna-Karin Kammerling, Emma Igelström, Lars Frölander and Sarah Sjöström are some of the renowned swimmers, who have been successful in Olympics and/or World Championships.

Sweden has also been internationally successful in equestrian (Malin Baryard, Rolf-Göran Bengtsson) and speed-skating (Tomas Gustafson).

In cycling Sweden has the 1971 Giro winner Gösta Pettersson, two-time Giro runner up Tommy Prim, 1982 Vuelta podium finisher Sven-Åke Nilsson, 2004 Paris–Roubaix winner Magnus Bäckstedt and 1976 Olympic road race champion Bernt Johansson as well as several other top professional cyclists including current riders Emma Johansson, Thomas Lövkvist, Gustav Larsson, Fredrik Kessiakoff and Emilia Fahlin.

Another sport growing in interest in Sweden is mixed martial arts. Arguably the most famous fighter out of Sweden is Alexander Gustafsson, who is widely considered as one of the greatest fighters who has never won an undisputed championship in the Ultimate Fighting Championship. He has headlined five UFC events in Sweden.

For the first time, Sweden will feature a national team at the 2022 Under-19 World Lacrosse Championships.

== Spectator sports ==
The greatest spectator sports in Sweden are football (Allsvenskan) and ice hockey (Swedish Hockey League). Handball and floorball come close, together with regional specialties such as bandy and speedway. There are a dozen indoor arenas for bandy.

== International championships hosted by Sweden ==
Year	Championship	Venue(es)
1912	Summer Olympics	Stockholm
1934	Nordic World Ski Championships	Sollefteå
1949	World Ice Hockey Championships	Stockholm
1954	World Handball Championship	?
1954	World Ice Hockey Championships	Stockholm
1954	Nordic World Ski Championships	Falun
1956	Equestrian at the 1956 Summer Olympics	Stockholm
1958	European Athletics Championships	Stockholm
1958	Football World Cup	Borås, Eskilstuna, Gothenburg, Halmstad, Helsingborg, Malmö, Norrköping, Sandviken, Stockholm, Uddevalla, Västerås, Örebro
1961	Biathlon World Championships	Umeå
1963	World Ice Hockey Championships	Stockholm
1967	World Handball Championship	?
1969	World Ice Hockey Championships	Stockholm
1970	World Ice Hockey Championships	Stockholm
1970	Biathlon World Championships	Östersund
1974	European Athletics Indoor Championships	Gothenburg
1974	Nordic World Ski Championships	Falun
1976	Winter Paralympic Games	Örnsköldsvik
1977	1977 World Wrestling Championships	Gothenburg
1980	Nordic World Ski Championships	Falun
1981	World Ice Hockey Championships	Gothenburg, Stockholm
1984	European Athletics Indoor Championships	Gothenburg
1986	Biathlon World Championships	Falun
1989	World Ice Hockey Championships	Stockholm, Södertälje
1989	European Volleyball Championship	Stockholm, Örebro
1992	European Football Championship	Gothenburg, Malmö, Norrköping, Stockholm
1993	World Handball Championship	Gothenburg, Halmstad, Stockholm, Uddevalla
1993	Nordic World Ski Championships	Falun
1995	World Championships in Athletics	Gothenburg
1995	Women's Football World Cup	Gävle, Helsingborg, Karlstad, Stockholm, Västerås
1996	European Athletics Indoor Championships	Stockholm
2002	Ice Hockey World Championship	Gothenburg, Jönköping, Karlstad
2003	European Basketball Championship	Borås, Luleå, Norrköping, Stockholm, Södertälje
2006	European Athletics Championships	Gothenburg
2008	Biathlon World Championships	Östersund
2009	European Under-21 Football Championship	Gothenburg, Halmstad, Helsingborg, Malmö
2011	World Handball Championship	Gothenburg, Jönköping, Kristianstad, Linköping, Lund, Malmö, Norrköping, Skövde
2012	Ice Hockey World Championship	Stockholm (along with Helsinki, Finland)
2013	European Athletics Indoor Championships	Gothenburg
2013	Ice Hockey World Championship	Stockholm (along with Helsinki, Finland)
2013	Women's European Football Championship	Gothenburg, Halmstad, Kalmar, Linköping, Norrköping, Stockholm, Växjö
2015	2015 Women's Ice Hockey World Championships	Malmö
2015	Nordic World Ski Championships	Falun
2019	Biathlon World Championships	Östersund

== Events ==
- Open to everyone
  - Gothia Cup (football)
  - Göteborgsvarvet (running)
  - Lidingöloppet (running)
  - O-Ringen (orienteering)
  - Stockholm Marathon
  - Vansbrosimningen (swimming)
  - Vasaloppet (cross-country skiing)
  - Vätternrundan (bicycle racing)
- Open to elite only
  - Swedish Open (tennis)
  - DN Galan (track and field)
  - Sweden Hockey Games (ice hockey)
  - Bandy World Cup
- Elite leagues
  - Allsvenskan (association football)
  - Swedish Hockey League (ice hockey)
  - Elitserien (bandy)
  - Swedish Basketball League (basketball)

== See also ==
- Indoor venues in Sweden
- Swedish champions
