= Isac Heens =

Swedish ice hockey player (born 2000)

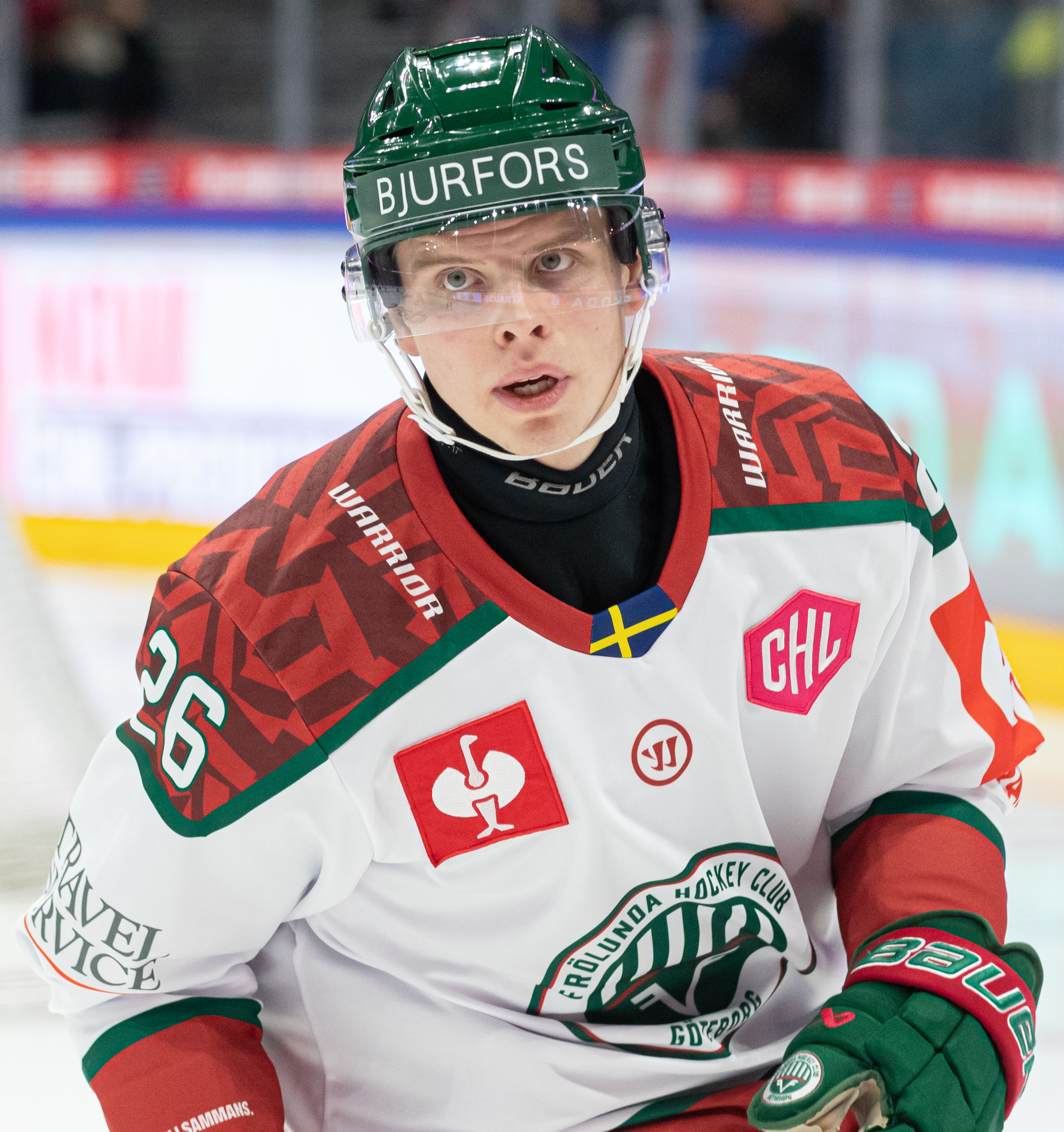
- Heens in 2025
- Born: 9 October 1999 (age 26) Vansbro, Sweden
- Height: 6 ft 0 in (183 cm)
- Weight: 176 lb (80 kg; 12 st 8 lb)
- Position: Defence
- Shoots: Left
- SHL team: Frölunda HC
- Playing career: 2018–present

Isac Heens (born October 9, 1999) is a Swedish professional ice hockey defenceman for Frölunda HC of the Swedish Hockey League (SHL).

== Playing career ==
Heens started skating at age four and played youth hockey for his hometown team Vansbro AIK Heens was not selected to play in TV-pucken nor did he get accepted to any hockey gymnasium, which is the most common path to a professional ice hockey career in Sweden. At age fifteen he started playing junior and senior ice hockey for neighboring town's Malungs IF in Swedish fifth tier league Division 3. Heens played winger in youth hockey but converted to defenceman after being convinced by his coach Ulf Skoglund while playing for Malungs IF. Malungs IF were promoted to Division 2 for the 2015–16 season. During his fourth season with Malung Heens helped them earn promotion to Hockeyettan, scoring two goals and five assist in thirteen games during the qualification playoffs. Heens' coach and mentor Skoglund helped Heens get a contract for the 2018–19 season with Södertälje SK in Sweden's top junior league; the J20 SuperElit. Heens excelled at the junior level, having played four years against men prior, leading all defencemen in points for Södertälje, with two goals and 23 assist in 42 games. During the season Heens was called up to play seven games for Södertälje in Sweden's second tier men's ice hockey league, the HockeyAllsvenskan. For the 2019–20 season Heens signed a one-year contract with AIK IF in HockeyAllsvenskan for the 2019–20 season, scoring one goal and eight assist in his first full season in HockeyAllsvenskan. For the 2020–21 season Heens signed with Mora IK in HockeyAllsvenskan, close to his hometown of Vansbro. In his first season with Mora Heens scored five goals and eight assist in 45 games. In total, Heens played three seasons with Mora before signing a two-year contract with Frölunda HC in top tier Swedish Hockey League (SHL) for the 2023–24 season. He scored his first career SHL goal, the game-tying goal, on October 14, 2023, when he helped Frölunda overcome a 0–4 deficit to defeat HV71 by a score of 6–4.

== Personal life ==
Isac's younger brother Simon plays ice hockey for his hometown team Vansbro AIK in Swedish fifth tier league Division 3.

== Career statistics ==
			Regular season					Playoffs
Season	Team	League	GP	G	A	Pts	PIM	GP	G	A	Pts	PIM
2018–19	Södertälje SK	J20	42	2	23	25	12	5	1	3	4	2
2018–19	Södertälje SK	Allsv	7	0	0	0	0	—	—	—	—	—
2019–20	AIK	Allsv	50	1	8	9	8	—	—	—	—	—
2020–21	Mora IK	Allsv	45	5	8	13	6	3	0	0	0	0
2021–22	Mora IK	J20	4	0	4	4	2	—	—	—	—	—
2021–22	Mora IK	Allsv	48	2	4	6	8	7	0	0	0	2
2022–23	Mora IK	Allsv	52	4	9	13	4	10	0	0	0	2
2023–24	Frölunda HC	SHL	50	1	6	7	4	14	1	0	1	0
2024–25	Frölunda HC	SHL	51	3	14	17	12	12	1	3	4	0
2025–26	Frölunda HC	SHL	51	1	10	11	12	4	0	0	0	0
SHL totals			152	5	30	35	28	30	2	3	5	0
