= Lyko (company) =

Swedish cosmetics company

- Logo used by LYKO
- Trade name: Lyko Group AB
- Formerly: Lyko Hair AB
- Company type: Public
- Industry: Online retailer Cosmetics
- Predecessor: Hår & Skägg HB
- Founded: May 9, 2003; 22 years ago in Dala-Järna
- Founder: Stefan Lyko
- Headquarters: Vansbro; Stockholm
- Areas served: Fennoscandia; Austria; Germany; Netherlands; Poland
- Key people: Rickard Lyko (CEO)
- Revenue: ▲2.5 billion SEK (2022)
- Operating income: ▼56.4 million SEK
- Net income: ▲2.4 billion SEK (2022)
- Total assets: ▲411.1 million SEK (2022)
- Total equity: ▼240.2 million SEK (2022)
- Website: lyko.com

Lyko (Swedish pronunciation: [ly:ko]; stylized as LYKO) traded as Lyko Group AB, is a Swedish cosmetics brick and mortar- and online retailer. As of 2022 the company reported revenues of 2.5 billion kronor, expected to have risen to 3 billion by the end of 2023, and is among the largest online retailers in Sweden.

The business started in 2003 as Lyko.se, when founder Stefan Lyko created a website to showcase his beauty salon's hair products. By 2006 the website was refined into an actual retail platform. In 2008 his beauty salon, "Hår och Skägg HB", was renamed to Lyko Hair AB. By 2010 the company relocated to nearby Vansbro, where their main warehouse was constructed. In 2017 the company was made public on Nasdaq First North, valued at 766 million kronor, and was again renamed Lyko Group AB. In 2018 the company made its first international venture, entering the Finnish market. By 2020 Lyko operated in eight countries. The 2019 Coronavirus pandemic doubled its customer base. However, the five brick and mortar stores owned by Lyko were closed.

== History ==
The origins of Lyko date back to Frans Lyko, a holocaust survivor from Lviv, Ukraine. Following the liberation of Sachsenhausen in 1945 he immigrated to Sweden where he settled in Vansbro, Dalarna. Working as a barber in the camp allowed him to survive, and upon his arrival to Sweden he was employed by a barber shop in until 1952, when he started his own. In 1971 his son Stefan Lyko started the salon Hår & Skägg in nearby Dala-Järna. By the turn of a century, Stefan gained an interest in computers and the internet, launching the website Lyko.se. The domain was registered on the fifth of May, 2003. The website remained rudimentary until 2006, when it was refined to allow proper online purchase. In 2008 Rickard Lyko, son of Stefan Lyko, became chief executive officer, and renamed the company Lyko Hair AB.

Recognizing the potential of online retail, the business expanded significantly under the rule of Rickard Lyko, and in 2010 the company relocated to Vansbro, where their main warehouse was established. The company still operates one of its two headquarters in Vansbro. In 2014 Lyko acquired company Bellbox, and acquired 30 salons and stores in Sweden and Norway. By 2017 Lyko entered the stock market as a public company, through Nasdaq First North, valued at 766 million kronor. It was subsequently renamed Lyko Group AB. In 2018 the company entered the Finnish market, and by 2020 Lyko operated in eight countries.

By 2022 Lyko ensured that all its delivery options in Sweden were emission-free. According to agreements with delivery companies, they must donate 500 kronor to the Swedish Society for Nature Conservation every time they fail to refuel with fossil-free fuels.

=== Unrest during the opening of Stockholm store ===
The highly anticipated opening of a Lyko store in central Stockholm on 11 November 2023, wherein the first 500 customers were guaranteed a free goodie bag, resulted in people being trampled, and several people launched fireworks into the crowd. People queued throughout the night of the day before opening. Police had to force crowds back to prevent a crowd crush. Lyko issued a press release at lunchtime, apologizing for the chaotic queuing. CEO Richard Lyko stated that he "understands that many are 'super-disappointed'".
