= Vanån =

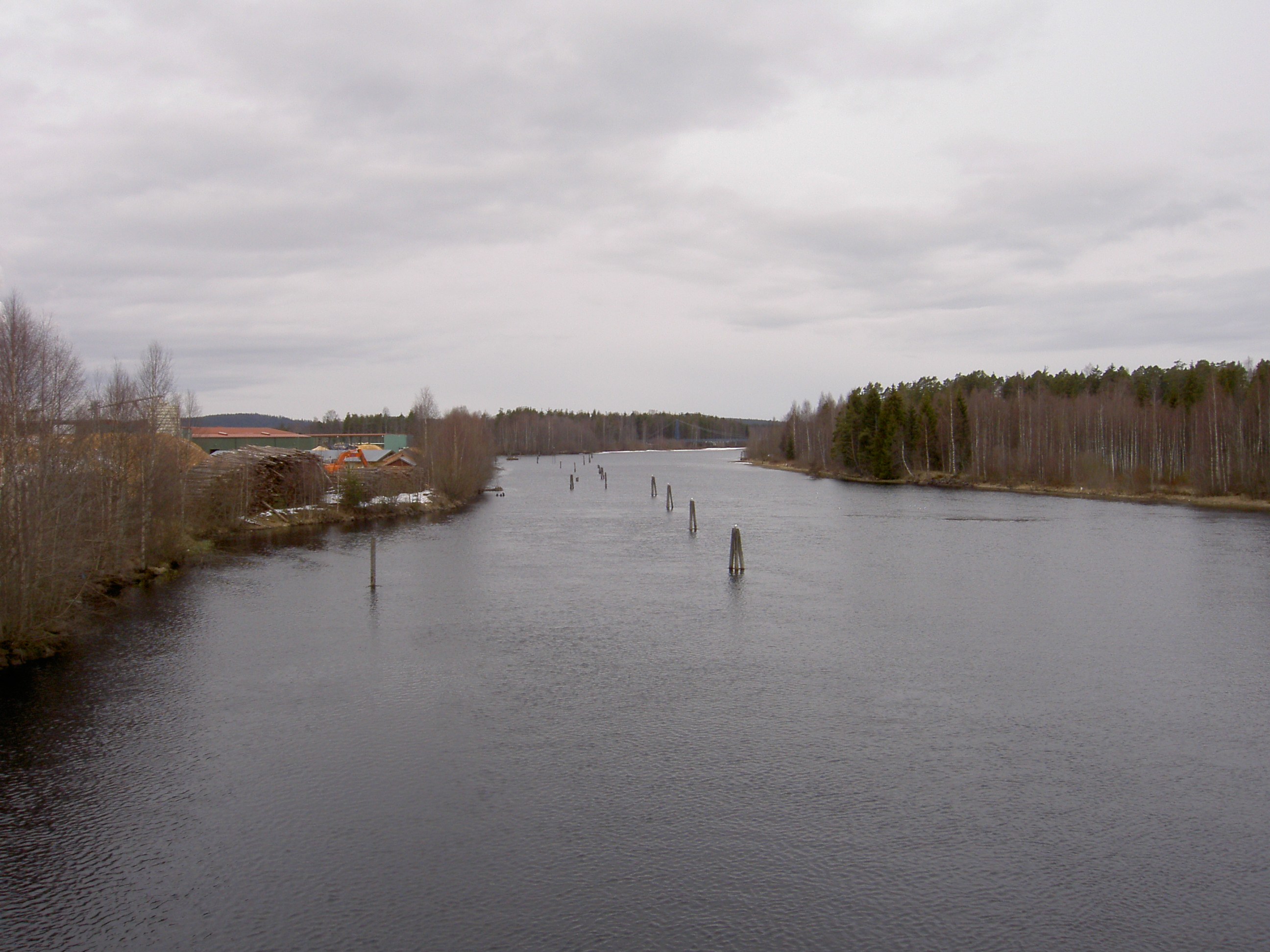

Location
- Country: Sweden
- County: Dalarna County

Physical characteristics
- Mouth: Västerdal River
  - location: Vansbro
  - coordinates: 60°30′35″N 14°14′30″E
- Length: 110 km (68 mi)
- Basin size: 2,380 km^{2} (920 sq mi)
- Discharge
  - average: 28 m^{3}/s (990 cu ft/s)

Vanån is a river in Sweden and the largest tributary of the Västerdal River. The annual open water swimming competition Vansbrosimningen takes place in Vanån (2000 m) and Västerdal River (1000 m).
