= Dala-Järna IK =

Swedish football club

- Full name: Dala-Järna Idrottsklubb
- Nickname: DJIK
- Founded: 1902
- Ground: Idrottsparken; Dala Järna; Sweden
- Chairman: Gösta Lindkvist
- Head coach: Bernhard Brcic
- Coach: Emil Blom; Mikael Aspelin
- League: Division 3 Västra Svealand
- 2010: Division 3 Södra Norrland, 7th
Home colours	Away colours

Dala-Järna IK is a Swedish football club located in Dala Järna in Vansbro Municipality, Dalarna County.

== Background ==
Since their foundation Dala-Järna IK has participated mainly in the middle and lower divisions of the Swedish football league system. The club currently plays in Division 3 Västra Svealand which is the fifth tier of Swedish football. They play their home matches at the Idrottsparken in Dala Järna.

Dala-Järna IK are affiliated to Dalarnas Fotbollförbund.

== Recent history ==
In recent seasons Dala-Järna IK have competed in the following divisions:

2011 – Division 3 västra Svealand
2010 – Division 3 Södra Norrland
2009 – Division 3 Södra Norrland
2008 – Division 3 Södra Norrland
2007 – Division 3 Södra Norrland
2006 – Division 3 Södra Norrland
2005 – Division 4 Dalarna
2004 – Division 4 Dalarna
2003 – Division 3 Södra Norrland
2002 – Division 3 Södra Norrland
2001 – Division 4 Dalarna
2000 – Division 4 Dalarna
1999 – Division 4 Dalarna

== Attendances ==
In recent seasons Dala-Järna IK have had the following average attendances:

Season	Average attendance	Division / Section	Level
2001	Not available	Div 4 Dalarna	Tier 5
2002	348	Div 3 Södra Norrland	Tier 4
2003	284	Div 3 Södra Norrland	Tier 4
2004	Not available	Div 4 Dalarna	Tier 5
2005	Not available	Div 4 Dalarna	Tier 5
2006	176	Div 3 Södra Norrland	Tier 5
2007	247	Div 3 Södra Norrland	Tier 5
2008	219	Div 3 Södra Norrland	Tier 5
2009	194	Div 3 Södra Norrland	Tier 5
2010	240	Div 3 Södra Norrland	Tier 5

* Attendances are provided in the Publikliga sections of the Svenska Fotbollförbundet website and European Football Statistics website.
