= Lyko =

Lyko is a surname. Notable people with this surname include:

- Antoni Łyko (1907–1941), Polish footballer
- Uwe Lyko (born 1954), German comedian and cabaretist

== See also ==
- Lyko (company), Swedish cosmetics company
