= Järna =

Järna may refer to:

- Järna, Södertälje Municipality, Stockholm County, Sweden
- Järna, Vansbro Municipality, Dalarna County, Sweden
