= Swedish Classic Circuit =

Athletic diploma

En svensk klassiker, Swedish classic circuit, is a diploma awarded to those who have finished races in four race disciplines (cross country skiing (90 km), cycling (315 km), swimming (3 km), and cross country running (30 km)) during a 12-month period. The diploma was first awarded in 1972.

Thousands of people, mostly Swedes, take part in all four each year and receive the Swedish Classic Circuit award. More than 28,000 people (more than 4,500 women) have achieved this.

== Races ==
Discipline	Race	Length (KM)	Length (Miles)	Month
Cross country skiing	Vasaloppet; Öppet spår Engelbrektsloppet	90 km 90 km 60 km	55.9 miles	March; February; February
Cycling	Vätternrundan	315 km	195.7 miles	June
Open water swimming	Vansbrosimningen	3 km	1.9 miles	July
Cross country running	Lidingöloppet	30 km	18.6 miles	September

There is a special version The women's classic circuit, Tjejklassikern, with four events, but about one-third so long distances, meant for those women who believe the real Classic Circuit is too demanding. Another special version is The half classic circuit, Halvklassikern, where the distances cover half the original events.

== Special achievements ==
- The fastest summarised time to participate in all four official race events within 12 months, is made by Oskar Svärd who in 2013-2014 did Vasaloppet in 4:14:52, Vätternrundan in 6:55:59, Vansbrosimningen in 0:48:58 and Lidingöloppet in 1:57:27, in total 13:57:16.
- The fastest summarised time among women is by Kristalina Smårs who in 2018-2019 did Vasaloppet (Öppet Spår) in 5:57:53, Vätternrundan in 6:54:19, Vansbrosimningen (Öppen Älv) in 0:52:10 and Lidingöloppet in 2:17:56, in total 16:02:18.
- Aron Anderson was the first wheelchair user to complete the circuit, in 2013–2014, total time 22:46:13
- There are records of finishing all four races directly after each other, but then only one of them at its official race day.
  - In 2004, triathlete Jonas Colting finished all four races of the Swedish Classic Circuit directly after each other. He started with the Vansbrosimningen, Vasaloppet on roller-skis, Vätternrundan, and then finished with Lidingöloppet. He finished in 25 hours and 17 minutes including transport. Actual racing time was 17 hours and 59 minutes.
  - Andreas Lindén has the record for best time to finish all the races consecutively. In June 2010 he started with Vasaloppet on roller-skis, swam 3 km in Vansbrosimmet. From there he was transported with helicopter to Motala and cycled in Vätternrundan. He was once more transported to Lidingö where he ran the Lidingöloppet route of 30 km. Total time, including transport, was 19 hours and 46 minutes.
  - In February 2017, Jonas Ekblom became the first person to complete all the races consecutively in winter. He started with the real Vasaloppet, to be transported to Motala and Vätternrundan. Since the waters in Vansbro were frozen he swam the 3 km in lake Vättern instead. He finished with Lidingöloppet for a total time of 38 hours, where actual racing time was 27 hours.
