= Vansbrosimningen =

Open water swimming competition in Sweden

Coordinates: 60°30′19″N 14°13′49″E

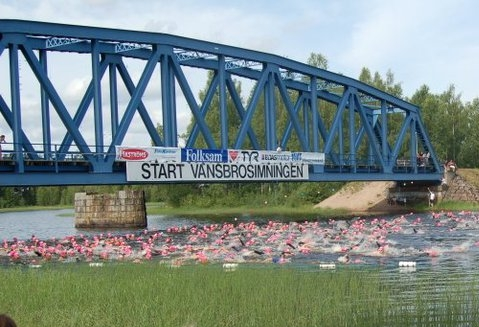
- Vansbrosimningen in 2010.
- Status: active
- Genre: sporting event
- Date: July
- Frequency: annual
- Country: Sweden
- Inaugurated: 1950
- Organiser: Vansbro AIK

Vansbrosimningen or Vansbrosimmet is an annual open water swimming competition held in July in Vansbro, Dalarna, Sweden since 1950. The distance is 3,000 m, first 2,000 m downstream in Vanån then 1,000 m upstream in Västerdal River. It is part of En svensk klassiker, the "Swedish Classic" which also includes crosscountry skiing (Vasaloppet, 90 kilometers), biking (Vätternrundan, 300 kilometers) and running (Lidingöloppet, 30 kilometers).

== Winners ==
=== Men ===
No winners were selected the years 1950–1955.

Year	Name	Club/Nation	Time
1956	Göran Åberg	Örebro SS	42.34
1957	Glenn Pettersson	Upsala SS	42.19
1958	Glenn Pettersson	Upsala SS	37.12
1959	Glenn Pettersson	Upsala SS	38.20
1960	Håkan Bengtsson	Stockholmspolisens IF	39.50
1961	Mats Svensson	Elfsborgs IF	37.20
1962	Sten Ekman	Tunafors SK	37.55
1963	Mats Svensson	Elfsborgs IF	35.38
1964	Tommy Danielsson	Stockholms KK	40.40
1965	Hans Rosendal	Katrineholms SS	38.04
1966	Sven von Holst	Stockholms KK	36.13
1967	Birger Eriksson	Stockholmspolisens IF	35.59
1968	Erkki Hänninen	Finland	36.10
1969	Peter Feil	Eskilstuna SS	33.50
1970	Sven von Holst	Stockholms KK	35.07
1971	Olle Fransson	Eskilstuna SS	34.29
1972	Bengt Jönsson	Sollefteå ASS	35.58
1973	Anders Sandberg	SKK-Spårvägen	34.23
1974	Anders Sandberg	SKK-Spårvägen	34.36
1975	Bengt Jönsson	Sollefteå ASS	34.57
1976	Bernt Zarnowiecki	Falu SS	35.28
1977	Owe Lindqvist	Borlänge SS	33.40
1978	Sven von Holst	Falu SS	34.35
1979	Kent Andersson	Oxelösunds SS	33.48
1980	Kent Andersson	Oxelösunds SS	23.48 (shortened)
1981	Canceled		
1982	Kent Andersson	Oxelösunds SS	34.42
1983	Kent Andersson	Oxelösunds SS	33.28
1984	Kent Andersson	Simavdelningen 1902	21.51 (shortened)
1985	Krister Sikström	Västerås SS	33.26
1986	Henrik Jangvall	Sundsvalls SS	32.30
1987	Mats Nygren	Västerås SS	32.11
1988	Jarmo Salonen	Södertälje SS	32.20
1989	Magnus Karlsson	Norrköpings KK	31.07
1990	Magnus Karlsson	Norrköpings KK	21.06 (shortened)
1991	Canceled		
1992	Ola Strömberg	Malmö KK	31.38
1993	Mikael E Rosén	Fagersta SK	18.01 (shortened)
1994	Ola Strömberg	Malmö KK	32.06
1995	Canceled		
1996	Oscar Forsberg	Motala SS	20.08 (shortened)
1997	Oscar Forsberg	Motala SS	31.33
1998	Joachim Willén	Motala SS	31.55
1999	Mikael E Rosén	Sundsvalls SS	30.47
2000	Fredrik Olsson	Hudiksvalls SS	17.58 (shortened)
2001	Mikael E Rosén	Stockholmspolisens IF	32.04
2002	Fredrik Olsson	Hudiksvalls SS	29.46
2003	Fredrik Olsson	Hudiksvalls SS	29.45
2004	Fredrik Olsson	Hudiksvalls SS	32.31
2005	Erik Strand	Falu SS	33.31,9
2006	Daniel Halldén	Trollhättans SS	31.55
2007	Mike Thorén	Motala SS	31.56
2008	Mike Thorén	Linköpings ASS	31.57
2009	Johan Sandberg	Väsby SS	29.52
2010	Mike Thorén	Motala SS	31.32
2011	Nicklas Luplau	West Swim Esbjerg	30.05
2012	Tim Arnesen	Mölndals Allmänna SS	30.24
