= Swedish champions =

Swedish champions may refer to:

- List of Swedish bandy champions
  - List of Swedish bandy champions (players)
- List of Swedish bandy champions
- List of Swedish football champions
  - List of Swedish football champions (players)
- List of Swedish women's football champions
  - List of Swedish women's football champions (players)
- List of Swedish youth football champions
- List of Swedish men's handball champions
- List of Swedish ice hockey champions
  - List of Swedish ice hockey champions (players)
- List of Swedish ice hockey junior champions
- Lists of Swedish Swimming Championships champions
  - List of Swedish Swimming Championships champions (men)
  - List of Swedish Swimming Championships champions (women)
- List of Swedish Short Course Swimming Championships champions
  - List of Swedish Short Course Swimming Championships champions (men)
  - List of Swedish Short Course Swimming Championships champions (women)
