= Västerdal River =

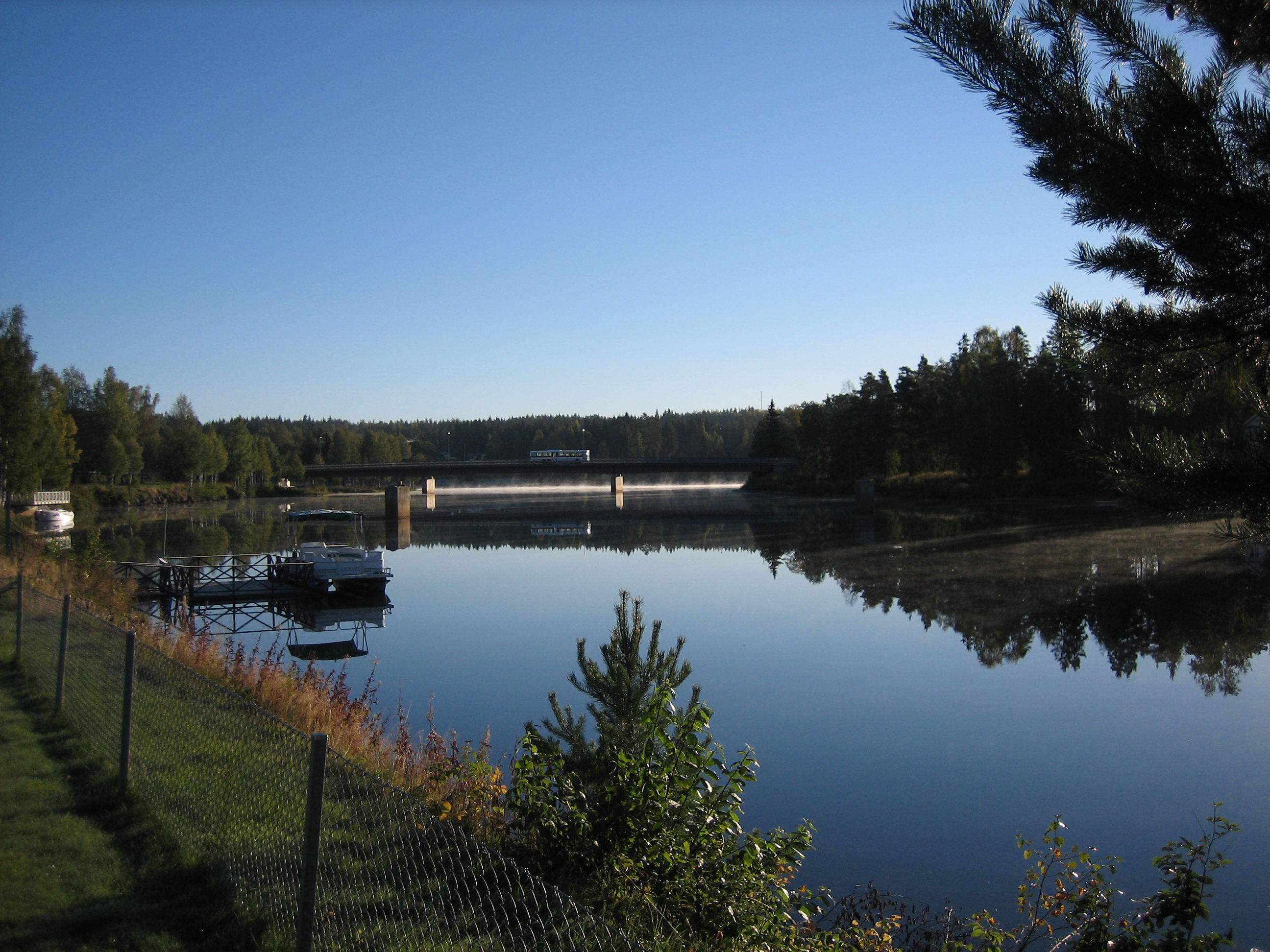
- Västerdal River in Vansbro
- Native name: Västerdalälven (Swedish)

Location
- Country: Sweden

Physical characteristics
- Mouth
  - location: Djurås
  - coordinates: 60°33′N 15°08′E
- Length: 300 km (190 mi)
- Basin size: 8,640 km^{2} (3,340 sq mi)

Västerdalälven (literally West Dal River) is a 300 km long river in Sweden that flows southeast through Dalarna. Its sources are Görälven and Fuluälven and the end point is Djurås, in the municipality of Gagnef, where it connects with Österdalälven to form Dalälven. The annual open water swimming competition Vansbrosimningen takes place in Vanån (2000 m) and Västerdal River (1000 m).

The Vanån is the largest tributary of the Västerdal River.
