= Mikael Strandberg =

Swedish explorer, filmmaker and writer (born 1962)

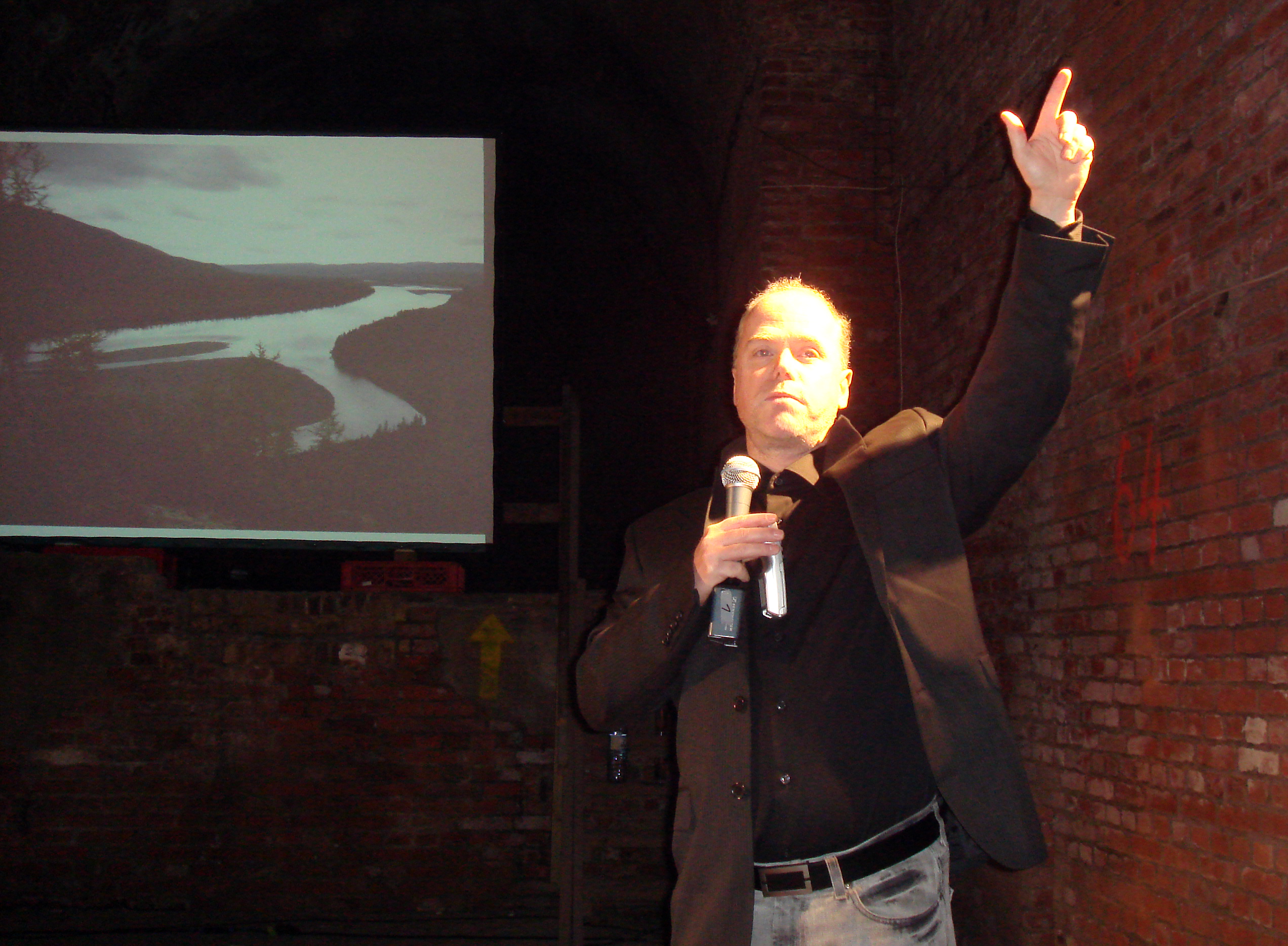
- Born: February 15, 1962 (age 64); Dala-Järna
- Occupations: Lecturer, explorer, author, film maker
- Children: 2 children, Eva and Dana
- Website: www.mikaelstrandberg.com

Mikael Strandberg (born February 15, 1962) is a Swedish explorer, filmmaker and writer.

== Biography ==
Mikael Strandberg was born in 1962 in Dala-Järna, Sweden. He started his professional career as an explorer 28 years ago. He is currently working as a lecturer, film maker and a writer. He has produced four documentaries Patagonia - 3,000 Kilometres by Horse, The Masaai People - 1,000 Kilometres by Foot, -58 Degrees – Exploring Siberia on Skies. and "Expedition Yemen - 126 degrees In The Shade."

== Expeditions ==
- 1986-1987 – Bicycle from Chile to Alaska, a distance of 27,500 kilometers, passing through The Darien Gap.
- 1989-1992 – Bicycle from Norway to South Africa a distance of 33,000 kilometers, passing through the Sahara Desert.
- 1994–1996 – Bicycle from New Zealand to Cairo traversing Asia, a distance of 30 000 kilometers.
- 1997–1998 – Patagonia 3,000 kilometers by horse through Chile and Argentina
- 2000 – A walk through Maasailand in Eastern Africa, Kenya and Tanzania, exploring all clans of the Maasai people.
- 2004 – Exploring the Kolyma River in North-Eastern Siberia. 3500 km:s by canoe and by skis in temperatures below -58 degrees Celsius. He and partner Johan Ivarsson carrying Explorers Club´s Flag 95.
- 2011 – Expedition Yemen By Camel Traveled from Zabid to Sanaa. 380 km:s really rough terrain just to show the world that Yemen is something totally different to what global media says.
- 2012 - Expedition Yemen By Camel Crossing The Sands of Al Mahra. 350 km:s from Al Ghardaia to Rumah in the summer. He and partner Tanya Holm carried Explorers Clubs Flag 179
- 2013 - Expedition Frozen Frontier: Travelling through Siberia with reindeer and sleds. Mikael travelled 650 km:s from Oymyakon to the village of Arkah. Temperatures reached close to -60 degrees Celsius during this February trip. He and partners Slava Serginov, Tolya Andreyev, Vika Andreyevna, Yura Grigorovich Osenin. Egor Petrovich Makarov, Yura Stepanovich Berezhnev and Bolot Bochkarev carried Explorer Clubs Flag 179

== Works ==
Strandberg has published six books:

- På Cykel från Chile till Alaska ISBN 91-85014-64-8, ISBN 978-91-85014-64-4.
- På Cykel genom Afrika ISBN 91-85014-65-6
- På Cykel från Nya Zeeland till Kairo ISBN 978-91-85014-88-0
- Sigge - vildhunden från Patagonien ISBN 91-87894-83-1
- Patagonien, 300 mil till häst ISBN 91-87894-88-2
- Massajland - 100 mil till fots ISBN 978-91-7083-032-7
