= Johan Ernst Nilson =

Swedish explorer

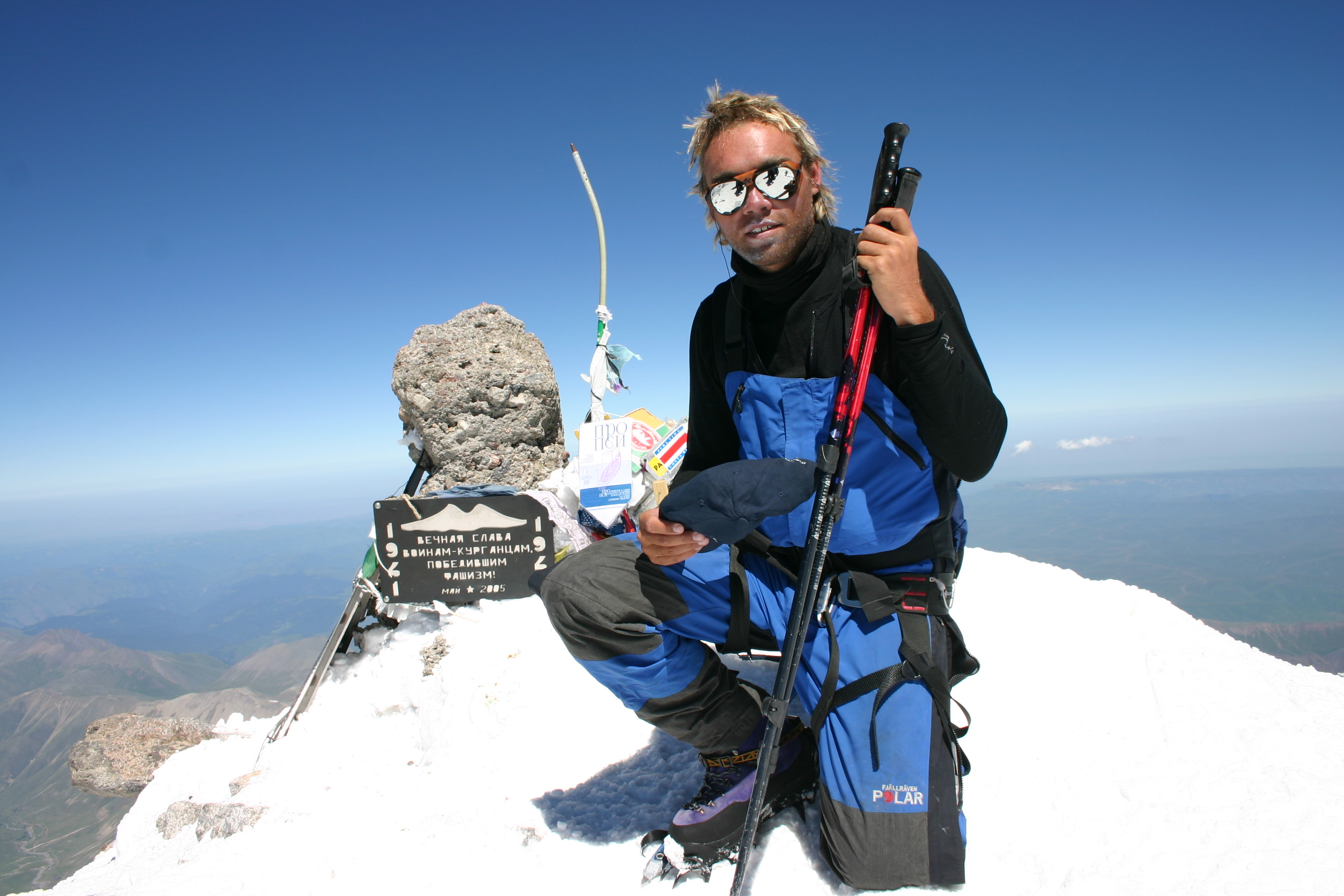
- Johan Nilson in 2007
- Born: 4 August 1969 (age 56); Stockholm, Sweden
- Occupation: Explorer

Johan Ernst Nilson (born 4 August 1969) is a Swedish explorer, known as an "environmental explorer" because of his interest in environment and climate-related issues.

== Life and career ==
Nilson was born in Stockholm, Sweden. He has completed 28 expeditions, visiting around 100 countries. He also gives lectures about motivation and environmental awareness.

After participating in some film work with the Polar Research Team, Nilson began collaborating with Respect Climate. In 2008 he finished his project "Seven Summits Climate Neutral". After the first Climate Neutral Everest expedition, Nilson was elected Swedish President of the Everest Summiteers Association (ESA), and a member of The Explorers Club.

He received the Medal of Honour from the Swedish Church in 1996.

In 2018, Nurali Aliyev announced that Nilson would be the new Ambassador of the Snow Leopard Foundation based in Kazakhstan, representing the interests of the foundation overseas.

=== Expeditions ===
Nilson has completed exhibitions in Africa and Antarctica, as well as to the mountains Denali (1995), Kilimanjaro (2003), Mount Elbrus (2004, 2008), Aconcagua (2005, 2006), Carstensz Pyramid (2006), Mount Everest (2007), Mont Blanc (2006, 2007), Mount Vinson (2008), Mount Kusciuskzo (2006), Shishapangma (1997), Mount Kinabalu (2000), and Heidi Hill Nunavut (1999). His mixed expeditions include the Alaska Walkabout Expedition (1995), Jetski over the Atlantic (2002), Machu Picchu (2005), the Arctic Dogsled Race (1999), and a Borneo Photo Expedition (2000).

In January 2012, Nilson achieved a Guinness Record title for his Three Poles Challenge expedition.

== Publications ==
Nilson published a photobook in November 2008, entitled Seven Summits - The Photobook. ISBN 91-633-3663-4
