= Vansbro Municipality =

Vansbro Municipality Vansbro kommun
- Municipality
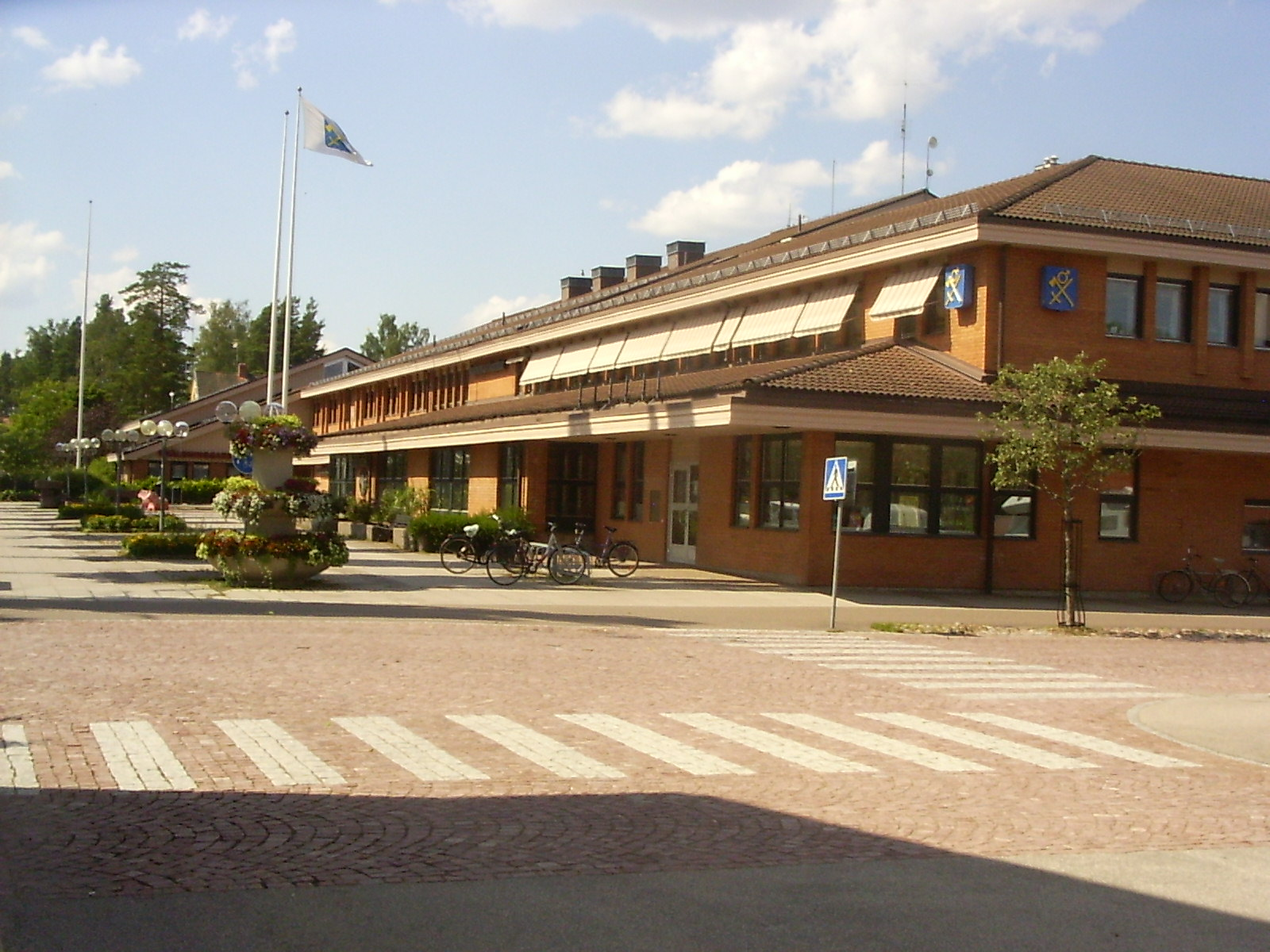

- Coat of arms

- Coordinates: 60°31′N 14°13′E
- Country: Sweden
- County: Dalarna County
- Seat: Vansbro

Area
  - Total: 1,657.35 km^{2} (639.91 sq mi)
  - Land: 1,539.57 km^{2} (594.43 sq mi)
  - Water: 117.78 km^{2} (45.48 sq mi)
- Area as of 1 January 2014.

Population (30 June 2025)
  - Total: 6,753
  - Density: 4.386/km^{2} (11.36/sq mi)
- Time zone: UTC+1 (CET)
  - Summer (DST): UTC+2 (CEST)
- ISO 3166 code: SE
- Province: Dalarna
- Municipal code: 2021
- Website: www.vansbro.se
- Density is calculated using land area only.

Vansbro Municipality (Swedish: Vansbro kommun) is a municipality in Dalarna County in central Sweden. Its seat is located in the town of Vansbro.

During the local government reform of 1971 Järna, Nås and Äppelbo were amalgamated to form the new Vansbro Municipality. The name was taken from the locality Vansbro, which also became the municipal seat.

The coat of arms show the sign of iron, an axe (symbolizing wood industries) and a sword.

== Localities ==
- Vansbro, pop. 2,100
- Järna, pop. 1,500
- Nås, pop. 465
- Äppelbo, pop. 261

== History ==
Many of the parishes and towns of today can be traced several centuries back. Around Järna has been found ovens from the Viking Age or older, showing that the town had been used in the processing of iron for a long time, and probably leading to its name (Järn means iron in Swedish).

Nås parish was mentioned in 1479, Järna parish in 1417, Äppelbo as Äppelboda parish 1417.

Äppelbo (literally "Apple Village") was in the 1690s the seat for the Västerdal regiment, Western Dalarnas regimente. Swedish warlike kings Charles XII and Gustaf IV Adolf made use of the men when they fought around in Europe.

Modern iron works were not established until the early 19th century, and had a short history that ended before the end of the century. The industry then became dominated by wood industry. Around the year 1900, three large saw mills were built in the town, making it prosper. With the railroad located through the town Vansbro in 1898, it further enhanced communications for industries.

== Demographics ==
This is a demographic table based on Vansbro Municipality's electoral districts in the 2022 Swedish general election sourced from SVT's election platform, in turn taken from SCB official statistics.

In total there were 6,766 inhabitants, including 5,305 Swedish citizens of voting age. 43.6 % voted for the left coalition and 54.9 % for the right coalition. Indicators are in percentage points except population totals and income.

Location	Residents	Citizen adults	Left vote	Right vote	Employed	Swedish parents	Foreign heritage	Income SEK	Degree
Location			%	%					
Järna	2,259	1,803	42.1	56.5	86	94	6	23,578	24
Nås	877	694	43.3	54.3	81	90	10	21,407	22
Vansbro	2,706	2,085	47.0	51.8	79	82	18	21,773	24
Äppelbo	924	723	39.7	58.3	85	94	6	24,463	26
Source: SVT

== Riksdag elections ==
Year	%	Votes	V	S	MP	C	L	KD	M	SD	NyD	Left	Right
1973	90.4	5,928	5.8	42.8		37.5	5.0	3.1	5.6			48.6	48.1
1976	90.9	6,022	4.5	42.6		36.3	5.9	2.7	7.9			47.1	50.1
1979	91.0	5,956	5.0	44.1		30.8	5.2	3.5	11.1			49.0	47.1
1982	90.8	5,913	4.5	47.2	1.5	25.5	3.5	3.3	14.4			51.7	43.4
1985	89.4	5,742	4.1	46.0	1.6	24.6	9.5		13.9			50.2	48.0
1988	83.9	5,206	4.6	45.1	5.4	20.5	8.9	4.6	10.8			55.1	40.2
1991	83.7	5,068	4.3	42.0	1.7	17.7	5.3	8.5	12.9		6.8	46.4	44.4
1994	83.3	4,958	6.3	50.3	4.5	14.7	4.1	5.3	12.9		0.9	61.1	37.1
1998	78.2	4,461	13.9	39.4	3.7	10.7	2.5	12.9	13.9			57.1	40.0
2002	75.2	4,132	9.0	42.2	3.1	16.0	6.9	10.8	9.0	1.4		54.2	42.6
2006	79.4	4,247	7.4	39.2	2.9	15.9	3.6	9.3	16.6	2.9		48.9	45.5
2010	82.1	4,398	5.8	40.4	2.6	13.9	3.6	6.8	19.7	6.1		48.8	44.0
2014	84.4	4,441	5.7	36.5	2.7	14.2	2.2	5.9	14.4	16.2		45.0	36.7
2018	86.2	4,501	7.2	29.4	1.2	14.6	2.1	9.7	13.3	20.8		52.4	45.9
2022	84.1	4,390	4.8	28.7	1.9	8.2	1.9	10.7	14.1	28.3		43.6	54.9

== Sister cities ==
Its sister city is Velké Meziříčí, in the Czech Republic.

== Notability ==
In Järna, one of the distinct Dalacarlia dialects are spoken.
