= Bengt Jönsson (swimmer) =

Swedish swimmer (born 1955)

Personal information
- Born: 24 December 1955 (age 70) Stensele, Sweden

Sport
- Sport: Swimming

Bengt Jönsson (born 24 December 1955) is a Swedish former swimmer. He competed in the men's 400 metre freestyle at the 1976 Summer Olympics.
