= List of Swedish Short Course Swimming Championships champions =

See:

- List of Swedish Short Course Swimming Championships champions (men)
- List of Swedish Short Course Swimming Championships champions (women)
