= Vansbro AIK =

Swedish football club

Vansbro AIK FK
- Full name: Vansbro Allmänna Idrottsklubb Fotbollklubb
- Founded: 1920
- Ground: Vanåvallen; Vansbro; Sweden
- Chairman: Åsa Bergström
- League: Division 4 Dalarna
Home colours

Vansbro AIK FK is a Swedish football club located in Vansbro.

== Background ==
Vansbro AIK FK currently plays in Division 4 Dalarna which is the sixth tier of Swedish football. They play their home matches at the Vanåvallen in Vansbro. Vanåvallen was built in 1939 and its record attendance dates back to 1957 when 2 074 persons watched the derby game against Malungs IF.

The club is affiliated to Dalarnas Fotbollförbund. Vansbro AIK have competed in the Svenska Cupen on 18 occasions and have played 21 matches in the competition.

== Season to season ==
In their most successful period Vansbro AIK FK competed in the following divisions:

Season	Level	Division	Section	Position	Movements
1957–58	Tier 4	Division 4	Dalarna	2nd	
1959	Tier 4	Division 4	Dalarna	1st	Promoted
1960	Tier 3	Division 3	Norra Svealand	7th	
1961	Tier 3	Division 3	Norra Svealand	9th	
1962	Tier 3	Division 3	Norra Svealand	4th	
1963	Tier 3	Division 3	Norra Svealand	5th	
1964	Tier 3	Division 3	Västra Svealand	7th	
1965	Tier 3	Division 3	Norra Svealand	12th	Relegated
1966	Tier 4	Division 4	Dalarna	8th	
1967	Tier 4	Division 4	Dalarna	11th	Relegated

In recent seasons Vansbro AIK FK have competed in the following divisions:

Season	Level	Division	Section	Position	Movements
2006*	Tier 7	Division 5	Dalarna Norra	5th	
2007	Tier 7	Division 5	Dalarna Norra	2nd	
2008	Tier 7	Division 5	Dalarna Norra	2nd	
2009	Tier 7	Division 5	Dalarna Norra	1st	Promoted
2010	Tier 6	Division 4	Dalarna	2nd	Promotion Playoffs
2011	Tier 6	Division 4	Dalarna	3rd	

* League restructuring in 2006 resulted in a new division being created at Tier 3 and subsequent divisions dropping a level.
