= Järna, Vansbro Municipality =

Järna
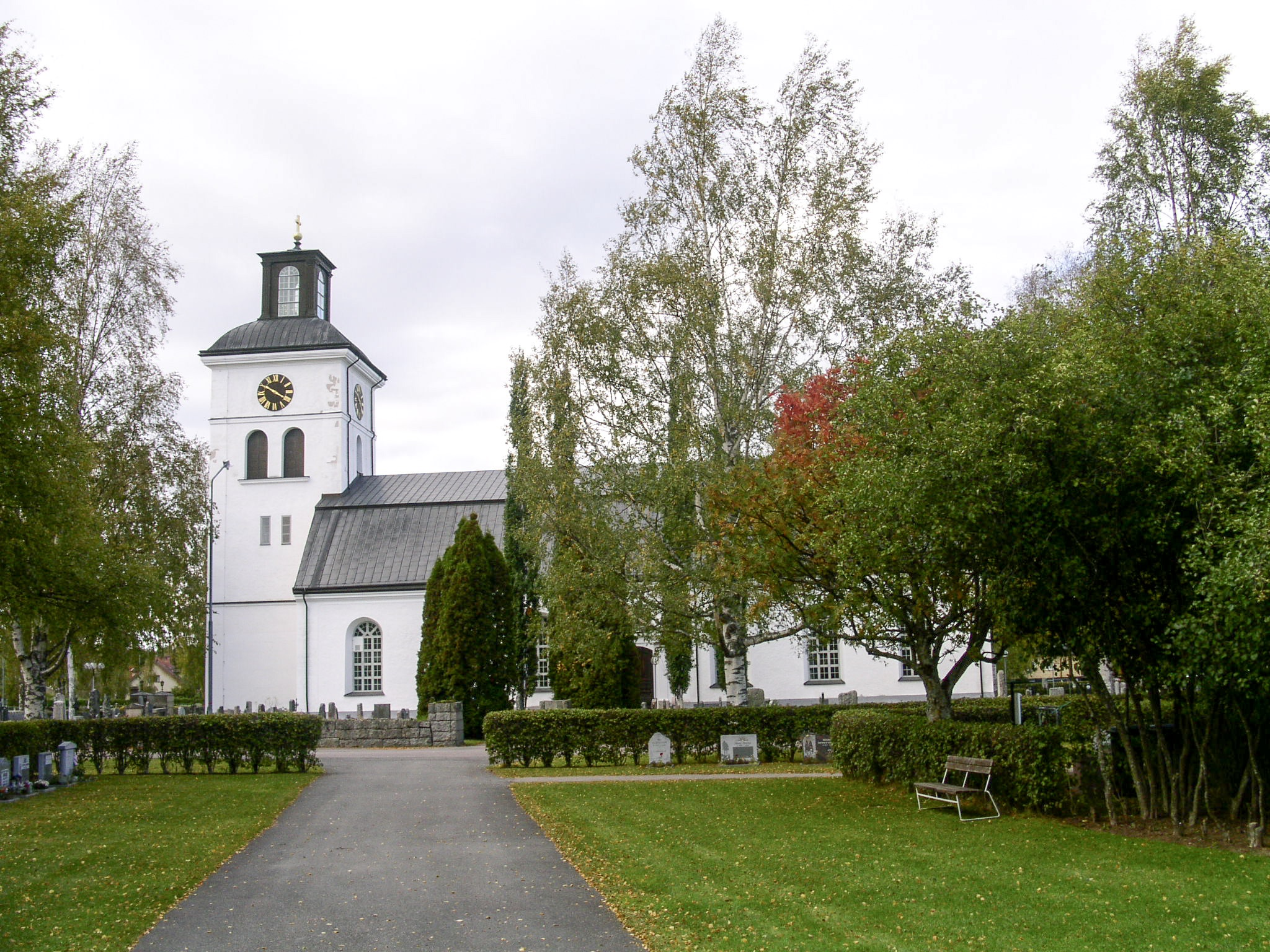
- Järna Church

- Location within Dalarna Location within Sweden
- Coordinates: 60°33′N 14°21′E
- Country: Sweden
- Province: Dalarna
- County: Dalarna County
- Municipality: Vansbro Municipality

Area
  - Total: 3.18 km^{2} (1.23 sq mi)

Population (31 December 2010)
  - Total: 1,413
  - Density: 444/km^{2} (1,150/sq mi)
- Time zone: UTC+1 (CET)
  - Summer (DST): UTC+2 (CEST)

Järna (also Dala-Järna to distinguish it from Järna in Södertälje Municipality) is a locality situated in Vansbro Municipality, Dalarna County, Sweden with 1,413 inhabitants in 2010.

The last traditional player of the Swedish bagpipes, Gudmunds Nils Larsson (died 1949), was from Järna.

== Notable people ==
- Jonny Danielsson (born 1964), long-distance runner
- Sven-Erik Danielsson (born 1960), cross-country skier
- Moa Ilar (born 1997), cross-country skier
- Carl Munters (born 1897), inventor
- Mikael Strandberg (born 1962), explorer, filmmaker and writer
- Gunde Svan (born 1962), cross-country skier

== Sports ==
The following sports clubs are located in Dala Järna:

- Dala-Järna IK
- Dala-Järna Windsurfing Klubb
