= Vätternrundan =

Bicycle race in Sweden

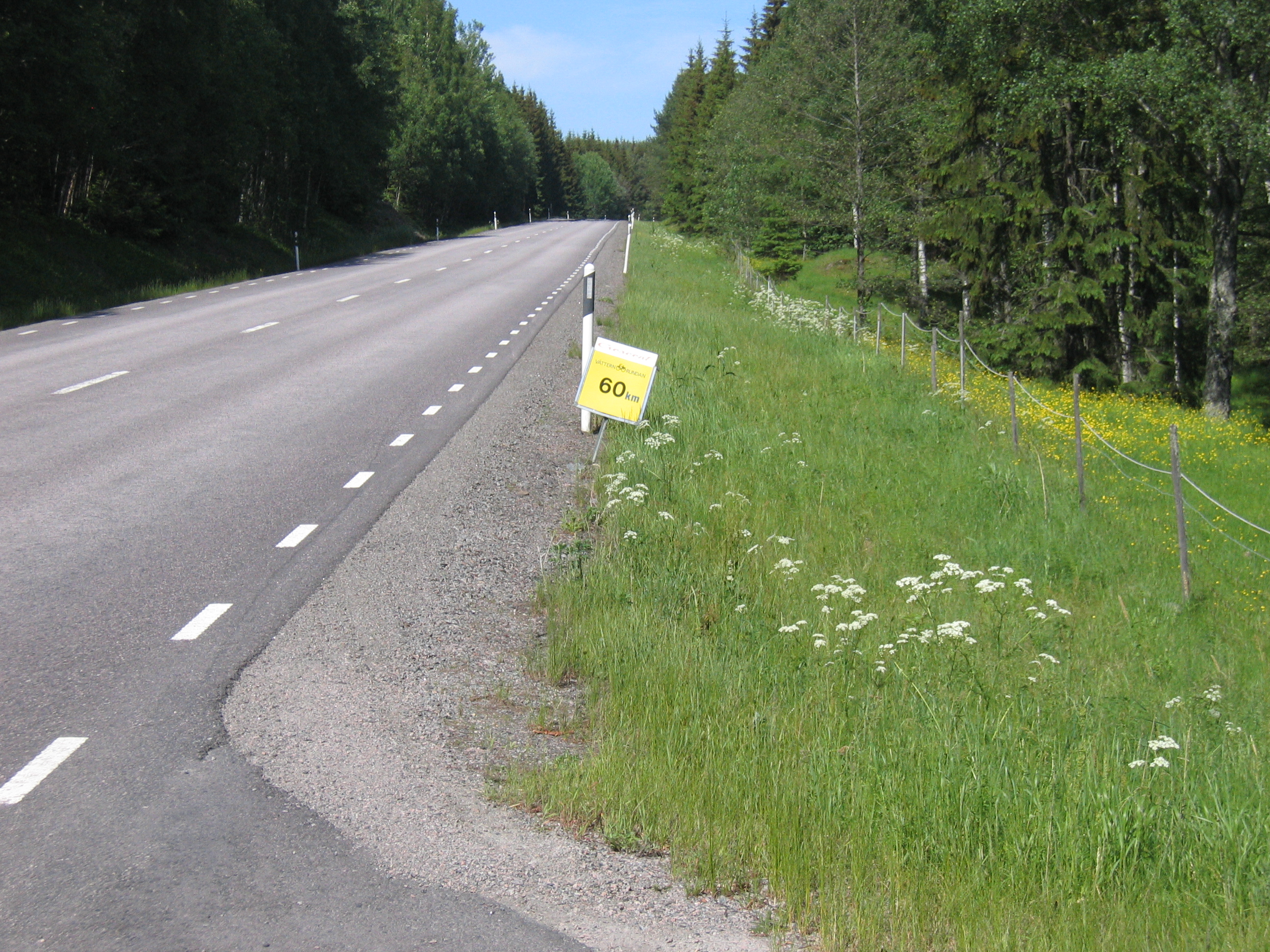
- Section of the route.

Race details
- Date: mid-June
- Region: Sweden
- Discipline: cyclosportive
- Type: one-day

History
- First edition: 1966

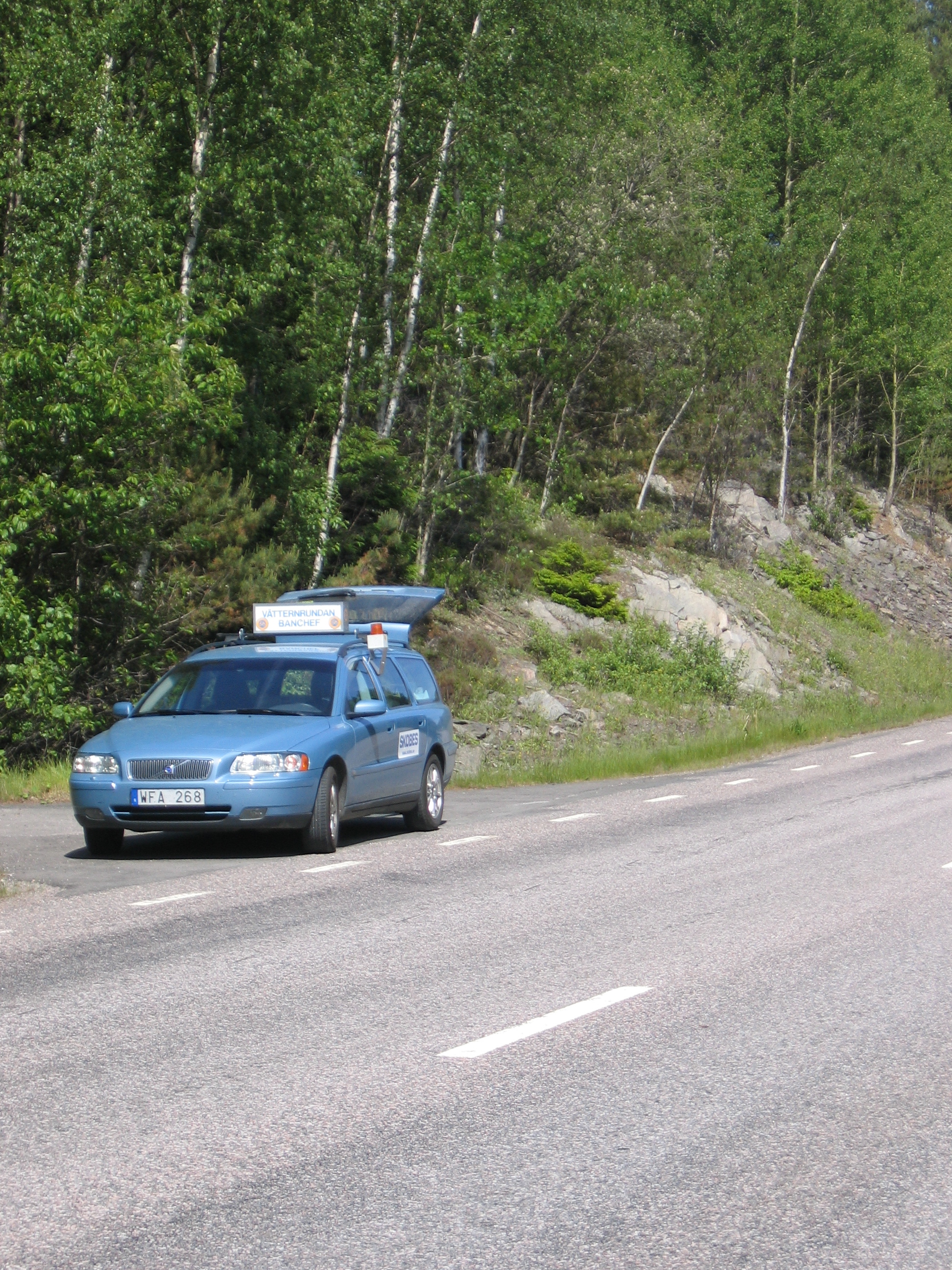
Vätternrundan route master.

Vätternrundan is a 315 km (196 mi) (300 km (190 mi) before 2020) cyclosportive event held annually over two weekends in June in Sweden. In 2011, 27,973 cyclists passed the finish line; 18,272 on the 300 km (190 mi) course, 3,686 on the 150 km (93 mi) course, and 6,015 on the 100 km (62 mi) course). The 315 km course circles Lake Vättern, starting and finishing in the town of Motala. Approximately 20 percent of the participants are non-Swedish and in 2011, 37 nations were represented on the course.

For the 2012 event, registration for the main event was limited to a maximum of 23,000 participants.

The cyclists start in groups of 60 or 70, in a two-minute interval between groups. The first group starts at 7:30 pm on Friday and the last group starts at about 5:30 am on Saturday. In 2010, a new element was introduced as the number of faster cyclists have increased: groups of cyclists aiming for completing the event in less than 9 hours can start between 9:00–9:30 am on Saturday morning. In 2011, 720 cyclists took advantage of this possibility. By allowing these cyclists to start later means that they will have fewer cyclists to pass, thus lowering the risk of incidents and accidents. The course has to be finished by midnight on Saturday.

Vätternrundan is a non-competitive event, and only measures the rider's own time using RF transponders on the helmet (mandatory equipment). An unsorted list of starting times, checkpoints passed and finishing times is published on the website after the event. This type of event is called a motionslopp (cyclosportive) in Sweden.

Vätternrundan has approximately nine stops offering food and beverages, and also first aid and free massage. At the finish line riders are awarded a medal and a certificate of achievement, and offered a meal. For safety reasons support cars and personal resupply stops are prohibited. Cyclists returning home by car are prohibited from using their cars within six hours after having finished the event, since fatigue has caused crashes—even fatal ones. The police perform spot checks of drivers after the ride.

== History ==
Vätternrundan was first held in 1966 when 334 people completed the course. Originally the course went counter-clockwise around the lake, but turned in 1974. Note that the turning was seven years after right-hand traffic was introduced in Sweden and not therefore as a direct result as some believe. In 2021 there was still one pioneer who had completed all 51 events since 1966.

The event was founded by Sten-Otto Liljedahl, a physician specialising in sports medicine; he was team doctor for the Swedish national football side from 1957 to 1970. He developed the idea of cycling around Lake Vättern while spending his summers in Motala, monitoring the effects of training, nutrition and exertion on the individuals participating in his trial runs. In 2011, at the start of the main event, the organisers unveiled a statue in Liljedahl's memory.

The 2020 edition was cancelled because of the Coronavirus pandemic. The 2021 edition was moved, because of the same pandemic, from mid June to early September.

== Associated events ==
Vätternrundan is one element of the Swedish Classic Circuit series of sporting events En svensk klassiker and an associate of the Scandinavian Circuit Tour series of cycling events Skandinavialoppet.
