= Vansbro =

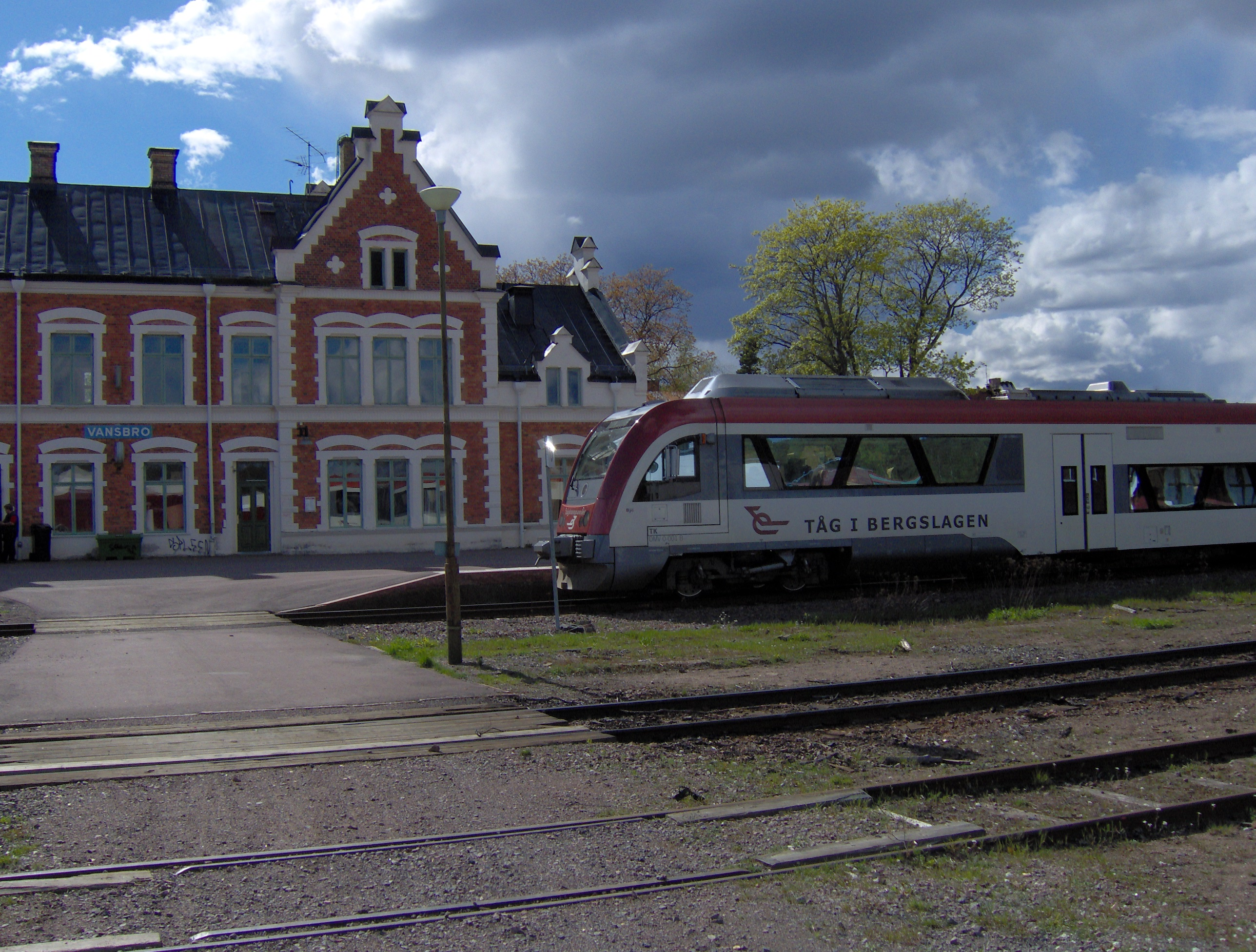
- Vansbro railway station

- Location within Dalarna Location within Sweden
- Coordinates: 60°31′N 14°13′E
- Country: Sweden
- Province: Dalarna
- County: Dalarna County
- Municipality: Vansbro Municipality

Area
  - Total: 3.31 km^{2} (1.28 sq mi)

Population (31 December 2010)
  - Total: 2,026
  - Density: 613/km^{2} (1,590/sq mi)
- Time zone: UTC+1 (CET)
  - Summer (DST): UTC+2 (CEST)

Vansbro (Swedish pronunciation: [ˈvɑ̌ːnsbrʊ]) is a locality in Dalarna and the seat of Vansbro Municipality, Dalarna County, Sweden. It had 2,026 inhabitants in 2010, out of a total municipal population of 7,000.

The town is situated by the end of the Vanån, or Van River, the main tributary of the Västerdal River.

== History ==
The first time Vansbro was mentioned in writing was by Carl von Linné during early 18th century. The place have also been mentioned in different texts from the same era under the name Wahnbro or Wansbro. The name is believed to stem from a bridge built across the Vanå river.

The railway between Kristinehamn and Mora was inaugurated in 1890 and the Vansbro railway station was constructed.

== Industry ==
Vansbro's early industrial history was closely connected to timber and logging. The first sawmill in the area, Danielssågen, began operating soon after the railway was built. More sawmills were built in the following years: Dalasågen (the largest sawmill in Sweden at the time) in 1892, and Brosågen in 1893.

== Events ==
Vansbro is known for the annual Vansbrosimningen ("The Vansbro Swim"). Inaugurated in 1950, the competitors swim 2,000 meters in Vanån and 1,000 meters in the Västerdal River.

== Famous people from Vansbro ==
Vansbro is also known to be the home town of famous cross-country skier Gunde Svan, the band Svenne Rubins, the singer/songwriter Malin Jonsson, the progressive rock band Introitus, the progressive death metal-band In Mourning, the pop-singer Björn Skifs.
