= Results of the 2018 Swedish general election =

General elections were held in Sweden on Sunday 9 September 2018 to elect the 349 members of the Riksdag.

== Overall results ==
Party	Votes	%	Seats			
Party	Votes	%	Con.	Lev.	Tot.	+/–
Swedish Social Democratic Party	1,830,386	28.26	94	6	100	−13
Moderate Party	1,284,698	19.84	66	4	70	−14
Sweden Democrats	1,135,627	17.53	61	1	62	+13
Centre Party	557,500	8.61	31	0	31	+9
Left Party	518,454	8.00	25	3	28	+7
Christian Democrats	409,478	6.32	16	6	22	+6
Liberals	355,546	5.49	12	8	20	+1
Green Party	285,899	4.41	5	11	16	−9
Feminist Initiative	29,665	0.46	0	0	0	0
Alternative for Sweden	20,290	0.31	0	0	0	New
Citizens' Coalition	13,056	0.20	0	0	0	New
Pirate Party	7,326	0.11	0	0	0	0
Direct Democrats	5,153	0.08	0	0	0	0
Independent Rural Party	4,962	0.08	0	0	0	New
Enhet	4,647	0.07	0	0	0	0
Animals' Party	3,648	0.06	0	0	0	0
Christian Values Party	3,202	0.05	0	0	0	0
Nordic Resistance Movement	2,106	0.03	0	0	0	New
Classical Liberal Party	1,504	0.02	0	0	0	0
Communist Party of Sweden	702	0.01	0	0	0	0
Basic Income Party	632	0.01	0	0	0	New
Initiative	615	0.01	0	0	0	New
Security Party	511	0.01	0	0	0	New
Scania Party	296	0.00	0	0	0	0
Norrlandspartiet	60	0.00	0	0	0	New
Libertarian Freedom Party	53	0.00	0	0	0	New
European Workers Party	52	0.00	0	0	0	0
NY Reform	32	0.00	0	0	0	New
Common Sense in Sweden	21	0.00	0	0	0	New
Our Country – Sweden	9	0.00	0	0	0	New
Reformist Neutral Party	4	0.00	0	0	0	0
People's Home Sweden	2	0.00	0	0	0	New
Yellow Party	1	0.00	0	0	0	0
Parties not on the ballot	588	0.01	0	0	0	–
Total	6,476,725	100.00	310	39	349	0
Valid votes	6,476,725	99.10				
Invalid/blank votes	58,546	0.90				
Total votes	6,535,271	100.00				
Registered voters/turnout	7,495,936	87.18				
Source: VAL

=== By alliance ===
Party	Votes	%	Seats	+/–
Red-Greens (S+MP+V)	2,634,739	40.68	144	−15
The Alliance (M+C+L+KD)	2,607,222	40.26	143	+2
Sweden Democrats	1,135,627	17.53	62	+13
Other parties	99,137	1.53	0	–
Total	6,476,725	100.00	349	0
Valid votes	6,476,725	99.10		
Invalid/blank votes	58,546	0.90		
Total votes	6,535,271	100.00		
Registered voters/turnout	7,495,936	87.18		
Source: VAL

== Elected MPs ==
Location	S	M	SD	C	V	KD	L	MP	Total
Blekinge	2	1	2						5
Dalarna	3	2	9	1	6	1			10
Gothenburg	4	4	2	1	3	1	2	2	19
Gotland	1			1					2
Gävleborg	3	2	2	1	1				9
Halland	3	3	2	1	1	1	1	1	13
Jämtland	2	1	1	1					5
Jönköping	3	2	2	1	1	2	1	1	13
Kalmar	3	1	2	1		1			8
Kronoberg	2	1	2	1					6
Malmö	3	2	2	1	1		1	1	11
Norrbotten	4	1	1	1	1				8
Skåne NE	3	2	3	1		1	1		11
Skåne S	3	3	3	1	1	1	1	1	14
Skåne W	3	2	3	1		1	1		11
Stockholm (city)	8	7	3	3	4	1	3	3	32
Stockholm County	10	11	7	3	3	3	3	3	43
Södermanland	3	2	2	1	1	1			10
Uppsala	4	2	2	1	1	1	1	1	13
Värmland	3	2	2	1	1	1	1		11
Västerbotten	4	2	1	1	1				9
Västernorrland	4	1	1	1	1				8
Västmanland	3	2	2		1		1		9
Västra Götaland E	3	2	2	1	1	1			10
Västra Götaland N	3	2	2	1	1	1			10
Västra Götaland S	2	2	2	1		1			8
Västra Götaland W	3	3	2	1	1	1	1	1	13
Örebro	3	2	2	1	1	1	1	1	12
Östergötland	5	3	3	1	1	1	1	1	16
Total	100	70	62	31	28	22	20	16	349
Source: val.se

== Results by greater region ==
=== By percentage share ===
Location	Turnout	Share	Votes	S	M	SD	C	V	KD	L	MP	Other
Götaland	87.2	48.0	3,106,529	27.1	20.0	19.8	8.3	7.0	6.7	5.4	4.2	1.5
Svealand	87.2	40.0	2,591,044	26.8	21.5	15.4	8.6	8.6	6.2	6.2	5.1	1.6
Norrland	87.2	12.0	779,152	37.8	13.9	15.5	9.7	9.8	5.1	3.6	3.2	1.4
Total	87.2	100.0	6,476,725	28.3	19.8	17.5	8.6	8.0	6.3	5.5	4.4	1.5
Source: val.se

=== By votes ===
Location	Turnout	Share	Votes	S	M	SD	C	V	KD	L	MP	Other
Götaland	87.2	48.0	3,106,529	840,923	620,391	615,339	257,938	218,615	209,567	166,777	130,352	46,627
Svealand	87.2	40.0	2,591,044	695,027	556,062	399,494	223,714	223,336	160,078	160,894	130,942	41,497
Norrland	87.2	12.0	779,152	294,436	108,245	120,794	75,848	76,503	39,833	27,875	24,605	11,013
Total	87.2	100.0	6,476,725	1,830,386	1,284,698	1,135,627	557,500	518,454	409,478	355,546	285,899	99,137
Source: val.se

== Results by statistical area ==
=== By percentage share ===
Location	Share	Votes	S	M	SD	C	V	KD	L	MP	Other
East Middle Sweden	16.9	1,093,592	30.1	19.2	17.9	8.0	7.4	6.4	5.3	4.1	1.6
Middle Norrland	3.8	248,224	37.7	13.9	15.6	11.8	8.3	5.2	3.2	3.0	1.4
North Middle Sweden	8.6	557,406	32.9	16.1	19.5	9.5	7.5	5.9	4.0	3.2	1.4
Småland & Islands	8.6	556,143	29.3	17.8	19.4	10.4	5.8	9.0	3.8	3.3	1.3
Stockholm County	22.0	1,426,237	23.4	24.2	12.9	8.8	9.6	6.1	7.3	6.0	1.7
South Sweden	14.6	944,624	25.9	20.9	23.6	6.8	6.3	5.3	5.5	4.1	1.5
Upper Norrland	5.3	345,515	39.9	13.2	13.3	8.6	11.7	5.0	3.6	3.3	1.5
West Sweden	20.1	1,304,984	26.5	20.1	17.7	8.5	8.2	6.8	6.0	4.7	1.6
Total	100.0	6,476,725	28.3	19.8	17.5	8.6	8.0	6.3	5.5	4.4	1.5
Source: val.se

=== By votes ===
Location	Share	Votes	S	M	SD	C	V	KD	L	MP	Other
East Middle Sweden	16.9	1,093,592	329,163	210,137	196,003	87,778	80,572	70,304	57,447	45,069	17,119
Middle Norrland	3.8	248,224	93,514	34,473	38,617	29,194	20,514	12,934	8,040	7,415	3,523
North Middle Sweden	8.6	557,406	183,377	89,873	108,477	52,709	41,916	32,961	22,457	18,043	7,593
Småland & Islands	8.6	556,143	163,031	98,990	107,775	57,645	32,369	50,137	21,056	18,103	7,037
Stockholm County	22.0	1,426,237	333,169	345,740	184,361	125,214	136,683	86,660	104,513	86,086	23,811
South Sweden	14.6	944,624	244,908	197,467	223,154	64,244	59,495	50,314	51,691	38,847	14,504
Upper Norrland	5.3	345,515	137,690	45,438	45,847	29,829	40,506	17,117	12,394	11,529	5,165
West Sweden	20.1	1,304,984	345,534	262,580	231,393	110,887	106,399	89,051	77,948	60,807	20,385
Total	100.0	6,476,725	1,830,386	1,284,698	1,135,627	557,500	518,454	409,478	355,546	285,899	99,137
Source: val.se

== Results by constituency ==
=== Percentage share ===
Location	Land	Turnout	Share	Votes	S	M	SD	C	V	KD	L	MP	Other
Blekinge	G	88.5	1.6	104,514	31.4	17.3	25.2	6.8	5.5	5.7	4.0	2.9	1.3
Dalarna	S	87.6	2.9	188,027	30.7	16.7	20.8	10.0	7.3	6.1	3.6	3.3	1.5
Gothenburg	G	84.3	5.4	349,645	23.8	19.9	13.5	7.1	14.0	5.5	7.3	7.0	2.1
Gotland	G	88.8	0.6	41,129	29.8	16.6	12.7	17.2	9.0	4.1	3.7	5.0	1.9
Gävleborg	N	86.3	2.9	185,413	34.1	15.3	19.6	9.1	8.4	5.3	4.0	3.1	1.3
Halland	G	89.0	3.4	216,982	25.8	22.9	18.6	10.1	4.8	7.1	5.7	3.5	1.4
Jämtland	N	87.1	1.3	85,223	33.6	14.3	15.6	15.4	8.4	4.8	2.9	3.6	1.5
Jönköping	G	88.1	3.5	229,580	27.8	17.7	19.3	10.1	4.9	12.0	4.0	3.2	1.2
Kalmar	G	88.1	2.5	160,864	31.2	17.2	20.6	9.8	6.1	7.2	3.8	2.9	1.2
Kronoberg	G	88.2	1.9	124,570	29.6	19.2	20.3	9.4	6.1	7.6	3.5	3.2	1.2
Malmö	G	82.0	3.0	193,298	29.1	19.5	16.8	5.7	11.9	3.8	5.6	5.6	2.0
Norrbotten	N	86.7	2.6	166,678	41.7	12.8	15.8	7.1	10.7	4.6	3.2	2.8	1.4
Skåne NE	G	86.4	3.1	202,502	25.0	20.2	28.8	6.8	4.1	6.5	4.4	2.9	1.3
Skåne S	G	89.4	3.9	252,804	21.8	24.0	22.1	7.9	5.3	5.4	7.0	4.9	1.6
Skåne W	G	85.2	3.0	191,506	26.1	21.0	26.1	6.4	4.7	5.4	5.2	3.5	1.4
Stockholm (city)	S	87.3	9.4	611,206	23.8	21.9	9.8	9.1	13.1	4.9	7.9	7.7	1.9
Stockholm County	S	86.6	12.6	815,031	23.1	26.0	15.2	8.6	6.9	7.0	6.9	4.8	1.5
Södermanland	S	86.7	2.8	183,449	31.4	20.4	19.3	7.4	6.6	5.5	4.3	3.7	1.3
Uppsala	S	88.9	3.7	241,489	27.0	19.0	15.4	9.2	8.7	6.9	6.2	5.6	2.0
Värmland	S	87.3	2.8	183,966	33.9	16.4	18.0	9.3	7.0	6.3	4.4	3.3	1.3
Västerbotten	N	87.9	2.8	178,837	38.1	13.5	10.9	10.1	12.7	5.2	3.9	3.9	1.6
Västernorrland	N	87.8	2.5	163,001	39.8	13.7	15.6	9.9	8.2	5.4	3.4	2.7	1.4
Västmanland	S	86.7	2.7	172,719	31.4	19.2	20.1	6.7	7.1	5.8	5.5	3.0	1.3
Västra Götaland E	G	88.2	2.7	177,001	30.5	18.4	19.5	9.3	5.7	7.8	4.3	3.1	1.4
Västra Götaland N	G	86.8	2.7	174,573	30.6	17.6	21.4	7.9	6.3	6.5	4.7	3.6	1.4
Västra Götaland S	G	87.4	2.2	143,505	28.0	19.0	19.7	9.6	6.4	7.3	5.3	3.4	1.3
Västra Götaland W	G	89.6	3.8	243,278	24.2	21.8	18.0	8.2	6.8	7.7	6.9	5.0	1.4
Örebro	S	87.7	3.0	195,157	33.1	16.6	18.2	7.8	7.6	6.9	4.6	3.7	1.5
Östergötland	G	88.2	4.6	300,778	29.1	20.4	17.6	8.4	6.8	6.7	5.4	4.2	1.6
Total		87.2	100.0	6,476,725	28.3	19.8	17.5	8.6	8.0	6.3	5.5	4.4	1.5
Source = val.se

=== By votes ===
Location	Land	Turnout	Share	Votes	S	M	SD	C	V	KD	L	MP	Other
Blekinge	G	88.5	1.6	104,514	32,824	18,038	26,342	7,094	5,699	5,954	4,197	3,025	1,341
Dalarna	S	87.6	2.9	188,027	57,776	31,320	39,029	18,813	13,654	11,522	6,848	6,249	2,816
Gothenburg	G	84.3	5.4	349,645	83,097	69,432	47,040	24,893	48,946	19,283	25,337	24,286	7,331
Gotland	G	88.8	0.6	41,129	12,254	6,822	5,226	7,075	3,704	1,699	1,539	2,037	773
Gävleborg	N	86.3	2.9	185,413	63,232	28,334	36,330	16,825	15,483	9,782	7,441	5,661	2,325
Halland	G	89.0	3.4	216,982	56,021	49,630	40,392	21,960	10,498	15,415	12,444	7,690	2,932
Jämtland	N	87.1	1.3	85,223	28,632	12,218	13,257	13,086	7,179	4,118	2,439	3,049	1,245
Jönköping	G	88.1	3.5	229,580	63,782	40,542	44,216	23,084	11,283	27,437	9,096	7,401	2,739
Kalmar	G	88.1	2.5	160,864	50,178	27,733	33,075	15,774	9,851	11,583	6,038	4,645	1,987
Kronoberg	G	88.2	1.9	124,570	36,817	23,893	25,258	11,712	7,531	9,418	4,383	4,020	1,538
Malmö	G	82.0	3.0	193,298	56,248	37,645	32,480	11,003	23,021	7,426	10,812	10,783	3,880
Norrbotten	N	86.7	2.6	166,678	69,493	21,299	26,276	11,751	17,810	7,741	5,356	4,604	2,348
Skåne NE	G	86.4	3.1	202,502	50,610	40,881	58,360	13,855	8,275	13,150	8,984	5,816	2,571
Skåne S	G	89.4	3.9	252,804	55,185	60,619	55,903	19,994	13,426	13,527	17,768	12,435	3,947
Skåne W	G	85.2	3.0	191,506	50,041	40,284	50,069	12,298	9,074	10,257	9,930	6,788	2,765
Stockholm (city)	S	87.3	9.4	611,206	145,245	133,731	60,135	55,428	80,217	29,776	47,988	47,044	11,642
Stockholm County	S	86.6	12.6	815,031	187,924	212,009	124,226	69,786	56,466	56,884	56,525	39,042	12,169
Södermanland	S	86.9	2.8	183,449	57,612	37,401	35,450	13,577	12,162	10,089	7,958	6,773	2,427
Uppsala	S	88.9	3.7	241,489	65,168	45,790	37,297	22,246	21,102	16,661	15,071	13,404	4,750
Värmland	S	87.3	2.8	183,966	62,369	30,219	33,118	17,071	12,779	11,657	8,168	6,133	2,452
Västerbotten	N	87.9	2.8	178,837	68,197	24,139	19,571	18,078	22,696	9,376	7,038	6,925	2,817
Västernorrland	N	87.8	2.5	163,001	64,882	22,255	25,360	16,108	13,335	8,816	5,601	4,366	2,278
Västmanland	S	86.7	2.7	172,719	54,287	33,122	34,740	11,539	12,181	9,969	9,448	5,108	2,325
Västra Götaland E	G	88.2	2.7	177,001	53,888	32,569	34,501	16,533	10,106	13,837	7,662	5,425	2,480
Västra Götaland N	G	86.8	2.7	174,573	53,328	30,794	37,391	13,809	11,029	11,347	8,124	6,349	2,402
Västra Götaland S	G	87.4	2.2	143,505	40,234	27,197	28,221	13,760	9,213	10,445	7,624	4,891	1,920
Västra Götaland W	G	89.6	3.8	243,278	58,966	52,958	43,848	19,932	16,607	18,724	16,757	12,166	3,320
Örebro	S	87.7	3.0	195,157	64,646	32,470	35,499	15,254	14,775	13,520	8,888	7,189	2,916
Östergötland	G	88.2	4.6	300,778	87,450	61,354	53,017	25,162	20,352	20,065	16,082	12,595	4,701
Total		87.2	100.0	6,476,725	1,830,386	1,284,698	1,135,627	557,500	518,454	409,478	355,546	285,899	99,137
Source = val.se

== Municipal summary ==
The blocs have been listed in accordance with the Prime Minister party vote.

Location	Region	Turnout	Votes	S	M	SD	C	V	KD	L	MP	Other	Left-Lib	Right
Ale	Västra Götaland	87.9	19,330	27.9	18.8	22.3	7.0	7.7	6.3	4.7	3.9	1.4	51.3	47.3
Alingsås	Västra Götaland	89.8	27,571	26.4	18.3	15.3	9.8	8.6	7.8	6.7	5.8	1.4	56.4	42.2
Alvesta	Kronoberg	88.3	12,331	28.6	17.8	25.1	9.1	5.0	7.4	2.9	2.6	1.4	48.2	50.3
Aneby	Jönköping	89.9	4,485	23.9	16.2	21.1	12.8	4.0	14.5	3.4	2.3	1.7	46.4	51.8
Arboga	Västmanland	87.5	9,233	33.8	18.7	21.7	6.8	5.8	5.1	3.9	3.2	1.1	53.4	45.5
Arjeplog	Norrbotten	84.1	1,839	35.2	8.9	20.3	7.7	14.3	7.2	2.9	2.1	1.5	62.2	36.3
Arvidsjaur	Norrbotten	85.4	4,175	44.7	9.3	16.4	9.3	10.6	3.9	3.6	0.9	1.3	69.1	29.6
Arvika	Värmland	85.9	16,961	34.0	15.1	18.5	9.4	8.4	5.7	3.6	3.6	1.7	58.9	39.3
Askersund	Örebro	88.6	7,818	32.2	16.5	23.3	9.2	5.5	6.8	3.0	2.3	1.4	52.2	46.5
Avesta	Dalarna	86.7	14,573	34.8	15.8	24.7	6.8	6.5	5.0	2.9	2.2	1.3	53.2	45.5
Bengtsfors	Västra Götaland	85.4	6,013	31.8	14.3	25.9	9.3	5.3	7.4	2.6	2.3	1.1	51.3	47.6
Berg	Jämtland	85.6	4,610	32.0	15.3	19.7	16.9	6.3	4.6	1.7	2.2	1.4	59.1	39.5
Bjurholm	Västerbotten	84.9	1,587	29.2	17.9	18.7	14.7	5.0	7.6	5.0	1.5	0.4	55.4	44.2
Bjuv	Skåne	82.7	8,649	30.4	14.4	38.4	3.6	3.6	4.2	2.6	1.8	1.0	42.1	56.9
Boden	Norrbotten	88.0	19,110	41.8	14.3	17.8	6.2	8.1	4.6	3.6	2.2	1.4	61.9	36.7
Bollebygd	Västra Götaland	90.7	6,209	23.4	20.2	23.9	8.9	5.2	7.7	5.6	4.1	1.0	47.1	51.8
Bollnäs	Gävleborg	85.5	17,173	34.6	14.0	19.6	11.3	7.7	5.9	3.4	2.5	1.0	59.5	39.5
Borgholm	Kalmar	88.6	7,682	23.7	18.9	21.4	14.2	5.7	8.3	3.4	3.1	1.2	50.1	48.6
Borlänge	Dalarna	87.2	32,460	32.7	17.1	20.3	7.4	7.6	5.1	4.4	3.9	1.5	56.0	42.5
Borås	Västra Götaland	86.4	69,904	29.5	20.5	18.4	7.3	7.0	6.6	5.7	3.7	1.3	53.2	45.5
Botkyrka	Stockholm	78.2	45,393	32.3	18.5	16.1	5.2	9.9	8.1	4.4	3.9	1.7	55.6	42.7
Boxholm	Östergötland	89.1	3,705	37.7	15.0	19.7	9.6	4.9	5.8	2.7	2.5	2.1	57.4	40.5
Bromölla	Skåne	88.0	8,151	31.0	13.4	38.2	3.3	3.4	4.6	3.5	1.6	1.0	42.8	56.2
Bräcke	Jämtland	85.0	4,131	38.2	12.4	19.2	14.2	7.4	3.9	1.5	1.4	1.8	62.6	35.5
Burlöv	Skåne	80.8	10,010	32.4	19.4	23.9	5.0	6.2	3.6	4.7	3.4	1.4	51.8	46.8
Båstad	Skåne	88.9	10,362	16.4	28.5	21.5	11.4	3.3	8.5	5.4	4.0	1.1	40.4	58.5
Dals-Ed	Västra Götaland	85.6	2,936	24.1	16.3	27.0	12.7	3.0	10.4	2.9	2.2	1.5	44.9	53.7
Danderyd	Stockholm	91.9	21,897	8.0	41.6	10.3	11.3	2.4	10.1	11.2	3.8	1.3	36.6	62.0
Degerfors	Örebro	87.1	6,415	44.1	10.7	19.9	5.4	10.2	4.0	2.4	2.4	1.1	64.4	34.5
Dorotea	Västerbotten	84.6	1,720	43.8	6.2	12.3	14.9	10.6	4.9	3.6	1.2	2.5	74.1	23.4
Eda	Värmland	82.4	4,329	33.7	14.4	23.0	10.4	5.8	7.4	2.8	1.3	1.4	53.8	44.8
Ekerö	Stockholm	92.2	17,814	17.2	28.1	16.2	11.2	4.8	7.9	7.6	5.7	1.3	46.5	52.2
Eksjö	Jönköping	88.4	11,294	26.7	17.0	19.6	12.4	4.7	10.5	4.4	3.2	1.5	51.4	47.1
Emmaboda	Kalmar	87.0	5,919	33.5	14.4	22.3	11.4	5.8	6.1	2.5	2.4	1.6	55.6	42.8
Enköping	Uppsala	87.7	28,462	26.1	22.9	20.4	10.0	4.7	6.6	4.6	3.1	1.7	48.5	49.8
Eskilstuna	Södermanland	84.7	62,678	32.2	19.9	21.0	5.9	6.8	4.8	4.7	3.3	1.3	53.0	45.7
Eslöv	Skåne	86.3	20,665	27.5	17.6	28.0	7.3	5.2	4.8	4.4	3.3	2.0	47.6	50.4
Essunga	Västra Götaland	88.0	3,764	25.8	20.5	22.9	12.0	5.8	6.8	2.7	2.5	1.1	48.7	50.2
Fagersta	Västmanland	84.3	7,825	39.4	14.1	23.0	4.2	8.0	4.7	3.2	2.3	1.2	57.0	41.8
Falkenberg	Halland	87.7	29,472	30.2	18.8	17.6	12.3	5.1	7.0	4.3	3.4	1.3	55.3	43.3
Falköping	Västra Götaland	87.4	21,120	29.2	16.8	20.9	9.9	5.9	9.1	3.7	3.1	1.4	51.1	46.8
Falun	Dalarna	88.8	39,461	28.0	19.7	15.3	11.8	8.2	6.0	4.6	4.9	1.5	57.5	41.0
Filipstad	Värmland	83.6	6,392	41.2	12.0	25.6	4.9	7.2	4.2	2.4	1.4	1.2	57.0	41.8
Finspång	Östergötland	87.8	14,285	36.7	15.1	20.5	6.5	7.4	6.3	3.4	2.5	1.6	56.5	41.9
Flen	Södermanland	86.0	10,118	33.0	16.9	21.3	8.3	6.9	5.6	3.2	3.5	1.4	54.9	43.7
Forshaga	Värmland	88.8	7,600	39.0	13.3	20.5	7.9	6.5	6.2	2.8	2.5	1.4	58.7	39.9
Färgelanda	Västra Götaland	87.3	4,300	26.6	13.3	32.1	12.2	4.4	5.7	2.9	1.6	1.2	47.7	51.0
Gagnef	Dalarna	89.3	6,901	27.4	14.4	21.8	13.7	6.1	8.5	3.8	2.8	1.6	53.7	44.7
Gislaved	Jönköping	85.2	17,752	29.4	18.4	22.3	11.9	3.9	7.9	3.2	2.3	0.8	50.7	48.5
Gnesta	Södermanland	88.4	7,217	25.8	20.2	18.8	10.7	8.3	5.1	3.5	5.4	2.3	53.6	44.1
Gnosjö	Jönköping	86.0	5,855	26.3	18.5	21.8	9.8	2.8	15.0	3.2	1.8	0.8	44.0	55.2
Gothenburg	Västra Götaland	84.3	349,645	23.8	19.9	13.5	7.1	14.0	5.5	7.3	7.0	2.1	59.1	38.8
Gotland	Gotland	88.8	41,129	29.8	16.6	12.7	17.2	9.0	4.1	3.7	5.0	1.9	64.7	33.4
Grums	Värmland	86.0	5,876	41.2	12.8	23.2	7.0	5.5	4.7	2.2	1.7	1.8	57.6	40.6
Grästorp	Västra Götaland	88.9	3,952	25.7	21.1	23.2	12.9	3.2	7.2	3.5	2.1	1.2	47.4	51.5
Gullspång	Västra Götaland	86.1	3,389	35.5	13.9	23.9	8.6	5.9	5.4	2.5	2.2	2.2	54.6	43.2
Gällivare	Norrbotten	82.3	11,464	42.0	12.2	20.4	3.7	12.9	3.3	2.0	2.5	1.1	63.0	35.9
Gävle	Gävleborg	87.5	66,241	32.1	18.2	19.5	6.3	8.5	4.9	5.4	3.9	1.3	56.1	42.5
Götene	Västra Götaland	89.2	8,860	31.1	15.4	18.9	10.1	6.3	9.5	4.0	3.6	1.2	55.0	43.8
Habo	Jönköping	93.4	7,746	23.7	19.7	20.0	8.8	3.9	15.1	4.2	3.4	1.1	44.0	54.9
Hagfors	Värmland	84.1	7,607	47.5	9.3	18.0	7.9	8.3	4.5	2.3	1.3	1.0	67.3	31.8
Hallsberg	Örebro	88.6	10,200	36.9	13.8	21.7	7.9	6.6	5.9	3.2	2.6	1.4	57.1	41.4
Halmstad	Halland	87.4	65,498	30.4	21.3	17.7	8.2	5.5	6.2	5.3	3.7	1.6	53.2	45.2
Hallstahammar	Västmanland	85.8	10,063	36.2	14.7	23.3	5.3	8.0	5.1	4.0	2.2	1.4	55.6	43.0
Hammarö	Värmland	91.0	10,916	34.2	20.0	13.2	8.8	5.7	6.6	6.6	4.1	0.9	59.4	39.7
Haninge	Stockholm	85.1	50,484	27.2	22.9	19.9	6.1	8.0	5.4	5.1	3.7	1.6	50.2	48.2
Haparanda	Norrbotten	72.8	4,454	36.7	12.8	24.5	9.6	5.9	5.3	1.9	1.8	1.6	55.8	42.6
Heby	Uppsala	86.7	9,064	29.1	13.8	22.9	13.2	5.5	8.0	3.0	2.4	2.1	53.2	44.7
Hedemora	Dalarna	85.8	9,824	30.6	15.3	22.5	10.0	7.5	6.9	2.7	2.9	1.7	53.6	44.7
Helsingborg	Skåne	84.3	88,462	26.6	23.5	23.8	6.0	4.8	5.3	5.1	3.7	1.3	46.1	52.6
Herrljunga	Västra Götaland	88.9	6,362	24.8	16.8	21.8	12.4	6.0	8.8	4.9	2.8	1.7	50.8	47.4
Hjo	Västra Götaland	88.9	6,236	27.4	18.6	19.5	9.8	6.2	9.6	4.0	3.6	1.2	51.0	47.8
Hofors	Gävleborg	84.6	6,118	39.4	11.3	21.8	5.2	11.8	4.0	3.5	1.9	1.1	61.8	37.1
Huddinge	Stockholm	84.9	61,440	26.1	24.1	15.2	7.5	8.6	5.4	6.1	5.3	1.7	53.7	44.6
Hudiksvall	Gävleborg	85.6	24,699	34.7	13.8	16.3	12.6	9.3	5.3	2.8	3.6	1.6	63.0	35.4
Hultsfred	Kalmar	85.8	8,661	33.6	13.9	21.8	10.6	5.9	9.4	1.8	1.6	1.4	53.5	45.1
Hylte	Halland	85.0	6,056	31.2	14.4	25.8	11.7	4.0	6.6	3.3	1.9	1.2	52.0	46.8
Håbo	Uppsala	89.1	13,395	21.1	26.6	24.2	7.1	5.2	6.5	5.4	2.8	1.2	41.6	57.2
Hällefors	Örebro	84.1	4,289	39.7	11.9	24.7	6.0	9.0	3.4	2.1	1.8	1.4	58.7	39.9
Härjedalen	Jämtland	84.5	6,697	34.9	14.0	18.8	13.9	7.1	4.3	2.8	1.8	2.3	60.6	37.1
Härnösand	Västernorrland	87.3	16,284	36.7	13.1	16.8	9.9	8.9	5.3	3.2	4.3	1.8	63.0	35.2
Härryda	Västra Götaland	90.8	24,181	21.6	24.0	17.7	9.3	5.8	6.5	8.1	5.6	1.5	50.4	48.1
Hässleholm	Skåne	86.5	33,334	25.5	18.0	29.1	6.9	4.6	7.3	4.1	3.1	1.4	44.2	54.4
Höganäs	Skåne	88.9	17,613	20.4	27.3	20.5	8.6	3.4	7.5	6.7	4.5	1.2	43.5	55.3
Högsby	Kalmar	85.9	3,466	31.8	15.0	26.7	9.8	5.3	7.6	1.5	1.5	0.8	49.9	49.2
Hörby	Skåne	86.7	10,064	19.5	17.3	35.4	8.3	4.5	6.6	4.3	2.5	1.6	39.1	59.3
Höör	Skåne	88.1	10,737	19.3	18.9	28.2	7.8	6.2	6.4	5.5	5.6	2.1	44.4	53.5
Jokkmokk	Norrbotten	83.4	3,228	40.3	8.3	16.8	5.2	14.6	3.9	2.7	7.1	1.1	69.9	29.0
Järfälla	Stockholm	86.3	45,654	27.7	24.0	15.0	6.3	8.8	6.3	6.0	4.5	1.4	53.3	45.2
Jönköping	Jönköping	88.3	90,129	27.6	18.6	16.4	9.2	5.9	12.3	4.6	4.2	1.2	51.5	47.3
Kalix	Norrbotten	87.0	10,971	45.4	11.7	18.4	6.4	7.9	3.6	2.9	2.8	1.0	65.3	33.7
Kalmar	Kalmar	89.2	45,641	30.4	19.7	17.1	9.2	6.7	6.6	4.9	4.2	1.3	55.3	43.3
Karlsborg	Västra Götaland	90.6	4,856	28.4	16.1	22.5	10.7	5.1	8.6	5.3	2.2	1.2	51.7	47.1
Karlshamn	Blekinge	87.8	21,439	33.0	16.9	24.3	6.5	6.1	5.1	3.4	3.3	1.3	52.2	46.4
Karlskoga	Örebro	87.1	19,899	37.5	18.0	18.3	6.0	7.2	4.8	4.0	2.8	1.3	57.5	41.2
Karlskrona	Blekinge	89.9	44,317	31.2	18.4	21.6	7.2	5.6	6.2	5.2	3.4	1.0	52.5	46.1
Karlstad	Värmland	89.0	63,334	31.7	19.5	14.1	8.5	7.9	6.4	5.7	4.8	1.4	58.6	40.0
Katrineholm	Södermanland	86.7	21,583	37.3	17.4	17.8	8.0	6.0	5.3	3.8	3.3	1.2	58.4	40.4
Kil	Värmland	89.0	8,060	32.0	16.1	21.3	10.2	6.0	5.8	4.6	3.1	1.0	55.8	43.2
Kinda	Östergötland	89.1	6,664	27.5	16.9	20.6	12.2	5.9	8.0	3.6	3.8	1.6	52.9	45.5
Kiruna	Norrbotten	85.8	14,796	38.2	10.7	19.7	5.4	13.5	4.9	2.5	2.8	2.3	62.4	35.3
Klippan	Skåne	84.2	10,535	24.2	15.7	36.6	5.8	4.0	6.8	3.1	2.3	1.5	39.3	59.1
Knivsta	Uppsala	91.3	11,276	20.8	23.3	16.9	10.7	5.4	8.6	7.2	5.4	1.6	49.6	48.8
Kramfors	Västernorrland	86.2	12,066	41.1	9.3	15.8	12.5	11.8	4.0	2.1	1.9	1.7	69.2	29.1
Kristianstad	Skåne	86.3	53,957	26.2	21.8	26.5	5.9	4.1	5.6	6.2	2.8	1.1	45.1	53.8
Kristinehamn	Värmland	86.8	16,088	34.1	16.0	18.0	8.8	7.6	5.9	5.5	3.0	1.3	58.9	39.8
Krokom	Jämtland	88.5	9,391	31.1	14.1	15.6	18.7	8.3	5.6	2.3	3.1	1.1	63.6	35.3
Kumla	Örebro	88.6	13,948	32.6	16.9	21.1	7.1	5.6	8.0	5.0	2.7	1.2	52.9	45.9
Kungsbacka	Halland	91.8	56,049	16.3	30.6	19.3	9.8	3.7	7.8	7.6	3.7	1.2	41.0	57.7
Kungsör	Västmanland	88.3	5,370	31.4	16.7	23.9	8.6	5.9	5.6	4.4	2.1	1.5	52.3	46.2
Kungälv	Västra Götaland	90.6	30,254	25.1	22.2	18.6	8.7	6.2	7.7	6.1	4.3	1.3	50.3	48.4
Kävlinge	Skåne	91.1	20,396	22.6	25.7	25.0	7.7	2.8	5.2	6.4	3.3	1.3	42.8	55.9
Köping	Västmanland	85.9	16,390	34.6	15.6	23.9	6.7	6.4	5.9	3.3	2.3	1.2	53.4	45.4
Laholm	Halland	88.0	16,438	23.3	18.9	25.7	11.7	3.9	7.6	4.5	3.0	1.4	46.4	52.2
Landskrona	Skåne	83.5	26,783	32.1	17.6	25.4	4.5	5.1	6.7	4.1	3.2	1.3	51.6	47.1
Laxå	Örebro	86.8	3,665	35.5	12.0	24.2	6.4	6.9	9.4	2.8	1.6	1.2	53.2	45.6
Lekeberg	Örebro	90.8	5,293	25.9	15.7	23.9	13.2	5.3	8.7	3.0	2.7	1.7	50.1	48.3
Leksand	Dalarna	89.5	10,944	26.1	19.6	16.2	12.9	7.0	9.5	3.6	3.7	1.4	53.3	45.3
Lerum	Västra Götaland	91.3	27,360	22.5	23.5	17.0	8.6	6.6	7.4	7.5	5.7	1.3	50.8	47.9
Lessebo	Kronoberg	87.8	4,962	38.4	13.6	22.1	7.3	7.2	5.4	2.5	2.5	1.0	57.8	41.2
Lidingö	Stockholm	90.2	31,032	12.4	36.0	11.0	11.8	3.5	8.6	10.8	4.9	1.1	43.4	55.6
Lidköping	Västra Götaland	89.5	27,303	33.2	17.3	17.3	8.9	6.4	7.2	4.9	3.6	1.2	57.0	41.9
Lilla Edet	Västra Götaland	84.8	8,631	28.7	14.4	29.8	6.7	7.3	5.2	3.8	2.9	1.4	49.4	49.3
Lindesberg	Örebro	87.6	15,280	31.6	15.8	25.0	8.5	6.1	6.1	2.8	2.6	1.6	51.6	46.8
Linköping	Östergötland	89.2	105,664	27.6	22.2	13.2	9.7	6.4	6.5	7.2	5.6	1.7	56.4	41.9
Ljungby	Kronoberg	86.9	18,071	28.3	18.6	23.4	9.3	4.9	8.5	3.1	2.5	1.4	48.1	50.5
Ljusdal	Gävleborg	83.7	12,065	34.0	14.4	20.0	12.3	6.9	5.1	3.4	2.8	1.3	59.3	39.5
Ljusnarsberg	Örebro	83.7	3,000	33.8	11.3	31.2	6.0	7.0	4.2	2.7	1.9	1.9	51.3	46.7
Lomma	Skåne	93.9	16,401	16.7	33.2	17.1	9.3	2.5	6.4	10.0	3.8	1.0	42.4	56.6
Ludvika	Dalarna	87.1	16,868	35.4	14.1	23.2	6.6	8.3	4.5	3.5	2.9	1.6	56.6	41.8
Luleå	Norrbotten	89.0	53,182	39.0	15.4	13.4	7.5	10.5	4.8	4.4	3.6	1.6	64.9	33.5
Lund	Skåne	89.7	79,575	23.2	19.1	12.2	9.7	9.7	4.8	9.8	9.1	2.4	61.5	36.1
Lycksele	Västerbotten	84.5	7,787	38.9	14.4	13.8	7.3	9.5	9.7	3.8	1.4	1.2	60.9	37.9
Lysekil	Västra Götaland	87.5	9,885	32.4	15.6	21.8	7.1	6.6	5.5	5.4	4.3	1.3	55.8	42.9
Malmö	Skåne	82.0	193,298	29.1	19.5	16.8	5.7	11.9	3.8	5.6	5.6	2.0	57.9	40.1
Malung-Sälen	Dalarna	87.0	6,756	29.0	19.0	24.6	9.3	6.1	5.9	3.2	1.7	1.3	49.2	49.5
Malå	Västerbotten	85.0	1,961	43.0	9.0	14.4	8.0	14.2	5.6	3.9	1.0	0.9	70.1	29.0
Mariestad	Västra Götaland	87.5	16,409	33.0	19.9	17.6	8.3	6.0	7.3	3.7	3.1	1.2	54.0	44.8
Mark	Västra Götaland	88.0	22,770	29.1	16.0	19.8	10.7	7.3	7.1	5.5	3.3	1.3	55.8	42.9
Markaryd	Kronoberg	85.7	5,973	27.0	16.5	31.5	6.2	3.1	10.6	1.8	1.6	1.6	39.8	58.6
Mellerud	Västra Götaland	86.1	5,783	25.3	16.4	28.6	12.0	4.3	7.1	2.8	2.5	1.1	46.8	52.0
Mjölby	Östergötland	88.6	18,119	31.7	20.3	19.4	8.2	5.7	6.4	4.4	2.8	1.1	52.8	46.1
Mora	Dalarna	86.6	13,748	29.2	15.7	22.5	11.8	6.1	6.8	3.4	2.9	1.6	53.4	45.0
Motala	Östergötland	88.2	28,450	32.7	19.5	20.3	6.8	6.4	6.2	4.4	2.7	1.0	52.9	46.1
Mullsjö	Jönköping	89.6	4,823	25.3	14.1	22.1	7.0	5.4	17.9	2.6	4.0	1.6	44.3	54.1
Munkedal	Västra Götaland	86.2	6,674	26.2	16.8	27.4	9.2	6.2	7.2	3.1	2.4	1.4	47.2	51.4
Munkfors	Värmland	85.1	2,340	52.2	8.3	15.4	8.1	6.1	3.9	2.9	1.4	1.6	70.7	27.7
Mölndal	Västra Götaland	89.3	43,933	24.0	22.5	15.8	8.1	7.6	6.3	8.2	5.8	1.6	53.7	44.6
Mönsterås	Kalmar	89.3	8,911	31.9	13.8	26.3	10.0	5.3	6.5	3.1	2.1	1.1	52.4	46.6
Mörbylånga	Kalmar	91.7	10,367	27.1	18.5	20.6	11.2	5.9	7.3	3.9	4.0	1.4	52.2	46.4
Nacka	Stockholm	90.0	64,101	19.4	28.7	10.8	12.2	6.5	6.1	8.4	6.5	1.4	53.0	45.6
Nora	Örebro	86.9	6,922	33.7	14.7	21.4	8.9	6.3	6.3	3.6	3.4	1.7	55.9	42.4
Norberg	Västmanland	86.7	3,742	36.5	14.1	21.6	5.7	9.5	4.1	3.8	2.5	2.1	58.0	39.8
Nordanstig	Gävleborg	83.6	6,084	32.5	11.7	21.5	11.8	9.6	6.9	2.5	1.9	1.6	58.3	40.1
Nordmaling	Västerbotten	85.8	4,656	35.9	13.0	16.3	13.6	9.2	5.9	3.3	1.7	1.3	63.6	35.1
Norrköping	Östergötland	86.3	89,045	28.3	20.5	19.6	6.5	8.1	6.4	4.8	4.0	1.7	51.8	46.5
Norrtälje	Stockholm	87.1	41,174	26.2	22.2	19.9	9.6	6.2	5.9	4.7	3.8	1.4	50.5	48.0
Norsjö	Västerbotten	83.8	2,558	42.2	7.9	13.0	10.8	10.1	9.2	4.0	1.1	1.8	68.1	30.1
Nybro	Kalmar	86.6	12,697	32.8	14.8	22.7	10.2	5.9	7.5	2.9	1.8	1.4	53.6	45.0
Nykvarn	Stockholm	90.7	6,847	22.4	27.2	24.6	7.7	3.5	6.1	4.6	3.0	1.0	41.1	57.9
Nyköping	Södermanland	88.7	36,687	32.0	20.1	16.1	8.5	6.4	6.4	4.5	4.5	1.4	55.9	42.6
Nynäshamn	Stockholm	86.5	17,642	27.3	21.1	23.1	6.4	6.8	5.8	4.5	3.8	1.3	48.7	49.9
Nässjö	Jönköping	88.0	19,397	29.4	15.4	22.9	8.4	5.4	10.8	3.5	2.9	1.4	49.5	49.1
Ockelbo	Gävleborg	86.2	3,818	31.7	11.3	27.3	11.4	7.5	5.0	2.0	2.8	1.1	55.4	43.5
Olofström	Blekinge	85.0	8,337	36.6	12.0	28.9	6.5	5.7	4.9	2.3	1.9	1.2	53.0	45.8
Orsa	Dalarna	86.7	4,601	27.9	11.5	26.6	11.0	8.1	7.2	2.6	3.0	2.2	52.6	45.3
Orust	Västra Götaland	89.0	10,740	25.4	19.4	21.3	10.1	6.7	6.7	5.2	3.8	1.5	51.2	47.3
Osby	Skåne	87.0	8,385	28.2	16.1	31.2	7.3	3.9	7.3	2.4	2.3	1.3	44.1	54.6
Oskarshamn	Kalmar	88.1	17,870	32.3	18.2	22.2	6.0	5.9	8.2	4.7	1.7	0.9	50.6	48.6
Ovanåker	Gävleborg	86.2	7,645	32.3	12.5	17.8	17.0	4.8	10.1	2.7	1.8	1.1	58.6	40.4
Oxelösund	Södermanland	86.7	7,545	39.7	15.9	18.8	4.2	8.8	4.7	3.3	3.1	1.4	59.1	39.4
Pajala	Norrbotten	81.4	3,808	37.7	9.4	16.5	5.1	20.0	7.4	1.5	1.4	1.1	65.7	33.3
Partille	Västra Götaland	87.9	24,080	23.8	23.2	16.3	7.9	8.1	6.9	7.2	5.3	1.3	52.3	46.4
Perstorp	Skåne	82.0	4,126	29.3	16.0	35.3	5.0	3.3	5.3	2.4	2.0	1.3	42.1	56.6
Piteå	Norrbotten	89.8	29,523	47.5	11.8	11.8	7.5	10.6	4.8	2.5	2.4	1.1	70.5	28.4
Ragunda	Jämtland	85.4	3,446	37.5	7.9	20.9	14.8	9.2	4.0	1.7	1.5	2.5	64.7	32.8
Robertsfors	Västerbotten	87.1	4,489	37.9	10.5	10.9	18.5	10.3	5.0	2.4	2.7	1.6	71.9	26.5
Ronneby	Blekinge	87.7	18,634	29.9	16.2	29.4	7.1	5.5	5.2	3.2	2.1	1.3	47.8	50.9
Rättvik	Dalarna	87.2	7,644	26.7	16.8	23.4	12.2	6.1	7.1	3.1	3.0	1.6	51.1	47.3
Sala	Västmanland	88.2	14,958	29.3	16.0	22.2	11.8	6.3	6.0	4.1	2.6	1.6	54.1	44.3
Salem	Stockholm	87.8	9,985	23.1	24.8	16.9	7.6	6.0	8.0	7.6	4.5	1.6	48.7	49.7
Sandviken	Gävleborg	87.0	24,794	37.0	14.4	21.4	6.7	8.4	4.5	4.3	2.3	1.1	58.6	40.3
Sigtuna	Stockholm	83.0	25,576	25.5	24.7	19.3	6.7	6.4	7.6	4.9	3.5	1.6	46.9	51.5
Simrishamn	Skåne	86.7	13,243	23.4	20.5	25.0	8.2	5.8	6.0	4.6	4.6	2.0	46.5	51.5
Sjöbo	Skåne	86.6	12,418	19.1	18.2	39.2	7.1	3.3	6.2	2.9	2.4	1.6	34.8	63.6
Skara	Västra Götaland	87.7	12,250	30.4	19.4	20.2	8.4	6.0	6.9	3.6	3.6	1.5	52.1	46.5
Skellefteå	Västerbotten	87.9	48,964	45.3	12.0	11.7	8.8	9.8	4.9	3.4	3.0	1.2	70.3	28.5
Skinnskatteberg	Västmanland	85.4	2,865	38.5	10.7	25.2	6.7	6.6	3.9	4.9	2.0	1.5	58.6	39.9
Skurup	Skåne	88.2	10,054	22.6	20.6	33.3	7.2	4.3	4.4	3.8	2.6	1.2	40.5	58.3
Skövde	Västra Götaland	88.0	36,654	28.8	20.9	16.9	8.8	5.6	8.0	5.6	3.4	1.8	52.3	45.9
Smedjebacken	Dalarna	88.1	7,440	39.0	13.9	22.9	6.3	7.6	4.5	2.5	2.1	1.3	57.4	41.3
Sollefteå	Västernorrland	86.5	12,631	35.3	9.0	18.7	12.8	15.3	4.4	1.6	1.5	1.5	66.5	32.0
Sollentuna	Stockholm	88.6	43,676	20.9	28.1	11.2	10.2	6.5	7.5	9.0	5.3	1.4	51.7	46.8
Solna	Stockholm	87.4	50,510	24.0	23.7	11.3	9.0	9.9	5.8	8.1	6.4	1.8	57.4	40.8
Sorsele	Västerbotten	80.8	1,514	35.7	11.0	15.5	12.2	12.8	6.9	1.9	2.0	2.1	64.5	33.4
Sotenäs	Västra Götaland	88.2	6,592	24.9	24.7	20.5	7.9	4.8	8.1	5.3	2.7	1.1	45.5	53.4
Staffanstorp	Skåne	90.7	15,733	22.1	27.8	22.9	7.6	3.1	5.1	6.4	3.8	1.2	42.9	55.9
Stenungsund	Västra Götaland	89.9	17,509	26.0	23.8	19.3	7.3	5.4	6.8	6.2	4.1	1.1	48.9	49.9
Stockholm	Stockholm	87.3	611,206	23.8	21.9	9.8	9.1	13.1	4.9	7.9	7.7	1.9	61.5	36.6
Storfors	Värmland	87.1	2,622	40.7	10.7	22.5	8.4	6.9	5.3	2.9	1.2	1.4	60.0	38.6
Storuman	Västerbotten	83.2	3,800	34.4	12.1	17.0	11.0	10.9	7.9	3.5	2.1	1.3	61.7	36.9
Strängnäs	Södermanland	88.4	22,844	23.6	26.7	19.8	8.0	6.0	5.9	4.9	3.9	1.2	46.4	52.4
Strömstad	Västra Götaland	84.0	7,328	26.2	18.9	20.9	8.4	5.6	7.1	6.6	4.4	1.8	51.3	46.9
Strömsund	Jämtland	84.4	7,475	41.1	10.2	20.8	12.7	7.7	4.1	1.1	1.4	1.0	63.9	35.1
Sundbyberg	Stockholm	85.6	29,807	26.6	22.4	12.2	8.1	11.0	5.0	7.1	6.0	1.6	58.7	39.6
Sundsvall	Västernorrland	88.2	65,922	37.7	16.6	15.6	8.3	7.5	5.0	4.8	3.2	1.4	61.4	37.2
Sunne	Värmland	87.4	8,810	28.7	17.6	18.8	15.1	4.8	7.2	3.9	2.6	1.4	55.1	43.6
Surahammar	Västmanland	85.1	6,241	36.4	13.0	27.5	4.0	8.2	4.2	3.4	1.9	1.5	53.9	44.7
Svalöv	Skåne	87.7	8,533	23.0	15.1	34.3	9.3	4.6	5.1	3.7	2.6	2.2	43.3	54.5
Svedala	Skåne	90.9	13,735	21.9	22.6	31.5	6.0	3.2	5.3	5.4	3.0	1.3	39.4	59.3
Svenljunga	Västra Götaland	87.0	6,884	25.8	17.4	25.6	11.9	4.1	6.8	4.3	2.2	2.0	48.2	49.8
Säffle	Värmland	86.2	9,896	27.7	15.6	25.1	14.2	4.6	6.8	3.1	2.0	1.0	51.6	47.5
Säter	Dalarna	88.9	7,610	29.8	17.0	21.7	12.4	6.3	6.2	3.1	2.5	1.1	54.2	44.8
Sävsjö	Jönköping	87.5	7,028	22.1	16.4	25.6	9.9	3.2	17.9	2.4	1.7	0.9	39.1	59.9
Söderhamn	Gävleborg	86.1	16,776	36.5	14.4	19.6	9.9	8.3	5.0	2.9	2.4	1.0	60.1	39.0
Söderköping	Östergötland	89.9	9,955	22.4	21.7	21.9	10.9	5.5	7.8	5.0	3.5	1.3	47.3	51.4
Södertälje	Stockholm	77.5	48,273	27.2	19.8	17.5	5.9	7.7	11.2	4.5	4.5	1.8	49.7	48.5
Sölvesborg	Blekinge	88.3	11,930	27.8	19.1	31.2	5.7	3.7	6.1	3.2	2.1	1.2	42.4	56.4
Tanum	Västra Götaland	87.5	8,574	22.7	22.9	19.5	12.4	5.1	6.7	5.5	3.5	1.8	49.2	49.1
Tibro	Västra Götaland	88.1	7,176	31.2	16.3	21.1	8.3	4.6	9.7	5.6	2.3	1.0	52.0	47.1
Tidaholm	Västra Götaland	88.6	8,589	37.8	13.5	21.5	7.4	5.7	7.0	3.4	2.6	1.1	56.9	42.0
Tierp	Uppsala	87.5	13,802	33.9	13.8	20.9	11.3	6.6	5.4	3.1	2.7	2.2	57.7	40.1
Timrå	Västernorrland	87.5	12,032	43.1	11.9	19.4	6.8	8.0	5.0	3.1	1.9	0.9	62.8	36.3
Tingsryd	Kronoberg	86.7	7,881	27.3	15.7	27.1	11.7	4.8	8.4	1.8	2.0	1.3	47.6	51.1
Tjörn	Västra Götaland	90.4	11,259	20.6	21.6	20.8	7.7	5.1	12.3	6.9	3.8	1.3	44.0	54.7
Tomelilla	Skåne	86.2	8,617	23.2	17.7	33.2	9.5	4.3	4.7	3.0	2.9	1.6	42.8	55.6
Torsby	Värmland	83.7	7,509	35.5	13.9	21.4	11.2	6.5	5.2	3.1	1.9	1.3	58.1	40.5
Torsås	Kalmar	88.0	4,721	28.7	12.7	28.8	12.0	4.4	7.4	2.9	2.1	1.1	50.0	48.9
Tranemo	Västra Götaland	88.2	7,682	29.9	17.9	19.8	14.0	4.5	6.2	3.8	2.7	1.1	55.0	43.9
Tranås	Jönköping	88.5	12,279	31.7	16.7	19.5	9.2	5.4	9.2	4.0	3.1	1.4	53.3	45.3
Trelleborg	Skåne	86.4	28,451	24.9	21.5	30.7	5.7	3.9	5.2	4.5	2.5	1.1	41.5	57.4
Trollhättan	Västra Götaland	86.4	36,609	36.2	17.7	17.4	6.1	6.9	5.1	5.0	4.4	1.2	58.6	40.2
Trosa	Södermanland	90.5	8,864	23.4	27.2	18.8	9.2	5.3	6.3	4.7	4.1	1.1	46.7	52.2
Tyresö	Stockholm	90.3	30,260	23.9	25.8	16.3	7.9	6.4	5.8	6.9	5.4	1.6	50.5	47.9
Täby	Stockholm	91.1	46,386	14.0	36.0	11.4	11.0	3.2	8.3	10.7	4.1	1.3	43.0	55.7
Töreboda	Västra Götaland	87.0	5,938	30.5	17.3	23.1	10.9	4.6	6.6	3.1	2.0	1.9	51.1	47.0
Uddevalla	Västra Götaland	86.7	35,969	30.3	18.3	20.6	6.6	6.8	7.1	4.9	3.9	1.5	52.5	46.0
Ulricehamn	Västra Götaland	88.3	16,096	24.7	19.7	19.6	12.9	5.5	7.9	5.1	3.2	1.3	51.5	47.2
Umeå	Västerbotten	89.6	84,574	34.5	15.4	8.6	9.5	15.7	4.5	4.7	5.5	1.7	69.9	28.4
Upplands-Bro	Stockholm	86.8	16,366	26.2	23.2	20.1	6.0	6.6	7.5	5.4	3.3	1.7	47.5	50.8
Upplands Väsby	Stockholm	84.7	25,830	27.0	23.1	18.0	6.3	8.0	6.7	5.7	3.9	1.3	50.8	47.9
Uppsala	Uppsala	89.5	144,667	26.5	18.4	11.5	8.9	11.0	6.9	7.4	7.2	2.2	61.0	36.8
Uppvidinge	Kronoberg	86.8	5,735	28.8	14.6	26.2	11.9	5.9	7.3	2.2	1.7	1.3	50.5	48.2
Vadstena	Östergötland	89.2	5,327	29.1	22.5	16.9	9.3	5.9	7.3	3.7	3.9	1.4	51.9	46.7
Vaggeryd	Jönköping	88.0	8,813	29.3	15.3	20.4	10.4	4.2	13.1	3.6	2.6	1.2	50.1	48.7
Valdemarsvik	Östergötland	88.4	5,379	30.1	17.3	23.3	10.6	5.4	7.2	2.7	2.0	1.4	50.8	47.8
Vallentuna	Stockholm	90.0	20,952	18.9	28.3	16.6	10.1	4.5	7.6	7.7	4.9	1.4	46.1	52.5
Vansbro	Dalarna	86.2	4,501	29.4	13.3	20.8	14.6	7.2	9.7	2.1	1.2	1.6	54.5	43.8
Vara	Västra Götaland	87.4	10,505	24.9	21.5	23.7	11.8	4.9	6.6	3.4	1.9	1.3	46.9	51.7
Varberg	Halland	90.0	43,469	28.2	20.7	16.1	11.1	5.6	7.5	5.8	3.7	1.2	54.5	44.3
Vaxholm	Stockholm	92.7	8,106	16.4	30.3	13.1	13.3	4.7	7.9	7.8	5.5	1.1	47.6	51.3
Vellinge	Skåne	93.1	25,245	10.6	39.6	23.6	7.2	1.3	7.5	7.3	2.2	0.8	28.6	70.6
Vetlanda	Jönköping	88.2	17,711	27.8	16.9	22.1	10.9	3.9	11.6	3.5	2.1	1.1	48.3	50.7
Vilhelmina	Västerbotten	84.4	4,376	37.3	7.5	16.3	14.2	10.8	7.3	1.8	1.1	3.7	65.2	31.0
Vimmerby	Kalmar	88.2	10,358	30.4	16.3	20.3	13.5	5.6	8.3	2.0	2.3	1.4	53.8	44.8
Vindeln	Västerbotten	85.0	3,431	32.4	14.8	16.0	14.6	8.1	7.3	2.7	2.0	2.0	59.8	38.2
Vingåker	Södermanland	88.5	5,913	33.4	15.7	24.4	7.0	7.1	6.1	2.6	2.8	0.9	52.9	46.2
Vårgårda	Västra Götaland	89.4	7,598	24.9	14.0	20.6	12.4	5.6	12.4	4.3	3.6	1.3	50.8	47.9
Vänersborg	Västra Götaland	87.8	25,261	31.7	16.0	22.1	7.3	6.9	6.7	4.5	3.6	1.3	53.9	44.8
Vännäs	Västerbotten	86.6	5,615	34.6	12.7	13.2	13.1	13.1	6.0	3.1	2.8	1.4	66.7	31.9
Värmdö	Stockholm	90.3	28,115	20.5	27.5	17.2	9.8	6.0	5.9	6.4	5.4	1.4	48.1	50.6
Värnamo	Jönköping	87.7	22,268	28.5	18.1	18.4	12.6	3.8	11.6	3.6	2.5	1.0	50.9	48.0
Västervik	Kalmar	86.3	24,571	34.3	16.9	19.2	8.8	6.7	6.3	3.9	2.8	1.2	56.5	42.4
Västerås	Västmanland	86.9	96,032	29.1	22.2	17.5	6.3	7.2	6.2	6.8	3.4	1.3	52.8	45.9
Växjö	Kronoberg	89.3	59,550	30.0	21.4	15.4	9.2	7.2	7.2	4.4	4.2	1.1	54.9	43.9
Ydre	Östergötland	91.3	2,616	22.9	15.8	20.5	14.9	5.5	12.4	3.6	3.0	1.5	49.8	48.7
Ystad	Skåne	88.0	20,786	25.4	23.4	24.2	7.7	4.1	5.8	4.8	3.3	1.3	45.4	53.4
Åmål	Västra Götaland	84.8	7,909	34.9	13.8	23.2	7.5	6.7	5.9	3.4	3.1	1.5	55.7	42.9
Ånge	Västernorrland	85.6	6,280	41.9	11.3	22.1	8.6	6.8	4.9	1.6	1.1	1.8	59.9	38.3
Åre	Jämtland	88.6	7,297	26.2	15.4	13.2	21.6	8.3	4.8	2.7	6.2	1.7	64.9	33.4
Årjäng	Värmland	84.2	5,626	25.2	13.8	25.1	10.0	3.7	16.0	3.5	1.8	1.0	44.1	54.9
Åsele	Västerbotten	85.4	1,805	40.3	8.7	15.5	16.7	8.6	4.8	2.7	1.1	1.7	69.4	29.0
Åstorp	Skåne	82.4	8,719	29.2	17.3	34.5	4.7	3.9	4.7	3.0	1.7	1.2	42.4	56.4
Åtvidaberg	Östergötland	89.3	8,013	33.4	16.6	21.3	9.7	5.0	5.9	4.0	2.9	1.2	55.0	43.8
Älmhult	Kronoberg	87.7	10,067	29.6	18.7	21.3	11.1	4.8	7.1	3.4	3.0	1.1	51.9	47.1
Älvdalen	Dalarna	86.7	4,696	32.1	10.9	28.5	11.8	5.3	5.4	2.6	1.6	1.8	53.4	44.8
Älvkarleby	Uppsala	87.5	6,009	39.3	11.7	26.7	4.4	6.8	4.3	3.4	2.2	1.2	56.1	42.7
Älvsbyn	Norrbotten	85.4	5,306	44.8	8.6	16.6	9.0	10.7	4.6	3.0	1.2	1.4	68.8	29.8
Ängelholm	Skåne	87.4	28,134	22.3	25.3	24.2	8.1	3.7	7.4	4.7	3.2	1.2	42.0	56.9
Öckerö	Västra Götaland	91.8	9,170	18.7	21.9	17.5	5.4	4.9	19.4	6.6	4.6	0.9	40.2	58.9
Ödeshög	Östergötland	88.9	3,556	26.1	16.7	20.9	10.3	4.1	15.1	2.3	2.6	2.0	45.4	52.6
Örebro	Örebro	87.8	98,428	31.5	17.9	14.4	8.1	8.5	7.7	5.7	4.8	1.6	58.4	40.0
Örkelljunga	Skåne	85.3	6,192	20.8	15.4	35.5	6.7	2.9	12.1	2.7	2.3	1.5	35.4	63.1
Örnsköldsvik	Västernorrland	88.6	37,786	44.6	12.7	11.5	12.1	5.9	7.2	2.7	2.2	1.1	67.5	31.4
Östersund	Jämtland	87.9	42,176	33.3	15.6	13.3	14.2	9.1	5.1	3.7	4.4	1.3	64.7	34.0
Österåker	Stockholm	89.3	27,711	19.7	29.7	16.1	9.4	5.0	7.1	7.5	4.4	1.1	46.0	52.9
Östhammar	Uppsala	86.7	14,814	30.9	17.4	21.1	8.8	5.1	8.4	4.1	2.6	1.6	51.4	47.0
Östra Göinge	Skåne	86.6	8,747	27.6	18.1	33.3	5.9	3.8	5.8	2.4	2.1	0.9	41.8	57.3
Överkalix	Norrbotten	85.1	2,241	46.7	7.8	18.3	8.8	10.5	3.4	2.1	1.1	1.3	69.1	29.6
Övertorneå	Norrbotten	81.0	2,633	39.5	9.6	16.2	16.3	9.4	5.4	1.7	1.3	0.6	68.2	31.2
		87.2	6,476,725	28.2	19.8	17.5	8.6	8.0	6.3	5.5	4.4	1.5	54.8	43.7
Source: val.se

=== By blocs ===
This is divided between pre–2018 affiliations, 2018–2021 affiliations and those after the non-confidence vote of 2021.

Location	Region	Turnout	Votes	R-G	ALI	SD	Left/Lib	Con	Left/C	Right
Ale	Västra Götaland	87.9	19,330	39.5	36.8	22.3	51.3	47.3	46.5	52.1
Alingsås	Västra Götaland	89.8	27,571	39.9	43.4	15.3	56.4	42.2	49.7	48.9
Alvesta	Kronoberg	88.3	12,331	36.3	37.2	25.1	48.2	50.3	45.4	53.2
Aneby	Jönköping	89.9	4,485	30.3	46.9	21.1	46.4	51.8	43.1	55.2
Arboga	Västmanland	87.5	9,233	42.7	34.5	21.7	53.4	45.5	49.5	49.4
Arjeplog	Norrbotten	84.1	1,839	51.5	26.6	20.3	62.2	36.3	59.3	39.2
Arvidsjaur	Norrbotten	85.4	4,175	56.1	26.1	16.4	69.1	29.6	65.5	33.2
Arvika	Värmland	85.9	16,961	45.9	33.8	18.5	58.9	39.3	55.4	42.9
Askersund	Örebro	88.6	7,818	39.9	35.4	23.3	52.2	46.5	49.1	49.5
Avesta	Dalarna	86.7	14,573	43.5	30.5	24.7	53.2	45.5	50.3	48.4
Bengtsfors	Västra Götaland	85.4	6,013	39.4	33.6	25.9	51.3	47.6	48.7	50.2
Berg	Jämtland	85.6	4,610	40.5	38.4	19.7	59.1	39.5	57.4	41.1
Bjurholm	Västerbotten	84.9	1,587	35.7	45.2	18.7	55.4	44.2	50.4	49.1
Bjuv	Skåne	82.7	8,649	35.8	24.8	38.4	42.1	56.9	39.4	59.5
Boden	Norrbotten	88.0	19,110	52.1	28.8	17.8	61.9	36.7	58.3	40.3
Bollebygd	Västra Götaland	90.7	6,209	32.6	42.4	23.9	47.1	51.8	41.5	57.4
Bollnäs	Gävleborg	85.5	17,173	44.8	34.6	19.6	59.5	39.5	56.1	42.9
Borgholm	Kalmar	88.6	7,682	32.5	44.9	21.4	50.1	48.6	46.7	52.1
Borlänge	Dalarna	87.2	32,460	44.2	34.0	20.3	56.0	42.5	51.6	46.9
Borås	Västra Götaland	86.4	69,904	40.2	40.1	18.4	53.2	45.5	47.5	51.2
Botkyrka	Stockholm	78.2	45,393	46.0	36.2	16.1	55.6	42.7	51.2	47.1
Boxholm	Östergötland	89.1	3,705	45.1	33.1	19.7	57.4	40.5	54.7	43.2
Bromölla	Skåne	88.0	8,151	36.0	24.7	38.2	42.8	56.2	39.3	59.6
Bräcke	Jämtland	85.0	4,131	47.0	32.0	19.2	62.6	35.5	61.2	37.0
Burlöv	Skåne	80.8	10,010	42.0	32.7	23.9	51.8	46.8	47.0	51.5
Båstad	Skåne	88.9	10,362	23.6	53.8	21.5	40.4	58.5	35.0	63.9
Dals-Ed	Västra Götaland	85.6	2,936	29.3	42.2	27.0	44.9	53.7	42.0	56.6
Danderyd	Stockholm	91.9	21,897	14.2	74.2	10.3	36.6	62.0	25.4	73.2
Degerfors	Örebro	87.1	6,415	56.6	22.4	19.9	64.4	34.5	62.0	36.9
Dorotea	Västerbotten	84.6	1,720	55.6	29.5	12.3	74.1	23.4	70.5	27.0
Eda	Värmland	82.4	4,329	40.7	34.9	23.0	53.8	44.8	51.1	47.6
Ekerö	Stockholm	92.2	17,814	27.6	54.9	16.2	46.5	52.2	38.9	59.8
Eksjö	Jönköping	88.4	11,294	34.6	44.3	19.6	51.4	47.1	47.0	51.5
Emmaboda	Kalmar	87.0	5,919	41.7	34.4	22.3	55.6	42.8	53.2	45.3
Enköping	Uppsala	87.7	28,462	33.9	44.1	20.4	48.5	49.8	43.9	54.4
Eskilstuna	Södermanland	84.7	62,678	42.3	35.4	21.0	53.0	45.7	48.3	50.5
Eslöv	Skåne	86.3	20,665	35.9	34.1	28.0	47.6	50.4	43.2	54.8
Essunga	Västra Götaland	88.0	3,764	34.0	42.0	22.9	48.7	50.2	46.0	52.8
Fagersta	Västmanland	84.3	7,825	49.6	26.1	23.0	57.0	41.8	53.8	45.0
Falkenberg	Halland	87.7	29,472	38.7	42.4	17.6	55.3	43.3	51.0	47.6
Falköping	Västra Götaland	87.4	21,120	38.2	39.5	20.9	51.1	46.8	48.1	50.4
Falun	Dalarna	88.8	39,461	41.1	42.1	15.3	57.5	41.0	52.9	45.6
Filipstad	Värmland	83.6	6,392	49.8	23.5	25.6	57.0	41.8	54.6	44.2
Finspång	Östergötland	87.8	14,285	46.6	31.3	20.5	56.5	41.9	53.0	45.3
Flen	Södermanland	86.0	10,118	43.4	33.9	21.3	54.9	43.7	51.7	46.9
Forshaga	Värmland	88.8	7,600	48.0	30.1	20.5	58.7	39.9	55.9	42.7
Färgelanda	Västra Götaland	87.3	4,300	32.7	34.1	32.1	47.7	51.0	44.8	54.0
Gagnef	Dalarna	89.3	6,901	36.3	40.4	21.8	53.7	44.7	50.0	48.4
Gislaved	Jönköping	85.2	17,752	35.6	41.3	22.3	50.7	48.5	47.5	51.7
Gnesta	Södermanland	88.4	7,217	39.4	39.5	18.8	53.6	44.1	50.2	47.6
Gnosjö	Jönköping	86.0	5,855	31.0	46.4	21.8	44.0	55.2	40.8	58.4
Gothenburg	Västra Götaland	84.3	349,645	44.7	39.7	13.5	59.1	38.8	51.8	46.1
Gotland	Gotland	88.8	41,129	43.8	41.7	12.7	64.7	33.4	61.0	37.2
Grums	Värmland	86.0	5,876	48.4	26.6	23.2	57.6	40.6	55.4	42.8
Grästorp	Västra Götaland	88.9	3,952	30.9	44.7	23.2	47.4	51.5	43.8	55.0
Gullspång	Västra Götaland	86.1	3,389	43.6	30.4	23.9	54.6	43.2	52.2	45.6
Gällivare	Norrbotten	82.3	11,464	57.3	21.2	20.4	63.0	35.9	61.0	38.0
Gävle	Gävleborg	87.5	66,241	44.8	34.8	19.5	56.1	42.5	50.8	47.9
Götene	Västra Götaland	89.2	8,860	40.9	39.0	18.9	55.0	43.8	51.0	47.8
Habo	Jönköping	93.4	7,746	31.0	47.8	20.0	44.0	54.9	39.8	59.1
Hagfors	Värmland	84.1	7,607	57.1	24.0	18.0	67.3	31.8	64.9	34.1
Hallsberg	Örebro	88.6	10,200	46.0	30.8	21.7	57.1	41.4	54.0	44.6
Halmstad	Halland	87.4	65,498	39.6	41.1	17.7	53.2	45.2	47.9	50.5
Hallstahammar	Västmanland	85.8	10,063	46.3	29.0	23.3	55.6	43.0	51.6	47.0
Hammarö	Värmland	91.0	10,916	44.0	41.9	13.2	59.4	39.7	52.8	46.3
Haninge	Stockholm	85.1	50,484	39.0	39.5	19.9	50.2	48.2	45.1	53.3
Haparanda	Norrbotten	72.8	4,454	44.4	29.6	24.5	55.8	42.6	54.0	44.4
Heby	Uppsala	86.7	9,064	37.0	38.0	22.9	53.2	44.7	50.2	47.7
Hedemora	Dalarna	85.8	9,824	40.9	34.8	22.5	53.6	44.7	50.9	47.4
Helsingborg	Skåne	84.3	88,462	35.0	39.9	23.8	46.1	52.6	41.0	57.7
Herrljunga	Västra Götaland	88.9	6,362	33.6	42.8	21.8	50.8	47.4	46.0	52.3
Hjo	Västra Götaland	88.9	6,236	37.2	42.1	19.5	51.0	47.8	47.0	51.8
Hofors	Gävleborg	84.6	6,118	53.0	24.0	21.8	61.8	37.1	58.3	40.6
Huddinge	Stockholm	84.9	61,440	40.1	43.1	15.2	53.7	44.6	47.6	50.7
Hudiksvall	Gävleborg	85.6	24,699	47.6	34.5	16.3	63.0	35.4	60.2	38.2
Hultsfred	Kalmar	85.8	8,661	41.1	35.7	21.8	53.5	45.1	51.7	46.9
Hylte	Halland	85.0	6,056	37.1	35.9	25.8	52.0	46.8	48.7	50.1
Håbo	Uppsala	89.1	13,395	29.1	45.5	24.2	41.6	57.2	36.2	62.6
Hällefors	Örebro	84.1	4,289	50.5	23.4	24.7	58.7	39.9	56.6	42.0
Härjedalen	Jämtland	84.5	6,697	43.9	35.0	18.8	60.6	37.1	57.8	39.8
Härnösand	Västernorrland	87.3	16,284	49.8	31.5	16.8	63.0	35.2	59.8	38.4
Härryda	Västra Götaland	90.8	24,181	32.9	47.9	17.7	50.4	48.1	42.2	56.3
Hässleholm	Skåne	86.5	33,334	33.2	36.3	29.1	44.2	54.4	40.1	58.6
Höganäs	Skåne	88.9	17,613	28.2	50.1	20.5	43.5	55.3	36.8	61.9
Högsby	Kalmar	85.9	3,466	38.6	33.8	26.7	49.9	49.2	48.4	50.8
Hörby	Skåne	86.7	10,064	26.5	36.5	35.4	39.1	59.3	34.8	63.6
Höör	Skåne	88.1	10,737	31.1	38.6	28.2	44.4	53.5	38.9	59.0
Jokkmokk	Norrbotten	83.4	3,228	62.0	20.1	16.8	69.9	29.0	67.2	31.7
Järfälla	Stockholm	86.3	45,654	41.0	42.6	15.0	53.3	45.2	47.3	51.3
Jönköping	Jönköping	88.3	90,129	37.7	44.7	16.4	51.5	47.3	46.9	51.9
Kalix	Norrbotten	87.0	10,971	56.0	24.6	18.4	65.3	33.7	62.5	36.5
Kalmar	Kalmar	89.2	45,641	41.2	40.4	17.1	55.3	43.3	50.4	48.3
Karlsborg	Västra Götaland	90.6	4,856	35.7	40.7	22.5	51.7	47.1	46.4	52.5
Karlshamn	Blekinge	87.8	21,439	42.4	31.9	24.3	52.2	46.4	49.0	49.8
Karlskoga	Örebro	87.1	19,899	47.5	32.8	18.3	57.5	41.2	53.5	45.1
Karlskrona	Blekinge	89.9	44,317	40.2	36.9	21.6	52.5	46.1	47.3	51.3
Karlstad	Värmland	89.0	63,334	44.5	40.0	14.1	58.6	40.0	52.9	45.6
Katrineholm	Södermanland	86.7	21,583	46.6	34.5	17.8	58.4	40.4	54.6	44.2
Kil	Värmland	89.0	8,060	41.1	36.7	21.3	55.8	43.2	51.3	47.8
Kinda	Östergötland	89.1	6,664	37.2	40.6	20.6	52.9	45.5	49.4	49.0
Kiruna	Norrbotten	85.8	14,796	54.5	23.5	19.7	62.4	35.3	59.9	37.9
Klippan	Skåne	84.2	10,535	30.4	31.4	36.6	39.3	59.1	36.3	62.2
Knivsta	Uppsala	91.3	11,276	31.7	49.8	16.9	49.6	48.8	42.4	56.0
Kramfors	Västernorrland	86.2	12,066	54.7	27.8	15.8	69.2	29.1	67.2	31.1
Kristianstad	Skåne	86.3	53,957	33.1	39.4	26.5	45.1	53.8	39.0	60.0
Kristinehamn	Värmland	86.8	16,088	44.7	36.1	18.0	58.9	39.8	53.4	45.3
Krokom	Jämtland	88.5	9,391	42.5	40.8	15.6	63.6	35.3	61.2	37.6
Kumla	Örebro	88.6	13,948	40.9	36.9	21.1	52.9	45.9	47.9	50.9
Kungsbacka	Halland	91.8	56,049	23.7	55.8	19.3	41.0	57.7	33.4	65.3
Kungsör	Västmanland	88.3	5,370	39.4	35.2	23.9	52.3	46.2	47.9	50.6
Kungälv	Västra Götaland	90.6	30,254	35.6	44.6	18.6	50.3	48.4	44.3	54.5
Kävlinge	Skåne	91.1	20,396	28.8	44.9	25.0	42.8	55.9	36.4	62.2
Köping	Västmanland	85.9	16,390	43.3	31.6	23.9	53.4	45.4	50.0	48.8
Laholm	Halland	88.0	16,438	30.2	42.7	25.7	46.4	52.2	42.0	56.6
Landskrona	Skåne	83.5	26,783	40.2	32.9	25.4	51.6	47.1	44.9	53.8
Laxå	Örebro	86.8	3,665	44.0	30.7	24.2	53.2	45.6	50.4	48.4
Lekeberg	Örebro	90.8	5,293	33.9	40.6	23.9	50.1	48.3	47.0	51.3
Leksand	Dalarna	89.5	10,944	36.8	45.5	16.2	53.3	45.3	49.7	48.9
Lerum	Västra Götaland	91.3	27,360	34.8	46.9	17.0	50.8	47.9	43.4	55.4
Lessebo	Kronoberg	87.8	4,962	48.0	28.9	22.1	57.8	41.2	55.2	43.7
Lidingö	Stockholm	90.2	31,032	20.8	67.2	11.0	43.4	55.6	32.6	66.4
Lidköping	Västra Götaland	89.5	27,303	43.2	38.4	17.3	57.0	41.9	52.1	46.8
Lilla Edet	Västra Götaland	84.8	8,631	38.9	30.0	29.8	49.4	49.3	45.6	53.0
Lindesberg	Örebro	87.6	15,280	40.2	33.1	25.0	51.6	46.8	48.7	49.7
Linköping	Östergötland	89.2	105,664	39.6	45.5	13.2	56.4	41.9	49.3	49.0
Ljungby	Kronoberg	86.9	18,071	35.7	39.5	23.4	48.1	50.5	45.0	52.4
Ljusdal	Gävleborg	83.7	12,065	43.6	35.1	20.0	59.3	39.5	55.9	42.8
Ljusnarsberg	Örebro	83.7	3,000	42.7	24.2	31.2	51.3	46.7	48.7	49.4
Lomma	Skåne	93.9	16,401	23.1	58.8	17.1	42.4	56.6	32.4	66.6
Ludvika	Dalarna	87.1	16,868	46.6	28.7	23.2	56.6	41.8	53.1	45.3
Luleå	Norrbotten	89.0	53,182	53.0	32.1	13.4	64.9	33.5	60.5	37.9
Lund	Skåne	89.7	79,575	42.0	43.3	12.2	61.5	36.1	51.8	45.9
Lycksele	Västerbotten	84.5	7,787	49.8	35.2	13.8	60.9	37.9	57.1	41.7
Lysekil	Västra Götaland	87.5	9,885	43.3	33.6	21.8	55.8	42.9	50.3	48.3
Malmö	Skåne	82.0	193,298	46.6	34.6	16.8	57.9	40.1	52.3	45.7
Malung-Sälen	Dalarna	87.0	6,756	36.8	37.3	24.6	49.2	49.5	46.1	52.6
Malå	Västerbotten	85.0	1,961	58.2	26.5	14.4	70.1	29.0	66.2	32.9
Mariestad	Västra Götaland	87.5	16,409	42.1	39.2	17.6	54.0	44.8	50.3	48.5
Mark	Västra Götaland	88.0	22,770	39.7	39.2	19.8	55.8	42.9	50.3	48.3
Markaryd	Kronoberg	85.7	5,973	31.7	35.1	31.5	39.8	58.6	38.0	60.4
Mellerud	Västra Götaland	86.1	5,783	32.1	38.2	28.6	46.8	52.0	44.1	54.8
Mjölby	Östergötland	88.6	18,119	40.2	39.3	19.4	52.8	46.1	48.4	50.5
Mora	Dalarna	86.6	13,748	38.2	37.7	22.5	53.4	45.0	50.0	48.4
Motala	Östergötland	88.2	28,450	41.7	37.0	20.3	52.9	46.1	48.5	50.5
Mullsjö	Jönköping	89.6	4,823	34.7	41.7	22.1	44.3	54.1	41.7	56.7
Munkedal	Västra Götaland	86.2	6,674	34.8	36.3	27.4	47.2	51.4	44.0	54.6
Munkfors	Värmland	85.1	2,340	59.7	23.3	15.4	70.7	27.7	67.8	30.6
Mölndal	Västra Götaland	89.3	43,933	37.4	45.1	15.8	53.7	44.6	45.5	52.9
Mönsterås	Kalmar	89.3	8,911	39.3	33.4	26.3	52.4	46.6	49.3	49.7
Mörbylånga	Kalmar	91.7	10,367	37.4	41.0	20.6	52.2	46.4	48.3	50.4
Nacka	Stockholm	90.0	64,101	32.5	55.4	10.8	53.0	45.6	44.6	54.0
Nora	Örebro	86.9	6,922	43.4	33.5	21.4	55.9	42.4	52.3	46.0
Norberg	Västmanland	86.7	3,742	48.6	27.7	21.6	58.0	39.8	54.3	43.6
Nordanstig	Gävleborg	83.6	6,084	44.1	32.9	21.5	58.3	40.1	55.9	42.6
Nordmaling	Västerbotten	85.8	4,656	46.8	35.7	16.3	63.6	35.1	60.3	38.4
Norrköping	Östergötland	86.3	89,045	40.5	38.2	19.6	51.8	46.5	47.0	51.3
Norrtälje	Stockholm	87.1	41,174	36.2	42.5	19.9	50.5	48.0	45.8	52.8
Norsjö	Västerbotten	83.8	2,558	53.3	31.9	13.0	68.1	30.1	64.1	34.1
Nybro	Kalmar	86.6	12,697	40.5	35.4	22.7	53.6	45.0	50.7	47.9
Nykvarn	Stockholm	90.7	6,847	28.9	45.5	24.6	41.1	57.9	36.6	62.4
Nyköping	Södermanland	88.7	36,687	42.9	39.6	16.1	55.9	42.6	51.4	47.1
Nynäshamn	Stockholm	86.5	17,642	37.8	37.8	23.1	48.7	49.9	44.2	54.4
Nässjö	Jönköping	88.0	19,397	37.6	38.1	22.9	49.5	49.1	46.1	52.6
Ockelbo	Gävleborg	86.2	3,818	42.1	29.6	27.3	55.4	43.5	53.5	45.5
Olofström	Blekinge	85.0	8,337	44.2	25.7	28.9	53.0	45.8	50.7	48.1
Orsa	Dalarna	86.7	4,601	39.0	32.3	26.6	52.6	45.3	49.9	47.9
Orust	Västra Götaland	89.0	10,740	35.9	41.4	21.3	51.2	47.3	46.0	52.5
Osby	Skåne	87.0	8,385	34.4	33.2	31.2	44.1	54.6	41.7	57.0
Oskarshamn	Kalmar	88.1	17,870	39.9	37.1	22.2	50.6	48.6	45.9	53.3
Ovanåker	Gävleborg	86.2	7,645	38.9	42.2	17.8	58.6	40.4	55.9	43.1
Oxelösund	Södermanland	86.7	7,545	51.6	28.2	18.8	59.1	39.4	55.8	42.7
Pajala	Norrbotten	81.4	3,808	59.1	23.4	16.5	65.7	33.3	64.2	34.8
Partille	Västra Götaland	87.9	24,080	37.2	45.2	16.3	52.3	46.4	45.1	53.6
Perstorp	Skåne	82.0	4,126	34.6	28.8	35.3	42.1	56.6	39.7	59.0
Piteå	Norrbotten	89.8	29,523	60.5	26.6	11.8	70.5	28.4	67.9	30.9
Ragunda	Jämtland	85.4	3,446	48.3	28.3	20.9	64.7	32.8	63.1	34.4
Robertsfors	Västerbotten	87.1	4,489	51.0	36.5	10.9	71.9	26.5	69.5	28.9
Ronneby	Blekinge	87.7	18,634	37.6	31.7	29.4	47.8	50.9	44.6	54.1
Rättvik	Dalarna	87.2	7,644	35.8	39.3	23.4	51.1	47.3	48.0	50.4
Sala	Västmanland	88.2	14,958	38.2	37.9	22.2	54.1	44.3	50.0	48.4
Salem	Stockholm	87.8	9,985	33.5	48.0	16.9	48.7	49.7	41.1	57.3
Sandviken	Gävleborg	87.0	24,794	47.6	29.8	21.4	58.6	40.3	54.3	44.6
Sigtuna	Stockholm	83.0	25,576	35.3	43.8	19.3	46.9	51.5	42.0	56.4
Simrishamn	Skåne	86.7	13,243	33.7	39.2	25.0	46.5	51.5	41.9	56.1
Sjöbo	Skåne	86.6	12,418	24.8	34.4	39.2	34.8	63.6	31.9	66.5
Skara	Västra Götaland	87.7	12,250	40.0	38.3	20.2	52.1	46.5	48.4	50.1
Skellefteå	Västerbotten	87.9	48,964	58.1	29.0	11.7	70.3	28.5	66.9	31.9
Skinnskatteberg	Västmanland	85.4	2,865	47.1	26.2	25.2	58.6	39.9	53.7	44.8
Skurup	Skåne	88.2	10,054	29.5	36.0	33.3	40.5	58.3	36.7	62.1
Skövde	Västra Götaland	88.0	36,654	37.8	43.4	16.9	52.3	45.9	46.6	51.5
Smedjebacken	Dalarna	88.1	7,440	48.2	27.2	22.9	57.4	41.3	55.0	43.8
Sollefteå	Västernorrland	86.5	12,631	52.1	27.8	18.7	66.5	32.0	64.9	33.6
Sollentuna	Stockholm	88.6	43,676	32.6	54.8	11.2	51.7	46.8	42.8	55.8
Solna	Stockholm	87.4	50,510	40.2	46.7	11.3	57.4	40.8	49.3	48.9
Sorsele	Västerbotten	80.8	1,514	50.4	32.0	15.5	64.5	33.4	62.6	35.3
Sotenäs	Västra Götaland	88.2	6,592	32.3	46.1	20.5	45.5	53.4	40.2	58.7
Staffanstorp	Skåne	90.7	15,733	28.9	46.9	22.9	42.9	55.9	36.5	62.3
Stenungsund	Västra Götaland	89.9	17,509	35.4	44.2	19.3	48.9	49.9	42.7	56.2
Stockholm	Stockholm	87.3	611,206	44.6	43.7	9.8	61.5	36.6	53.7	44.4
Storfors	Värmland	87.1	2,622	48.8	27.3	22.5	60.0	38.6	57.1	41.4
Storuman	Västerbotten	83.2	3,800	47.3	34.4	17.0	61.7	36.9	58.3	40.4
Strängnäs	Södermanland	88.4	22,844	33.4	45.6	19.8	46.4	52.4	41.5	57.3
Strömstad	Västra Götaland	84.0	7,328	36.3	41.0	20.9	51.3	46.9	44.7	53.5
Strömsund	Jämtland	84.4	7,475	50.2	28.1	20.8	63.9	35.1	62.9	36.2
Sundbyberg	Stockholm	85.6	29,807	43.6	42.5	12.2	58.7	39.6	51.7	46.7
Sundsvall	Västernorrland	88.2	65,922	48.3	34.6	15.6	61.4	37.2	56.6	42.0
Sunne	Värmland	87.4	8,810	36.0	43.8	18.8	55.1	43.6	51.1	47.5
Surahammar	Västmanland	85.1	6,241	46.5	24.5	27.5	53.9	44.7	50.5	48.0
Svalöv	Skåne	87.7	8,533	30.3	33.2	34.3	43.3	54.5	39.6	58.2
Svedala	Skåne	90.9	13,735	28.0	39.2	31.5	39.4	59.3	34.0	64.7
Svenljunga	Västra Götaland	87.0	6,884	32.0	40.4	25.6	48.2	49.8	44.0	54.0
Säffle	Värmland	86.2	9,896	34.3	39.7	25.1	51.6	47.5	48.5	50.5
Säter	Dalarna	88.9	7,610	38.6	38.7	21.7	54.2	44.8	51.0	47.9
Sävsjö	Jönköping	87.5	7,028	26.9	46.6	25.6	39.1	59.9	36.8	62.3
Söderhamn	Gävleborg	86.1	16,776	47.2	32.3	19.6	60.1	39.0	57.1	41.9
Söderköping	Östergötland	89.9	9,955	31.4	45.4	21.9	47.3	51.4	42.4	56.4
Södertälje	Stockholm	77.5	48,273	39.4	41.3	17.5	49.7	48.5	45.3	52.9
Sölvesborg	Blekinge	88.3	11,930	33.6	34.0	31.2	42.4	56.4	39.3	59.6
Tanum	Västra Götaland	87.5	8,574	31.3	47.5	19.5	49.2	49.1	43.7	54.5
Tibro	Västra Götaland	88.1	7,176	38.1	39.8	21.1	52.0	47.1	46.4	52.3
Tidaholm	Västra Götaland	88.6	8,589	46.0	31.3	21.5	56.9	42.0	53.4	45.4
Tierp	Uppsala	87.5	13,802	43.2	33.7	20.9	57.7	40.1	54.6	43.3
Timrå	Västernorrland	87.5	12,032	53.0	26.7	19.4	62.8	36.3	59.8	39.3
Tingsryd	Kronoberg	86.7	7,881	34.1	37.4	27.1	47.6	51.1	45.8	52.9
Tjörn	Västra Götaland	90.4	11,259	29.5	48.5	20.8	44.0	54.7	37.1	61.6
Tomelilla	Skåne	86.2	8,617	30.4	34.8	33.2	42.8	55.6	39.8	58.5
Torsby	Värmland	83.7	7,509	43.9	33.4	21.4	58.1	40.5	55.1	43.6
Torsås	Kalmar	88.0	4,721	35.2	35.0	28.8	50.0	48.9	47.2	51.7
Tranemo	Västra Götaland	88.2	7,682	37.2	42.0	19.8	55.0	43.9	51.2	47.7
Tranås	Jönköping	88.5	12,279	40.1	39.0	19.5	53.3	45.3	49.3	49.3
Trelleborg	Skåne	86.4	28,451	31.3	36.9	30.7	41.5	57.4	37.0	61.9
Trollhättan	Västra Götaland	86.4	36,609	47.5	33.9	17.4	58.6	40.2	53.6	45.2
Trosa	Södermanland	90.5	8,864	32.8	47.3	18.8	46.7	52.2	42.0	56.9
Tyresö	Stockholm	90.3	30,260	35.7	46.5	16.3	50.5	47.9	43.6	54.9
Täby	Stockholm	91.1	46,386	21.3	66.0	11.4	43.0	55.7	32.3	66.4
Töreboda	Västra Götaland	87.0	5,938	37.2	37.9	23.1	51.1	47.0	48.0	50.1
Uddevalla	Västra Götaland	86.7	35,969	41.0	36.9	20.6	52.5	46.0	47.6	50.9
Ulricehamn	Västra Götaland	88.3	16,096	33.5	45.6	19.6	51.5	47.2	46.4	52.3
Umeå	Västerbotten	89.6	84,574	55.7	33.8	8.6	69.9	28.4	65.2	33.1
Upplands-Bro	Stockholm	86.8	16,366	36.1	42.1	20.1	47.5	50.8	42.1	56.2
Upplands Väsby	Stockholm	84.7	25,830	38.9	41.8	18.0	50.8	47.9	45.2	53.5
Uppsala	Uppsala	89.5	144,667	44.7	41.7	11.5	61.0	36.8	53.6	44.2
Uppvidinge	Kronoberg	86.8	5,735	36.4	36.0	26.2	50.5	48.2	48.3	50.4
Vadstena	Östergötland	89.2	5,327	38.9	42.9	16.9	51.9	46.7	48.2	50.5
Vaggeryd	Jönköping	88.0	8,813	36.1	42.2	20.4	50.1	48.7	46.5	52.3
Valdemarsvik	Östergötland	88.4	5,379	37.5	37.8	23.3	50.8	47.8	48.1	50.5
Vallentuna	Stockholm	90.0	20,952	28.2	53.7	16.6	46.1	52.5	38.3	60.2
Vansbro	Dalarna	86.2	4,501	37.8	39.7	20.8	54.5	43.8	52.4	45.9
Vara	Västra Götaland	87.4	10,505	31.7	43.3	23.7	46.9	51.7	43.5	55.2
Varberg	Halland	90.0	43,469	37.6	45.1	16.1	54.5	44.3	48.7	50.1
Vaxholm	Stockholm	92.7	8,106	26.6	51.3	13.1	47.6	51.3	39.9	59.0
Vellinge	Skåne	93.1	25,245	14.1	61.5	23.6	28.6	70.6	21.4	77.8
Vetlanda	Jönköping	88.2	17,711	33.8	42.9	22.1	48.3	50.7	44.8	54.1
Vilhelmina	Västerbotten	84.4	4,376	49.2	30.8	16.3	65.2	31.0	63.4	32.8
Vimmerby	Kalmar	88.2	10,358	38.3	40.1	20.3	53.8	44.8	51.8	46.8
Vindeln	Västerbotten	85.0	3,431	42.6	39.4	16.0	59.8	38.2	57.2	40.9
Vingåker	Södermanland	88.5	5,913	43.2	31.5	24.4	52.9	46.2	50.3	48.9
Vårgårda	Västra Götaland	89.4	7,598	34.0	44.1	20.6	50.8	47.9	46.4	52.3
Vänersborg	Västra Götaland	87.8	25,261	42.1	34.5	22.1	53.9	44.8	49.4	49.3
Vännäs	Västerbotten	86.6	5,615	50.8	34.6	13.2	66.7	31.9	63.9	34.7
Värmdö	Stockholm	90.3	28,115	31.9	49.5	17.2	48.1	50.6	41.7	57.0
Värnamo	Jönköping	87.7	22,268	34.7	45.8	18.4	50.9	48.0	47.3	51.6
Västervik	Kalmar	86.3	24,571	43.8	35.9	19.2	56.5	42.4	52.6	46.3
Västerås	Västmanland	86.9	96,032	39.7	41.5	17.5	52.8	45.9	46.0	52.7
Växjö	Kronoberg	89.3	59,550	41.4	42.1	15.4	54.9	43.9	50.5	48.4
Ydre	Östergötland	91.3	2,616	31.3	46.8	20.5	49.8	48.7	46.2	52.3
Ystad	Skåne	88.0	20,786	32.9	41.7	24.2	45.4	53.4	40.6	58.1
Åmål	Västra Götaland	84.8	7,909	44.7	30.6	23.2	55.7	42.9	52.3	46.3
Ånge	Västernorrland	85.6	6,280	49.8	26.3	22.1	59.9	38.3	58.3	39.9
Åre	Jämtland	88.6	7,297	40.6	44.5	13.2	64.9	33.4	62.2	36.1
Årjäng	Värmland	84.2	5,626	30.7	43.3	25.1	44.1	54.9	40.6	58.4
Åsele	Västerbotten	85.4	1,805	50.0	32.8	15.5	69.4	29.0	66.7	31.6
Åstorp	Skåne	82.4	8,719	34.8	29.6	34.5	42.4	56.4	39.5	59.3
Åtvidaberg	Östergötland	89.3	8,013	41.3	36.2	21.3	55.0	43.8	51.0	47.8
Älmhult	Kronoberg	87.7	10,067	37.4	40.2	21.3	51.9	47.1	48.5	50.4
Älvdalen	Dalarna	86.7	4,696	39.1	30.6	28.5	53.4	44.8	50.9	47.3
Älvkarleby	Uppsala	87.5	6,009	48.3	23.8	26.7	56.1	42.7	52.7	46.1
Älvsbyn	Norrbotten	85.4	5,306	56.8	25.2	16.6	68.8	29.8	65.8	32.8
Ängelholm	Skåne	87.4	28,134	29.2	45.4	24.2	42.0	56.9	37.3	61.5
Öckerö	Västra Götaland	91.8	9,170	28.2	53.4	17.5	40.2	58.9	33.6	65.5
Ödeshög	Östergötland	88.9	3,556	32.8	44.3	20.9	45.4	52.6	43.1	54.9
Örebro	Örebro	87.8	98,428	44.7	39.3	14.4	58.4	40.0	52.8	45.7
Örkelljunga	Skåne	85.3	6,192	26.0	36.9	35.5	35.4	63.1	32.8	65.7
Örnsköldsvik	Västernorrland	88.6	37,786	52.7	34.7	11.5	67.5	31.4	64.8	34.1
Östersund	Jämtland	87.9	42,176	46.8	38.6	13.3	64.7	34.0	61.0	37.7
Österåker	Stockholm	89.3	27,711	29.1	53.6	16.1	46.0	52.9	38.5	60.4
Östhammar	Uppsala	86.7	14,814	38.5	38.7	21.1	51.4	47.0	47.3	51.0
Östra Göinge	Skåne	86.6	8,747	33.5	32.3	33.3	41.8	57.3	39.4	59.7
Överkalix	Norrbotten	85.1	2,241	58.2	22.1	18.3	69.1	29.6	67.0	31.7
Övertorneå	Norrbotten	81.0	2,633	50.2	33.0	16.2	68.2	31.2	66.5	32.9
		87.2	6,476,725	40.7	40.3	17.5	54.8	43.7	49.3	49.2
Source: val.se

== Results by municipality ==
Social Democratic

Moderate Party

Sweden Democrats

Centre Party

Left Party

Christian Democrats

Liberals

Green

Shaded, red (S+V+MP) to blue (M+C+KD+L)

Counties not in accordance with provinces include the three Småland counties of Jönköping, Kalmar (including Öland) and Kronoberg. From an enlarged perspective, the three provinces of Västergötland, Bohuslän and Dalsland form Västra Götaland, Örebro County is divided between three separate provinces centered around Närke. As a result, Västmanland County is smaller than the province. Stockholm County is also consisting part of the provinces of Södermanland and Uppland, the latter of which forms Uppsala County in its north. Farther north, Gävleborg is a merger between Gästrikland and Hälsingland, Västernorrland consists of Medelpad and Ångermanland, whereas Lapland is divided between Västerbotten and Norrbotten counties. Härjedalen is a single municipality roughly corresponding with the provincial borders, merged into Jämtland County.

=== Blekinge ===
Location	Turnout	Share	Votes	S	M	SD	C	V	KD	L	MP	Other
Karlshamn	87.8	20.5	21,439	33.0	16.9	24.3	6.5	6.1	5.1	3.4	3.3	1.3
Karlskrona	89.9	42.4	44,317	31.2	18.4	21.6	7.2	5.6	6.2	5.2	3.4	1.0
Olofström	85.0	7.9	8,337	36.6	12.0	28.9	6.5	5.7	4.9	2.3	1.9	1.2
Ronneby	87.7	17.8	18,634	29.9	16.2	29.4	7.1	5.5	5.2	3.2	2.1	1.3
Sölvesborg	88.3	11.4	11,930	27.8	19.1	31.2	5.7	3.7	6.1	3.2	2.1	1.2
Total	88.5	1.6	104,514	31.4	17.3	25.2	6.8	5.5	5.7	4.0	2.9	1.3
Source: val.se

=== Dalarna ===
Location	Turnout	Share	Votes	S	M	SD	C	V	KD	L	MP	Other
Avesta	86.7	7.8	14,573	34.8	15.8	24.7	6.8	6.5	5.0	2.9	2.2	1.3
Borlänge	87.2	17.3	32,460	32.7	17.1	20.3	7.4	7.6	5.1	4.4	3.9	1.5
Falun	88.8	21.0	39,461	28.0	19.7	15.3	11.8	8.2	6.0	4.6	4.9	1.5
Gagnef	89.3	3.6	6,901	27.4	14.4	21.8	13.7	6.1	8.5	3.8	2.8	1.6
Hedemora	85.8	5.2	9,824	30.6	15.3	22.5	10.0	7.5	6.9	2.7	2.9	1.7
Leksand	89.5	5.8	10,944	26.1	19.6	16.2	12.9	7.0	9.5	3.6	3.7	1.4
Ludvika	87.1	9.0	16,868	35.4	14.1	23.2	6.6	8.3	4.5	3.5	2.9	1.6
Malung-Sälen	87.0	3.6	6,756	29.0	19.0	24.6	9.3	6.1	5.9	3.2	1.7	1.3
Mora	86.6	7.3	13,748	29.2	15.7	22.5	11.8	6.1	6.8	3.4	2.9	1.6
Orsa	86.7	2.4	4,601	27.9	11.5	26.6	11.0	8.1	7.2	2.6	3.0	2.2
Rättvik	87.2	4.1	7,644	26.7	16.8	23.4	12.2	6.1	7.1	3.1	3.0	1.6
Smedjebacken	88.1	4.0	7,440	39.0	13.9	22.9	6.3	7.6	4.5	2.5	2.1	1.3
Säter	88.9	4.0	7,610	29.8	17.0	21.7	12.4	6.3	6.2	3.1	2.5	1.1
Vansbro	86.2	2.4	4,501	29.4	13.3	20.8	14.6	7.2	9.7	2.1	1.2	1.6
Älvdalen	86.7	2.5	4,696	32.1	10.9	28.5	11.8	5.3	5.4	2.6	1.6	1.8
Total	87.6	2.9	188,027	30.7	16.7	20.8	10.0	7.3	6.1	3.6	3.3	1.5
Source:val.se

=== Gotland ===
Location	Turnout	Share	Votes	S	M	SD	C	V	KD	L	MP	Other
Gotland	88.8	100.0	41,129	29.8	16.6	12.7	17.2	9.0	4.1	3.7	5.0	1.9
Total	88.8	0.6	41,129	29.8	16.6	12.7	17.2	9.0	4.1	3.7	5.0	1.9
Source: val.se

=== Gävleborg ===
Location	Turnout	Share	Votes	S	M	SD	C	V	KD	L	MP	Other
Bollnäs	85.5	9.3	17,173	34.6	14.0	19.6	11.3	7.7	5.9	3.4	2.5	1.0
Gävle	87.5	35.7	66,241	32.1	18.2	19.5	6.3	8.5	4.9	5.4	3.9	1.3
Hofors	84.6	3.3	6,118	39.4	11.3	21.8	5.2	11.8	4.0	3.5	1.9	1.1
Hudiksvall	85.6	13.3	24,699	34.7	13.8	16.3	12.6	9.3	5.3	2.8	3.6	1.6
Ljusdal	83.7	6.5	12,065	34.0	14.4	20.0	12.3	6.9	5.1	3.4	2.8	1.3
Nordanstig	83.6	3.3	6,084	32.5	11.7	21.5	11.8	9.6	6.9	2.5	1.9	1.6
Ockelbo	86.2	2.1	3,818	31.7	11.3	27.3	11.4	7.5	5.0	2.0	2.8	1.1
Ovanåker	86.2	4.1	7,645	32.3	12.5	17.8	17.0	4.8	10.1	2.7	1.8	1.1
Sandviken	87.0	13.4	24,794	37.0	14.4	21.4	6.7	8.4	4.5	4.3	2.3	1.1
Söderhamn	86.1	9.0	16,776	36.5	14.4	19.6	9.9	8.3	5.0	2.9	2.4	1.0
Total	86.3	2.9	185,413	34.1	15.3	19.6	9.1	8.4	5.3	4.0	3.1	1.3
Source: val.se

=== Halland ===
Location	Turnout	Share	Votes	S	M	SD	C	V	KD	L	MP	Other
Falkenberg	87.7	13.6	29,472	30.2	18.8	17.6	12.3	5.1	7.0	4.3	3.4	1.3
Halmstad	87.4	30.2	65,498	30.4	21.3	17.7	8.2	5.5	6.2	5.3	3.7	1.6
Hylte	85.0	2.8	6,056	31.2	14.4	25.8	11.7	4.0	6.6	3.3	1.9	1.2
Kungsbacka	91.8	25.8	56,049	16.3	30.6	19.3	9.8	3.7	7.8	7.6	3.7	1.2
Laholm	88.0	7.6	16,438	23.3	18.9	25.7	11.7	3.9	7.6	4.5	3.0	1.4
Varberg	90.0	20.0	43,469	28.3	20.7	16.1	11.1	5.6	7.5	5.8	3.7	1.2
Total	89.0	3.4	216,982	25.8	22.9	18.6	10.1	4.8	7.1	5.7	3.5	1.4
Source: val.se

=== Jämtland ===
Location	Turnout	Share	Votes	S	M	SD	C	V	KD	L	MP	Other
Berg	85.6	5.4	4,610	32.0	15.3	19.7	16.9	6.3	4.6	1.7	2.2	1.4
Bräcke	85.0	4.8	4,131	38.2	12.4	19.2	14.2	7.4	3.9	1.5	1.4	1.8
Härjedalen	84.5	7.9	6,697	34.9	14.0	18.8	13.9	7.1	4.3	2.8	1.8	2.3
Krokom	88.5	11.0	9,391	31.1	14.1	15.6	18.7	8.3	5.6	2.3	3.1	1.1
Ragunda	85.4	4.0	3,446	37.5	7.9	20.9	14.8	9.2	4.0	1.7	1.5	2.5
Strömsund	84.4	8.8	7,475	41.1	10.2	20.8	12.7	7.7	4.1	1.1	1.4	1.0
Åre	88.6	8.6	7,297	26.2	15.4	13.2	21.6	8.3	4.8	2.7	6.2	1.7
Östersund	87.9	49.5	42,176	33.3	15.6	13.3	14.2	9.1	5.1	3.7	4.4	1.3
Total	87.1	1.3	85,223	33.6	14.3	15.6	15.4	8.4	4.8	2.9	3.6	1.5
Source: val.se

=== Jönköping ===
Location	Turnout	Share	Votes	S	M	SD	C	V	KD	L	MP	Other
Aneby	89.9	2.0	4,485	23.9	16.2	21.1	12.8	4.0	14.5	3.4	2.3	1.7
Eksjö	88.4	4.9	11,294	26.7	17.0	19.6	12.4	4.7	10.5	4.4	3.2	1.5
Gislaved	85.2	7.7	17,752	29.4	18.4	22.3	11.9	3.9	7.9	3.2	2.3	0.8
Gnosjö	86.0	2.6	5,855	26.3	18.5	21.8	9.8	2.8	15.0	3.2	1.8	0.8
Habo	93.4	3.4	7,746	23.7	19.7	20.0	8.8	3.9	15.1	4.2	3.4	1.1
Jönköping	88.3	39.3	90,129	27.6	18.6	16.4	9.2	5.9	12.3	4.6	4.2	1.2
Mullsjö	89.6	2.1	4,823	25.3	14.1	22.1	7.0	5.4	17.9	2.6	4.0	1.6
Nässjö	88.0	8.4	19,397	29.4	15.4	22.9	8.4	5.4	10.8	3.5	2.9	1.4
Sävsjö	87.5	3.1	7,028	22.1	16.4	25.6	9.9	3.2	17.9	2.4	1.7	0.9
Tranås	88.5	5.3	12,279	31.7	16.7	19.5	9.2	5.4	9.2	4.0	3.1	1.4
Vaggeryd	88.0	3.8	8,813	29.3	15.3	20.4	10.4	4.2	13.1	3.6	2.6	1.2
Vetlanda	88.2	7.7	17,711	27.8	16.9	22.1	10.9	3.9	11.6	3.5	2.1	1.1
Värnamo	87.7	9.7	22,268	28.5	18.1	18.4	12.6	3.8	11.6	3.6	2.5	1.0
Total	88.1	3.5	229,580	27.8	17.7	19.3	10.1	4.9	12.0	4.0	3.2	1.2
Source: val.se

=== Kalmar ===
Location	Turnout	Share	Votes	S	M	SD	C	V	KD	L	MP	Other
Borgholm	88.6	4.8	7,682	23.7	18.9	21.4	14.2	5.7	8.3	3.4	3.1	1.2
Emmaboda	87.0	3.7	5,919	33.5	14.4	22.3	11.4	5.8	6.1	2.5	2.4	1.6
Hultsfred	85.8	5.4	8,661	33.6	13.9	21.8	10.6	5.9	9.4	1.8	1.6	1.4
Högsby	85.9	2.2	3,466	31.8	15.0	26.7	9.8	5.3	7.6	1.5	1.5	0.8
Kalmar	89.2	28.4	45,641	30.4	19.7	17.1	9.2	6.7	6.6	4.9	4.2	1.3
Mönsterås	89.3	5.5	8,911	31.9	13.8	26.3	10.0	5.3	6.5	3.1	2.1	1.1
Mörbylånga	91.7	6.4	10,367	27.1	18.5	20.6	11.2	5.9	7.3	3.9	4.0	1.4
Nybro	86.6	7.9	12,697	32.8	14.8	22.7	10.2	5.9	7.5	2.9	1.8	1.4
Oskarshamn	88.1	11.1	17,870	32.3	18.2	22.2	6.0	5.9	8.2	4.7	1.7	0.9
Torsås	88.0	2.9	4,721	28.7	12.7	28.8	12.0	4.4	7.4	2.9	2.1	1.1
Vimmerby	88.2	6.4	10,358	30.4	16.3	20.3	13.5	5.6	8.3	2.0	2.3	1.4
Västervik	86.3	15.3	24,571	34.3	16.9	19.2	8.8	6.7	6.3	3.9	2.8	1.2
Total	88.1	2.5	160,864	31.2	17.2	20.6	9.8	6.1	7.2	3.8	2.9	1.2
Source: val.se

=== Kronoberg ===
Location	Turnout	Share	Votes	S	M	SD	C	V	KD	L	MP	Other
Alvesta	88.3	9.9	12,331	28.6	17.8	25.1	9.1	5.0	7.4	2.9	2.6	1.4
Lessebo	87.8	4.0	4,962	38.4	13.6	22.1	7.3	7.2	5.4	2.5	2.5	1.0
Ljungby	86.9	14.5	18,071	28.3	18.6	23.4	9.3	4.9	8.5	3.1	2.5	1.4
Markaryd	85.7	4.8	5,973	27.0	16.5	31.5	6.2	3.1	10.6	1.8	1.6	1.6
Tingsryd	86.7	6.3	7,881	27.3	15.7	27.1	11.7	4.8	8.4	1.8	2.0	1.3
Uppvidinge	86.8	4.6	5,735	28.8	14.6	26.2	11.9	5.9	7.3	2.2	1.7	1.3
Växjö	89.3	47.8	59,550	30.0	21.4	15.4	9.2	7.2	7.2	4.4	4.2	1.1
Älmhult	87.7	8.1	10,067	29.6	18.7	21.3	11.1	4.8	7.1	3.4	3.0	1.1
Total	88.2	1.9	124,570	29.6	19.2	20.3	9.4	6.1	7.6	3.5	3.2	1.2
Source: val.se

=== Norrbotten ===
Location	Turnout	Share	Votes	S	M	SD	C	V	KD	L	MP	Other
Arjeplog	84.1	1.1	1,839	35.2	8.9	20.3	7.7	14.3	7.2	2.9	2.1	1.5
Arvidsjaur	85.4	2.5	4,175	44.7	9.3	16.4	9.3	10.6	3.9	3.6	0.9	1.3
Boden	88.0	11.5	19,110	41.8	14.3	17.8	6.2	8.1	4.6	3.6	2.2	1.4
Gällivare	82.3	6.9	11,464	42.0	12.2	20.4	3.7	12.9	3.3	2.0	2.5	1.1
Haparanda	72.8	2.6	4,454	36.7	12.8	24.5	9.6	5.9	5.3	1.9	1.8	1.6
Jokkmokk	83.4	1.9	3,228	40.3	8.3	16.8	5.2	14.6	3.9	2.7	7.1	1.1
Kalix	87.0	6.6	10,971	45.4	11.7	18.4	6.4	7.9	3.6	2.9	2.8	1.0
Kiruna	85.8	8.9	14,796	38.2	10.7	19.7	5.4	13.5	4.9	2.5	2.8	2.3
Luleå	89.0	31.9	53,182	39.0	15.4	13.4	7.5	10.5	4.8	4.4	3.6	1.6
Pajala	81.4	2.3	3,808	37.7	9.4	16.5	5.1	20.0	7.4	1.5	1.4	1.1
Piteå	89.8	17.7	29,523	47.5	11.8	11.8	7.5	10.6	4.8	2.5	2.4	1.1
Älvsbyn	85.4	3.2	5,306	44.8	8.6	16.6	9.0	10.7	4.6	3.0	1.2	1.4
Överkalix	85.1	1.3	2,241	46.7	7.8	18.3	8.8	10.5	3.4	2.1	1.1	1.3
Övertorneå	81.0	1.6	2,633	39.5	9.6	16.2	16.3	9.4	5.4	1.7	1.3	0.6
Total	86.7	2.6	166,678	41.7	12.8	15.8	7.1	10.7	4.6	3.2	2.8	1.4
Source: val.se

=== Skåne ===
Skåne County was divided into four separate constituencies, a legacy of the previous divide between Malmöhus and Kristianstad counties before the 1997 merger as well as the large population.

==== Malmö ====
Location	Turnout	Share	Votes	S	M	SD	C	V	KD	L	MP	Other
Malmö	82.0	100.0	193,298	29.1	19.5	16.8	5.7	11.9	3.8	5.6	5.6	2.0
Total	82.0	3.0	193,298	29.1	19.5	16.8	5.7	11.9	3.8	5.6	5.6	2.0
Source: val.se

==== Skåne NE ====
Location	Turnout	Share	Votes	S	M	SD	C	V	KD	L	MP	Other
Bromölla	88.0	4.0	8,151	31.0	13.4	38.2	3.3	3.4	4.6	3.5	1.6	1.0
Båstad	88.9	5.1	10,362	16.4	28.5	21.5	11.4	3.3	8.5	5.4	4.0	1.1
Hässleholm	86.5	16.5	33,334	25.5	18.0	29.1	6.9	4.6	7.3	4.1	3.1	1.4
Klippan	84.2	5.2	10,535	24.2	15.7	36.6	5.8	4.0	6.8	3.1	2.3	1.5
Kristianstad	86.3	26.6	53,957	26.2	21.8	26.5	5.9	4.1	5.6	6.2	2.8	1.1
Osby	87.0	4.1	8,385	28.2	16.1	31.2	7.3	3.9	7.3	2.4	2.3	1.3
Perstorp	82.0	2.0	4,126	29.3	16.0	35.3	5.0	3.3	5.3	2.4	2.0	1.3
Simrishamn	86.7	6.5	13,243	23.4	20.5	25.0	8.2	5.8	6.0	4.6	4.6	2.0
Tomelilla	86.2	4.3	8,617	23.2	17.7	33.2	9.5	4.3	4.7	3.0	2.9	1.6
Åstorp	82.4	4.3	8,719	29.2	17.3	34.5	4.7	3.9	4.7	3.0	1.7	1.2
Ängelholm	87.4	13.9	28,134	22.3	25.3	24.2	8.1	3.7	7.4	4.7	3.2	1.2
Örkelljunga	85.3	3.1	6,192	20.8	15.4	35.5	6.7	2.9	12.1	2.7	2.3	1.5
Östra Göinge	86.6	4.3	8,747	27.6	18.1	33.3	5.9	3.8	5.8	2.4	2.1	0.9
Total	86.4	3.1	202,502	25.0	20.2	28.8	6.8	4.1	6.5	4.4	2.9	1.3
Source: val.se

==== Skåne S ====
Location	Turnout	Share	Votes	S	M	SD	C	V	KD	L	MP	Other
Burlöv	80.8	4.0	10,010	32.4	19.4	23.9	5.0	6.2	3.6	4.7	3.4	1.4
Kävlinge	91.1	8.1	20,396	22.6	25.7	25.0	7.7	2.8	5.2	6.4	3.3	1.3
Lomma	93.9	6.5	16,401	16.7	33.2	17.1	9.3	2.5	6.4	10.0	3.8	1.0
Lund	89.7	31.5	79,575	23.2	19.1	12.2	9.7	9.7	4.8	9.8	9.1	2.4
Sjöbo	86.6	4.9	12,418	19.1	18.2	39.2	7.1	3.3	6.2	2.9	2.4	1.6
Skurup	88.2	4.0	10,054	22.6	20.6	33.3	7.2	4.3	4.4	3.8	2.6	1.2
Staffanstorp	90.7	6.2	15,733	22.1	27.8	22.9	7.6	3.1	5.1	6.4	3.8	1.2
Svedala	90.9	5.4	13,735	21.9	22.6	31.5	6.0	3.2	5.3	5.4	3.0	1.3
Trelleborg	86.4	11.3	28,451	24.9	21.5	30.7	5.7	3.9	5.2	4.5	2.5	1.1
Vellinge	93.1	10.0	25,245	10.6	39.6	23.6	7.2	1.3	7.5	7.3	2.2	0.8
Ystad	88.0	8.2	20,786	25.4	23.4	24.2	7.7	4.1	5.8	4.8	3.3	1.3
Total	89.4	3.9	252,804	21.8	24.0	22.1	7.9	5.3	5.4	7.0	4.9	1.6
Source: val.se

==== Skåne W ====
Although the divide is not clear by using one decimal, the Sweden Democrats had 26.14% as the largest party compared to 26.13% for the Social Democrats, 50,059 votes to 50,041.

Location	Turnout	Share	Votes	S	M	SD	C	V	KD	L	MP	Other
Bjuv	82.7	4.5	8,649	30.4	14.4	38.4	3.6	3.6	4.2	2.6	1.8	1.0
Eslöv	86.3	10.8	20,665	27.5	17.6	28.0	7.3	5.2	4.8	4.4	3.3	2.0
Helsingborg	84.3	46.2	88,462	26.6	23.5	23.8	6.0	4.8	5.3	5.1	3.7	1.3
Höganäs	88.9	9.2	17,613	20.4	27.3	20.5	8.6	3.4	7.5	6.7	4.5	1.2
Hörby	86.7	5.3	10,064	19.5	17.3	35.4	8.3	4.5	6.6	4.3	2.5	1.6
Höör	88.1	5.6	10,737	19.3	18.9	28.2	7.8	6.2	6.4	5.5	5.6	2.1
Landskrona	83.5	14.0	26,783	32.1	17.6	25.4	4.5	5.1	6.7	4.1	3.2	1.3
Svalöv	87.7	4.5	8,533	23.0	15.1	34.3	9.3	4.6	5.1	3.7	2.6	2.2
Total	85.2	3.0	191,506	26.1	21.0	26.1	6.4	4.7	5.4	5.2	3.5	1.4
Source: val.se

=== Stockholm ===
Stockholm was divided into two separate constituencies, Stockholm as a municipality and the rest of the county as "Stockholm County".

==== Stockholm (city) ====
Location	Turnout	Share	Votes	S	M	SD	C	V	KD	L	MP	Other
Stockholm	87.3	100.0	611,206	23.8	21.9	9.8	9.1	13.1	4.9	7.9	7.7	1.9
Total	87.3	9.4	611,206	23.8	21.9	9.8	9.1	13.1	4.9	7.9	7.7	1.9
Source: val.se

==== Stockholm County ====
Location	Turnout	Share	Votes	S	M	SD	C	V	KD	L	MP	Other
Botkyrka	78.2	5.6	45,393	32.3	18.5	16.1	5.2	9.9	8.1	4.4	3.9	1.7
Danderyd	91.9	2.7	21,897	8.0	41.6	10.3	11.3	2.4	10.1	11.2	3.8	1.3
Ekerö	92.2	2.2	17,814	17.2	28.1	16.2	11.2	4.8	7.9	7.6	5.7	1.3
Haninge	85.1	6.2	50,484	27.2	22.9	19.9	6.1	8.0	5.4	5.1	3.7	1.6
Huddinge	84.9	7.5	61,440	26.1	24.1	15.2	7.5	8.6	5.4	6.1	5.3	1.7
Järfälla	86.3	5.6	45,654	27.7	24.0	15.0	6.3	8.8	6.3	6.0	4.5	1.4
Lidingö	90.2	3.8	31,032	12.4	36.0	11.0	11.8	3.5	8.6	10.8	4.9	1.1
Nacka	90.0	7.9	64,101	19.4	28.7	10.8	12.2	6.5	6.1	8.4	6.5	1.4
Norrtälje	87.1	5.1	41,174	26.2	22.2	19.9	9.6	6.2	5.9	4.7	3.8	1.4
Nykvarn	90.7	0.8	6,847	22.4	27.2	24.6	7.7	3.5	6.1	4.6	3.0	1.0
Nynäshamn	86.5	2.2	17,642	27.3	21.1	23.1	6.4	6.8	5.8	4.5	3.8	1.3
Salem	87.8	1.2	9,985	23.1	24.8	16.9	7.6	6.0	8.0	7.6	4.5	1.6
Sigtuna	83.0	3.1	25,576	25.5	24.7	19.3	6.7	6.4	7.6	4.9	3.5	1.6
Sollentuna	88.6	5.4	43,676	20.9	28.1	11.2	10.2	6.5	7.5	9.0	5.3	1.4
Solna	87.4	6.2	50,510	24.0	23.7	11.3	9.0	9.9	5.8	8.1	6.4	1.8
Sundbyberg	85.6	3.7	29,807	26.6	22.4	12.2	8.1	11.0	5.0	7.1	6.0	1.6
Södertälje	77.5	5.9	48,273	27.2	19.8	17.5	5.9	7.7	11.2	4.5	4.5	1.8
Tyresö	90.3	3.7	30,260	23.9	25.8	16.3	7.9	6.4	5.8	6.9	5.4	1.6
Täby	91.1	5.7	46,386	14.0	36.0	11.4	11.0	3.2	8.3	10.7	4.1	1.3
Upplands-Bro	86.8	2.0	16,366	26.2	23.2	20.1	6.0	6.6	7.5	5.4	3.3	1.7
Upplands-Väsby	84.7	3.2	25,830	27.0	23.1	18.0	6.3	8.0	6.7	5.7	3.9	1.3
Vallentuna	90.0	2.6	20,952	18.9	28.3	16.6	10.1	4.5	7.6	7.7	4.9	1.4
Vaxholm	92.7	1.0	8,106	16.4	30.3	13.1	13.3	4.7	7.9	7.8	5.5	1.1
Värmdö	90.3	3.4	28,115	20.5	27.5	17.2	9.8	6.0	5.9	6.4	5.4	1.4
Österåker	89.3	3.4	27,711	19.7	29.7	16.1	9.4	5.0	7.1	7.5	4.4	1.1
Total	86.6	12.6	815,031	23.1	26.0	15.2	8.6	6.9	7.0	6.9	4.8	1.5
Source: val.se

=== Södermanland ===
Location	Turnout	Share	Votes	S	M	SD	C	V	KD	L	MP	Other
Eskilstuna	84.7	34.2	62,678	32.2	19.9	21.0	5.9	6.8	4.8	4.7	3.3	1.3
Flen	86.0	5.5	10,118	33.0	16.9	21.3	8.3	6.9	5.6	3.2	3.5	1.4
Gnesta	88.4	3.9	7,217	25.8	20.2	18.8	10.7	8.3	5.1	3.5	5.4	2.3
Katrineholm	86.7	11.8	21,583	37.3	17.4	17.8	8.0	6.0	5.3	3.8	3.3	1.2
Nyköping	88.7	20.0	36,687	32.0	20.1	16.1	8.5	6.4	6.4	4.5	4.5	1.4
Oxelösund	86.7	4.1	7,545	39.7	15.9	18.8	4.2	8.8	4.7	3.3	3.1	1.4
Strängnäs	88.4	12.5	22,844	23.6	26.7	19.8	8.0	6.0	5.9	4.9	3.9	1.2
Trosa	90.5	4.8	8,864	23.4	27.2	18.8	9.2	5.3	6.3	4.7	4.1	1.1
Vingåker	88.5	3.2	5,913	33.4	15.7	24.4	7.0	7.1	6.1	2.6	2.8	0.9
Total	86.7	2.8	183,449	31.4	20.4	19.3	7.4	6.6	5.5	4.3	3.7	1.3
Source: val.se

=== Uppsala ===
Location	Turnout	Share	Votes	S	M	SD	C	V	KD	L	MP	Other
Enköping	87.7	11.8	28,462	26.1	22.9	20.4	10.0	4.7	6.6	4.6	3.1	1.7
Heby	86.7	3.8	9,064	29.1	13.8	22.9	13.2	5.5	8.0	3.0	2.4	2.1
Håbo	89.1	5.5	13,395	21.1	26.6	24.2	7.1	5.2	6.5	5.4	2.8	1.2
Knivsta	91.3	4.7	11,276	20.8	23.3	16.9	10.7	5.4	8.6	7.2	5.4	1.6
Tierp	87.5	5.7	13,802	33.9	13.8	20.9	11.3	6.6	5.4	3.1	2.7	2.2
Uppsala	89.5	59.9	144,667	26.5	18.4	11.5	8.9	11.0	6.9	7.4	7.2	2.2
Älvkarleby	87.5	2.5	6,009	39.3	11.7	26.7	4.4	6.8	4.3	3.4	2.2	1.2
Östhammar	86.7	6.1	14,814	30.9	17.4	21.1	8.8	5.1	8.4	4.1	2.6	1.6
Total	88.9	3.7	241,489	27.0	19.0	15.4	9.2	8.7	6.9	6.2	5.6	2.0
Source: val.se

=== Värmland ===
Location	Turnout	Share	Votes	S	M	SD	C	V	KD	L	MP	Other
Arvika	85.9	9.2	16,961	34.0	15.1	18.5	9.4	8.4	5.7	3.6	3.6	1.7
Eda	82.4	2.4	4,329	33.7	14.4	23.0	10.4	5.8	7.4	2.8	1.3	1.4
Filipstad	83.6	3.5	6,392	41.2	12.0	25.6	4.9	7.2	4.2	2.4	1.4	1.2
Forshaga	88.8	4.1	7,600	39.0	13.3	20.5	7.9	6.5	6.2	2.8	2.5	1.4
Grums	86.0	3.2	5,876	41.2	12.8	23.2	7.0	5.5	4.7	2.2	1.7	1.8
Hagfors	84.1	4.1	7,607	47.5	9.3	18.0	7.9	8.3	4.5	2.3	1.3	1.0
Hammarö	91.0	5.9	10,916	34.2	20.0	13.2	8.8	5.7	6.6	6.6	4.1	0.9
Karlstad	89.0	34.4	63,334	31.7	19.5	14.1	8.5	7.9	6.4	5.7	4.8	1.4
Kil	89.0	4.4	8,060	32.0	16.1	21.3	10.2	6.0	5.8	4.6	3.1	1.0
Kristinehamn	86.8	8.7	16,088	34.1	16.0	18.0	8.8	7.6	5.9	5.5	3.0	1.3
Munkfors	85.1	1.3	2,340	52.2	8.3	15.4	8.1	6.1	3.9	2.9	1.4	1.6
Storfors	87.1	1.4	2,622	40.7	10.7	22.5	8.4	6.9	5.3	2.9	1.2	1.4
Sunne	87.4	4.8	8,810	28.7	17.6	18.8	15.1	4.8	7.2	3.9	2.6	1.4
Säffle	86.2	5.4	9,896	27.7	15.6	25.1	14.2	4.6	6.8	3.1	2.0	1.0
Torsby	83.7	4.1	7,509	35.5	13.9	21.4	11.2	6.5	5.2	3.1	1.9	1.3
Årjäng	84.2	3.1	5,626	25.2	13.8	25.1	10.0	3.7	16.0	3.5	1.8	1.0
Total	87.3	2.8	183,966	33.9	16.4	18.0	9.3	7.0	6.3	4.4	3.3	1.3
Source: val.se

=== Västerbotten ===
Location	Turnout	Share	Votes	S	M	SD	C	V	KD	L	MP	Other
Bjurholm	84.9	0.9	1,587	29.2	17.9	18.7	14.7	5.0	7.6	5.0	1.5	0.4
Dorotea	84.6	1.0	1,720	43.8	6.2	12.3	14.9	10.6	4.9	3.6	1.2	2.5
Lycksele	84.5	4.4	7,787	38.9	14.4	13.8	7.3	9.5	9.7	3.8	1.4	1.2
Malå	85.0	1.1	1,961	43.0	9.0	14.4	8.0	14.2	5.6	3.9	1.0	0.9
Nordmaling	85.8	2.6	4,656	35.9	13.0	16.3	13.6	9.2	5.9	3.3	1.7	1.3
Norsjö	83.8	1.4	2,558	42.2	7.9	13.0	10.8	10.1	9.2	4.0	1.1	1.8
Robertsfors	87.1	2.5	4,489	37.9	10.5	10.9	18.5	10.3	5.0	2.4	2.7	1.6
Skellefteå	87.9	27.4	48,964	45.3	12.0	11.7	8.8	9.8	4.9	3.4	3.0	1.2
Sorsele	80.8	0.8	1,514	35.7	11.0	15.5	12.2	12.8	6.9	1.9	2.0	2.1
Storuman	83.2	2.1	3,800	34.4	12.1	17.0	11.0	10.9	7.9	3.5	2.1	1.3
Umeå	89.6	47.3	84,574	34.5	15.4	8.6	9.5	15.7	4.5	4.7	5.5	1.7
Vilhelmina	84.4	2.4	4,376	37.3	7.5	16.3	14.2	10.8	7.3	1.8	1.1	3.7
Vindeln	85.0	1.9	3,431	32.4	14.8	16.0	14.6	8.1	7.3	2.7	2.0	2.0
Vännäs	86.6	3.1	5,615	34.6	12.7	13.2	13.1	13.1	6.0	3.1	2.8	1.4
Åsele	85.4	1.0	1,805	40.3	8.7	15.5	16.7	8.6	4.8	2.7	1.1	1.7
Total	87.9	2.8	178,837	38.1	13.5	10.9	10.1	12.7	5.2	3.9	3.9	1.6
Source: val.se

=== Västernorrland ===
Location	Turnout	Share	Votes	S	M	SD	C	V	KD	L	MP	Other
Härnösand	87.3	10.0	16,284	36.7	13.1	16.8	9.9	8.9	5.3	3.2	4.3	1.8
Kramfors	86.2	7.4	12,066	41.1	9.3	15.8	12.5	11.8	4.0	2.1	1.9	1.7
Sollefteå	86.5	7.7	12,631	35.3	9.0	18.7	12.8	15.3	4.4	1.6	1.5	1.5
Sundsvall	88.2	40.4	65,922	37.7	16.6	15.6	8.3	7.5	5.0	4.8	3.2	1.4
Timrå	87.5	7.4	12,032	43.1	11.9	19.4	6.8	8.0	5.0	3.1	1.9	0.9
Ånge	85.6	3.9	6,280	41.9	11.3	22.1	8.6	6.8	4.9	1.6	1.1	1.8
Örnsköldsvik	88.6	23.2	37,786	44.6	12.7	11.5	12.1	5.9	7.2	2.7	2.2	1.1
Total	87.8	2.5	163,001	39.8	13.7	15.6	9.9	8.2	5.4	3.4	2.7	1.4
Source: val.se

=== Västmanland ===
Location	Turnout	Share	Votes	S	M	SD	C	V	KD	L	MP	Other
Arboga	87.5	5.3	9,233	33.8	18.7	21.7	6.8	5.8	5.1	3.9	3.2	1.1
Fagersta	84.3	4.5	7,825	39.4	14.1	23.0	4.2	8.0	4.7	3.2	2.3	1.2
Hallstahammar	85.8	5.8	10,063	36.2	14.7	23.3	5.3	8.0	5.1	4.0	2.2	1.4
Kungsör	88.3	3.1	5,370	31.4	16.7	23.9	8.6	5.9	5.6	4.4	2.1	1.5
Köping	85.9	9.5	16,390	34.6	15.6	23.9	6.7	6.4	5.9	3.3	2.3	1.2
Norberg	86.7	2.2	3,742	36.5	14.1	21.6	5.7	9.5	4.1	3.8	2.5	2.1
Sala	88.2	8.7	14,958	29.3	16.0	22.2	11.8	6.3	6.0	4.1	2.6	1.6
Skinnskatteberg	85.4	1.7	2,865	38.5	10.7	25.2	6.7	6.6	3.9	4.9	2.0	1.5
Surahammar	85.1	3.6	6,241	36.4	13.0	27.5	4.0	8.2	4.2	3.4	1.9	1.5
Västerås	86.9	55.6	96,032	29.1	22.2	17.5	6.3	7.2	6.2	6.8	3.4	1.3
Total	86.7	2.7	172,719	31.4	19.2	20.1	6.7	7.1	5.8	5.5	3.0	1.3
Source: val.se

=== Västra Götaland ===
Västra Götaland was divided into five separate constituencies, one covering the city of Gothenburg and the other three being geographically distributed between south, north, east and west.

==== Gothenburg ====
Location	Turnout	Share	Votes	S	M	SD	C	V	KD	L	MP	Other
Gothenburg	84.3	100.0	349,645	23.8	19.9	13.5	7.1	14.0	5.5	7.3	7.0	2.1
Total	84.3	5.4	349,645	23.8	19.9	13.5	7.1	14.0	5.5	7.3	7.0	2.1
Source: val.se

==== Västra Götaland E ====
Location	Turnout	Share	Votes	S	M	SD	C	V	KD	L	MP	Other
Essunga	88.0	2.1	3,764	25.8	20.5	22.9	12.0	5.8	6.8	2.7	2.5	1.1
Falköping	87.4	11.9	21,120	29.2	16.8	20.9	9.9	5.9	9.1	3.7	3.1	1.4
Grästorp	88.9	2.2	3,952	25.7	21.1	23.2	12.9	3.2	7.2	3.5	2.1	1.2
Gullspång	86.1	1.9	3,389	35.5	13.9	23.9	8.6	5.9	5.4	2.5	2.2	2.2
Götene	89.2	5.0	8,860	31.1	15.4	18.9	10.1	6.3	9.5	4.0	3.6	1.2
Hjo	88.9	3.5	6,236	27.4	18.6	19.5	9.8	6.2	9.6	4.0	3.6	1.2
Karlsborg	90.6	2.7	4,856	28.4	16.1	22.5	10.7	5.1	8.6	5.3	2.2	1.2
Lidköping	89.5	15.4	27,303	33.2	17.3	17.3	8.9	6.4	7.2	4.9	3.6	1.2
Mariestad	87.5	9.3	16,409	33.0	19.9	17.6	8.3	6.0	7.3	3.7	3.1	1.2
Skara	87.7	6.9	12,250	30.4	19.4	20.2	8.4	6.0	6.9	3.6	3.6	1.5
Skövde	88.0	20.7	36,654	28.8	20.9	16.9	8.8	5.6	8.0	5.6	3.4	1.8
Tibro	88.1	4.1	7,176	31.2	16.3	21.1	8.3	4.6	9.7	5.6	2.3	1.0
Tidaholm	88.6	4.9	8,589	37.8	13.5	21.5	7.4	5.7	7.0	3.4	2.6	1.1
Töreboda	87.0	3.4	5,938	30.5	17.3	23.1	10.9	4.6	6.6	3.1	2.0	1.9
Vara	87.4	5.9	10,505	24.9	21.5	23.7	11.8	4.9	6.6	3.4	1.9	1.3
Total	88.2	2.7	177,001	30.5	18.4	19.5	9.3	5.7	7.8	4.3	3.1	1.4
Source: val.se

==== Västra Götaland N ====
Location	Turnout	Share	Votes	S	M	SD	C	V	KD	L	MP	Other
Bengtsfors	85.4	3.4	6,013	31.8	14.3	25.9	9.3	5.3	7.4	2.6	2.3	1.1
Dals-Ed	85.6	1.7	2,936	24.1	16.3	27.0	12.7	3.0	10.4	2.9	2.2	1.5
Färgelanda	87.3	2.5	4,300	26.6	13.3	32.1	12.2	4.4	5.7	2.9	1.6	1.2
Lysekil	87.5	5.7	9,885	32.4	15.6	21.8	7.1	6.6	5.5	5.4	4.3	1.3
Mellerud	86.1	3.3	5,783	25.3	16.4	28.6	12.0	4.3	7.1	2.8	2.5	1.1
Munkedal	86.2	3.8	6,674	26.2	16.8	27.4	9.2	6.2	7.2	3.1	2.4	1.4
Orust	89.0	6.2	10,740	25.4	19.4	21.3	10.1	6.7	6.7	5.2	3.8	1.5
Sotenäs	88.2	3.8	6,592	24.9	24.7	20.5	7.9	4.8	8.1	5.3	2.7	1.1
Strömstad	84.0	4.2	7,328	26.2	18.9	20.9	8.4	5.6	7.1	6.6	4.4	1.8
Tanum	87.5	4.9	8,574	22.7	22.9	19.5	12.4	5.1	6.7	5.5	3.5	1.8
Trollhättan	86.4	21.0	36,609	36.2	17.7	17.4	6.1	6.9	5.1	5.0	4.4	1.2
Uddevalla	86.7	20.6	35,969	30.3	18.3	20.6	6.6	6.8	7.1	4.9	3.9	1.5
Vänersborg	87.8	14.5	25,261	31.7	16.0	22.1	7.3	6.9	6.7	4.5	3.6	1.3
Åmål	84.8	4.5	7,909	34.9	13.8	23.2	7.5	6.7	5.9	3.4	3.1	1.5
Total	86.8	2.7	174,573	30.6	17.6	21.4	7.9	6.3	6.5	4.7	3.6	1.4
Source: val.se

==== Västra Götaland S ====
Location	Turnout	Share	Votes	S	M	SD	C	V	KD	L	MP	Other
Bollebygd	90.7	4.3	6,209	23.4	20.2	23.9	8.9	5.2	7.7	5.6	4.1	1.0
Borås	86.4	48.7	69,904	29.5	20.5	18.4	7.3	7.0	6.6	5.7	3.7	1.3
Herrljunga	88.9	4.4	6,362	24.8	16.8	21.8	12.4	6.0	8.8	4.9	2.8	1.7
Mark	88.0	15.9	22,770	29.1	16.0	19.8	10.7	7.3	7.1	5.5	3.3	1.3
Svenljunga	87.0	4.8	6,884	25.8	17.4	25.6	11.9	4.1	6.8	4.3	2.2	2.0
Tranemo	88.2	5.4	7,682	29.9	17.9	19.8	14.0	4.5	6.2	3.8	2.7	1.1
Ulricehamn	88.3	11.2	16,096	24.7	19.7	19.6	12.9	5.5	7.9	5.1	3.2	1.3
Vårgårda	89.4	5.3	7,598	24.9	14.0	20.6	12.4	5.6	12.4	4.3	3.6	1.3
Total	87.4	2.2	143,505	28.0	19.0	19.7	9.6	6.4	7.3	5.3	3.4	1.3
Source:val.se

==== Västra Götaland W ====
Location	Turnout	Share	Votes	S	M	SD	C	V	KD	L	MP	Other
Ale	87.9	7.9	19,330	27.9	18.8	22.3	7.0	7.7	6.3	4.7	3.9	1.4
Alingsås	89.8	11.3	27,571	26.4	18.3	15.3	9.8	8.6	7.8	6.7	5.8	1.4
Härryda	90.8	9.9	24,181	21.6	24.0	17.7	9.3	5.8	6.5	8.1	5.6	1.5
Kungälv	90.6	12.4	30,254	25.1	22.2	18.6	8.7	6.2	7.7	6.1	4.3	1.3
Lerum	91.3	11.2	27,360	22.5	23.5	17.0	8.6	6.6	7.4	7.5	5.7	1.3
Lilla Edet	84.8	3.5	8,631	28.7	14.4	29.8	6.7	7.3	5.2	3.8	2.9	1.4
Mölndal	89.3	18.1	43,933	24.0	22.5	15.8	8.1	7.6	6.3	8.2	5.8	1.6
Partille	87.9	9.9	24,080	23.8	23.2	16.3	7.9	8.1	6.9	7.2	5.3	1.3
Stenungsund	89.9	7.2	17,509	26.0	23.8	19.3	7.3	5.4	6.8	6.2	4.1	1.1
Tjörn	90.4	4.6	11,259	20.6	21.6	20.8	7.7	5.1	12.3	6.9	3.8	1.3
Öckerö	91.8	3.8	9,170	18.7	21.9	17.5	5.4	4.9	19.4	6.6	4.6	0.9
Total	89.6	3.8	243,278	24.2	21.8	18.0	8.2	6.8	7.7	6.9	5.0	1.4
Source:val.se

=== Örebro ===
Location	Turnout	Share	Votes	S	M	SD	C	V	KD	L	MP	Other
Askersund	88.6	4.0	7,818	32.2	16.5	23.3	9.2	5.5	6.8	3.0	2.3	1.4
Degerfors	87.1	3.3	6,415	44.1	10.7	19.9	5.4	10.2	4.0	2.4	2.4	1.1
Hallsberg	88.6	5.2	10,200	36.9	13.8	21.7	7.9	6.6	5.9	3.2	2.6	1.4
Hällefors	84.1	2.2	4,289	39.7	11.9	24.7	6.0	9.0	3.4	2.1	1.8	1.4
Karlskoga	87.1	10.2	19,899	37.5	18.0	18.3	6.0	7.2	4.8	4.0	2.8	1.3
Kumla	88.6	7.1	13,948	32.6	16.9	21.1	7.1	5.6	8.0	5.0	2.7	1.2
Laxå	86.8	1.9	3,665	35.5	12.0	24.2	6.4	6.9	9.4	2.8	1.6	1.2
Lekeberg	90.8	2.7	5,293	25.9	15.7	23.9	13.2	5.3	8.7	3.0	2.7	1.7
Lindesberg	87.6	7.8	15,280	31.6	15.8	25.0	8.5	6.1	6.1	2.8	2.6	1.6
Ljusnarsberg	83.7	1.5	3,000	33.8	11.3	31.2	6.0	7.0	4.2	2.7	1.9	1.9
Nora	86.9	3.5	6,922	33.7	14.7	21.4	8.9	6.3	6.3	3.6	3.4	1.7
Örebro	87.8	50.4	98,428	31.5	17.9	14.4	8.1	8.5	7.7	5.7	4.8	1.6
Total	87.7	3.0	195,157	33.1	16.6	18.2	7.8	7.6	6.9	4.6	3.7	1.5
Source: val.se

=== Östergötland ===
Location	Turnout	Share	Votes	S	M	SD	C	V	KD	L	MP	Other
Boxholm	89.1	1.2	3,705	37.7	15.0	19.7	9.6	4.9	5.8	2.7	2.5	2.1
Finspång	87.8	4.7	14,285	36.7	15.1	20.5	6.5	7.4	6.3	3.4	2.5	1.6
Kinda	89.1	2.2	6,664	27.5	16.9	20.6	12.2	5.9	8.0	3.6	3.8	1.6
Linköping	89.2	35.1	105,664	27.6	22.2	13.2	9.7	6.4	6.5	7.2	5.6	1.7
Mjölby	88.6	6.0	18,119	31.7	20.3	19.4	8.2	5.7	6.4	4.4	2.8	1.1
Motala	88.2	9.5	28,450	32.7	19.5	20.3	6.8	6.4	6.2	4.4	2.7	1.0
Norrköping	86.3	29.6	89,045	28.3	20.5	19.6	6.5	8.1	6.4	4.8	4.0	1.7
Söderköping	89.9	3.3	9,955	22.4	21.7	21.9	10.9	5.5	7.8	5.0	3.5	1.3
Vadstena	89.2	1.8	5,327	29.1	22.5	16.9	9.3	5.9	7.3	3.7	3.9	1.4
Valdemarsvik	88.4	1.8	5,379	30.1	17.3	23.3	10.6	5.4	7.2	2.7	2.0	1.4
Ydre	91.3	0.9	2,616	22.9	15.8	20.5	14.9	5.5	12.4	3.6	3.0	1.5
Åtvidaberg	89.3	2.7	8,013	33.4	16.6	21.3	9.7	5.0	5.9	4.0	2.9	1.2
Ödeshög	88.9	1.2	3,556	26.1	16.7	20.9	10.3	4.1	15.1	2.3	2.6	2.0
Total	88.2	4.6	300,778	29.1	20.4	17.6	8.4	6.8	6.7	5.4	4.2	1.6
Source: val.se

== Results by bloc ==
Since the Red-Greens and the Alliance were in existence during the election campaign, the bloc results are presented beneath, although both blocs split in 2019. As a result of the lengthy stalemate in the 2018 Swedish government formation, the Red-Greens and the Alliance blocs both split as two members of each bloc formed the January agreement between the Social Democrats and the Green Party in government and the Centre Party and the Liberals as confidence and supply parties. The latter two, along with the Left Party all chose to abstain in the vote on whether to nominate Stefan Löfven as Prime Minister. Due to the negative parliamentarism being in effect and fewer than 175 voting against, Löfven was able to remain in his position, even though he got fewer "yes" votes than there were "no" votes. The Moderates and Christian Democrats had nominated Ulf Kristersson as Prime Minister, with the Sweden Democrats also voting for him and all three parties voting against Löfven. The following municipal charts are detailing how the eventual PM preference vote share was split in municipalities and are not the same as the aforementioned bloc results.

== Blocs by constituency ==
PM preference

Location	Land	Turnout	Share	Votes	Löfven	Against
Blekinge	G	88.5	1.6	104,514	50.6	48.2
Dalarna	S	87.6	2.9	188,027	55.0	43.5
Gothenburg	G	84.3	5.4	349,645	59.1	38.8
Gotland	G	88.8	0.6	41,129	64.7	33.4
Gävleborg	N	86.3	2.9	185,413	58.6	40.2
Halland	G	89.0	3.4	216,982	50.1	48.6
Jämtland	N	87.1	1.3	85,223	63.8	34.7
Jönköping	G	88.1	3.5	229,580	49.9	48.9
Kalmar	G	88.1	2.5	160,864	53.8	45.0
Kronoberg	G	88.2	1.9	124,570	51.7	47.0
Malmö	G	82.0	3.0	193,298	57.9	40.1
Norrbotten	N	86.7	2.6	166,678	65.4	33.2
Skåne NE	G	86.4	3.1	202,502	43.2	55.5
Skåne S	G	89.4	3.9	252,804	47.0	51.4
Skåne W	G	85.2	3.0	191,506	46.0	52.5
Stockholm (city)	S	87.3	9.4	611,206	61.5	36.6
Stockholm County	S	86.6	12.6	815,031	50.3	48.2
Södermanland	S	86.7	2.8	183,449	53.5	45.2
Uppsala	S	88.9	3.7	241,489	56.7	41.3
Värmland	S	87.3	2.8	183,966	57.9	40.8
Västerbotten	N	87.9	2.8	178,837	68.7	29.7
Västernorrland	N	87.8	2.5	163,001	64.0	34.6
Västmanland	S	86.7	2.7	172,719	53.6	45.1
Västra Götaland E	G	88.2	2.7	177,001	52.9	45.7
Västra Götaland N	G	86.8	2.7	174,573	53.1	45.6
Västra Götaland S	G	87.4	2.2	143,505	52.8	45.9
Västra Götaland W	G	89.6	3.8	243,278	51.1	47.5
Örebro	S	87.7	3.0	195,157	56.8	41.8
Östergötland	G	88.2	4.6	300,778	53.7	44.7
Total		87.2	100.0	6,476,725	54.8	43.7
Source = val.se

By bloc

Location	Land	Turnout	Share	Votes	Left	Right	SD	Won
Blekinge	G	88.5	1.6	104,514	39.8	33.8	25.2	No
Dalarna	S	87.6	2.9	188,027	41.3	36.4	20.8	No
Gothenburg	G	84.3	5.4	349,645	44.7	39.7	13.5	No
Gotland	G	88.8	0.6	41,129	43.8	41.7	12.7	No
Gävleborg	N	86.3	2.9	185,413	45.5	33.6	19.6	No
Halland	G	89.0	3.4	216,982	34.2	48.6	18.6	No
Jämtland	N	87.1	1.3	85,223	45.6	37.4	15.6	No
Jönköping	G	88.1	3.5	229,580	35.9	43.6	19.3	No
Kalmar	G	88.1	2.5	160,864	40.2	38.0	20.6	No
Kronoberg	G	88.2	1.9	124,570	38.8	39.7	20.3	No
Malmö	G	82.0	3.0	193,298	46.6	34.6	16.8	No
Norrbotten	N	86.7	2.6	166,678	55.1	27.7	15.8	Yes
Skåne NE	G	86.4	3.1	202,502	32.0	38.0	28.8	No
Skåne S	G	89.4	3.9	252,804	32.1	44.3	22.1	No
Skåne W	G	85.2	3.0	191,506	34.4	38.0	26.1	No
Stockholm (city)	S	87.3	9.4	611,206	44.6	43.7	9.8	No
Stockholm County	S	86.6	12.6	815,031	34.8	48.5	15.2	No
Södermanland	S	86.7	2.8	183,449	41.7	37.1	19.3	No
Uppsala	S	88.9	3.7	241,489	41.3	41.3	15.4	No
Värmland	S	87.3	2.8	183,966	44.2	36.5	18.0	No
Västerbotten	N	87.9	2.8	178,837	54.7	32.8	10.9	Yes
Västernorrland	N	87.8	2.5	163,001	50.7	32.4	15.6	Yes
Västmanland	S	86.7	2.7	172,719	41.4	37.1	20.1	No
Västra Götaland E	G	88.2	2.7	177,001	39.2	39.9	19.5	No
Västra Götaland N	G	86.8	2.7	174,573	40.5	36.7	21.4	No
Västra Götaland S	G	87.4	2.2	143,505	37.9	41.1	19.7	No
Västra Götaland W	G	89.6	3.8	243,278	36.1	44.5	18.0	No
Örebro	S	87.7	3.0	195,157	44.4	35.9	18.2	No
Östergötland	G	88.2	4.6	300,778	40.0	40.8	17.6	No
Total		87.2	100.0	6,476,725	40.7	40.3	17.5	No
Source = val.se

Post–2021 affiliations

Location	Land	Turnout	Share	Votes	Left/C	Right
Blekinge	G	88.5	1.6	104,514	46.5	52.2
Dalarna	S	87.6	2.9	188,027	51.3	47.2
Gothenburg	G	84.3	5.4	349,645	51.8	46.1
Gotland	G	88.8	0.6	41,129	61.0	37.2
Gävleborg	N	86.3	2.9	185,413	54.6	44.2
Halland	G	89.0	3.4	216,982	44.3	54.3
Jämtland	N	87.1	1.3	85,223	61.0	37.6
Jönköping	G	88.1	3.5	229,580	46.0	52.8
Kalmar	G	88.1	2.5	160,864	50.0	48.8
Kronoberg	G	88.2	1.9	124,570	48.2	50.5
Malmö	G	82.0	3.0	193,298	52.3	45.7
Norrbotten	N	86.7	2.6	166,678	62.2	36.4
Skåne NE	G	86.4	3.1	202,502	38.8	59.9
Skåne S	G	89.4	3.9	252,804	40.0	58.5
Skåne W	G	85.2	3.0	191,506	40.8	57.7
Stockholm (city)	S	87.3	9.4	611,206	53.7	44.4
Stockholm County	S	86.6	12.6	815,031	43.3	55.2
Södermanland	S	86.7	2.8	183,449	49.1	49.5
Uppsala	S	88.9	3.7	241,489	50.5	47.5
Värmland	S	87.3	2.8	183,966	53.5	45.2
Västerbotten	N	87.9	2.8	178,837	64.8	33.6
Västernorrland	N	87.8	2.5	163,001	60.5	38.1
Västmanland	S	86.7	2.7	172,719	48.1	50.5
Västra Götaland E	G	88.2	2.7	177,001	48.6	50.0
Västra Götaland N	G	86.8	2.7	174,573	48.4	50.2
Västra Götaland S	G	87.4	2.2	143,505	47.5	51.2
Västra Götaland W	G	89.6	3.8	243,278	44.3	54.4
Örebro	S	87.7	3.0	195,157	52.2	46.3
Östergötland	G	88.2	4.6	300,778	48.4	50.0
Total		87.2	100.0	6,476,725	49.3	49.2
Source = val.se

== Blocs by municipality ==
=== Blekinge ===
PM preference

Location	Turnout	Share	Votes	Löfven	Against
Karlshamn	87.8	20.5	21,439	52.2	46.4
Karlskrona	89.9	42.4	44,317	52.5	46.1
Olofström	85.0	7.9	8,337	53.0	45.8
Ronneby	87.7	17.8	18,634	47.8	50.9
Sölvesborg	88.3	11.4	11,930	42.4	56.4
Total	88.5	1.6	104,514	50.6	48.2
Source: val.se

By bloc

Location	Turnout	Share	Votes	Left	Right	SD	Won
Karlshamn	87.8	20.5	21,439	42.4	31.9	24.3	No
Karlskrona	89.9	42.4	44,317	40.2	36.9	21.6	No
Olofström	85.0	7.9	8,337	44.2	25.7	28.9	No
Ronneby	87.7	17.8	18,634	37.6	31.7	29.4	No
Sölvesborg	88.3	11.4	11,930	33.6	34.0	31.2	No
Total	88.5	1.6	104,514	39.8	33.8	25.2	No
Source: val.se

=== Dalarna ===
PM preference

Location	Turnout	Share	Votes	Löfven	Against
Avesta	86.7	7.8	14,573	53.2	45.5
Borlänge	87.2	17.3	32,460	56.0	42.5
Falun	88.8	21.0	39,461	57.5	41.0
Gagnef	89.3	3.6	6,901	53.7	44.7
Hedemora	85.8	5.2	9,824	53.6	44.7
Leksand	89.5	5.8	10,944	53.3	45.3
Ludvika	87.1	9.0	16,868	56.6	41.8
Malung-Sälen	87.0	3.6	6,756	49.2	49.5
Mora	86.6	7.3	13,748	53.4	45.0
Orsa	86.7	2.4	4,601	52.6	45.3
Rättvik	87.2	4.1	7,644	51.1	47.3
Smedjebacken	88.1	4.0	7,440	57.4	41.3
Säter	88.9	4.0	7,610	54.2	44.8
Vansbro	86.2	2.4	4,501	54.5	43.8
Älvdalen	86.7	2.5	4,696	53.4	44.8
Total	87.6	2.9	188,027	55.0	43.5
Source:val.se

By bloc

Location	Turnout	Share	Votes	Left	Right	SD	Won
Avesta	86.7	7.8	14,573	43.5	30.5	24.7	No
Borlänge	87.2	17.3	32,460	44.2	34.0	20.3	No
Falun	88.8	21.0	39,461	41.1	42.1	15.3	No
Gagnef	89.3	3.6	6,901	36.3	40.4	21.8	No
Hedemora	85.8	5.2	9,824	40.9	34.8	22.5	No
Leksand	89.5	5.8	10,944	36.8	45.5	16.2	No
Ludvika	87.1	9.0	16,868	46.6	28.7	23.2	No
Malung-Sälen	87.0	3.6	6,756	36.8	37.3	24.6	No
Mora	86.6	7.3	13,748	38.2	37.7	22.5	No
Orsa	86.7	2.4	4,601	39.0	32.3	26.6	No
Rättvik	87.2	4.1	7,644	35.8	39.3	23.4	No
Smedjebacken	88.1	4.0	7,440	48.7	27.2	22.9	No
Säter	88.9	4.0	7,610	38.6	38.7	21.7	No
Vansbro	86.2	2.4	4,501	37.8	39.7	20.8	No
Älvdalen	86.7	2.5	4,696	39.1	30.6	28.5	No
Total	87.6	2.9	188,027	41.3	36.4	20.8	No
Source:val.se

=== Gotland ===
PM preference

Location	Turnout	Share	Votes	Löfven	Against
Gotland	88.8	100.0	41,129	64.7	33.4
Total	88.8	0.6	41,129	64.7	33.4
Source: val.se

By bloc

Location	Turnout	Share	Votes	Left	Right	SD	Won
Gotland	88.8	100.0	41,129	43.8	41.7	12.7	No
Total	88.8	0.6	41,129	43.8	41.7	12.7	No
Source: val.se

=== Gävleborg ===
PM preference

Location	Turnout	Share	Votes	Löfven	Against
Bollnäs	85.5	9.3	17,173	59.5	39.5
Gävle	87.5	35.7	66,241	56.1	42.5
Hofors	84.6	3.3	6,118	61.8	37.1
Hudiksvall	85.6	13.3	24,699	63.0	35.4
Ljusdal	83.7	6.5	12,065	59.3	39.5
Nordanstig	83.6	3.3	6,084	58.3	40.1
Ockelbo	86.2	2.1	3,818	55.4	43.5
Ovanåker	86.2	4.1	7,645	58.6	40.4
Sandviken	87.0	13.4	24,794	58.6	40.3
Söderhamn	86.1	9.0	16,776	60.1	39.0
Total	86.3	2.9	185,413	58.6	40.2
Source: val.se

By bloc

Location	Turnout	Share	Votes	Left	Right	SD	Won
Bollnäs	85.5	9.3	17,173	44.8	34.6	19.6	No
Gävle	87.5	35.7	66,241	44.4	34.8	19.5	No
Hofors	84.6	3.3	6,118	53.0	24.0	21.8	Yes
Hudiksvall	85.6	13.3	24,699	47.6	34.5	16.3	No
Ljusdal	83.7	6.5	12,065	43.6	35.1	20.0	No
Nordanstig	83.6	3.3	6,084	44.1	32.9	21.5	No
Ockelbo	86.2	2.1	3,818	42.1	29.6	27.3	No
Ovanåker	86.2	4.1	7,645	38.9	42.2	17.8	No
Sandviken	87.0	13.4	24,794	47.6	29.8	21.4	No
Söderhamn	86.1	9.0	16,776	47.2	32.3	19.6	No
Total	86.3	2.9	185,413	45.5	33.6	19.6	Yes
Source: val.se

=== Halland ===
PM preference

Location	Turnout	Share	Votes	Löfven	Against
Falkenberg	87.7	13.6	29,472	55.3	43.3
Halmstad	87.4	30.2	65,498	53.2	45.2
Hylte	85.0	2.8	6,056	52.0	46.8
Kungsbacka	91.8	25.8	56,049	41.0	57.7
Laholm	88.0	7.6	16,438	46.4	52.2
Varberg	90.0	20.0	43,469	54.5	44.3
Total	89.0	3.4	216,982	50.1	48.6
Source: val.se

By bloc

Location	Turnout	Share	Votes	Left	Right	SD	Won
Falkenberg	87.7	13.6	29,472	38.7	42.4	17.6	No
Halmstad	87.4	30.2	65,498	39.6	41.1	17.7	No
Hylte	85.0	2.8	6,056	37.1	35.9	25.8	No
Kungsbacka	91.8	25.8	56,049	23.7	55.8	19.3	Yes
Laholm	88.0	7.6	16,438	30.2	42.7	25.7	No
Varberg	90.0	20.0	43,469	37.6	45.1	16.1	No
Total	89.0	3.4	216,982	34.2	48.6	18.6	No
Source: val.se

=== Jämtland ===
PM preference

Location	Turnout	Share	Votes	Löfven	Against
Berg	85.6	5.4	4,610	59.1	39.5
Bräcke	85.0	4.8	4,131	62.6	35.5
Härjedalen	84.5	7.9	6,697	60.6	37.1
Krokom	88.5	11.0	9,391	63.6	35.3
Ragunda	85.4	4.0	3,446	64.7	32.8
Strömsund	84.4	8.8	7,475	63.9	35.1
Åre	88.6	8.6	7,297	64.9	33.4
Östersund	87.9	49.5	42,176	64.7	34.0
Total	87.1	1.3	85,223	63.8	34.7
Source: val.se

By bloc

Location	Turnout	Share	Votes	Left	Right	SD	Won
Berg	85.6	5.4	4,610	40.5	38.4	19.7	No
Bräcke	85.0	4.8	4,131	47.0	32.0	19.2	No
Härjedalen	84.5	7.9	6,697	43.9	35.0	18.8	No
Krokom	88.5	11.0	9,391	42.5	40.8	15.6	No
Ragunda	85.4	4.0	3,446	48.3	28.3	20.9	No
Strömsund	84.4	8.8	7,475	50.2	28.1	20.8	Yes
Åre	88.6	8.6	7,297	40.6	44.5	13.2	No
Östersund	87.9	49.5	42,176	46.8	38.6	13.3	No
Total	87.1	1.3	85,223	45.6	37.4	15.6	No
Source: val.se

=== Jönköping ===
PM preference

Location	Turnout	Share	Votes	Löfven	Against
Aneby	89.9	2.0	4,485	46.4	51.8
Eksjö	88.4	4.9	11,294	51.4	47.1
Gislaved	85.2	7.7	17,752	50.7	48.5
Gnosjö	86.0	2.6	5,855	44.0	55.2
Habo	93.4	3.4	7,746	44.0	54.9
Jönköping	88.3	39.3	90,129	51.5	47.3
Mullsjö	89.6	2.1	4,823	44.3	54.1
Nässjö	88.0	8.4	19,397	49.5	49.1
Sävsjö	87.5	3.1	7,028	39.1	59.9
Tranås	88.5	5.3	12,279	53.3	45.3
Vaggeryd	88.0	3.8	8,813	50.1	48.7
Vetlanda	88.2	7.7	17,711	48.3	50.7
Värnamo	87.7	9.7	22,268	50.9	48.0
Total	88.1	3.5	229,580	49.9	48.9
Source: val.se

By bloc

Location	Turnout	Share	Votes	Left	Right	SD	Won
Aneby	89.9	2.0	4,485	30.3	46.9	21.1	No
Eksjö	88.4	4.9	11,294	34.6	44.3	19.6	No
Gislaved	85.2	7.7	17,752	35.6	41.3	22.3	No
Gnosjö	86.0	2.6	5,855	31.0	46.4	21.8	No
Habo	93.4	3.4	7,746	31.0	47.8	20.0	No
Jönköping	88.3	39.3	90,129	37.7	44.7	16.4	No
Mullsjö	89.6	2.1	4,823	34.7	41.7	22.1	No
Nässjö	88.0	8.4	19,397	37.6	38.1	22.9	No
Sävsjö	87.5	3.1	7,028	26.9	46.6	25.6	No
Tranås	88.5	5.3	12,279	40.1	39.0	19.5	No
Vaggeryd	88.0	3.8	8,813	36.1	42.2	20.4	No
Vetlanda	88.2	7.7	17,711	33.8	42.9	22.1	No
Värnamo	87.7	9.7	22,268	34.7	45.8	18.4	No
Total	88.1	3.5	229,580	35.9	43.6	19.3	No
Source: val.se

=== Kalmar ===
PM preference

Location	Turnout	Share	Votes	Löfven	Against
Borgholm	88.6	4.8	7,682	50.1	48.6
Emmaboda	87.0	3.7	5,919	55.6	42.8
Hultsfred	85.8	5.4	8,661	53.5	45.1
Högsby	85.9	2.2	3,466	49.9	49.2
Kalmar	89.2	28.4	45,641	55.3	43.3
Mönsterås	89.3	5.5	8,911	52.4	46.6
Mörbylånga	91.7	6.4	10,367	52.2	46.4
Nybro	86.6	7.9	12,697	53.6	45.0
Oskarshamn	88.1	11.1	17,870	50.6	48.6
Torsås	88.0	2.9	4,721	50.0	48.9
Vimmerby	88.2	6.4	10,358	53.8	44.8
Västervik	86.3	15.3	24,571	56.5	42.4
Total	88.1	2.5	160,864	53.8	45.0
Source: val.se

By bloc

Location	Turnout	Share	Votes	Left	Right	SD	Won
Borgholm	88.6	4.8	7,682	32.5	44.9	21.4	No
Emmaboda	87.0	3.7	5,919	41.7	34.4	22.3	No
Hultsfred	85.8	5.4	8,661	41.1	35.7	21.8	No
Högsby	85.9	2.2	3,466	38.6	33.8	26.7	No
Kalmar	89.2	28.4	45,641	41.2	40.4	17.1	No
Mönsterås	89.3	5.5	8,911	39.3	33.4	26.3	No
Mörbylånga	91.7	6.4	10,367	37.1	41.0	20.6	No
Nybro	86.6	7.9	12,697	40.5	35.4	22.7	No
Oskarshamn	88.1	11.1	17,870	39.9	37.1	22.2	No
Torsås	88.0	2.9	4,721	35.2	35.0	28.8	No
Vimmerby	88.2	6.4	10,358	38.3	40.1	20.3	No
Västervik	86.3	15.3	24,571	43.8	35.9	19.2	No
Total	88.1	2.5	160,864	40.2	38.0	20.6	No
Source: val.se

=== Kronoberg ===
PM preference

Location	Turnout	Share	Votes	Löfven	Against
Alvesta	88.3	9.9	12,331	48.2	50.3
Lessebo	87.8	4.0	4,962	57.8	41.2
Ljungby	86.9	14.5	18,071	48.1	50.5
Markaryd	85.7	4.8	5,973	39.8	58.6
Tingsryd	86.7	6.3	7,881	47.6	51.1
Uppvidinge	86.8	4.6	5,735	50.5	48.2
Växjö	89.3	47.8	59,550	54.9	43.9
Älmhult	87.7	8.1	10,067	51.9	47.1
Total	88.2	1.9	124,570	51.7	47.0
Source: val.se

By bloc

Location	Turnout	Share	Votes	Left	Right	SD	Won
Alvesta	88.3	9.9	12,331	36.3	37.2	25.1	No
Lessebo	87.8	4.0	4,962	48.0	28.9	22.1	No
Ljungby	86.9	14.5	18,071	35.7	39.5	23.4	No
Markaryd	85.7	4.8	5,973	31.7	35.1	31.5	No
Tingsryd	86.7	6.3	7,881	34.1	37.4	27.1	No
Uppvidinge	86.8	4.6	5,735	36.4	36.0	26.2	No
Växjö	89.3	47.8	59,550	41.4	42.1	15.4	No
Älmhult	87.7	8.1	10,067	37.4	40.2	21.3	No
Total	88.2	1.9	124,570	38.8	39.7	20.3	No
Source: val.se

=== Norrbotten ===
PM preference

Location	Turnout	Share	Votes	Löfven	Against
Arjeplog	84.1	1.1	1,839	62.2	36.3
Arvidsjaur	85.4	2.5	4,175	69.1	29.6
Boden	88.0	11.5	19,110	61.9	36.7
Gällivare	82.3	6.9	11,464	63.0	35.9
Haparanda	72.8	2.6	4,454	55.8	42.6
Jokkmokk	83.4	1.9	3,228	69.9	29.0
Kalix	87.0	6.6	10,971	65.3	33.7
Kiruna	85.8	8.9	14,796	62.4	35.3
Luleå	89.0	31.9	53,182	64.9	33.5
Pajala	81.4	2.3	3,808	65.7	33.3
Piteå	89.8	17.7	29,523	70.5	28.4
Älvsbyn	85.4	3.2	5,306	68.8	29.8
Överkalix	85.1	1.3	2,241	69.1	29.6
Övertorneå	81.0	1.6	2,633	68.2	31.2
Total	86.7	2.6	166,678	65.4	33.2
Source: val.se

By bloc

Location	Turnout	Share	Votes	Left	Right	SD	Won
Arjeplog	84.1	1.1	1,839	51.5	26.6	20.3	Yes
Arvidsjaur	85.4	2.5	4,175	56.1	26.1	16.4	Yes
Boden	88.0	11.5	19,110	52.1	28.8	17.8	Yes
Gällivare	82.3	6.9	11,464	57.3	21.2	20.4	Yes
Haparanda	72.8	2.6	4,454	44.4	29.6	24.5	No
Jokkmokk	83.4	1.9	3,228	62.0	20.1	16.8	Yes
Kalix	87.0	6.6	10,971	56.0	24.6	18.4	Yes
Kiruna	85.8	8.9	14,796	54.5	23.5	19.7	No
Luleå	89.0	31.9	53,182	53.0	32.1	13.4	Yes
Pajala	81.4	2.3	3,808	59.1	23.4	16.5	Yes
Piteå	89.8	17.7	29,523	60.5	26.6	11.8	Yes
Älvsbyn	85.4	3.2	5,306	56.8	25.2	16.6	Yes
Överkalix	85.1	1.3	2,241	58.2	22.1	18.3	Yes
Övertorneå	81.0	1.6	2,633	50.2	33.0	16.2	Yes
Total	86.7	2.6	166,678	55.1	27.7	15.8	Yes
Source: val.se

=== Skåne ===
Skåne County was divided into four separate constituencies, a legacy of the previous divide between Malmöhus and Kristianstad counties before the 1997 merger as well as the large population.

==== Malmö ====
PM preference

Location	Turnout	Share	Votes	Löfven	Against
Malmö	82.0	100.0	193,298	57.9	40.1
Total	82.0	3.0	193,298	57.9	40.1
Source: val.se

By bloc

Location	Turnout	Share	Votes	Left	Right	SD	Won
Malmö	82.0	100.0	193,298	46.6	34.6	16.8	No
Total	82.0	3.0	193,298	46.6	34.6	16.8	No
Source: val.se

==== Skåne NE ====
PM preference

Location	Turnout	Share	Votes	Löfven	Against
Bromölla	88.0	4.0	8,151	42.8	56.2
Båstad	88.9	5.1	10,362	40.4	58.5
Hässleholm	86.5	16.5	33,334	44.2	54.4
Klippan	84.2	5.2	10,535	39.3	59.1
Kristianstad	86.3	26.6	53,957	45.1	53.8
Osby	87.0	4.1	8,385	44.1	54.6
Perstorp	82.0	2.0	4,126	42.1	56.6
Simrishamn	86.7	6.5	13,243	46.5	51.5
Tomelilla	86.2	4.3	8,617	42.8	55.6
Åstorp	82.4	4.3	8,719	42.4	56.4
Ängelholm	87.4	13.9	28,134	42.0	56.9
Örkelljunga	85.3	3.1	6,192	35.4	63.1
Östra Göinge	86.6	4.3	8,747	41.8	57.3
Total	86.4	3.1	202,502	43.2	55.5
Source: val.se

By bloc

Location	Turnout	Share	Votes	Left	Right	SD	Won
Bromölla	88.0	4.0	8,151	36.0	24.7	38.2	No
Båstad	88.9	5.1	10,362	23.6	53.8	21.5	Yes
Hässleholm	86.5	16.5	33,334	33.2	36.3	29.1	No
Klippan	84.2	5.2	10,535	30.4	31.4	36.6	No
Kristianstad	86.3	26.6	53,957	33.1	39.4	26.5	No
Osby	87.0	4.1	8,385	34.4	33.2	31.2	No
Perstorp	82.0	2.0	4,126	34.6	28.8	35.3	No
Simrishamn	86.7	6.5	13,243	33.7	39.3	25.0	No
Tomelilla	86.2	4.3	8,617	30.4	34.8	33.2	No
Åstorp	82.4	4.3	8,719	34.8	29.6	34.5	No
Ängelholm	87.4	13.9	28,134	29.2	45.4	24.2	No
Örkelljunga	85.3	3.1	6,192	26.0	36.9	35.5	No
Östra Göinge	86.6	4.3	8,747	33.5	32.3	33.3	No
Total	86.4	3.1	202,502	32.0	38.0	28.8	No
Source: val.se

==== Skåne S ====
PM preference

Location	Turnout	Share	Votes	Löfven	Against
Burlöv	80.8	4.0	10,010	51.8	46.8
Kävlinge	91.1	8.1	20,396	42.8	55.9
Lomma	93.9	6.5	16,401	42.4	56.6
Lund	89.7	31.5	79,575	61.5	36.1
Sjöbo	86.6	4.9	12,418	34.8	63.6
Skurup	88.2	4.0	10,054	40.5	58.3
Staffanstorp	90.7	6.2	15,733	42.9	55.9
Svedala	90.9	5.4	13,735	39.4	59.3
Trelleborg	86.4	11.3	28,451	41.5	57.4
Vellinge	93.1	10.0	25,245	28.6	70.6
Ystad	88.0	8.2	20,786	45.4	53.4
Total	89.4	3.9	252,804	47.0	51.4
Source: val.se

By bloc

Location	Turnout	Share	Votes	Left	Right	SD	Won
Burlöv	80.8	4.0	10,010	42.0	32.7	23.9	No
Kävlinge	91.1	8.1	20,396	28.8	44.9	25.0	No
Lomma	93.9	6.5	16,401	23.1	58.8	17.1	Yes
Lund	89.7	31.5	79,575	42.0	43.3	12.2	No
Sjöbo	86.6	4.9	12,418	24.8	34.4	39.2	No
Skurup	88.2	4.0	10,054	29.5	36.0	33.3	No
Staffanstorp	90.7	6.2	15,733	28.9	46.9	22.9	No
Svedala	90.9	5.4	13,735	28.0	39.2	31.5	No
Trelleborg	86.4	11.3	28,451	31.3	36.9	30.7	No
Vellinge	93.1	10.0	25,245	14.1	61.5	23.6	Yes
Ystad	88.0	8.2	20,786	32.9	41.7	24.2	No
Total	89.4	3.9	252,804	32.1	44.3	22.1	No
Source: val.se

==== Skåne W ====
PM preference

Location	Turnout	Share	Votes	Löfven	Against
Bjuv	82.7	4.5	8,649	42.1	56.9
Eslöv	86.3	10.8	20,665	47.6	50.4
Helsingborg	84.3	46.2	88,462	46.1	52.6
Höganäs	88.9	9.2	17,613	43.5	55.3
Hörby	86.7	5.3	10,064	39.1	59.3
Höör	88.1	5.6	10,737	44.4	53.5
Landskrona	83.5	14.0	26,783	51.6	47.1
Svalöv	87.7	4.5	8,533	43.3	54.5
Total	85.2	3.0	191,506	46.0	52.5
Source: val.se

By bloc

Location	Turnout	Share	Votes	Left	Right	SD	Won
Bjuv	82.7	4.5	8,649	35.8	24.8	38.4	No
Eslöv	86.3	10.8	20,665	35.9	34.1	28.0	No
Helsingborg	84.3	46.2	88,462	35.0	39.9	23.8	No
Höganäs	88.9	9.2	17,613	28.2	50.1	20.5	Yes
Hörby	86.7	5.3	10,064	26.5	36.5	35.4	No
Höör	88.1	5.6	10,737	31.1	38.6	28.2	No
Landskrona	83.5	14.0	26,783	40.4	32.9	25.4	No
Svalöv	87.7	4.5	8,533	30.3	33.2	34.3	No
Total	85.2	3.0	191,506	34.4	38.0	26.1	No
Source: val.se

=== Stockholm ===
Stockholm was divided into two separate constituencies, Stockholm as a municipality and the rest of the county as "Stockholm County".

==== Stockholm (city) ====
PM preference

Location	Turnout	Share	Votes	Löfven	Against
Stockholm	87.3	100.0	611,206	61.5	36.6
Total	87.3	9.4	611,206	61.5	36.6
Source: val.se

By bloc

Location	Turnout	Share	Votes	Left	Right	SD	Won
Stockholm	87.3	100.0	611,206	44.6	43.7	9.8	No
Total	87.3	9.4	611,206	44.6	43.7	9.8	No
Source: val.se

==== Stockholm County ====
PM preference

Location	Turnout	Share	Votes	Löfven	Against
Botkyrka	78.2	5.6	45,393	55.6	42.7
Danderyd	91.9	2.7	21,897	36.6	62.0
Ekerö	92.2	2.2	17,814	46.5	52.2
Haninge	85.1	6.2	50,484	50.2	48.2
Huddinge	84.9	7.5	61,440	53.7	44.6
Järfälla	86.3	5.6	45,654	53.3	45.2
Lidingö	90.2	3.8	31,032	43.4	55.6
Nacka	90.0	7.9	64,101	53.0	45.6
Norrtälje	87.1	5.1	41,174	50.5	48.0
Nykvarn	90.7	0.8	6,847	41.1	57.9
Nynäshamn	86.5	2.2	17,642	48.7	49.9
Salem	87.8	1.2	9,985	48.7	49.7
Sigtuna	83.0	3.1	25,576	46.9	51.5
Sollentuna	88.6	5.4	43,676	51.7	46.8
Solna	87.4	6.2	50,510	57.4	40.8
Sundbyberg	85.6	3.7	29,807	58.7	39.6
Södertälje	77.5	5.9	48,273	49.7	48.5
Tyresö	90.3	3.7	30,260	50.5	47.9
Täby	91.1	5.7	46,386	43.0	55.7
Upplands-Bro	86.8	2.0	16,366	47.5	50.8
Upplands Väsby	84.7	3.2	25,830	50.8	47.9
Vallentuna	90.0	2.6	20,952	46.1	52.5
Vaxholm	92.7	1.0	8,106	47.6	51.3
Värmdö	90.3	3.4	28,115	48.1	50.6
Österåker	89.3	3.4	27,711	46.0	52.9
Total	86.6	12.6	815,031	50.3	48.2
Source: val.se

By bloc

Location	Turnout	Share	Votes	Left	Right	SD	Won
Botkyrka	78.2	5.6	45,393	46.0	36.2	16.1	No
Danderyd	91.9	2.7	21,897	14.2	74.2	10.3	Yes
Ekerö	92.2	2.2	17,814	27.6	54.9	16.2	Yes
Haninge	85.1	6.2	50,484	39.0	39.5	19.9	No
Huddinge	84.9	7.5	61,440	40.1	43.1	15.2	No
Järfälla	86.3	5.6	45,654	41.0	42.6	15.0	No
Lidingö	90.2	3.8	31,032	20.8	67.2	11.0	Yes
Nacka	90.0	7.9	64,101	32.5	55.4	10.8	Yes
Norrtälje	87.1	5.1	41,174	36.2	42.5	19.9	No
Nykvarn	90.7	0.8	6,847	28.9	45.5	24.6	No
Nynäshamn	86.5	2.2	17,642	37.8	37.8	23.1	No
Salem	87.8	1.2	9,985	33.5	48.0	16.9	No
Sigtuna	83.0	3.1	25,576	35.3	43.8	19.3	No
Sollentuna	88.6	5.4	43,676	32.6	54.8	11.2	Yes
Solna	87.4	6.2	50,510	40.2	46.7	11.3	No
Sundbyberg	85.6	3.7	29,807	43.6	42.5	12.2	No
Södertälje	77.5	5.9	48,273	39.4	41.3	17.5	No
Tyresö	90.3	3.7	30,260	35.7	46.5	16.3	No
Täby	91.1	5.7	46,386	21.3	66.0	11.4	Yes
Upplands-Bro	86.8	2.0	16,366	36.1	42.1	20.1	No
Upplands Väsby	84.7	3.2	25,830	38.9	41.8	18.0	No
Vallentuna	90.0	2.6	20,952	28.2	53.7	16.6	Yes
Vaxholm	92.7	1.0	8,106	26.6	51.3	13.1	Yes
Värmdö	90.3	3.4	28,115	31.9	49.5	17.2	Yes
Österåker	89.3	3.4	27,711	29.1	53.6	16.1	Yes
Total	86.6	12.6	815,031	34.8	48.5	15.2	No
Source: val.se

=== Södermanland ===
PM preference

Location	Turnout	Share	Votes	Löfven	Against
Eskilstuna	84.7	34.2	62,678	53.0	45.7
Flen	86.0	5.5	10,118	54.9	43.7
Gnesta	88.4	3.9	7,217	53.6	44.1
Katrineholm	86.7	11.8	21,583	58.4	40.4
Nyköping	88.7	20.0	36,687	55.9	42.6
Oxelösund	86.7	4.1	7,545	59.1	39.4
Strängnäs	88.4	12.5	22,844	46.4	52.4
Trosa	90.5	4.8	8,864	46.7	52.2
Vingåker	88.5	3.2	5,913	52.9	46.2
Total	86.7	2.8	183,449	53.5	45.2
Source: val.se

By bloc

Location	Turnout	Share	Votes	Left	Right	SD	Won
Eskilstuna	84.7	34.2	62,678	42.3	35.4	21.0	No
Flen	86.0	5.5	10,118	43.4	33.9	21.3	No
Gnesta	88.4	3.9	7,217	39.4	39.5	18.8	No
Katrineholm	86.7	11.8	21,583	46.6	34.5	17.8	No
Nyköping	88.7	20.0	36,687	42.9	39.6	16.1	No
Oxelösund	86.7	4.1	7,545	51.6	28.2	18.8	Yes
Strängnäs	88.4	12.5	22,844	33.4	45.6	19.8	No
Trosa	90.5	4.8	8,864	32.8	47.3	18.8	No
Vingåker	88.5	3.2	5,913	43.2	31.5	24.4	No
Total	86.7	2.8	183,449	41.7	37.1	19.3	No
Source: val.se

=== Uppsala ===
PM preference

Location	Turnout	Share	Votes	Löfven	Against
Enköping	87.7	11.8	28,462	48.5	49.8
Heby	86.7	3.8	9,064	53.2	44.7
Håbo	89.1	5.5	13,395	41.6	57.2
Knivsta	91.3	4.7	11,276	49.6	48.8
Tierp	87.5	5.7	13,802	57.7	40.1
Uppsala	89.5	59.9	144,667	61.0	36.8
Älvkarleby	87.5	2.5	6,009	56.1	42.7
Östhammar	86.7	6.1	14,814	51.4	47.0
Total	88.9	3.7	241,489	56.7	41.3
Source: val.se

By bloc

Location	Turnout	Share	Votes	Left	Right	SD	Won
Enköping	87.7	11.8	28,462	33.9	44.1	20.4	No
Heby	86.7	3.8	9,064	37.0	38.0	22.9	No
Håbo	89.1	5.5	13,395	29.1	45.5	24.2	No
Knivsta	91.3	4.7	11,276	31.7	49.8	16.9	Yes
Tierp	87.5	5.7	13,802	43.2	33.7	20.9	No
Uppsala	89.5	59.9	144,667	44.7	41.7	11.5	No
Älvkarleby	87.5	2.5	6,009	48.3	23.8	26.7	No
Östhammar	86.7	6.1	14,814	38.5	38.7	21.1	No
Total	88.9	3.7	241,489	41.3	41.3	15.4	No
Source: val.se

=== Värmland ===
PM preference

Location	Turnout	Share	Votes	Löfven	Against
Arvika	85.9	9.2	16,961	58.9	39.3
Eda	82.4	2.4	4,329	53.8	44.8
Filipstad	83.6	3.5	6,392	57.0	41.8
Forshaga	88.8	4.1	7,600	58.7	39.9
Grums	86.0	3.2	5,876	57.6	40.6
Hagfors	84.1	4.1	7,607	67.3	31.8
Hammarö	91.0	5.9	10,916	59.4	39.7
Karlstad	89.0	34.4	63,334	58.6	40.0
Kil	89.0	4.4	8,060	55.8	43.2
Kristinehamn	86.8	8.7	16,088	58.9	39.8
Munkfors	85.1	1.3	2,340	70.7	27.7
Storfors	87.1	1.4	2,622	60.0	38.6
Sunne	87.4	4.8	8,810	55.1	43.6
Säffle	86.2	5.4	9,896	51.6	47.5
Torsby	83.7	4.1	7,509	58.1	40.5
Årjäng	84.2	3.1	5,626	44.1	54.9
Total	87.3	2.8	183,966	57.9	40.8
Source: val.se

By bloc

Location	Turnout	Share	Votes	Left	Right	SD	Won
Arvika	85.9	9.2	16,961	45.9	33.8	18.5	No
Eda	82.4	2.4	4,329	40.7	34.9	23.0	No
Filipstad	83.6	3.5	6,392	49.8	23.5	25.6	Yes
Forshaga	88.8	4.1	7,600	48.0	30.1	20.5	No
Grums	86.0	3.2	5,876	48.4	26.6	23.2	No
Hagfors	84.1	4.1	7,607	57.1	24.0	18.0	Yes
Hammarö	91.0	5.9	10,916	44.0	41.9	13.2	No
Karlstad	89.0	34.4	63,334	44.5	40.0	14.1	No
Kil	89.0	4.4	8,060	41.1	36.7	21.3	No
Kristinehamn	86.8	8.7	16,088	44.7	36.1	18.0	No
Munkfors	85.1	1.3	2,340	59.7	23.3	15.4	Yes
Storfors	87.1	1.4	2,622	48.8	27.3	22.5	No
Sunne	87.4	4.8	8,810	36.0	43.8	18.8	No
Säffle	86.2	5.4	9,896	34.3	39.7	25.1	No
Torsby	83.7	4.1	7,509	43.9	33.4	21.4	No
Årjäng	84.2	3.1	5,626	30.7	43.3	25.1	No
Total	87.3	2.8	183,966	44.2	36.5	18.0	No
Source: val.se

=== Västerbotten ===
PM preference

Location	Turnout	Share	Votes	Löfven	Against
Bjurholm	84.9	0.9	1,587	55.4	44.2
Dorotea	84.6	1.0	1,720	74.1	23.4
Lycksele	84.5	4.4	7,787	60.9	37.9
Malå	85.0	1.1	1,961	70.1	29.0
Nordmaling	85.8	2.6	4,656	63.6	35.1
Norsjö	83.8	1.4	2,558	68.1	30.1
Robertsfors	87.1	2.5	4,489	71.9	26.5
Skellefteå	87.9	27.4	48,964	70.3	28.5
Sorsele	80.8	0.8	1,514	64.5	33.4
Storuman	83.2	2.1	3,800	61.7	36.9
Umeå	89.6	47.3	84,574	69.9	28.4
Vilhelmina	84.4	2.4	4,376	65.2	31.0
Vindeln	85.0	1.9	3,431	59.8	38.2
Vännäs	86.6	3.1	5,615	66.7	31.9
Åsele	85.4	1.0	1,805	69.4	29.0
Total	87.9	2.8	178,837	68.7	29.7
Source: val.se

By bloc

Location	Turnout	Share	Votes	Left	Right	SD	Won
Bjurholm	84.9	0.9	1,587	35.7	45.2	18.7	No
Dorotea	84.6	1.0	1,720	55.6	29.5	12.3	Yes
Lycksele	84.5	4.4	7,787	49.8	35.2	13.8	Yes
Malå	85.0	1.1	1,961	58.2	26.5	14.4	Yes
Nordmaling	85.8	2.6	4,656	46.8	35.7	16.3	No
Norsjö	83.8	1.4	2,558	53.3	31.9	13.0	Yes
Robertsfors	87.1	2.5	4,489	51.0	36.5	10.9	Yes
Skellefteå	87.9	27.4	48,964	58.1	29.0	11.7	Yes
Sorsele	80.8	0.8	1,514	50.4	32.0	15.5	Yes
Storuman	83.2	2.1	3,800	47.3	34.4	17.0	Yes
Umeå	89.6	47.3	84,574	55.7	33.8	8.6	Yes
Vilhelmina	84.4	2.4	4,376	49.2	30.8	16.3	No
Vindeln	85.0	1.9	3,431	42.6	39.4	16.0	No
Vännäs	86.6	3.1	5,615	50.8	34.6	13.2	Yes
Åsele	85.4	1.0	1,805	50.0	32.8	15.5	Yes
Total	87.9	2.8	178,837	54.7	32.8	10.9	Yes
Source: val.se

=== Västernorrland ===
PM preference

Location	Turnout	Share	Votes	Löfven	Against
Härnösand	87.3	10.0	16,284	63.0	35.2
Kramfors	86.2	7.4	12,066	69.2	29.1
Sollefteå	86.5	7.7	12,631	66.5	32.0
Sundsvall	88.2	40.4	65,922	61.4	37.2
Timrå	87.5	7.4	12,032	62.8	36.3
Ånge	85.6	3.9	6,280	59.9	38.3
Örnsköldsvik	88.6	23.2	37,786	67.5	31.4
Total	87.8	2.5	163,001	64.0	34.6
Source: val.se

By bloc

Location	Turnout	Share	Votes	Left	Right	SD	Won
Härnösand	87.3	10.0	16,284	49.8	31.5	16.8	Yes
Kramfors	86.2	7.4	12,066	54.7	27.8	15.8	Yes
Sollefteå	86.5	7.7	12,631	52.1	27.8	18.7	Yes
Sundsvall	88.2	40.4	65,922	48.3	34.6	15.6	No
Timrå	87.5	7.4	12,032	53.0	26.7	19.4	Yes
Ånge	85.6	3.9	6,280	49.8	26.3	22.1	Yes
Örnsköldsvik	88.6	23.2	37,786	52.7	34.7	11.5	Yes
Total	87.8	2.5	163,001	50.7	32.4	15.6	Yes
Source: val.se

=== Västmanland ===
PM preference

Location	Turnout	Share	Votes	Löfven	Against
Arboga	87.5	5.3	9,233	53.4	45.5
Fagersta	84.3	4.5	7,825	57.0	41.8
Hallstahammar	85.8	5.8	10,063	55.6	43.0
Kungsör	88.3	3.1	5,370	52.3	46.2
Köping	85.9	9.5	16,390	53.4	45.4
Norberg	86.7	2.2	3,742	58.0	39.8
Sala	88.2	8.7	14,958	54.1	44.3
Skinnskatteberg	85.4	1.7	2,865	58.6	39.9
Surahammar	85.1	3.6	6,241	53.9	44.7
Västerås	86.9	55.6	96,032	52.8	45.9
Total	86.7	2.7	172,719	53.6	45.1
Source: val.se

By bloc

Location	Turnout	Share	Votes	Left	Right	SD	Won
Arboga	87.5	5.3	9,233	42.7	34.5	21.7	No
Fagersta	84.3	4.5	7,825	49.6	26.1	23.0	Yes
Hallstahammar	85.8	5.8	10,063	46.3	29.0	23.3	No
Kungsör	88.3	3.1	5,370	39.4	35.2	23.9	No
Köping	85.9	9.5	16,390	43.3	31.6	23.9	No
Norberg	86.7	2.2	3,742	48.6	27.7	21.6	No
Sala	88.2	8.7	14,958	38.2	37.9	22.2	No
Skinnskatteberg	85.4	1.7	2,865	47.1	26.2	25.2	No
Surahammar	85.1	3.6	6,241	46.5	24.5	27.5	No
Västerås	86.9	55.6	96,032	39.7	41.5	17.5	No
Total	86.7	2.7	172,719	41.4	37.1	20.1	No
Source: val.se

=== Västra Götaland ===
Västra Götaland was divided into five separate constituencies, one covering the city of Gothenburg and the other three being geographically distributed between south, north, east and west.

==== Gothenburg ====
PM preference

Location	Turnout	Share	Votes	Löfven	Against
Gothenburg	84.3	100.0	349,645	59.1	38.8
Total	84.3	5.4	349,645	59.1	38.8
Source: val.se

By bloc

Location	Turnout	Share	Votes	Left	Right	SD	Won
Gothenburg	84.3	100.0	349,645	44.7	39.7	13.5	No
Total	84.3	5.4	349,645	44.7	39.7	13.5	No
Source: val.se

==== Västra Götaland E ====
PM preference

Location	Turnout	Share	Votes	Löfven	Against
Essunga	88.0	2.1	3,764	48.7	50.2
Falköping	87.4	11.9	21,120	51.1	46.8
Grästorp	88.9	2.2	3,952	47.4	51.5
Gullspång	86.1	1.9	3,389	54.6	43.2
Götene	89.2	5.0	8,860	55.0	43.8
Hjo	88.9	3.5	6,236	51.0	47.8
Karlsborg	90.6	2.7	4,856	51.7	47.1
Lidköping	89.5	15.4	27,303	57.0	41.9
Mariestad	87.5	9.3	16,409	54.0	44.8
Skara	87.7	6.9	12,250	52.1	46.5
Skövde	88.0	20.7	36,654	52.3	45.9
Tibro	88.1	4.1	7,176	52.0	47.1
Tidaholm	88.6	4.9	8,589	56.9	42.0
Töreboda	87.0	3.4	5,938	51.1	47.0
Vara	87.4	5.9	10,505	46.9	51.7
Total	88.2	2.7	177,001	52.9	45.7
Source: val.se

By blocs

Location	Turnout	Share	Votes	Left	Right	SD	Won
Essunga	88.0	2.1	3,764	34.0	42.0	22.9	No
Falköping	87.4	11.9	21,120	38.2	39.5	20.9	No
Grästorp	88.9	2.2	3,952	30.9	44.7	23.2	No
Gullspång	86.1	1.9	3,389	43.6	30.4	23.9	No
Götene	89.2	5.0	8,860	40.9	39.0	18.9	No
Hjo	88.9	3.5	6,236	37.2	42.1	19.5	No
Karlsborg	90.6	2.7	4,856	35.7	40.7	22.5	No
Lidköping	89.5	15.4	27,303	43.2	38.4	17.3	No
Mariestad	87.5	9.3	16,409	42.1	39.2	17.6	No
Skara	87.7	6.9	12,250	40.0	38.3	20.2	No
Skövde	88.0	20.7	36,654	37.8	43.4	16.9	No
Tibro	88.1	4.1	7,176	38.1	39.8	21.1	No
Tidaholm	88.6	4.9	8,589	46.0	31.3	21.5	No
Töreboda	87.0	3.4	5,938	37.2	37.9	23.1	No
Vara	87.4	5.9	10,505	31.7	43.3	23.7	No
Total	88.2	2.7	177,001	39.2	39.9	19.5	No
Source: val.se

==== Västra Götaland N ====
PM preference

Location	Turnout	Share	Votes	Löfven	Against
Bengtsfors	85.4	3.4	6,013	51.3	47.6
Dals-Ed	85.6	1.7	2,936	44.9	53.7
Färgelanda	87.3	2.5	4,300	47.7	51.0
Lysekil	87.5	5.7	9,885	55.8	42.9
Mellerud	86.1	3.3	5,783	46.8	52.0
Munkedal	86.2	3.8	6,674	47.2	51.4
Orust	89.0	6.2	10,740	51.2	47.3
Sotenäs	88.2	3.8	6,592	45.5	53.4
Strömstad	84.0	4.2	7,328	51.3	46.9
Tanum	87.5	4.9	8,574	49.2	49.1
Trollhättan	86.4	21.0	36,609	58.6	40.2
Uddevalla	86.7	20.6	35,969	52.5	46.0
Vänersborg	87.8	14.5	25,261	53.9	44.8
Åmål	84.8	4.5	7,909	55.7	42.9
Total	86.8	2.7	174,573	53.1	45.6
Source: val.se

By blocs

Location	Turnout	Share	Votes	Left	Right	SD	Won
Bengtsfors	85.4	3.4	6,013	39.4	33.6	25.9	No
Dals-Ed	85.6	1.7	2,936	29.3	42.2	27.0	No
Färgelanda	87.3	2.5	4,300	32.7	34.1	32.1	No
Lysekil	87.5	5.7	9,885	43.3	33.6	21.8	No
Mellerud	86.1	3.3	5,783	32.1	38.2	28.6	No
Munkedal	86.2	3.8	6,674	34.8	36.3	27.4	No
Orust	89.0	6.2	10,740	35.9	41.4	21.3	No
Sotenäs	88.2	3.8	6,592	32.3	46.1	20.5	No
Strömstad	84.0	4.2	7,328	36.3	41.0	20.9	No
Tanum	87.5	4.9	8,574	31.3	47.5	19.5	No
Trollhättan	86.4	21.0	36,609	47.5	33.9	17.4	No
Uddevalla	86.7	20.6	35,969	41.0	36.9	20.6	No
Vänersborg	87.8	14.5	25,261	42.1	34.5	22.1	No
Åmål	84.8	4.5	7,909	44.7	30.6	23.2	No
Total	86.8	2.7	174,573	40.5	36.7	21.4	No
Source: val.se

==== Västra Götaland S ====
PM preference

Location	Turnout	Share	Votes	Löfven	Against
Bollebygd	90.7	4.3	6,209	47.1	51.8
Borås	86.4	48.7	69,904	53.2	45.5
Herrljunga	88.9	4.4	6,362	50.8	47.4
Mark	88.0	15.9	22,770	55.8	42.9
Svenljunga	87.0	4.8	6,884	48.2	49.8
Tranemo	88.2	5.4	7,682	55.0	43.9
Ulricehamn	88.3	11.2	16,096	51.5	47.2
Vårgårda	89.4	5.3	7,598	50.8	47.9
Total	87.4	2.2	143,505	52.8	45.9
Source:val.se

By blocs

Location	Turnout	Share	Votes	Left	Right	SD	Won
Bollebygd	90.7	4.3	6,209	32.6	42.4	23.9	No
Borås	86.4	48.7	69,904	40.2	40.1	18.4	No
Herrljunga	88.9	4.4	6,362	33.6	42.8	21.8	No
Mark	88.0	15.9	22,770	39.7	39.2	19.8	No
Svenljunga	87.0	4.8	6,884	32.0	40.4	25.6	No
Tranemo	88.2	5.4	7,682	37.2	42.0	19.8	No
Ulricehamn	88.3	11.2	16,096	33.5	45.6	19.6	No
Vårgårda	89.4	5.3	7,598	34.0	44.1	20.6	No
Total	87.4	2.2	143,505	37.9	41.1	19.7	No
Source:val.se

==== Västra Götaland W ====
PM preference

Location	Turnout	Share	Votes	Löfven	Against
Ale	87.9	7.9	19,330	51.3	47.3
Alingsås	89.8	11.3	27,571	56.4	42.2
Härryda	90.8	9.9	24,181	50.4	48.1
Kungälv	90.6	12.4	30,254	50.3	48.4
Lerum	91.3	11.2	27,360	50.8	47.9
Lilla Edet	84.8	3.5	8,631	49.4	49.3
Mölndal	89.3	18.1	43,933	53.7	44.6
Partille	87.9	9.9	24,080	52.3	46.4
Stenungsund	89.9	7.2	17,509	48.9	49.9
Tjörn	90.4	4.6	11,259	44.0	54.7
Öckerö	91.8	3.8	9,170	40.2	58.9
Total	89.6	3.8	243,278	51.1	47.5
Source:val.se

By blocs

Location	Turnout	Share	Votes	Left	Right	SD	Won
Ale	87.9	7.9	19,330	39.5	36.8	22.3	No
Alingsås	89.8	11.3	27,571	39.9	43.4	15.3	No
Härryda	90.8	9.9	24,181	32.9	47.9	17.7	No
Kungälv	90.6	12.4	30,254	35.6	44.6	18.6	No
Lerum	91.3	11.2	27,360	34.8	46.9	17.0	No
Lilla Edet	84.8	3.5	8,631	38.9	30.0	29.8	No
Mölndal	89.3	18.1	43,933	37.4	45.1	15.8	No
Partille	87.9	9.9	24,080	37.2	45.2	16.3	No
Stenungsund	89.9	7.2	17,509	35.4	44.2	19.3	No
Tjörn	90.4	4.6	11,259	29.5	48.5	20.8	No
Öckerö	91.8	3.8	9,170	28.2	53.4	17.5	Yes
Total	89.6	3.8	243,278	36.1	44.5	18.0	No
Source:val.se

=== Örebro ===
PM preference

Location	Turnout	Share	Votes	Löfven	Against
Askersund	88.6	4.0	7,818	52.2	46.5
Degerfors	87.1	3.3	6,415	64.4	34.5
Hallsberg	88.6	5.2	10,200	57.1	41.4
Hällefors	84.1	2.2	4,289	58.7	39.9
Karlskoga	87.1	10.2	19,899	57.5	41.2
Kumla	88.6	7.1	13,948	52.9	45.9
Laxå	86.8	1.9	3,665	53.2	45.6
Lekeberg	90.8	2.7	5,293	50.1	48.3
Lindesberg	87.6	7.8	15,280	51.6	46.8
Ljusnarsberg	83.7	1.5	3,000	51.3	46.7
Nora	86.9	3.5	6,922	55.9	42.4
Örebro	87.8	50.4	98,428	58.4	40.0
Total	87.7	3.0	195,157	56.8	41.8
Source: val.se

By blocs

Location	Turnout	Share	Votes	Left	Right	SD	Won
Askersund	88.6	4.0	7,818	39.9	35.4	23.3	No
Degerfors	87.1	3.3	6,415	56.6	22.4	19.9	Yes
Hallsberg	88.6	5.2	10,200	46.0	30.8	21.7	No
Hällefors	84.1	2.2	4,289	50.5	23.4	24.7	Yes
Karlskoga	87.1	10.2	19,899	47.5	32.8	18.3	No
Kumla	88.6	7.1	13,948	40.9	36.9	21.1	No
Laxå	86.8	1.9	3,665	44.0	30.7	24.2	No
Lekeberg	90.8	2.7	5,293	33.9	40.6	23.9	No
Lindesberg	87.6	7.8	15,280	40.2	33.1	25.0	No
Ljusnarsberg	83.7	1.5	3,000	42.7	24.2	31.2	No
Nora	86.9	3.5	6,922	43.4	33.5	21.4	No
Örebro	87.8	50.4	98,428	44.7	39.3	14.4	No
Total	87.7	3.0	195,157	44.4	35.9	18.2	No
Source: val.se

=== Östergötland ===
PM preference

Location	Turnout	Share	Votes	Löfven	Against
Boxholm	89.1	1.2	3,705	57.4	40.5
Finspång	87.8	4.7	14,285	56.5	41.9
Kinda	89.1	2.2	6,664	52.9	45.5
Linköping	89.2	35.1	105,664	56.4	41.9
Mjölby	88.6	6.0	18,119	52.8	46.1
Motala	88.2	9.5	28,450	52.9	46.1
Norrköping	86.3	29.6	89,045	51.8	46.5
Söderköping	89.9	3.3	9,955	47.3	51.4
Vadstena	89.2	1.8	5,327	51.9	46.7
Valdemarsvik	88.4	1.8	5,379	50.8	47.8
Ydre	91.3	0.9	2,616	49.8	48.7
Åtvidaberg	89.3	2.7	8,013	55.0	43.8
Ödeshög	88.9	1.2	3,556	45.4	52.6
Total	88.2	4.6	300,778	53.7	44.7
Source: val.se

By bloc

Location	Turnout	Share	Votes	Left	Right	SD	Won
Boxholm	89.1	1.2	3,705	45.1	33.1	19.7	No
Finspång	87.8	4.7	14,285	46.6	31.3	20.5	No
Kinda	89.1	2.2	6,664	37.2	40.6	20.6	No
Linköping	89.2	35.1	105,664	39.6	45.5	13.2	No
Mjölby	88.6	6.0	18,119	40.2	39.3	19.4	No
Motala	88.2	9.5	28,450	41.7	37.0	20.3	No
Norrköping	86.3	29.6	89,045	40.5	38.2	19.6	No
Söderköping	89.9	3.3	9,955	31.4	45.4	21.9	No
Vadstena	89.2	1.8	5,327	38.9	42.9	16.9	No
Valdemarsvik	88.4	1.8	5,379	37.5	37.8	23.3	No
Ydre	91.3	0.9	2,616	31.3	46.8	20.5	No
Åtvidaberg	89.3	2.7	8,013	41.3	36.2	21.3	No
Ödeshög	88.9	1.2	3,556	32.8	44.3	20.9	No
Total	88.2	4.6	300,778	40.0	40.8	17.6	No
Source: val.se

== School election ==
During the two weeks before the election, school pupils could vote in their schools. These votes do not count in the real elections. They exist for educational purposes and are counted for statistical and feedback purposes.

Party	Votes (%)	Swing
Moderates	21.23	−0.04
Social Democrats	19.53	−5.57
Sweden Democrats	15.50	+3.34
Centre Party	12.15	+4.94
Green Party	10.27	−4.31
Left Party	8.99	+3.76
Liberals	5.04	−1.12
Christian Democrats	3.96	+1.52
Feminist Initiative	1.78	−1.07
Other parties	1.55	+0.53

Total participation in the school election 2018 was 391,045 which is 79.8%. Of these votes 0.71% were blank and 0.29% were invalid votes for non-registered or non-existing parties.
