= Opinion polling for the 2018 Swedish general election =

In the run up to the 2018 general election of 9 September 2018 in Sweden, various organisations carried out opinion polling to gauge voting intentions. Results of such polls are displayed in this article.

The date range for these opinion polls are from the previous general election, held on 14 September 2014, to the present day.

List of political parties in Sweden shows the abbreviations used here.

== Graphical summary ==
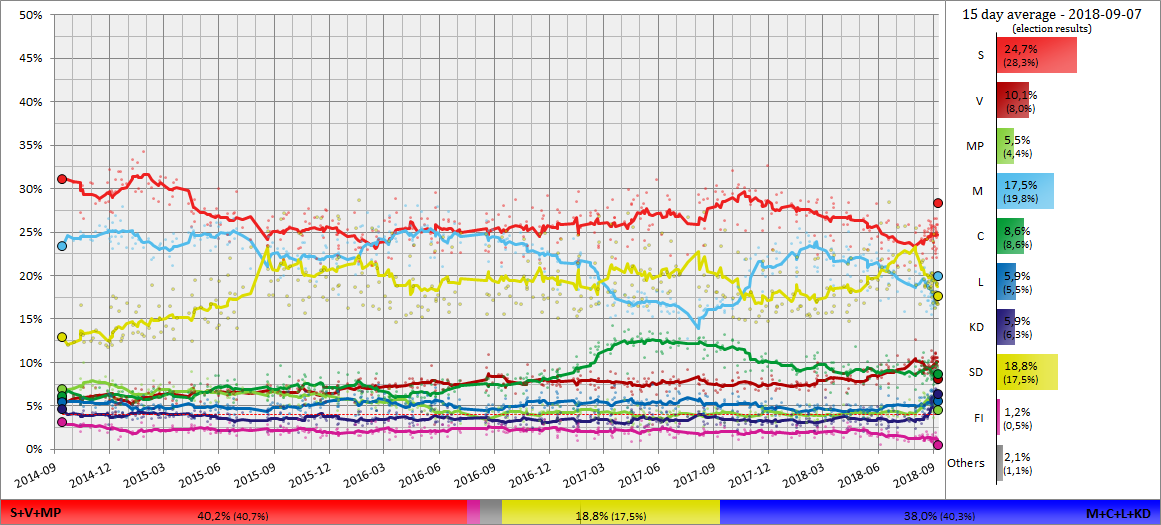

== Poll results ==
=== Parties ===
Poll results are listed in the table below in reverse chronological order, showing the most recent first, and using the date the survey's fieldwork was done, as opposed to the date of publication. If such date is unknown, the date of publication is given instead. The highest percentage figure in each polling survey is displayed in bold, and the background shaded in the leading party's colour. In the instance that there is a tie, then no figure is shaded. The lead column on the right shows the percentage-point difference between the two parties with the highest figures. When a specific poll does not show a data figure for a party, the party's cell corresponding to that poll is shown empty.

See also the projected results by coalition below.

Fieldwork date	Polling firm	S	M	SD	MP	C	V	L	KD	Fi	Others	Lead
9 Sep 2018	General election	**28.3**	19.8	17.5	4.4	8.6	8.0	5.5	6.3	0.5	1.4	8.5
3–7 Sep 2018	Inizio	**24.6**	19.6	16.8	5.2	9.4	9.6	5.8	5.9	1.1	2.0	5.0
2–7 Sep 2018	SKOP	**25.9**	17.6	17.4	4.6	7.9	10.6	6.5	6.4	1.1	2.0	8.3
6 Sep 2018	Novus	**24.9**	17.7	19.1	5.0	8.6	10.0	6.5	5.7	2.5		5.8
5–6 Sep 2018	Sifo	**24.4**	16.9	17.0	6.2	10.0	10.0	6.0	6.3	3.2		7.4
1 Sep–6 Sep 2018	Demoskop	**26.5**	17.9	17.2	5.3	8.2	9.8	6.2	6.0	1.3	1.5	8.6
30 Aug–6 Sep 2018	SKOP	**23.1**	17.3	17.7	5.7	7.9	10.6	6.2	6.9	0.8	3.8	5.4
3–5 Sep 2018	Sifo	**25.1**	17.2	16.9	6.2	10.0	10.1	6.0	5.9	2.7		7.9
29 Aug–5 Sep 2018	SKOP	**22.1**	18.2	19.2	5.6	7.7	10.6	5.9	6.6	1.1	3.0	2.9
30 Aug–4 Sep 2018	Sifo	**25.0**	17.2	17.1	5.4	9.3	10.2	6.8	6.6	2.7		7.8
30 Aug–4 Sep 2018	Demoskop	**25.5**	17.8	18.2	4.8	8.9	9.4	6.2	5.9	1.9	1.5	7.3
28 Aug–4 Sep 2018	SKOP	**22.5**	17.1	20.0	5.5	8.1	11.0	5.4	7.0	1.2	2.2	2.5
29 Aug–3 Sep 2018	Sifo	**25.3**	17.0	17.2	5.4	8.4	11.1	6.7	6.0	2.9		8.1
3 Sep 2018	Ipsos	**26.5**	16.9	16.3	5.0	9.6	10.7	5.9	6.3	2.8		9.6
29 Aug–3 Sep 2018	Inizio	**24.6**	19.2	17.3	5.0	8.4	9.4	6.0	6.5	1.5	2.1	5.4
27 Aug–3 Sep 2018	SKOP	**22.9**	16.3	20.3	6.2	8.0	11.0	4.9	6.8	1.1	2.4	2.6
28 Aug–2 Sep 2018	Sifo	**25.6**	16.8	18.1	5.3	9.0	10.5	6.3	5.3	3.0		7.5
26 Aug–2 Sep 2018	SKOP	**23.3**	16.9	19.7	6.3	7.8	10.5	5.4	6.6	1.2	2.3	3.6
30 Aug–1 Sep 2018	YouGov	23.8	16.5	**24.8**	3.6	6.0	9.4	5.7	4.8	0.6	4.8	1.0
25–31 Aug 2018	SKOP	**23.8**	17.0	20.0	6.2	7.5	10.5	5.4	6.7	1.2	1.9	3.8
23–30 Aug 2018	Demoskop	**24.5**	17.1	19.8	5.1	9.5	9.5	6.8	4.8	0.8	1.9	4.7
30 Aug 2018	Sentio	22.1	18.2	**24.0**	4.4	6.0	10.7	5.2	5.0			1.9
28–30 Aug 2018	Sifo	**25.7**	16.8	16.9	6.9	9.5	10.5	5.5	5.5	3.3		8.8
25–30 Aug 2018	Inizio	**23.1**	19.5	18.1	5.6	8.5	10.1	5.9	6.0	1.7	1.5	3.6
24–30 Aug 2018	SKOP	**24.7**	16.9	19.5	6.0	8.2	10.3	5.8	6.1	1.0	1.6	5.2
27–29 Aug 2018	Sifo	**25.6**	17.7	17.6	5.9	8.9	11.3	5.1	5.4	2.6		7.9
22–29 Aug 2018	SKOP	**25.4**	15.5	20.3	5.5	8.0	9.5	6.2	6.0	0.9	1.5	5.1
23–28 Aug 2018	Sifo	**25.2**	17.6	19.2	5.2	8.9	10.5	5.5	5.7	2.2		6.0
21–28 Aug 2018	Novus	**24.3**	19.4	18.2	5.7	8.0	10.2	6.2	5.3			4.9
21–28 Aug 2018	SKOP	**25.5**	16.2	20.3	5.6	8.3	8.7	6.7	5.8	1.1	1.7	5.2
22–27 Aug 2018	Sifo	**25.9**	18.3	18.8	5.5	8.5	9.5	5.3	6.1	2.1		7.1
22–26 Aug 2018	Inizio	**24.0**	20.3	18.7	5.8	8.7	8.8	5.1	5.7	1.4	1.6	3.7
21–26 Aug 2018	Sifo	**26.2**	17.9	18.5	5.8	9.3	9.1	5.8	5.5	1.9		7.7
16–24 Aug 2018	Ipsos	**26.3**	17.1	19.4	6.0	8.8	9.8	5.4	4.6	2.6		6.9
20-23 Aug 2018	Sifo	**25.4**	17.6	18.6	6.1	10.3	9.5	5.9	4.7	1.9		6.8
16–22 Aug 2018	SKOP	**24.5**	17.1	20.1	5.8	8.2	9.2	6.3	4.6	1.7	2.5	4.4
13–21 Aug 2018	Novus	**25.1**	19.3	19.2	6.2	10.0	8.7	5.3	3.5	2.7		5.8
17–20 Aug 2018	YouGov	21.9	15.8	**24.2**	5.1	7.9	9.2	5.3	3.8	2.1	4.7	2.3
13–16 Aug 2018	Sifo	**25.2**	19.4	18.7	6.5	9.5	9.3	5.1	4.2	1.0	1.1	5.8
10–16 Aug 2018	Inizio	**24.6**	20.9	18.8	5.3	8.5	8.7	4.7	5.2	1.1	2.2	3.7
7-16 Aug 2018	Ipsos	**24.9**	17.7	19.0	6.1	10.1	9.5	5.9	4.0	1.0	1.7	5.9
8–15 Aug 2018	Demoskop	**23.6**	19.7	19.6	6.5	11.1	8.8	4.8	3.6	1.0	1.3	3.9
9–14 Aug 2018	Sentio	**22.5**	19.6	21.8	4.7	7.6	10.6	4.3	3.8	1.7	3.4	0.7
23 Jul–12 Aug 2018	Novus	**24.2**	18.1	21.6	5.2	9.6	9.6	5.9	3.0	1.2	2.6	2.6
6–9 Aug 2018	Sifo	**25.8**	20.3	16.8	5.6	10.3	9.2	6.0	3.3	1.5	1.2	5.5
25 Jul–2 Aug 2018	Inizio	**24.9**	20.4	19.0	4.8	9.5	8.7	4.4	4.8	1.5	1.9	4.5
27 Jul–1 Aug 2018	Sentio	21.1	19.1	**25.5**	3.9	6.9	12.6	4.6	2.4	1.2	2.6	4.4
25 Jun–22 Jul 2018	Novus	**23.7**	19.6	21.6	5.7	8.4	10.1	5.0	3.2	2.7		2.1
20 Jun–21 Jul 2018	SKOP	**25.9**	19.2	20.7	3.5	10.1	10.3	4.9	3.3	0.9	1.2	5.2
13–15 Jul 2018	YouGov	21.2	15.9	**25.7**	3.9	8.6	9.8	5.4	3.8	1.0	4.7	4.5
28 Jun–3 Jul 2018	Sentio	21.2	18.1	**25.6**	3.8	7.1	10.8	5.8	4.0	1.1	2.5	4.4
25 Jun–3 Jul 2018	Demoskop	**25.9**	19.9	21.0	4.2	9.8	9.1	4.3	2.5	1.9	1.4	4.9
20–26 Jun 2018	Inizio	**23.9**	20.6	20.5	3.9	9.5	8.9	5.1	4.5	1.4	1.7	3.3
7–24 Jun 2018	Novus	**24.5**	19.8	22.4	4.7	8.9	9.0	4.8	3.4	2.5		2.1
15–18 Jun 2018	YouGov	22.0	17.3	**28.5**	3.8	7.1	9.3	4.3	3.1	1.4	3.4	6.5
7–18 Jun 2018	Ipsos	**24.1**	19.1	20.5	4.2	9.5	10.1	6.2	2.7	2.1	1.5	3.6
8 May–18 Jun 2018	SKOP	**26.3**	22.9	19.0	4.5	9.0	7.6	4.5	2.5	1.7	2.1	3.4
4–14 Jun 2018	Sifo	**26.1**	20.6	18.5	4.0	10.8	9.8	4.9	2.4	1.5	1.4	5.5
29 May–6 Jun 2018	Demoskop	**23.1**	19.9	21.0	4.9	9.8	8.3	5.1	3.8	2.3	1.8	2.1
14 May–6 Jun 2018	Novus	**23.8**	21.1	21.9	4.5	8.9	9.1	4.6	2.9	—N/a	3.2	1.9
1–5 Jun 2018	Sentio	21.7	17.1	**26.1**	4.8	7.2	9.7	7.0	3.3	0.6	2.5	4.4
21–30 May 2018	Inizio	**24.5**	22.0	19.5	3.9	9.5	8.2	4.3	4.9	1.5	1.8	2.5
27 Apr–29 May 2018	SCB	**28.3**	22.6	18.5	4.3	8.7	7.4	4.4	2.9	—N/a	2.9	5.7
10–21 May 2018	Ipsos	**24**	22	20	4	9	9	5	4	2	2	2
7–17 May 2018	Sifo	**25.2**	23.6	18.7	4.0	8.1	9.3	4.8	3.5	1.6	1.3	1.6
11–14 May 2018	YouGov	**23.0**	18.3	**23.0**	3.6	10.1	9.0	4.2	3.0	1.8	3.9	Tie
16 Apr–13 May 2018	Novus	**26.9**	20.6	19.2	4.3	9.4	8.4	4.4	3.5	—N/a	3.3	6.3
4–7 May 2018	Sentio	**25.3**	20.4	23.1	4.4	7.6	9.2	3.7	2.1	2.2	2.0	2.2
1–7 May 2018	Inizio	**26.6**	22.4	16.9	3.8	9.0	7.4	4.2	4.8	2.5	2.4	4.2
24 Apr–2 May 2018	Demoskop	**26.3**	22.3	19.4	4.4	9.1	7.7	4.9	2.9	1.5	1.5	4.0
12–23 Apr 2018	Ipsos	**26**	21	17	4	12	8	5	3	2	2	5
13–16 Apr 2018	YouGov	**23.3**	19.9	22.1	3.9	8.9	8.5	4.0	3.2	2.6	3.7	1.2
19 Mar–15 Apr 2018	Novus	**26.9**	22.1	18.2	4.0	9.2	8.1	5.0	3.5	—N/a	3.0	4.8
16 Mar–13 Apr 2018	SKOP	**26.7**	25.1	16.7	3.5	9.0	7.0	5.1	4.3	2.3	0.3	1.6
2–12 Apr 2018	Sifo	**28.4**	23.0	14.8	4.1	9.7	8.1	4.4	3.4	2.6	1.7	5.4
5–10 Apr 2018	Sentio	**25.9**	20.1	21.4	4.4	6.4	8.3	4.4	2.4	3.1	3.6	4.5
3–9 Apr 2018	Inizio	**27.3**	23.3	15.9	4.0	9.0	6.5	3.9	5.1	2.3	2.6	4.0
27 Mar–4 Apr 2018	Demoskop	**25.9**	22.2	18.8	5.2	9.5	8.7	4.0	3.3	1.3	1.1	3.7
16–19 Mar 2018	YouGov	**24.0**	18.8	22.4	4.0	7.6	8.3	4.7	3.6	2.5	4.1	1.6
8–19 Mar 2018	Ipsos	**28**	21	17	4	10	9	5	3	2	2	7
19 Feb–18 Mar 2018	Novus	**27.8**	22.6	17.8	3.8	9.3	7.8	5.0	3.2	—N/a	2.7	5.2
5–15 Mar 2018	Sifo	**29.0**	23.1	15.9	3.8	10.0	7.7	4.4	3.0	1.8	1.3	5.9
8–14 Mar 2018	Sentio	**24.6**	19.5	23.0	4.7	6.5	8.1	3.9	4.8	2.0	2.9	1.6
27 Feb–7 Mar 2018	Demoskop	**27.2**	21.8	18.6	4.6	7.9	8.5	5.1	3.3	1.8	1.2	5.4
1–5 Mar 2018	Inizio	**26.4**	24.5	15.7	3.3	8.8	6.9	3.6	5.9	2.6	2.3	1.9
16–19 Feb 2018	YouGov	**22.4**	20.5	22.1	3.4	9.3	10.0	4.7	2.6	2.5	2.4	0.3
8–19 Feb 2018	Ipsos	**29**	21	16	3	11	9	5	3	2	1	8
22 Jan–18 Feb 2018	Novus	**28.4**	23.7	17.1	4.3	8.8	8.1	4.6	2.7	—N/a	2.3	4.7
5–15 Feb 2018	Sifo	**27.3**	23.8	16.2	4.6	10.5	7.2	5.0	2.8	1.4	1.4	3.5
9–14 Feb 2018	Sentio	**24.6**	21.0	21.9	3.3	10.8	9.0	4.4	2.2	1.8	1.0	2.7
30 Jan–6 Feb 2018	Demoskop	**27.3**	23.9	15.4	5.1	9.3	7.2	4.9	3.5	2.1	1.3	3.4
30 Jan–5 Feb 2018	Inizio	**28.5**	24.6	15.6	3.2	9.3	6.8	4.0	4.1	2.1	2.0	3.9
11 Jan–2 Feb 2018	SKOP	**26.9**	25.0	15.5	3.1	10.7	7.7	5.1	3.5	2.0	0.7	1.9
2–22 Jan 2018	Novus	**28.6**	23.8	16.5	4.1	8.9	7.6	5.0	2.7	—N/a	2.8	4.8
10–21 Jan 2018	Ipsos	**28**	25	16	4	9	7	5	3	2	1	3
8–18 Jan 2018	Sifo	**27.8**	24.4	16.2	4.1	8.8	7.7	5.1	2.9	2.1	1.1	3.4
12–16 Jan 2018	Sentio	**27.0**	19.9	22.2	3.8	8.6	7.1	3.6	2.9	2.7	2.2	4.8
12–15 Jan 2018	YouGov	**26.2**	20.9	20.5	4.5	9.1	7.8	3.8	2.5	2.1	2.6	5.3
2–9 Jan 2018	Demoskop	**27.8**	22.6	17.9	4.4	9.2	7.2	4.5	2.9	1.9	1.6	5.2
3–8 Jan 2018	Inizio	**28.3**	23.7	16.0	3.6	9.9	7.4	3.4	4.0	1.3	2.3	4.7
27 Nov–21 Dec 2017	Novus	**29.5**	21.3	16.8	4.3	9.8	7.5	5.4	3.3	—N/a	2.1	8.2
15–18 Dec 2017	YouGov	**25.5**	22.7	20.5	3.9	7.9	7.0	4.9	3.3	2.1	2.2	2.8
6–14 Dec 2017	Ipsos	**28**	23	16	4	10	7	5	3	2	2	5
4–14 Dec 2017	Sifo	**29.3**	22.0	16.5	4.1	10.2	7.4	5.0	2.7	1.9	0.9	7.3
6–12 Dec 2017	Inizio	**27.5**	23.7	15.9	3.1	10.1	6.8	3.9	4.8	1.7	2.6	3.8
1–6 Dec 2017	Sentio	**23.0**	20.2	**23.0**	3.9	10.0	8.0	4.6	3.0	1.6	2.7	Tie
28 Nov–5 Dec 2017	Demoskop	**27.1**	20.9	18.3	3.9	9.1	8.5	5.8	3.0	2.2	1.2	6.2
27 Oct–28 Nov 2017	SCB	**32.6**	22.2	14.8	3.8	9.5	7.0	4.2	3.1	—N/a	2.6	10.4
30 Oct–26 Nov 2017	Novus	**28.6**	19.9	16.6	5.0	11.0	7.3	5.5	3.6	—N/a	2.5	8.7
16–21 Nov 2017	Sentio	**26.6**	18.2	21.7	4.8	9.1	7.7	4.2	3.3	1.9	1.8	4.9
17–20 Nov 2017	YouGov	**25.2**	20.2	20.7	4.6	10.3	7.6	4.5	2.8	1.3	2.6	4.5
9–19 Nov 2017	Ipsos	**28**	21	16	5	11	8	5	3	2	1	7
8–13 Nov 2017	Inizio	**28.6**	23.2	15.4	4.0	10.1	6.8	3.3	4.0	2.0	2.7	5.4
30 Oct–9 Nov 2017	Sifo	**29.8**	22.4	14.7	4.2	10.3	6.9	5.4	3.1	2.1	1.1	7.4
25 Oct–1 Nov 2017	Demoskop	**28.2**	21.9	18.1	4.4	9.1	7.5	4.9	2.8	2.2	0.9	6.3
10–31 Oct 2017	SKOP	**28.3**	22.2	16.0	3.5	11.9	7.4	4.8	3.4	1.7	1.0	6.1
2–29 Oct 2017	Novus	**29.8**	20.6	16.2	4.0	10.8	7.6	4.8	3.8	—N/a	2.4	9.2
20–23 Oct 2017	YouGov	**25.2**	19.9	21.9	3.2	9.0	7.7	5.4	3.0	2.1	2.6	3.3
12–22 Oct 2017	Ipsos	**30**	22	15	4	10	7	6	3	2	1	8
2–12 Oct 2017	Sifo	**30.5**	18.6	15.0	3.8	12.3	8.3	6.1	2.9	1.1	1.4	11.9
5–9 Oct 2017	Sentio	**25.9**	16.8	22.8	4.0	9.6	8.8	5.5	2.3	1.9	2.4	3.1
3–9 Oct 2017	Inizio	**30.1**	18.7	17.9	3.2	11.5	6.6	3.7	4.4	1.7	2.2	11.4
24 Sep–1 Oct 2017	Demoskop	**32.1**	17.2	15.3	4.4	12.6	7.9	4.5	3.7	1.6	0.7	14.9
4 Sep–1 Oct 2017	Novus	**29.4**	16.2	17.5	4.3	12.5	7.9	6.4	3.5	—N/a	2.3	11.9
14–18 Sep 2017	YouGov	**26.3**	16.0	25.3	3.1	9.4	7.5	5.5	3.1	2.0	1.8	1.0
7–18 Sep 2017	Ipsos	**29**	16	18	4	13	7	6	3	3	2	11
4–14 Sep 2017	Sifo	**29.7**	17.2	17.8	4.5	11.9	7.4	5.0	3.7	2.0	0.7	11.9
8–11 Sep 2017	Sentio	**25.3**	17.0	23.4	4.1	11.5	6.9	4.7	3.1	2.8	0.9	1.9
1–6 Sep 2017	Inizio	**28.8**	16.5	19.9	3.5	12.3	6.5	3.6	4.7	1.5	2.7	8.9
29 Aug–5 Sep 2017	Demoskop	**30.3**	17.3	18.1	4.6	11.2	8.0	5.2	2.8	2.0	0.5	12.2
7 Aug–3 Sep 2017	Novus	**29.7**	16.3	18.1	4.8	12.0	6.8	5.4	3.9	2.0	1.0	11.6
10–21 Aug 2017	Ipsos	**29**	17	19	5	11	8	6	3	2	1	10
7–17 Aug 2017	Sifo	**30.0**	16.2	18.3	4.1	12.4	6.4	6.2	3.6	1.9	1.1	11.7
11–15 Aug 2017	YouGov	**25.4**	16.1	23.6	4.3	11.5	8.2	4.6	2.9	2.2	1.3	1.8
11–14 Aug 2017	Sentio	23.5	15.1	**27.4**	4.3	10.5	8.6	4.1	3.2	2.4	0.9	3.9
7–14 Aug 2017	Inizio	**28.7**	16.0	20.1	2.6	12.9	6.8	4.1	4.8	1.6	2.4	8.6
1–8 Aug 2017	Demoskop	**28.4**	17.2	16.6	4.4	12.9	7.4	6.4	4.0	1.6	1.1	11.2
31 Jul–6 Aug 2017	Novus	**29.3**	15.2	18.7	3.9	12.8	7.6	5.5	4.3	1.8	0.9	10.6
Jul 2017	YouGov	**24.9**	17.8	23.0	4.1	10.5	8.0	5.3	2.6	2.4	1.6	1.9
14–19 Jul 2017	Sentio	22.4	12.7	**26.8**	3.8	11.6	9.2	5.7	3.8	1.8	2.2	4.4
7 Jun–6 Jul 2017	SKOP	**27.1**	15.0	20.2	4.4	12.8	7.3	6.4	3.0	3.0	0.7	6.9
26 Jun–4 Jul 2017	Demoskop	**27.0**	15.7	20.1	4.9	11.9	8.0	6.7	2.6	1.8	1.3	6.9
16–29 Jun 2017	Inizio	**27.1**	16.8	21.1	3.1	12.4	7.0	4.7	4.0	1.4	2.3	6.0
5–25 Jun 2017	Novus	**27.3**	15.9	20.0	4.5	12.5	8.4	5.8	3.3	1.3	1.0	7.3
15–20 Jun 2017	YouGov	22.3	17.4	**24.0**	4.2	11.7	8.0	5.3	3.4	2.5	1.4	1.7
7–19 Jun 2017	Ipsos	**29**	16	18	4	12	8	7	3	2	1	11
5–15 Jun 2017	Sifo	**29.2**	15.9	18.0	4.0	13.4	7.7	6.2	2.9	2.1	0.7	11.2
6–13 Jun 2017	Inizio	**27.4**	16.4	20.4	3.1	12.8	6.7	4.2	4.4	2.4	2.2	7.0
30 May–7 Jun 2017	Demoskop	**26.7**	18.2	20.2	4.1	11.0	8.9	4.8	2.6	2.6	0.9	6.5
1–5 Jun 2017	Sentio	24.7	15.9	**25.0**	3.1	11.2	7.9	4.2	3.5	2.5	2.0	0.3
8 May–4 Jun 2017	Novus	**27.3**	16.6	19.3	4.3	13.3	7.6	5.6	3.1	2.0	0.9	8.0
28 Apr–28 May 2017	SCB	**31.1**	18.1	18.4	4.5	11.3	6.3	5.0	3.2	—N/a	2.2	12.7
9–22 May 2017	Ipsos	**26**	15	19	3	13	9	7	4	3	1	7
10–17 May 2017	Inizio	**25.7**	16.8	20.8	3.0	13.6	7.2	4.7	4.2	1.7	2.3	4.9
11–15 May 2017	YouGov	**25.3**	16.0	23.6	2.1	12.8	8.1	5.4	2.9	2.6	1.3	1.7
2–11 May 2017	Sifo	**29.5**	17.5	16.6	3.7	12.6	7.8	5.7	2.7	2.6	1.1	12.0
5–8 May 2017	Sentio	**24.0**	17.9	23.2	4.1	10.6	8.1	4.8	2.5	2.6	2.2	0.8
17 Apr–7 May 2017	Novus	**28.3**	16.4	19.5	4.3	12.2	7.5	5.3	3.9	1.9	0.7	8.8
24 Apr–3 May 2017	Demoskop	**27.8**	18.0	17.3	4.6	12.8	6.6	5.5	3.7	3.3	0.5	9.8
24 Apr–1 May 2017	Inizio	**26.5**	16.8	20.7	2.9	13.3	6.9	5.0	4.7	1.0	2.2	5.8
18–27 Apr 2017	Sifo	**29.2**	18.1	16.5	5.0	13.0	7.8	5.5	2.6	—N/a	2.3	11.1
3–19 Apr 2017	Ipsos	**29**	17	18	3	12	8	6	4	2	2	11
12–18 Apr 2017	YouGov	24.1	15.6	**25.6**	2.7	12.8	6.3	5.5	3.6	2.5	1.3	1.5
10–17 Apr 2017	Inizio	**28.3**	16.8	21.2	2.5	12.5	6.7	4.4	4.6	0.9	2.1	7.1
20 Mar–16 Apr 2017	Novus	**28.2**	16.4	19.0	4.2	12.6	7.4	5.2	3.4	2.5	1.1	9.2
3–12 Apr 2017	Sifo	**29.9**	17.5	16.7	3.2	13.8	8.2	5.4	2.9	1.8	0.6	12.4
7–10 Apr 2017	Sentio	23.3	15.8	**27.2**	4.8	8.7	7.2	4.8	3.7	2.2	2.3	3.9
28 Mar–5 Apr 2017	Demoskop	**26.2**	17.8	17.8	5.7	13.5	7.4	6.0	2.8	1.8	1.0	8.4
17–20 Mar 2017	YouGov	22.0	15.4	**23.9**	3.5	12.5	8.7	6.5	3.0	3.4	1.1	1.9
9–19 Mar 2017	Ipsos	**27**	17	18	5	13	8	7	3	2	1	9
20 Feb–19 Mar 2017	Novus	**26.7**	18.0	19.2	4.6	12.2	7.1	5.9	3.2	2.0	1.1	7.5
6–16 Mar 2017	Sifo	**28.7**	18.4	16.7	4.5	14.2	7.1	5.7	2.8	1.3	0.6	10.3
8–14 Mar 2017	Inizio	**25.7**	17.6	22.2	3.1	12.1	7.1	4.7	4.0	1.6	1.9	3.5
9–13 Mar 2017	Sentio	24.1	15.2	**26.0**	3.4	11.0	8.9	3.9	2.4	3.0	2.1	1.9
28 Feb–7 Mar 2017	Demoskop	**27.8**	16.6	18.2	5.7	12.1	7.9	5.1	3.0	2.0	1.6	9.6
17–20 Feb 2017	YouGov	23.5	17.0	**23.9**	3.9	11.8	8.1	4.2	3.6	2.5	1.4	0.4
16–20 Feb 2017	Sentio	23.2	16.7	**26.9**	3.6	10.7	8.2	4.6	3.0	1.7	1.4	3.7
8–20 Feb 2017	Ipsos	**27**	20	17	4	12	7	6	3	2	2	7
23 Jan–19 Feb 2017	Novus	**27.1**	19.1	18.5	4.5	11.5	7.8	5.3	3.1	2.3	0.8	8.0
6–16 Feb 2017	Sifo	**27.5**	20.4	16.8	4.9	11.8	6.9	5.6	3.6	1.9	0.8	7.1
5–14 Feb 2017	Inizio	**25.0**	19.8	21.5	3.7	10.9	7.3	5.4	4.2	1.2	1.1	3.6
31 Jan–8 Feb 2017	Demoskop	**26.9**	18.5	17.5	4.7	11.1	9.0	5.8	3.6	2.1	0.8	8.4
23 Jan–7 Feb 2017	Sifo	**27.3**	19.8	16.5	4.6	11.6	7.4	5.9	3.9	2.2	0.9	7.5
12–22 Jan 2017	Ipsos	**25**	23	16	4	9	8	7	3	2	2	2
2–22 Jan 2017	Novus	**26.9**	22.4	17.7	4.4	9.3	7.7	5.4	3.3	2.0	0.9	4.5
9–19 Jan 2017	Sifo	**29.7**	21.9	16.0	4.3	9.3	8.0	5.3	2.6	2.1	0.8	7.8
12–18 Jan 2017	Sentio	21.8	18.4	**22.3**	5.4	8.9	9.1	5.5	3.9	3.0	1.7	0.5
9–17 Jan 2017	Inizio	**25.8**	21.3	21.5	4.3	9.7	6.9	4.7	3.7	1.0	1.0	4.3
12–16 Jan 2017	YouGov	21.5	21.4	**24.7**	3.9	8.9	8.1	4.5	2.8	2.6	1.6	3.2
3–10 Jan 2017	Demoskop	**26.7**	24.3	16.2	4.7	9.4	8.1	4.7	2.6	2.1	1.2	2.4
16–20 Dec 2016	YouGov	**24.3**	19.0	24.2	3.2	8.4	7.2	4.9	4.2	3.3	1.1	0.1
21 Nov–18 Dec 2016	Novus	**27.3**	21.8	17.9	4.9	9.3	7.4	5.4	3.0	2.0	1.0	5.5
5–15 Dec 2016	Sifo	**27.6**	22.2	15.2	5.2	9.1	8.4	6.0	3.6	1.6	1.1	5.4
8–14 Dec 2016	Sentio	**23.8**	18.4	22.6	3.6	8.1	9.2	6.4	3.7	2.0	2.2	1.2
5–14 Dec 2016	Inizio	**26.2**	21.6	20.6	3.5	8.8	7.7	5.3	4.0	1.3	0.9	4.6
1–12 Dec 2016	Ipsos	**26**	22	17	5	9	7	7	3	2	2	4
29 Nov–6 Dec 2016	Demoskop	**25.8**	22.3	18.5	5.2	9.2	7.5	4.8	3.2	2.5	1.0	3.5
28 Oct–27 Nov 2016	SCB	**29.2**	22.8	17.5	4.5	7.1	7.7	5.0	3.1	—N/a	3.2	6.4
17–22 Nov 2016	Sentio	20.8	20.5	**25.0**	3.0	8.1	9.1	4.8	3.4	3.4	1.9	4.2
10–21 Nov 2016	Ipsos	**27**	23	17	4	8	7	6	3	3	2	4
24 Oct–20 Nov 2016	Novus	**26.6**	23.1	17.8	5.1	8.0	7.5	5.6	3.0	2.4	0.9	3.5
7–17 Nov 2016	Sifo	**27.5**	23.1	15.8	4.4	8.7	7.5	6.5	3.5	2.1	0.8	4.4
7–15 Nov 2016	Inizio	**25.6**	22.0	21.5	4.2	8.6	8.0	4.1	3.5	1.8	0.7	3.6
11–14 Nov 2016	YouGov	21.8	22.3	**24.8**	3.3	7.7	8.0	5.9	2.3	2.5	1.4	2.5
25 Oct–2 Nov 2016	Demoskop	**27.8**	23.6	17.6	4.6	7.8	8.4	4.8	2.5	2.0	0.9	4.2
20–26 Oct 2016	Sentio	**23.5**	19.5	21.7	2.4	8.7	9.7	5.9	4.1	2.4	2.1	1.8
13–24 Oct 2016	Ipsos	**25**	24	19	5	7	8	7	2	2	2	1
26 Sep–23 Oct 2016	Novus	**26.2**	22.9	18.7	4.5	8.3	7.5	5.7	2.9	2.2	1.1	3.3
13–19 Oct 2016	Inizio	**24.5**	23.4	20.0	4.2	8.1	7.5	4.9	3.9	2.0	1.6	1.1
14–18 Oct 2016	YouGov	22.2	22.4	**24.3**	3.2	6.4	7.7	5.1	4.9	2.5	1.3	1.9
3–13 Oct 2016	Sifo	**25.9**	25.0	16.8	4.7	8.3	8.2	5.4	2.8	2.1	0.9	0.9
27 Sep–5 Oct 2016	Demoskop	**28.7**	22.7	16.9	4.1	8.1	6.4	5.0	3.7	2.6	1.8	6.0
29 Aug–25 Sep 2016	Novus	**26.8**	24.6	17.7	4.9	7.5	7.6	4.7	3.3	2.1	0.8	2.2
12–22 Sep 2016	Inizio	**25.2**	24.2	18.9	3.7	8.6	8.2	4.3	3.9	1.9	1.2	1.0
16–19 Sep 2016	YouGov	23.2	23.0	**25.2**	3.9	6.2	7.1	4.9	2.9	2.6	1.1	2.0
9–19 Sep 2016	Ipsos	**26**	24	19	4	7	7	6	4	2	1	2
5–15 Sep 2016	Sifo	**28.0**	24.8	15.6	4.2	8.4	7.6	5.2	3.0	2.1	1.1	3.2
8–13 Sep 2016	Sentio	21.5	21.0	**24.5**	4.8	6.8	8.6	4.9	2.8	2.8	2.3	3.0
30 Aug–7 Sep 2016	Demoskop	**27.0**	23.9	17.9	4.8	7.1	8.6	4.3	3.0	2.2	1.2	3.1
1–28 Aug 2016	Novus	**26.4**	25.3	17.2	4.4	7.6	7.7	5.1	3.2	2.1	1.0	1.1
14–22 Aug 2016	Ipsos	**26**	25	18	4	8	7	5	3	3	1	1
16–21 Aug 2016	Sentio	22.8	21.6	**23.5**	3.5	6.2	10.9	4.2	3.5	2.6	1.2	0.7
8–18 Aug 2016	Sifo	**27.1**	26.3	15.6	4.4	8.0	6.8	4.8	4.0	2.3	0.8	0.8
10–18 Aug 2016	Inizio	**26.1**	24.6	17.9	3.2	8.3	9.4	4.5	3.8	1.7	0.5	1.5
12–16 Aug 2016	YouGov	22.9	23.6	**24.8**	2.8	6.5	8.0	4.0	3.1	3.3	1.2	1.2
Jul 2016	YouGov	22.6	23.8	**25.0**	3.0	7.5	7.9	3.3	3.7	1.9	1.4	1.2
28 Jun–5 Jul 2016	Demoskop	**26.0**	24.7	16.8	4.8	7.9	7.6	5.7	3.3	2.2	1.0	1.3
30 May–26 Jun 2016	Novus	**26.2**	26.0	18.2	4.3	6.7	7.5	5.0	2.8	2.4	0.9	0.2
17–21 Jun 2016	YouGov	22.7	**24.4**	23.3	3.2	7.4	7.4	3.3	4.0	3.1	1.3	1.1
7–16 June 2016	Ipsos	**26**	24	17	4	7	8	6	3	2	1	2
7–16 Jun 2016	Sifo	26.4	**27.4**	15.8	4.4	6.3	7.1	5.8	3.2	2.7	0.8	1.0
6–15 Jun 2016	Inizio	**25.4**	23.7	19.5	3.6	7.9	8.0	4.2	4.8	1.5	1.4	1.7
31 May–8 Jun 2016	Demoskop	**26.4**	24.7	17.4	5.3	6.9	6.9	5.1	3.5	2.3	1.5	1.7
2–6 Jun 2016	Sentio	22.9	21.0	**24.5**	5.3	8.0	6.9	3.9	2.8	2.9	1.8	1.6
28 Apr–26 May 2016	SCB	**29.5**	24.7	17.3	4.7	6.1	6.8	5.4	3.1	—N/a	2.4	4.8
9–29 May 2016	Novus	23.8	**27.9**	17.8	4.5	6.4	7.7	5.6	3.2	2.2	0.9	4.1
16–25 May 2016	Ipsos	**27.8**	24.5	17.1	3.5	6.1	7.4	7.1	3.2	1.8	1.5	3.3
19–23 May 2016	YouGov	22.6	22.1	**22.9**	2.8	7.9	7.5	5.3	4.6	2.8	1.6	0.3
12–18 May 2016	Sentio	**24.8**	22.1	23.7	4.5	5.0	7.8	4.5	3.7	1.8	2.1	1.1
9–19 May 2016	Inizio	**24.3**	23.9	18.8	4.4	7.5	9.6	4.7	5.0	1.4	0.5	0.4
2–12 May 2016	Sifo	**26.5**	25.7	16.1	4.1	6.3	7.9	6.2	4.0	2.1	1.1	0.8
18 Apr–8 May 2016	Novus	**25.9**	25.7	17.7	4.5	6.0	7.3	6.5	3.3	2.5	0.5	0.2
26 Apr–3 May 2016	Demoskop	24.9	**25.5**	16.4	5.1	7.4	8.0	5.6	3.3	2.3	1.5	0.6
25 Apr–3 May 2016	Sifo	26.5	**27.4**	15.3	4.3	5.9	8.2	5.4	4.3	1.6	1.1	0.9
15–19 Apr 2016	YouGov	23.5	**23.6**	**23.6**	5.4	6.7	7.8	3.6	2.7	2.1	1.0	Tie
14–25 Apr 2016	Ipsos	24.4	**28.1**	16.6	4.8	6.1	7.1	6.3	3.3	2.8	0.5	3.7
7–17 Apr 2016	Inizio	**25.4**	24.2	19.7	4.6	7.3	8.1	4.3	3.9	1.4	1.3	1.2
21 Mar–17 Apr 2016	Novus	**26.0**	24.0	18.9	5.6	6.8	7.1	5.8	3.1	1.9	0.8	2.0
6–13 Apr 2016	Sentio	**24.1**	21.1	22.3	4.6	5.6	8.1	6.0	3.0	2.6	2.6	1.8
4–14 Apr 2016	Sifo	**26.7**	25.8	15.7	6.0	7.3	7.2	5.5	3.5	1.7	0.7	0.9
29 Mar–6 Apr 2016	Demoskop	25.5	**28.0**	15.5	5.3	6.3	7.7	5.3	3.5	2.2	0.8	2.5
22 Feb–20 Mar 2016	Novus	**24.9**	24.2	19.9	6.2	6.2	7.6	5.3	3.4	1.5	0.8	0.7
10–20 Mar 2016	Ipsos	**28.9**	25.9	14.7	5.0	6.1	7.3	5.4	3.6	1.9	1.1	3.0
15–22 Mar 2016	Inizio	**27.2**	23.9	18.9	4.8	6.7	7.1	4.0	4.2	2.4	0.9	3.3
11–14 Mar 2016	YouGov	21.9	24.6	**24.9**	5.0	5.7	7.2	3.7	3.6	2.2	1.2	0.3
16 Feb–10 Mar 2016	SKOP	**26.7**	25.1	16.3	7.0	5.9	7.0	5.1	4.5	1.9	0.5	1.6
3–9 Mar 2016	Sentio	22.1	22.7	**24.0**	6.1	5.3	7.9	4.2	3.3	3.3	2.0	1.3
29 Feb–10 Mar 2016	Sifo	26.2	**26.9**	17.0	6.1	6.1	7.4	5.0	3.6	1.1	0.8	0.7
23 Feb–2 Mar 2016	Demoskop	**26.3**	24.5	17.7	5.7	6.0	7.2	6.4	3.1	2.0	1.1	1.8
11–21 Feb 2016	Ipsos	25.1	**25.6**	16.2	5.3	6.2	7.7	7.4	3.4	2.2	1.0	0.5
25 Jan–21 Feb 2016	Novus	24.1	**25.0**	19.3	5.6	6.6	7.2	5.8	3.5	2.0	0.9	0.9
7–17 Feb 2016	Inizio	**24.5**	22.4	20.9	4.5	8.7	6.6	4.5	4.5	2.5	0.9	2.1
12–15 Feb 2016	YouGov	21.6	21.3	**25.3**	4.8	5.6	8.1	5.6	3.6	3.2	0.9	3.7
1–11 Feb 2016	Sifo	25.2	**25.4**	16.6	6.5	7.1	7.5	6.0	3.5	1.8	0.4	0.2
3–9 Feb 2016	Sentio	21.1	21.8	**25.5**	5.3	6.6	6.3	4.7	3.0	3.2	2.5	3.7
26 Jan–2 Feb 2016	Demoskop	23.0	**27.2**	18.8	5.5	6.6	7.1	5.8	3.0	1.9	1.0	4.2
14–25 Jan 2016	Ipsos	24.7	**25.8**	16.7	6.5	7.2	6.6	6.6	2.7	1.9	1.3	1.1
4–24 Jan 2016	Novus	**24.4**	23.9	20.3	5.7	6.4	6.6	6.1	3.6	2.1	0.9	0.5
11–21 Jan 2016	Sifo	23.2	**25.6**	18.2	5.9	6.8	8.1	6.0	4.4	1.6	0.4	2.4
15–18 Jan 2016	YouGov	21.6	21.4	**28.8**	4.2	6.8	7.5	4.0	3.1	2.0	0.6	7.2
12–19 Jan 2016	Inizio	**23.2**	21.3	22.2	4.6	8.8	8.0	5.1	4.4	1.6	0.8	1.0
7–13 Jan 2016	Sentio	23.0	20.1	**25.5**	5.3	7.9	6.9	3.9	2.8	2.9	1.7	2.5
5–12 Jan 2016	Demoskop	**27.3**	23.8	18.7	5.7	7.4	5.4	6.3	2.9	1.8	0.8	3.5
7–28 Dec 2015	SKOP	**25.3**	23.8	16.3	6.7	8.6	7.6	5.8	3.3	2.3	0.4	1.5
7–17 Dec 2015	Sifo	**26.0**	22.1	19.0	6.1	6.4	7.8	6.6	3.5	1.6	0.9	3.9
10–16 Dec 2015	Sentio	23.5	17.8	**26.6**	5.6	7.3	6.9	5.3	3.0	1.7	2.4	3.1
9–16 Dec 2015	Inizio	**23.1**	22.7	22.2	5.7	8.8	6.3	4.9	3.7	1.6	1.0	0.4
10–14 Dec 2015	YouGov	22.3	21.0	**26.9**	4.5	6.8	7.3	4.9	2.8	2.4	1.3	4.6
3–14 Dec 2015	Ipsos	**24.7**	24.1	18.9	5.3	6.8	7.3	6.6	3.8	1.9	0.6	0.6
23 Nov–13 Dec 2015	Novus	**24.7**	21.4	22.0	5.8	7.0	6.8	5.8	3.5	2.3	0.7	2.7
24 Nov–2 Dec 2015	Demoskop	**26.3**	21.9	18.5	6.4	7.0	7.0	6.4	3.6	1.8	1.1	4.4
2–25 Nov 2015	SCB	**27.6**	23.5	19.9	5.9	6.5	5.5	5.5	3.5	—N/a	2.1	4.1
13–23 Nov 2015	Ipsos	**27.5**	23.2	17.2	6.8	6.3	7.2	6.6	3.3	1.6	0.3	4.3
26 Oct–22 Nov 2015	Novus	**24.4**	22.6	20.7	6.4	7.0	7.1	5.2	3.8	1.9	0.9	1.8
9–19 Nov 2015	Sifo	**26.8**	24.6	17.6	5.8	6.8	6.6	5.8	3.9	1.6	0.6	2.2
13–16 Nov 2015	YouGov	21.4	20.6	**26.7**	5.5	7.5	6.7	5.1	3.6	2.3	0.7	5.3
9–16 Nov 2015	Inizio	**25.8**	21.5	20.7	5.5	8.3	5.7	4.8	5.6	1.4	0.7	4.3
5–10 Nov 2015	Sentio	22.0	19.3	**26.8**	5.5	7.4	6.5	5.2	2.9	2.5	2.0	4.8
27 Oct–4 Nov 2015	Demoskop	**26.7**	22.1	18.9	7.2	6.9	5.8	5.4	3.5	2.2	1.3	4.6
28 Sep–25 Oct 2015	Novus	**26.0**	22.4	19.4	6.6	6.9	6.6	4.8	3.9	2.1	1.3	3.6
15–26 Oct 2015	Ipsos	**27.7**	22.0	17.6	6.6	7.1	6.6	6.3	3.3	1.9	1.0	5.7
4–21 Oct 2015	SKOP	**27.1**	23.8	15.7	7.8	8.6	5.2	5.9	3.7	2.0	0.2	3.3
12–20 Oct 2015	Inizio	**26.2**	20.8	20.5	5.3	8.4	5.7	4.2	6.6	1.4	0.9	5.4
5–15 Oct 2015	Sifo	**24.6**	23.8	17.2	7.1	8.0	7.3	5.6	3.7	2.2	0.5	0.8
8–12 Oct 2015	YouGov	23.2	21.8	**24.8**	4.9	6.2	7.0	4.5	3.9	2.5	1.2	1.6
1–8 Oct 2015	Sentio	23.1	20.8	**25.0**	5.1	6.7	7.9	4.6	1.9	3.4	1.5	1.9
29 Sep–6 Oct 2015	Demoskop	**25.2**	22.3	19.5	6.7	7.6	7.0	4.7	3.5	2.6	0.9	2.9
16–24 Sep 2015	Inizio	**25.6**	22.0	21.2	5.2	8.4	7.0	4.1	3.5	1.9	1.1	3.6
9–20 Sep 2015	Ipsos	**27.3**	22.5	16.7	7.3	7.1	6.6	6.6	3.0	1.9	0.9	4.8
7–17 Sep 2015	Sifo	**27.0**	22.8	17.7	7.2	6.7	7.3	5.0	3.7	2.4	0.4	4.2
10–14 Sep 2015	YouGov	21.8	20.0	**27.3**	5.0	7.5	6.5	3.7	4.9	2.5	0.7	5.5
24 Aug–13 Sep 2015	Novus	**26.5**	23.1	20.8	5.9	6.0	6.7	4.9	3.2	2.1	0.8	3.4
3–9 Sep 2015	Sentio	24.1	19.8	**26.5**	6.7	6.6	4.9	4.1	2.6	2.7	2.0	2.4
2–9 Sep 2015	Inizio	**24.9**	21.1	21.5	4.8	9.6	6.2	5.1	4.2	1.7	0.8	3.4
25 Aug–2 Sep 2015	Demoskop	**25.2**	23.1	19.5	6.4	7.2	6.5	5.3	3.5	2.3	1.1	2.1
14–24 Aug 2015	Ipsos	**26.8**	23.8	17.8	6.8	6.2	6.6	5.4	3.5	2.0	1.1	3.0
3–23 Aug 2015	Novus	**25.1**	23.3	19.4	6.7	6.7	7.3	5.2	3.3	2.1	0.9	1.8
10–20 Aug 2015	Sifo	**26.3**	24.5	17.8	7.6	6.1	6.5	4.7	4.0	1.7	0.9	1.8
13–19 Aug 2015	Sentio	**23.5**	21.1	23.4	6.4	7.8	7.5	4.6	2.0	2.3	1.4	0.1
11–19 Aug 2015	Inizio	**25.5**	21.4	20.8	5.7	8.6	6.5	4.2	4.5	1.9	0.9	4.1
14–17 Aug 2015	YouGov	23.4	21.0	**25.2**	6.4	5.6	6.8	4.4	3.7	2.8	0.8	1.8
16–22 Jul 2015	Sentio	**24.1**	20.8	23.3	6.4	6.7	6.4	4.4	3.1	2.4	2.4	0.8
10–13 Jul 2015	YouGov	**23.2**	23.1	22.1	6.7	6.8	5.7	4.9	4.2	2.6	0.8	0.1
30 Jun–7 Jul 2015	Demoskop	**25.5**	23.1	18.7	7.1	6.6	6.8	4.7	4.2	2.4	0.9	2.4
8–25 Jun 2015	SKOP	**29.7**	25.4	14.0	7.5	7.4	5.7	4.6	3.6	1.6	0.6	4.3
20–24 Jun 2015	Inizio	**27.3**	24.3	17.9	5.7	8.0	6.7	4.0	3.1	2.1	0.8	3.0
11–17 Jun 2015	Sentio	**23.9**	23.8	22.1	6.8	6.3	6.9	3.7	2.1	3.1	1.3	0.1
12–15 Jun 2015	YouGov	**24.7**	23.6	20.1	5.9	6.6	6.9	5.2	3.4	2.3	1.3	1.1
5–15 Jun 2015	Ipsos	**27.1**	26.6	15.9	6.5	5.4	6.4	5.8	2.7	2.3	1.2	0.5
18 May–14 Jun 2015	Novus	**26.4**	25.0	18.0	6.0	6.4	6.5	4.9	4.0	1.8	1.0	1.4
1–11 Jun 2015	Sifo	**27.1**	25.0	15.2	6.6	7.9	6.2	4.6	4.1	2.4	1.0	2.1
27 May–3 Jun 2015	Demoskop	25.9	**26.1**	15.7	6.8	7.3	6.8	4.7	3.7	1.9	1.1	0.2
1–30 May 2015	SCB	**30.0**	25.6	14.4	6.6	6.4	6.2	4.9	3.7	—N/a	2.3	4.4
21–27 May 2015	Sentio	**24.3**	**24.3**	19.4	5.5	8.5	6.5	4.2	2.2	—N/a	—N/a	Tie
12–25 May 2015	Ipsos	**27.7**	26.1	14.0	6.7	6.8	6.8	5.4	3.5	1.9	1.1	1.6
10–25 May 2015	Inizio	**26.9**	23.3	17.2	5.6	8.5	6.7	4.6	4.0	1.9	1.3	3.6
13–18 May 2015	YouGov	**26.1**	22.9	19.7	5.4	6.6	6.7	4.9	3.5	2.9	1.3	3.2
20 Apr–17 May 2015	Novus	**25.8**	25.7	16.8	7.2	6.7	6.8	4.5	3.5	1.8	1.2	0.1
4–12 May 2015	Sifo	**25.9**	24.4	14.7	8.2	7.2	7.5	5.7	3.2	2.3	0.9	1.5
28 Apr–6 May 2015	Demoskop	**27.7**	25.8	15.0	6.4	6.2	6.3	5.3	4.2	2.2	0.8	1.9
22–30 Apr 2015	Inizio	**27.3**	24.1	16.4	6.4	7.6	5.5	4.9	4.3	2.2	1.2	3.2
16–27 Apr 2015	Ipsos	**27.7**	25.8	14.6	6.8	4.9	6.5	6.0	4.1	2.1	1.4	1.9
17–20 Apr 2015	YouGov	**26.2**	23.5	19.5	5.6	6.3	6.6	4.9	3.7	2.7	1.0	2.7
23 Mar–19 Apr 2015	Novus	**27.1**	25.2	15.8	6.8	5.9	7.1	5.2	3.7	2.2	1.0	1.9
7–16 Apr 2015	Sifo	**27.4**	24.7	12.5	8.9	6.5	6.6	5.6	3.9	2.6	1.3	2.7
7–15 Apr 2015	Inizio	**28.8**	24.4	16.3	6.1	7.3	6.7	3.5	4.5	1.4	1.2	4.4
9–14 Apr 2015	Sentio	**25.6**	25.5	17.8	5.6	5.6	7.4	4.1	3.5	2.9	2.0	0.1
31 Mar–8 Apr 2015	Demoskop	**28.3**	25.0	15.7	6.9	6.5	6.1	5.3	3.8	1.9	0.6	3.3
23 Feb–22 Mar 2015	Novus	**31.0**	24.2	15.2	6.5	5.6	5.3	4.9	4.2	2.0	1.1	6.8
9–17 Mar 2015	Ipsos	**30.7**	24.8	12.8	7.2	4.7	6.7	5.8	3.8	2.3	1.2	5.9
13–16 Mar 2015	YouGov	**29.1**	21.1	18.5	5.8	6.3	5.6	5.2	4.6	2.7	1.1	8.0
5–12 Mar 2015	Inizio	**28.8**	24.7	16.0	5.7	6.1	6.4	3.8	5.2	2.0	1.3	4.7
2–12 Mar 2015	Sifo	**29.8**	23.9	13.9	6.6	6.6	6.5	5.1	4.0	2.5	1.0	5.9
5–11 Mar 2015	Sentio	**28.2**	22.2	16.6	6.6	6.8	7.7	4.7	3.8	2.3	1.1	6.0
19 Feb–11 Mar 2015	SKOP	**30.6**	24.4	12.9	7.1	6.4	6.3	6.1	3.6	2.2	0.5	6.2
24 Feb–4 Mar 2015	Demoskop	**31.3**	24.1	14.2	6.2	6.5	5.8	4.5	3.7	2.1	1.6	7.2
26 Jan–22 Feb 2015	Novus	**30.9**	23.4	15.0	6.1	5.9	7.0	4.0	4.6	2.2	0.9	7.5
12–18 Feb 2015	Sentio	**28.5**	23.1	16.6	7.2	5.9	5.9	4.8	3.7	2.2	2.1	5.4
2–12 Feb 2015	Sifo	**28.9**	22.1	13.0	7.9	7.0	7.2	5.2	4.7	2.7	1.3	6.8
2–11 Feb 2015	Inizio	**30.3**	24.3	14.8	5.8	7.2	5.6	3.9	5.3	1.5	1.5	6.0
5–9 Feb 2015	YouGov	**30.1**	21.8	19.0	6.3	6.7	5.8	4.4	3.5	2.0	0.4	8.3
27 Jan–4 Feb 2015	Demoskop	**30.6**	24.3	14.0	6.9	5.8	6.5	4.5	4.7	2.2	0.7	6.3
12–26 Jan 2015	Ipsos	**34.3**	23.2	13.1	6.3	5.0	5.8	6.2	3.8	1.5	0.8	11.2
12–22 Jan 2015	Sifo	**29.7**	24.0	13.3	7.4	5.8	6.9	5.1	3.7	3.1	1.1	5.7
22 Dec–18 Jan 2015	Novus	**30.0**	24.1	16.5	6.4	6.0	5.3	4.1	4.5	2.2	0.9	5.9
7–16 Jan 2015	Inizio	**33.0**	24.8	13.6	5.5	6.1	5.4	3.5	4.9	1.9	1.5	8.2
8–13 Jan 2015	Sentio	**29.7**	23.7	15.8	5.6	5.4	7.0	4.8	3.9	—N/a	4.1	6.0
7–8 Jan 2015	Sifo	**33.3**	23.1	13.4	6.7	6.7	5.6	5.0	3.4	1.7	1.1	10.2
30 Dec–7 Jan 2015	Demoskop	**32.3**	24.4	14.4	6.6	5.3	5.3	4.8	4.1	2.1	0.7	7.9
19–27 Dec 2014	YouGov	**30.6**	23.2	16.9	5.7	5.7	6.0	3.7	5.5	2.0	0.7	7.4
8–18 Dec 2014	Sifo	**31.0**	24.5	12.9	7.4	6.1	5.9	5.7	3.7	2.4	0.4	6.5
11–17 Dec 2014	Inizio	**30.5**	27.9	13.2	6.1	6.6	4.1	4.2	4.2	1.9	1.3	2.6
8–15 Dec 2014	Ipsos	**32.0**	26.3	12.5	6.7	5.1	5.4	5.6	3.9	1.5	1.0	5.7
3–14 Dec 2014	Novus	**32.0**	23.7	16.0	6.0	6.6	5.3	4.3	3.9	1.1	1.1	8.3
4–10 Dec 2014	Sentio	**29.7**	24.5	17.5	7.2	5.5	5.1	3.7	3.9	—N/a	2.9	5.2
4–10 Dec 2014	Inizio	**31.0**	26.9	14.0	5.8	7.4	4.2	4.8	4.3	1.3	0.3	4.1
4–5 Dec 2014	YouGov	**29.6**	23.1	17.7	6.9	6.1	4.7	5.0	4.2	2.5	0.7	6.5
25 Nov–3 Dec 2014	Demoskop	**27.3**	26.1	13.5	7.9	6.1	6.4	5.5	4.0	2.3	0.8	1.2
17 Nov–2 Dec 2014	Inizio	**29.8**	24.5	12.0	7.5	6.3	6.2	6.1	3.7	2.9	0.7	5.3
25–30 Nov 2014	Sentio	**27.4**	23.9	16.4	7.5	6.2	7.4	6.2	2.3	—N/a	2.7	3.5
29 Oct–25 Nov 2014	SCB	**32.2**	24.2	12.4	7.2	6.0	5.7	5.3	3.7	—N/a	3.2	8.0
13–24 Nov 2014	Ipsos	**28.5**	26.5	12.5	7.4	6.2	6.2	6.4	2.8	2.4	1.0	2.0
4–24 Nov 2014	SKOP	**30.7**	25.3	11.8	6.7	6.8	6.4	5.3	4.2	1.9	0.8	5.4
10–20 Nov 2014	Sifo	**28.4**	25.6	12.1	8.4	6.1	5.9	5.5	3.9	2.8	1.3	2.8
13 Oct–9 Nov 2014	Novus	**28.6**	25.8	12.3	7.9	7.1	6.3	5.2	4.0	2.2	0.6	2.8
28 Oct–5 Nov 2014	Demoskop	**28.3**	25.1	13.8	7.0	6.2	7.1	4.8	4.2	2.6	1.0	3.2
15–30 Oct 2014	Inizio	**30.6**	24.0	12.9	7.3	5.9	5.9	5.6	4.2	2.8	0.9	6.6
9–21 Oct 2014	Ipsos	**30.7**	24.1	12.5	7.9	5.8	6.2	5.5	3.9	2.5	1.0	6.6
6–16 Oct 2014	Sifo	**26.6**	24.7	12.4	10.0	6.1	7.1	4.9	4.5	3.0	0.9	1.9
15 Sep–12 Oct 2014	Novus	**30.3**	24.6	13.2	7.1	5.7	5.7	5.8	4.1	2.9	0.6	5.7
2–8 Oct 2014	Sentio	**27.3**	25.1	16.7	6.9	5.1	5.2	5.1	2.8	2.9	2.9	2.2
30 Sep–7 Oct 2014	Demoskop	**30.3**	24.1	13.3	8.1	5.8	6.0	5.5	3.9	2.1	0.8	6.2
17–24 Sep 2014	Ipsos	**30.7**	24.0	12.4	7.1	6.1	6.2	5.6	4.2	2.9	0.8	6.7
17–21 Sep 2014	Demoskop	**31.0**	24.6	12.1	6.9	6.8	5.5	5.5	4.0	2.8	0.9	6.4
14 Sep 2014	General election	**31.0**	23.3	12.9	6.9	6.1	5.7	5.4	4.6	3.1	1.0	7.7

=== Coalitions ===
The figures under "Above threshold" disregard votes for parties that would not get enough votes (4%) to be represented in parliament.

Fieldwork date	Polling firm	Overall			Above threshold		
Fieldwork date	Polling firm	S+MP+V	M+C+L+KD	Lead	S+MP+V	M+C+L+KD	Lead
9 Sep 2018	General election	**40.6**	40.3	0.3	**40.6**	40.3	0.3
9 Sep 2018	SVT	39.4	**39.6**	0.3	39.4	**39.6**	0.3
9 Sep 2018	Sifo	**41.0**	40.1	0.9	**41.0**	40.1	0.9
Exit polls
3–7 Sep 2018	Inizio	39.4	**40.7**	1.3	39.4	**40.7**	1.3
2–7 Sep 2018	SKOP	**41.1**	38.4	2.7	**41.1**	38.4	2.7
6 Sep 2018	Novus	**39.9**	38.5	1.4	**39.9**	38.5	1.4
5–6 Sep 2018	Sifo	**40.6**	39.2	1.4	**40.6**	39.2	1.4
1 Sep-6 Sep 2018	Demoskop	**41.6**	38.4	3.2	**41.6**	38.4	3.2
30 Aug–6 Sep 2018	SKOP	**39.4**	38.3	1.1	**39.4**	38.3	1.1
3–5 Sep 2018	Sifo	**41.4**	39.1	2.3	**41.4**	39.1	2.3
29 Aug–5 Sep 2018	SKOP	38.3	**38.4**	0.1	38.3	**38.4**	0.1
30 Aug–4 Sep 2018	Sifo	**40.6**	39.9	0.7	**40.6**	39.9	0.7
30 Aug-4 Sep 2018	Demoskop	**39.7**	38.8	0.9	**39.7**	38.8	0.9
29 Aug–3 Sep 2018	Sifo	**41.8**	38.1	3.7	**41.8**	38.1	3.7
3 Sep 2018	Ipsos	**42.2**	38.7	3.5	**42.2**	38.7	3.5
29 Aug–3 Sep 2018	Inizio	**39.0**	38.1	0.9	**39.0**	38.1	0.9
28 Aug–2 Sep 2018	Sifo	**41.2**	37.4	3.8	**41.2**	37.4	3.8
25-31 Aug 2018	SKOP	**40.5**	36.6	3.9	**40.5**	36.6	3.9
30 Aug-1 Sep 2018	YouGov	**36.8**	33.0	3.8	**33.2**	33.0	0.2
23-30 Aug 2018	Demoskop	**39.1**	38.2	0.9	**39.1**	38.2	0.9
30 Aug 2018	Sentio	**37.2**	34.4	2.8	**37.2**	34.4	2.8
28–30 Aug 2018	Sifo	**43.1**	37.3	5.8	**43.1**	37.3	5.8
25–30 Aug 2018	Inizio	38.8	**39.9**	1.1	38.8	**39.9**	1.1
27–29 Aug 2018	Sifo	**42.8**	37.1	5.7	**42.8**	37.1	5.7
22–29 Aug 2018	SKOP	**40.4**	35.7	4.7	**40.4**	35.7	4.7
23–28 Aug 2018	Sifo	**40.9**	37.7	3.2	**40.9**	37.7	3.2
21–28 Aug 2018	Novus	**40.2**	38.9	1.3	**40.2**	38.9	1.3
21–28 Aug 2018	SKOP	**39.8**	37.0	2.8	**39.8**	37.0	2.8
22–27 Aug 2018	Sifo	**40.9**	38.2	2.7	**40.9**	38.2	2.7
22–26 Aug 2018	Inizio	38.6	**39.8**	1.2	38.6	**39.8**	1.2
21–26 Aug 2018	Sifo	**41.1**	38.5	2.6	**41.1**	38.5	2.6
16–24 Aug 2018	Ipsos	**42.1**	35.9	6.2	**42.1**	35.9	6.2
20–23 Aug 2018	Sifo	**41.0**	38.5	2.5	**41.0**	38.5	2.5
16-22 Aug 2018	SKOP	**39.5**	36.2	3.3	**39.5**	36.2	3.3
13-21 Aug 2018	Novus	**40.0**	38.1	1.9	**40.0**	34.6	5.4
17-20 Aug 2018	YouGov	**36.2**	32.8	3.4	**36.2**	29.0	7.2
13-16 Aug 2018	Sifo	**41.0**	38.2	2.8	**41.0**	38.2	2.8
10-16 Aug 2018	Inizio	38.6	**39.3**	0.7	38.6	**39.3**	0.7
7-16 Aug 2018	Ipsos	**40.5**	37.7	2.8	**40.5**	37.7	2.8
8–15 Aug 2018	Demoskop	38.9	**39.2**	0.3	**38.9**	35.6	3.3
9-14 Aug 2018	Sentio	**37.8**	35.3	2.5	**37.8**	31.5	6.3
23 Jul–12 Aug 2018	Novus	**39.0**	36.6	2.4	**39.0**	33.6	5.4
6–9 Aug 2018	Sifo	**40.6**	39.9	0.7	**40.6**	36.6	4.0
25 Jul–2 Aug 2018	Inizio	38.4	**39.1**	0.7	38.4	**39.1**	0.7
27 Jul–1 Aug 2018	Sentio	**37.6**	33.0	4.6	**33.7**	30.6	3.1
25 Jun–22 Jul 2018	Novus	**39.5**	36.2	3.2	**39.5**	33.2	6.2
20 Jun–21 Jul 2018	SKOP	**39.7**	37.5	2.2	**36.2**	34.2	2.0
13–15 Jul 2018	YouGov	**33.7**	**33.7**	Tie	29.8	**29.9**	0.1
28 Jun–3 Jul 2018	Sentio	**35.8**	35.0	0.8	32.0	**35.0**	3.0
25 Jun–3 Jul 2018	Demoskop	**39.2**	36.5	2.7	**39.2**	34.0	5.2
20–26 Jun 2018	Inizio	36.7	**39.7**	3.0	32.8	**39.7**	6.9
7–24 Jun 2018	Novus	**38.0**	36.9	1.1	**38.0**	33.5	4.5
15–18 Jun 2018	YouGov	**35.1**	31.8	3.3	**31.3**	28.7	2.6
7–18 Jun 2018	Ipsos	38	**39**	1	**38**	36	3
8 May–18 Jun 2018	SKOP	38.4	**38.9**	1.3	**38.4**	35.4	3.0
4–14 Jun 2018	Sifo	**39.9**	38.7	1.2	**39.9**	36.3	3.6
29 May–6 Jun 2018	Demoskop	36.2	**38.5**	2.3	**36.2**	34.7	1.5
14 May–6 Jun 2018	Novus	37.4	**37.5**	0.1	**37.4**	34.6	2.8
1–5 Jun 2018	Sentio	**36.2**	34.6	1.6	**36.2**	31.3	4.9
21–30 May 2018	Inizio	36.6	**40.7**	4.1	32.7	**40.7**	8.0
27 Apr–29 May 2018	SCB	**40.0**	38.6	1.6	**40.0**	35.7	4.3
10–21 May 2018	Ipsos	37	**39**	2	37	**39**	2
7–17 May 2018	Sifo	38.5	**40.0**	1.5	**38.5**	36.5	2.0
11–14 May 2018	YouGov	**35.6**	**35.6**	Tie	32.0	**32.6**	0.6
16 Apr–13 May 2018	Novus	**39.6**	37.9	1.7	**39.6**	34.4	5.2
4–7 May 2018	Sentio	**38.9**	33.8	5.1	**38.9**	28.0	10.9
1–7 May 2018	Inizio	37.8	**40.4**	2.6	34.0	**40.4**	6.4
24 Apr–2 May 2018	Demoskop	38.4	**39.1**	0.7	**38.4**	36.2	2.2
12–23 Apr 2018	Ipsos	38	**41**	3	**38**	**38**	Tie
13–16 Apr 2018	YouGov	35.6	**36.0**	0.4	31.7	**32.8**	1.1
19 Mar–15 Apr 2018	Novus	39.0	**39.8**	0.8	**39.0**	36.3	2.7
16 Mar–13 Apr 2018	SKOP	37.2	**43.5**	6.3	33.7	**43.5**	9.8
2–12 Apr 2018	Sifo	**40.6**	40.5	0.1	**40.6**	37.1	3.5
5–10 Apr 2018	Sentio	**38.6**	33.3	5.3	**38.6**	30.9	7.7
3–9 Apr 2018	Inizio	37.8	**41.3**	3.5	**37.8**	37.4	0.4
27 Mar–4 Apr 2018	Demoskop	**39.8**	39.0	0.8	**39.8**	35.7	4.1
16–19 Mar 2018	YouGov	**36.2**	34.7	1.5	**36.2**	31.1	5.1
8–19 Mar 2018	Ipsos	**41**	39	2	**41**	36	5
19 Feb–18 Mar 2018	Novus	39.4	**40.1**	0.7	35.6	**36.9**	1.3
5–15 Mar 2018	Sifo	**40.5**	**40.5**	Tie	36.7	**37.5**	0.8
8–14 Mar 2018	Sentio	**37.4**	34.7	2.7	**37.4**	30.8	6.6
27 Feb–7 Mar 2018	Demoskop	**40.3**	38.1	2.2	**40.3**	34.8	5.5
1–5 Mar 2018	Inizio	36.6	**42.8**	6.2	33.3	**39.2**	5.9
16–19 Feb 2018	YouGov	35.8	**37.2**	1.4	32.4	**34.6**	2.2
8–19 Feb 2018	Ipsos	**41**	40	1	**38**	37	1
22 Jan–18 Feb 2018	Novus	**40.8**	39.8	1.0	**40.8**	37.1	3.7
5–15 Feb 2018	Sifo	39.1	**42.1**	2.1	39.1	**39.3**	0.2
9–14 Feb 2018	Sentio	36.9	**38.4**	1.5	33.6	**36.2**	2.6
30 Jan–6 Feb 2018	Demoskop	39.6	**41.7**	2.1	**39.6**	38.5	1.1
30 Jan–5 Feb 2018	Inizio	38.5	**42.0**	3.5	35.3	**42.0**	6.7
11 Jan–2 Feb 2018	SKOP	37.7	**44.3**	6.6	34.6	**40.8**	6.2
2–22 Jan 2018	Novus	40.3	**40.4**	0.1	**40.3**	37.7	2.6
10–21 Jan 2018	Ipsos	38	**42**	4	38	**39**	1
8–18 Jan 2018	Sifo	39.6	**41.2**	1.6	**39.6**	38.3	1.3
12–16 Jan 2018	Sentio	**37.9**	35.0	2.9	**34.1**	28.5	5.6
12–15 Jan 2018	YouGov	**38.5**	36.3	2.2	**38.5**	30.0	8.5
2–9 Jan 2018	Demoskop	**39.4**	39.1	0.3	**39.4**	36.2	3.2
3–8 Jan 2018	Inizio	39.3	**41.0**	1.7	35.7	**37.6**	1.9
27 Nov–21 Dec 2017	Novus	**41.3**	39.8	1.5	**41.3**	36.5	4.8
15–18 Dec 2017	YouGov	36.4	**38.8**	2.4	32.5	**35.5**	3.0
6–14 Dec 2017	Ipsos	**40**	**40**	Tie	**40**	37	3
4–14 Dec 2017	Sifo	**40.8**	39.9	0.9	**40.8**	37.2	3.6
6–12 Dec 2017	Inizio	37.4	**42.5**	5.1	34.3	**38.6**	4.3
1–6 Dec 2017	Sentio	34.9	**37.8**	2.9	31.0	**34.8**	3.8
28 Nov–5 Dec 2017	Demoskop	**39.5**	38.8	0.7	35.6	**35.8**	0.2
27 Oct–28 Nov 2017	SCB	**43.4**	39.2	4.2	**39.6**	36.1	3.5
30 Oct–26 Nov 2017	Novus	**40.9**	40.0	0.9	**40.9**	36.4	4.5
16–21 Nov 2017	Sentio	**39.1**	34.8	4.3	**39.1**	31.5	7.6
17–20 Nov 2017	YouGov	37.4	**37.9**	0.5	**37.4**	35.1	2.3
9–19 Nov 2017	Ipsos	**41**	40	1	**41**	37	4
8–13 Nov 2017	Inizio	39.4	**40.6**	1.2	**39.4**	37.3	2.1
30 Oct–9 Nov 2017	Sifo	40.9	**41.2**	0.3	**40.9**	38.1	2.8
25 Oct–1 Nov 2017	Demoskop	**40.1**	38.8	1.3	**40.1**	36.0	4.1
10–31 Oct 2017	SKOP	39.2	**42.3**	3.1	35.7	**38.9**	3.2
2–29 Oct 2017	Novus	**41.4**	40.0	1.4	**41.4**	36.2	5.2
20–23 Oct 2017	YouGov	36.1	**37.3**	1.2	32.9	**34.3**	1.4
12–22 Oct 2017	Ipsos	**41**	**41**	Tie	**41**	38	3
2–12 Oct 2017	Sifo	**42.6**	39.9	2.7	**38.8**	37.0	1.8
5–9 Oct 2017	Sentio	**38.7**	34.2	4.5	**38.7**	31.9	6.8
3–9 Oct 2017	Inizio	**39.9**	38.3	1.6	**36.7**	34.6	2.1
24 Sep–1 Oct 2017	Demoskop	**44.5**	38.1	6.4	**44.5**	34.4	10.1
4 Sep–1 Oct 2017	Novus	**41.6**	38.6	3.0	**41.6**	35.1	6.5
14–18 Sep 2017	YouGov	**36.9**	34.0	2.9	**33.8**	30.9	2.9
7–18 Sep 2017	Ipsos	**41**	37	4	**41**	34	7
4–14 Sep 2017	Sifo	**41.6**	37.8	3.8	**41.6**	34.1	7.5
8–11 Sep 2017	Sentio	**36.3**	**36.3**	Tie	**36.3**	33.2	3.1
1–6 Sep 2017	Inizio	**38.8**	37.1	1.7	**35.3**	33.5	1.8
29 Aug–5 Sep 2017	Demoskop	**42.9**	36.5	6.4	**42.9**	33.7	9.2
7 Aug–3 Sep 2017	Novus	**41.3**	37.6	3.7	**41.3**	33.7	7.6
10–21 Aug 2017	Ipsos	**42**	37	5	**42**	34	8
7–17 Aug 2017	Sifo	**40.5**	38.4	2.1	**40.5**	34.8	5.7
11–15 Aug 2017	YouGov	**37.9**	35.1	2.8	**37.9**	32.2	5.7
11–14 Aug 2017	Sentio	**36.4**	32.9	3.5	**36.4**	29.7	6.7
7–14 Aug 2017	Inizio	**38.1**	37.8	0.3	35.5	**37.8**	2.3
1–8 Aug 2017	Demoskop	40.2	**40.6**	0.4	40.2	**40.6**	0.4
31 Jul–6 Aug 2017	Novus	**40.8**	37.8	3.0	36.9	**37.8**	0.9
Jul 2017	YouGov	**37.0**	36.2	0.8	**37.0**	33.6	3.4
14–19 Jul 2017	Sentio	**35.4**	33.8	1.6	**31.6**	30.0	1.6
7 Jun–6 Jul 2017	SKOP	**38.8**	37.2	1.6	**38.8**	34.2	4.6
26 Jun–4 Jul 2017	Demoskop	**39.9**	37.0	2.9	**39.9**	34.4	5.5
16–29 Jun 2017	Inizio	37.2	**37.9**	0.7	34.1	**37.9**	3.8
5–25 Jun 2017	Novus	**40.2**	37.5	2.7	**40.2**	34.2	6.0
15–20 Jun 2017	YouGov	34.5	**37.7**	3.2	**34.5**	34.3	0.2
7–19 Jun 2017	Ipsos	**41**	38	3	**41**	35	6
5–15 Jun 2017	Sifo	**40.9**	38.9	2.0	**40.9**	36.0	4.9
6–13 Jun 2017	Inizio	37.2	**37.8**	0.6	34.1	**37.8**	3.7
30 May–7 Jun 2017	Demoskop	**39.7**	36.6	3.1	**39.7**	34.0	5.7
1–5 Jun 2017	Sentio	**35.7**	34.8	0.9	**32.6**	31.3	1.3
8 May–4 Jun 2017	Novus	**39.2**	38.6	0.6	**39.2**	35.5	3.7
28 Apr–28 May 2017	SCB	**41.9**	37.6	4.3	**41.9**	34.4	7.5
9–22 May 2017	Ipsos	38	**40**	2	35	**40**	5
10–17 May 2017	Inizio	35.9	**39.3**	3.4	32.9	**39.3**	6.4
11–15 May 2017	YouGov	35.5	**37.1**	1.6	33.4	**34.2**	0.8
2–11 May 2017	Sifo	**41.0**	38.6	2.4	**37.3**	35.9	1.4
5–8 May 2017	Sentio	**36.2**	35.8	0.4	**36.2**	33.3	2.9
17 Apr–7 May 2017	Novus	**40.1**	37.8	2.3	**40.1**	33.9	6.2
24 Apr–3 May 2017	Demoskop	38.9	**40.0**	1.1	**38.9**	36.3	2.6
24 Apr–1 May 2017	Inizio	36.3	**39.8**	3.5	33.4	**39.8**	6.4
18–27 Apr 2017	Sifo	**42.0**	39.9	2.1	**42.0**	37.3	4.7
3–19 Apr 2017	Ipsos	**40**	39	1	37	**39**	2
12–18 Apr 2017	YouGov	33.1	**37.6**	4.5	30.4	**34.0**	3.6
10–17 Apr 2017	Inizio	37.5	**38.3**	0.8	35.0	**38.3**	3.3
20 Mar–16 Apr 2017	Novus	**39.8**	37.6	2.2	**39.8**	34.2	5.6
3–12 Apr 2017	Sifo	**41.3**	39.6	1.7	**38.1**	36.7	1.4
7–10 Apr 2017	Sentio	**35.3**	33.0	2.3	**35.3**	29.3	6.0
28 Mar–5 Apr 2017	Demoskop	39.3	**40.1**	0.8	**39.3**	37.3	2.0
17–20 Mar 2017	YouGov	34.2	**37.4**	3.2	30.7	**34.4**	3.7
9–19 Mar 2017	Ipsos	39	**40**	1	**39**	37	2
20 Feb–19 Mar 2017	Novus	38.4	**39.3**	0.9	**38.4**	36.1	2.3
6–16 Mar 2017	Sifo	40.3	**41.1**	0.8	**40.3**	38.3	2.0
8–14 Mar 2017	Inizio	35.9	**38.4**	2.5	32.8	**38.4**	5.6
9–13 Mar 2017	Sentio	**36.4**	32.5	3.9	**33.0**	26.2	6.8
28 Feb–7 Mar 2017	Demoskop	**41.4**	36.8	4.6	**41.4**	33.8	7.6
17–20 Feb 2017	YouGov	35.5	**36.6**	1.1	31.6	**33.0**	1.4
16–20 Feb 2017	Sentio	**35.0**	**35.0**	Tie	31.4	**32.0**	0.6
8–20 Feb 2017	Ipsos	38	**41**	3	**38**	**38**	Tie
23 Jan–19 Feb 2017	Novus	**39.4**	39.0	0.4	**39.4**	35.9	3.5
6–16 Feb 2017	Sifo	39.3	**41.4**	2.1	**39.3**	37.8	1.5
5–14 Feb 2017	Inizio	36.0	**40.3**	4.3	32.3	**40.3**	8.0
31 Jan–8 Feb 2017	Demoskop	**40.6**	39.0	1.6	**40.6**	35.4	5.2
23 Jan–7 Feb 2017	Sifo	39.3	**41.2**	1.9	**39.3**	37.3	2.0
12–22 Jan 2017	Ipsos	38	**42**	4	38	**39**	1
2–22 Jan 2017	Novus	39.0	**40.4**	1.4	**39.0**	37.1	1.9
9–19 Jan 2017	Sifo	**42.0**	39.1	2.9	**42.0**	36.5	5.5
12–18 Jan 2017	Sentio	36.3	**36.7**	0.4	**36.3**	32.8	3.5
9–17 Jan 2017	Inizio	37.0	**39.4**	2.4	**37.0**	35.7	1.3
12–16 Jan 2017	YouGov	33.5	**37.7**	4.2	29.6	**34.9**	5.3
3–10 Jan 2017	Demoskop	39.5	**41.0**	1.5	**39.5**	38.4	1.1
16–20 Dec 2016	YouGov	34.7	**36.5**	1.8	31.5	**36.5**	5.0
21 Nov–18 Dec 2016	Novus	**39.6**	39.5	0.1	**39.6**	36.5	3.1
5–15 Dec 2016	Sifo	**41.2**	40.9	0.3	**41.2**	37.3	3.9
8–14 Dec 2016	Sentio	**36.6**	**36.6**	Tie	**33.0**	32.9	0.1
5–14 Dec 2016	Inizio	37.4	**39.7**	2.3	33.9	**39.7**	5.8
1–12 Dec 2016	Ipsos	38	**41**	3	**38**	**38**	Tie
29 Nov–6 Dec 2016	Demoskop	38.5	**39.4**	0.9	**38.5**	36.2	2.3
28 Oct–27 Nov 2016	SCB	**41.4**	38.0	3.4	**41.4**	34.9	6.5
17–22 Nov 2016	Sentio	32.9	**36.8**	3.9	29.9	**33.4**	3.5
10–21 Nov 2016	Ipsos	**41**	39	2	**41**	36	5
24 Oct–20 Nov 2016	Novus	39.2	**39.7**	0.5	**39.2**	36.7	2.5
7–17 Nov 2016	Sifo	39.4	**41.8**	2.4	**39.4**	38.3	1.1
7–15 Nov 2016	Inizio	37.8	**38.2**	0.4	**37.8**	34.7	3.1
11–14 Nov 2016	YouGov	33.1	**38.2**	5.1	29.8	**35.9**	6.1
25 Oct–2 Nov 2016	Demoskop	**40.9**	38.8	2.1	**40.9**	36.3	4.6
20–26 Oct 2016	Sentio	35.6	**38.3**	2.7	33.2	**38.3**	5.1
13–24 Oct 2016	Ipsos	38	**40**	2	**38**	**38**	Tie
26 Sep–23 Oct 2016	Novus	38.2	**39.8**	1.6	**38.2**	36.9	1.3
13–19 Oct 2016	Inizio	36.2	**40.3**	4.1	36.2	**36.4**	0.2
14–18 Oct 2016	YouGov	33.1	**38.8**	5.7	29.9	**38.8**	8.9
3–13 Oct 2016	Sifo	38.8	**41.5**	2.7	**38.8**	38.7	0.1
27 Sep–5 Oct 2016	Demoskop	39.2	**39.5**	0.3	**39.2**	35.8	3.4
29 Aug–25 Sep 2016	Novus	39.3	**40.1**	0.8	**39.3**	36.8	2.5
12–22 Sep 2016	Inizio	37.1	**41.0**	3.9	33.4	**37.1**	3.7
16–19 Sep 2016	YouGov	34.1	**37.0**	2.9	30.2	**34.1**	3.9
9–19 Sep 2016	Ipsos	37	**41**	4	37	**41**	4
5–15 Sep 2016	Sifo	39.8	**41.4**	1.6	**39.8**	38.4	1.4
8–13 Sep 2016	Sentio	34.9	**35.5**	0.6	**34.9**	32.7	2.2
30 Aug–7 Sep 2016	Demoskop	**40.4**	38.3	2.1	**40.4**	35.3	5.1
1–28 Aug 2016	Novus	38.5	**41.2**	2.7	**38.5**	38.0	0.5
14–22 Aug 2016	Ipsos	37	**41**	4	37	**38**	1
16–21 Aug 2016	Sentio	**37.2**	35.5	1.7	**33.7**	32.0	1.7
8–18 Aug 2016	Sifo	38.3	**43.1**	4.8	38.3	**43.1**	4.8
10–18 Aug 2016	Inizio	38.6	**41.2**	2.6	35.4	**37.4**	2.0
12–16 Aug 2016	YouGov	33.7	**37.1**	3.4	30.9	**34.0**	3.1
Jul 2016	YouGov	33.4	**38.3**	4.9	30.4	**31.3**	0.9
28 Jun–5 Jul 2016	Demoskop	38.3	**41.7**	3.4	38.3	**38.4**	0.1
30 May–26 Jun 2016	Novus	38.0	**40.5**	2.5	**38.0**	37.7	0.3
17–21 Jun 2016	YouGov	33.3	**39.1**	5.8	30.1	**35.8**	5.7
7–16 June 2016	Ipsos	38	**41**	3	**38**	**38**	Tie
7–16 Jun 2016	Sifo	37.9	**42.7**	4.8	37.9	**39.5**	1.6
6–15 Jun 2016	Inizio	37.0	**40.6**	3.6	33.4	**40.6**	7.2
31 May–8 Jun 2016	Demoskop	38.6	**40.3**	1.7	**38.6**	36.8	1.8
2–6 Jun 2016	Sentio	35.1	**35.7**	0.6	**35.1**	29.0	6.1
28 Apr–26 May 2016	SCB	**41.0**	39.3	1.7	**41.0**	36.2	4.8
9–29 May 2016	Novus	36.0	**43.1**	7.1	36.0	**39.9**	3.9
16–25 May 2016	Ipsos	38.8	**41.0**	2.2	35.3	**37.8**	2.5
19–23 May 2016	YouGov	32.8	**39.8**	7.0	30.0	**39.8**	9.8
12–18 May 2016	Sentio	**37.1**	35.3	1.8	**37.1**	31.6	5.5
9–19 May 2016	Inizio	38.3	**41.1**	2.8	38.3	**41.1**	2.8
2–12 May 2016	Sifo	38.5	**42.2**	3.7	38.5	**42.2**	3.7
18 Apr–8 May 2016	Novus	37.7	**41.5**	3.8	37.7	**38.2**	0.5
26 Apr–3 May 2016	Demoskop	38.0	**41.7**	3.7	38.0	**38.4**	0.4
25 Apr–3 May 2016	Sifo	39.0	**43.0**	3.9	39.0	**43.0**	3.9
15–19 Apr 2016	YouGov	**36.7**	36.5	0.2	**36.7**	30.2	6.5
14–25 Apr 2016	Ipsos	36.2	**43.8**	7.4	36.2	**40.5**	4.3
7–17 Apr 2016	Inizio	38.1	**39.7**	1.6	**38.1**	35.8	2.3
21 Mar–17 Apr 2016	Novus	38.7	**39.7**	1.0	**38.7**	36.6	2.1
6–13 Apr 2016	Sentio	**36.8**	35.7	1.1	**36.8**	32.7	4.1
4–14 Apr 2016	Sifo	39.9	**42.1**	2.2	**39.9**	38.6	1.3
29 Mar–6 Apr 2016	Demoskop	38.5	**43.1**	4.6	38.5	**39.6**	1.1
22 Feb–20 Mar 2016	Novus	38.7	**39.1**	0.4	**38.7**	35.7	3.0
10–20 Mar 2016	Ipsos	**41.3**	41.0	0.3	**41.3**	37.4	3.9
15–22 Mar 2016	Inizio	**39.1**	38.8	0.3	**39.1**	38.8	0.3
11–14 Mar 2016	YouGov	34.1	**37.6**	3.5	**34.1**	30.3	3.8
16 Feb–10 Mar 2016	SKOP	**40.7**	40.6	0.1	**40.7**	40.6	0.1
3–9 Mar 2016	Sentio	35.2	**35.5**	0.3	**35.2**	32.2	3.0
29 Feb–10 Mar 2016	Sifo	39.7	**41.6**	1.9	**39.7**	38.0	1.7
23 Feb–2 Mar 2016	Demoskop	39.2	**39.9**	0.7	**39.2**	36.8	2.4
11–21 Feb 2016	Ipsos	38.1	**42.6**	4.5	38.1	**39.2**	1.1
25 Jan–21 Feb 2016	Novus	36.9	**40.9**	4.0	36.9	**37.4**	0.5
7–17 Feb 2016	Inizio	35.6	**40.1**	4.5	35.6	**40.1**	4.5
12–15 Feb 2016	YouGov	34.5	**36.1**	1.6	**34.5**	32.5	2.0
1–11 Feb 2016	Sifo	39.2	**42.0**	2.8	**39.2**	38.5	0.7
3–9 Feb 2016	Sentio	32.7	**36.1**	3.4	32.7	**33.1**	0.4
26 Jan–2 Feb 2016	Demoskop	35.7	**42.6**	6.9	35.7	**39.6**	3.9
14–25 Jan 2016	Ipsos	37.8	**42.3**	4.5	37.8	**39.6**	1.8
4–24 Jan 2016	Novus	36.7	**40.0**	3.3	**36.7**	36.4	0.3
11–21 Jan 2016	Sifo	37.2	**42.8**	5.6	37.2	**42.8**	5.6
15–18 Jan 2016	YouGov	33.3	**35.3**	2.0	**33.3**	32.2	1.1
12–19 Jan 2016	Inizio	35.8	**39.6**	3.7	35.8	**39.6**	3.7
7–13 Jan 2016	Sentio	**35.2**	34.7	0.5	**35.2**	28.0	7.2
5–12 Jan 2016	Demoskop	38.5	**40.3**	1.8	**38.5**	37.4	1.1
7–28 Dec 2015	SKOP	39.6	**41.5**	1.9	**39.6**	38.2	1.4
7–17 Dec 2015	Sifo	**39.9**	38.6	1.3	**39.9**	35.1	4.8
10–16 Dec 2015	Sentio	**36.0**	33.4	2.6	**36.0**	30.4	5.6
9–16 Dec 2015	Inizio	35.1	**40.1**	5.0	35.1	**36.4**	1.3
10–14 Dec 2015	YouGov	34.1	**35.5**	1.4	**34.1**	32.7	1.4
3–14 Dec 2015	Ipsos	37.3	**41.3**	4.0	37.3	**37.5**	0.2
23 Nov–13 Dec 2015	Novus	37.3	**37.7**	0.4	**37.3**	34.2	3.1
24 Nov–2 Dec 2015	Demoskop	**39.7**	39.0	0.7	**39.7**	35.4	4.3
2–25 Nov 2015	SCB	**39.0**	**39.0**	Tie	**39.0**	35.5	3.5
13–23 Nov 2015	Ipsos	**41.5**	39.4	2.1	**41.5**	36.1	5.4
26 Oct–22 Nov 2015	Novus	37.9	**38.6**	0.7	**37.9**	34.8	3.1
9–19 Nov 2015	Sifo	39.2	**41.1**	1.9	**39.2**	37.2	2.0
13–16 Nov 2015	YouGov	33.6	**36.7**	3.1	**33.6**	33.1	0.5
9–16 Nov 2015	Inizio	37.0	**40.2**	3.3	37.0	**40.2**	3.3
5–10 Nov 2015	Sentio	34.0	**34.8**	0.8	**34.0**	31.9	2.1
27 Oct–4 Nov 2015	Demoskop	**39.7**	37.9	1.8	**39.7**	34.4	5.3
28 Sep–25 Oct 2015	Novus	**39.2**	38.0	1.2	**39.2**	34.1	5.1
15–26 Oct 2015	Ipsos	**40.9**	38.7	2.2	**40.9**	35.4	5.5
4–21 Oct 2015	SKOP	40.1	**42.0**	1.9	**40.1**	38.3	1.8
12–20 Oct 2015	Inizio	37.2	**40.0**	2.8	37.2	**40.0**	2.8
5–15 Oct 2015	Sifo	39.0	**41.1**	2.1	**39.0**	37.4	1.6
8–12 Oct 2015	YouGov	35.1	**36.4**	1.3	**35.1**	32.5	2.6
1–8 Oct 2015	Sentio	**36.4**	34.0	2.4	**36.4**	32.1	4.3
29 Sep–6 Oct 2015	Demoskop	**38.8**	38.1	0.7	**38.8**	34.6	4.2
16–24 Sep 2015	Inizio	37.8	**38.0**	0.2	**37.8**	34.5	3.3
9–20 Sep 2015	Ipsos	**41.2**	39.3	1.9	**41.2**	36.3	4.9
7–17 Sep 2015	Sifo	**41.5**	38.2	3.3	**41.5**	34.5	7.0
10–14 Sep 2015	YouGov	33.3	**36.1**	2.8	**33.3**	32.4	0.9
24 Aug–13 Sep 2015	Novus	**39.1**	37.2	1.9	**39.1**	34.0	5.1
3–9 Sep 2015	Sentio	**35.7**	33.1	2.6	**35.7**	30.5	5.2
2–9 Sep 2015	Inizio	35.9	**40.1**	4.2	35.9	**40.1**	4.2
25 Aug–2 Sep 2015	Demoskop	38.1	**39.0**	0.9	**38.1**	35.5	2.6
14–24 Aug 2015	Ipsos	**40.3**	38.9	1.4	**40.3**	35.4	4.9
3–23 Aug 2015	Novus	**39.1**	38.5	0.6	**39.1**	35.2	3.9
10–20 Aug 2015	Sifo	**40.4**	39.3	1.1	**40.4**	39.3	1.1
13–19 Aug 2015	Sentio	**37.4**	35.5	1.9	**37.4**	33.5	3.9
11–19 Aug 2015	Inizio	37.7	**38.7**	1.0	37.7	**38.7**	1.0
14–17 Aug 2015	YouGov	**36.6**	34.7	1.9	**36.6**	31.0	5.6
16–22 Jul 2015	Sentio	**36.9**	35.0	1.9	**36.9**	31.9	5.0
10–13 Jul 2015	YouGov	35.7	**38.9**	3.2	35.7	**38.9**	3.2
30 Jun–7 Jul 2015	Demoskop	**39.4**	38.7	0.7	**39.4**	38.7	0.7
8–25 Jun 2015	SKOP	**42.9**	41.0	1.9	**42.9**	37.4	5.5
20–24 Jun 2015	Inizio	**39.8**	39.5	0.3	**39.8**	36.4	3.4
5–15 Jun 2015	Ipsos	40.0	**40.5**	0.5	**40.0**	37.8	2.2
18 May–14 Jun 2015	Novus	38.9	**40.3**	1.4	38.9	**40.3**	1.4
11–17 Jun 2015	Sentio	**37.6**	35.9	1.7	**37.6**	30.1	7.5
12–15 Jun 2015	YouGov	37.4	**38.8**	1.4	**37.4**	35.4	2.0
1–11 Jun 2015	Sifo	39.9	**41.6**	1.7	39.9	**41.6**	1.7
27 May–3 Jun 2015	Demoskop	39.5	**41.8**	2.3	**39.5**	38.1	1.4
1–30 May 2015	SCB	**42.8**	40.6	2.2	**42.8**	36.9	5.9
30 May 2015	Sentio	36.3	**39.2**	2.9	36.3	**37.0**	0.7
12–25 May 2015	Ipsos	41.3	**41.8**	0.5	**41.3**	38.3	3.0
10–25 May 2015	Inizio	39.2	**40.4**	1.2	39.2	**40.4**	1.2
13–18 May 2015	YouGov	**38.2**	37.9	0.3	**38.2**	34.4	3.8
20 Apr–17 May 2015	Novus	39.8	**40.4**	0.6	**39.8**	36.9	2.9
4–12 May 2015	Sifo	**41.6**	40.5	1.7	**41.6**	37.3	1.7
28 Apr–6 May 2015	Demoskop	40.4	**41.5**	1.1	40.4	**41.5**	1.1
22–30 Apr 2015	Inizio	39.2	**41.0**	1.8	39.2	**41.0**	1.8
16–27 Apr 2015	Ipsos	**41.1**	40.8	0.3	**41.1**	40.8	0.3
17 Apr–20 Apr 2015	YouGov	**38.4**	**38.4**	Tie	**38.4**	34.7	3.7
23 Mar–19 Apr 2015	Novus	**41.0**	40.0	1.0	**41.0**	36.3	4.7
7–15 Apr 2015	Inizio	**41.5**	39.6	1.9	**41.5**	36.1	5.4
7–16 Apr 2015	Sifo	**42.9**	40.7	2.2	**42.9**	36.8	6.1
16 Apr 2015	Sentio	38.6	**38.7**	0.1	**38.6**	35.2	3.4
31 Mar–8 Apr 2015	Demoskop	**41.3**	40.5	0.8	**41.3**	36.7	4.6
2–12 Mar 2015	Sifo	**42.9**	39.6	3.3	**42.9**	39.6	3.3
23 Feb–22 Mar 2015	Novus	**42.8**	38.9	3.9	**42.8**	38.9	3.9
9–17 Mar 2015	Ipsos	**44.5**	39.1	5.0	**44.5**	35.3	9.2
13–16 Mar 2015	YouGov	**40.5**	37.2	3.3	**40.5**	37.2	3.3
19 Feb–11 Mar 2015	SKOP	**44.0**	40.5	3.5	**44.0**	36.9	7.1
5–12 Mar 2015	Inizio	**40.9**	39.7	1.2	**40.9**	35.9	5.0
5–11 Mar 2015	Sentio	**42.5**	37.5	5.0	**42.5**	33.7	8.8
24 Feb–4 Mar 2015	Demoskop	**43.3**	38.8	4.5	**43.3**	35.1	8.2
26 Jan–22 Feb 2015	Novus	**44.0**	37.9	6.1	**44.0**	37.9	6.1
Feb 2015	Sentio	**41.6**	37.5	4.1	**41.6**	33.8	7.8
2–11 Feb 2015	Inizio	**41.6**	40.6	1.0	**41.6**	36.7	4.9
2–12 Feb 2015	Sifo	**44.0**	39.0	5.0	**44.0**	39.0	5.0
5–9 Feb 2015	YouGov	**42.2**	36.4	5.8	**42.2**	32.9	9.3
27 Jan–4 Feb 2015	Demoskop	**44.0**	39.3	4.7	**44.0**	39.3	4.7
12–26 Jan 2015	Ipsos	**46.4**	38.2	8.2	**46.4**	34.4	12.0
12–22 Jan 2015	Sifo	**44.0**	38.6	5.4	**44.0**	34.9	9.1
22 Dec–18 Jan 2015	Novus	**41.7**	38.7	3.0	**41.7**	38.7	3.0
7–16 Jan 2015	Inizio	**43.8**	39.3	4.5	**43.8**	35.8	8.0
8–13 Jan 2015	Sentio	**42.3**	37.8	4.5	**42.3**	33.9	8.4
7–8 Jan 2015	Sifo	**45.6**	38.2	7.4	**45.6**	34.8	10.8
30 Dec–7 Jan 2015	Demoskop	**44.2**	38.6	5.6	**44.2**	38.6	5.6
19–27 Dec 2014	YouGov	**42.3**	38.1	4.2	**42.3**	34.4	7.9
8–18 Dec 2014	Sifo	**44.3**	40.0	4.3	**44.3**	36.3	8.0
11–17 Dec 2014	Inizio	40.7	**42.9**	2.2	40.7	**42.9**	2.2
8–15 Dec 2014	Ipsos	**44.1**	40.8	3.3	**44.1**	36.9	7.2
3–14 Dec 2014	Novus	**43.3**	38.5	4.8	**43.3**	34.6	8.7
4–10 Dec 2014	Sentio	**42.0**	37.6	4.4	**42.0**	30.0	12.0
4–10 Dec 2014	Inizio	41.1	**43.4**	2.3	41.1	**43.4**	2.3
4–5 Dec 2014	YouGov	**41.2**	38.0	3.2	**41.2**	38.0	3.2
25 Nov–3 Dec 2014	Demoskop	41.6	**41.7**	0.1	41.6	**41.7**	0.1
17 Nov–2 Dec 2014	Inizio	**43.5**	40.6	2.9	**43.5**	36.9	6.6
25–30 Nov 2014	Sentio	**42.3**	38.6	3.7	**42.3**	36.3	6.0
29 Oct–25 Nov 2014	SCB	**45.1**	39.2	6.3	**45.1**	35.5	9.6
13–24 Nov 2014	Ipsos	**42.1**	41.9	0.2	**42.1**	39.1	3.0
4–24 Nov 2014	SKOP	**43.8**	41.6	2.2	**43.8**	41.6	2.2
10–20 Nov 2014	Sifo	**42.7**	41.1	1.6	**42.7**	37.2	5.5
13 Oct–9 Nov 2014	Novus	**42.8**	42.1	0.7	**42.8**	42.1	0.7
28 Oct–5 Nov 2014	Demoskop	**42.4**	40.3	2.1	**42.4**	40.3	2.1
15–30 Oct 2014	Inizio	**43.8**	39.6	4.2	**43.8**	39.6	4.2
9–21 Oct 2014	Ipsos	**44.8**	39.3	5.5	**44.8**	35.4	9.4
6–16 Oct 2014	Sifo	**43.7**	40.2	3.5	**43.7**	40.2	3.5
15 Sep–12 Oct 2014	Novus	**43.1**	40.2	2.9	**43.1**	40.2	2.9
2–8 Oct 2014	Sentio	**39.4**	38.1	1.3	**39.4**	35.3	4.1
30 Sep–7 Oct 2014	Demoskop	**44.4**	39.3	5.1	**44.4**	35.4	9.0
17–24 Sep 2014	Ipsos	**44.0**	39.9	4.1	**44.0**	39.9	4.1
17–21 Sep 2014	Demoskop	**43.4**	40.9	2.5	**43.4**	40.9	2.5
14 Sep 2014	General election	**43.6**	39.4	4.2	**43.6**	39.4	4.2

== See also ==
- Opinion polling for the 2014 Swedish general election
- Opinion polling for the 2022 Swedish general election
