= Opinion polling for the 2014 Swedish general election =

In the run up to the 2014 Swedish general election, various organisations carried out opinion polling to gauge voting intention in Sweden. Results of such polls are displayed in this article.

The date range for these opinion polls are from the previous general election, held on 19 September 2010, to the day the next election was held, on 14 September 2014.

== Graphical summary ==
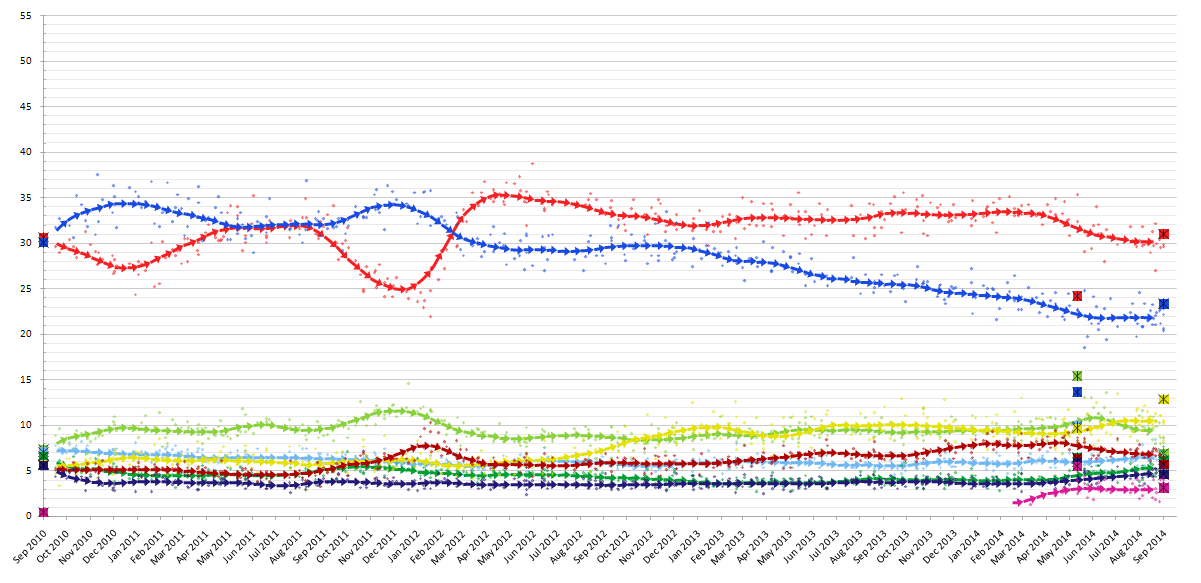
15-day average trend line of poll results from September 2010 to September 2014, with each line corresponding to a political party.

== Poll results ==
Poll results are listed in the table below in reverse chronological order, showing the most recent first, and using the date the survey's fieldwork was done, as opposed to the date of publication. If that date is unknown, the date of publication is given instead. The highest percentage figure in each polling survey is displayed in bold, and the background shaded in the leading party's colour. If a tie occurs, then no figure is shaded. The lead column on the right shows the percentage-point difference between the two parties with the highest figures. When a specific poll does not show a data figure for a party, the party's cell corresponding to that poll is shown empty.

Date	Polling firm	S	M	Mp	Fp	C	Sd	V	Kd	Fi	Others	Lead
**14 Sep 2014**	**General Election**	**31.0**	**23.3**	**6.9**	**5.4**	**6.1**	**12.9**	**5.7**	**4.6**	**3.1**	**1.0**	**7.7**
14 Sep (20:00)	Novus	**30.7**	22.8	8.1	6.8	7.7	8.3	5.2	5.7	4.4	0.3	7.9
14 Sep (20:00)	SVT	**31.1**	22.2	7.1	6.0	6.5	10.5	6.6	5.0	4.0	1.0	8.9
14 Sep (19:30)	YouGov	**29.9**	20.4	8.6	6.5	7.2	10.2	6.5	5.6	3.6	1.5	9.5
14 Sep (16:00)	YouGov	**29.6**	20.6	8.7	6.4	7.1	10.4	6.6	5.2	3.7	1.8	9.0
Exit polls
5–12 Sep	SKOP	**31.2**	24.6	7.7	6.7	6.5	8.0	6.5	4.6	3.5	0.7	6.6
10–11 Sep	Sifo	**31.1**	21.2	8.3	6.8	6.5	10.3	6.3	5.5	3.0	1.2	9.9
8–11 Sep	United Minds	**31.1**	22.8	8.7	5.5	5.8	11.1	5.7	5.4	3.3	0.7	8.3
6–11 Sep	Demoskop	**29.2**	20.9	9.7	5.9	6.8	10.2	7.2	4.9	3.9	1.4	8.3
8–10 Sep	YouGov	**29.5**	21.2	8.0	6.2	6.4	11.1	6.8	5.8	4.0	1.1	8.3
8–9 Sep	Sifo	**30.4**	22.6	10.3	7.2	7.0	8.9	6.8	4.5	1.6	0.8	7.8
5–9 Sep	United Minds	**29.6**	21.0	7.5	6.9	6.5	11.1	7.2	5.7	3.4	1.3	8.6
2–8 Sep	Sentio	**29.1**	20.7	8.8	5.6	6.5	12.7	7.4	5.1		4.1	8.4
2–8 Sep	Demoskop	**28.6**	20.4	10.0	6.6	6.1	11.8	5.9	5.0	3.7	1.9	8.2
25 Aug–6 Sep	Novus	**30.0**	22.4	9.9	6.2	5.1	10.4	7.2	4.8	2.6	1.3	7.6
31 Aug–5 Sep	United Minds	**30.5**	21.1	8.8	6.5	4.6	11.4	7.3	5.4	2.8	1.5	9.4
2–4 Sep	YouGov	**32.2**	21.1	8.0	6.6	4.4	11.3	6.7	5.2	3.0	1.5	11.1
1–4 Sep	Sifo	**27.0**	22.1	10.5	8.4	4.7	10.4	7.5	5.3	1.8	2.2	4.9
21 Aug–4 Sep	SKOP	**32.0**	22.2	7.9	5.8	5.3	9.4	8.3	5.1	2.4	1.6	9.8
25 Aug–2 Sep	Demoskop	**30.7**	22.2	10.6	5.1	4.6	10.8	7.2	5.0	2.5	1.4	8.5
22 Aug–1 Sep	Ipsos	**29.7**	21.7	11.0	6.3	4.4	9.7	7.4	4.5	4.0	1.3	8.0
25–31 Aug	Novus	**30.2**	23.3	9.6	6.4	5.3	10.6	7.1	4.4	2.1	1.0	6.9
24–31 Aug	United Minds	**31.3**	21.1	8.4	7.2	5.7	10.2	6.8	5.1	2.9	1.3	7.3
25–28 Aug	Sifo	**29.0**	22.6	11.0	5.8	5.9	11.0	6.1	4.5	2.9	1.2	6.4
17–24 Aug	United Minds	**30.0**	21.5	9.0	6.8	4.4	11.5	7.0	4.8	3.4	1.6	8.5
15–21 Aug	Demoskop	**29.9**	23.4	9.8	5.6	4.7	12.2	6.5	3.6	3.0	1.3	6.5
11–18 Aug	United Minds	**29.7**	20.8	9.9	7.9	5.6	10.9	6.9	4.6	2.3	1.5	8.9
7–18 Aug	Ipsos	**31.8**	20.8	11.6	6.5	4.0	9.4	7.0	4.3	3.4	1.2	11.0
11–14 Aug	Sifo	**30.3**	24.6	11.1	6.7	3.8	10.1	7.9	3.4	2.0	0.3	5.7
6–12 Aug	Sentio	**30.1**	21.2	8.3	5.6	4.7	11.8	7.4	4.7	4.0	2.2	8.9
3 Aug–10 Aug	United Minds	**29.6**	19.8	9.8	7.5	5.2	11.6	7.2	4.3	2.9	2.0	9.8
2 Jul–5 Aug	YouGov	**30.3**	23.4	9.4	6.0	5.2	9.3	6.6	5.0	3.6	1.2	6.7
7 Jul–3 Aug	Novus	**31.8**	22.4	9.9	6.1	5.8	8.8	7.3	4.2	2.6	1.1	9.4
10–16 Jul	Sentio	**29.9**	20.8	8.3	6.1	3.7	13.5	8.5	5.5		3.7	9.1
4–7 Jul	Sifo	**30.7**	23.9	11.4	6.1	4.6	9.0	6.6	4.3	2.6	0.8	6.8
24 Jun–2 Jul	Demoskop	**31.5**	19.4	13.6	6.5	4.5	9.2	7.2	4.2	2.8	1.2	12.1
9–30 Jun	United Minds	**28.0**	22.8	11.9	5.0	4.8	10.5	7.5	4.4	4.0	1.2	7.2
2–22 Jun	Ipsos	**31.1**	20.5	11.3	6.3	5.6	9.6	7.4	3.3	3.7	1.3	10.6
26 May–22 Jun	Novus	**32.1**	21.2	11.3	6.8	5.6	8.3	6.7	4.4	2.9	0.7	11.9
12–19 Jun	Sentio	**34.0**	23.0	9.7	5.6	4.8	12.5	6.3	3.6		0.5	11.0
29 May–15 Jun	SKOP	**31.9**	24.2	12.0	7.3	4.9	7.8	6.7	3.2	1.8	0.2	7.7
2–12 Jun	Sifo	**29.4**	21.2	13.0	6.8	5.5	9.0	6.4	3.5	3.4	1.9	8.2
12 May–8 Jun	United Minds	**30.8**	19.7	11.2	5.8	3.5	11.3	9.5	4.9	2.1	1.1	11.1
27 May–4 Jun	Demoskop	**29.1**	18.5	13.0	5.7	5.3	10.0	8.1	4.8	4.4	1.1	10.6
7 May–3 Jun	YouGov	**31.2**	24.8	8.3	5.1	4.8	8.2	8.5	5.0	3.6	0.6	6.4
**25 May 2014**	**EP Election**	**24.2**	**13.7**	**15.4**	**9.9**	**6.5**	**9.7**	**6.3**	**5.9**	**5.5**	**2.9**	**8.8**
8–25 May	Ipsos	**31.3**	22.6	10.2	5.8	4.3	7.8	8.7	4.5	3.9	0.9	8.7
2–25 May	SCB	**35.3**	22.7	8.0	5.3	4.9	8.1	8.0	3.9	2.5	1.4	12.6
28 Apr–25 May	Novus	**32.4**	24.3	10.1	6.0	3.9	7.7	8.3	4.2		3.1	8.1
5–15 May	Sifo	**30.9**	23.2	10.3	7.0	5.0	8.8	7.3	3.5	2.9	1.2	7.7
8–14 May	Sentio	**32.6**	24.5	9.0	4.5	2.8	11.7	9.2	4.5		1.2	8.1
7 Apr–8 May	United Minds	**34.6**	21.6	8.5	6.1	3.3	10.7	8.9	3.2		3.0	13.0
29 Apr–7 May	Demoskop	**32.2**	22.6	10.2	6.0	4.3	8.2	8.7	3.9	3.0	1.0	9.6
9 Apr–6 May	YouGov	**33.3**	22.2	6.9	6.2	3.9	10.6	8.7	4.1	2.6	1.6	11.1
7–27 Apr	Ipsos	**33.1**	24.6	9.9	5.4	3.6	7.6	9.4	3.0	2.3	3.4	8.5
26 Mar–24 Apr	SKOP	**34.9**	23.4	10.7	7.8	4.5	7.3	6.4	2.7		2.4	11.5
24 Mar–20 Apr	Novus	**33.5**	23.7	10.8	5.4	4.0	8.8	7.6	3.6		2.6	9.8
9–16 Apr	Sentio	**34.2**	21.9	8.3	7.1	3.9	10.9	8.8	3.9		0.9	12.3
31 Mar–10 Apr	Sifo	**32.1**	24.5	10.6	6.7	3.8	8.3	8.4	3.6		2.2	7.6
5 Mar–8 Apr	YouGov	**33.0**	23.3	8.4	5.0	4.3	11.4	8.1	3.8		2.7	9.7
10 Mar–6 Apr	United Minds	**33.4**	22.4	9.2	6.3	4.4	10.7	7.3	3.5		2.8	11.0
25 Mar–2 Apr	Demoskop	**33.0**	24.0	10.7	5.9	3.7	8.5	8.2	3.7		2.3	9.0
28 Feb–28 Mar	APO	**35.0**	22.4	9.9	6.3	3.9	8.0	8.2	3.4	1.4	1.4	12.6
6–25 Mar	Ipsos	**33.5**	23.6	10.4	6.9	4.1	7.8	7.6	3.7	1.3	2.5	9.9
24 Feb–23 Mar	Novus	**34.3**	25.1	9.2	6.3	3.6	9.3	6.5	3.9		1.8	9.2
6–13 Mar	Sentio	**33.2**	22.7	8.3	5.1	4.0	13.1	9.1	2.7		1.8	10.5
3–13 Mar	Sifo	**34.1**	24.2	10.1	5.4	4.7	8.0	6.3	4.7		2.5	9.9
10 Feb–9 Mar	United Minds	**33.0**	22.7	10.4	6.7	4.8	9.4	7.0	3.5		2.6	10.3
25 Feb–5 Mar	Demoskop	**32.7**	22.6	12.5	5.1	3.6	10.0	8.4	3.3		1.8	10.1
9 Feb–4 Mar	SKOP	**33.8**	26.5	9.9	4.6	4.1	8.2	8.0	3.1		1.7	7.3
5 Feb–4 Mar	YouGov	**33.0**	23.7	8.6	5.2	4.6	11.5	8.3	3.9		1.4	9.3
6–25 Feb	Ipsos	**35.1**	24.7	9.0	6.0	3.5	7.9	7.9	3.5		2.3	10.4
27 Jan–23 Feb	Novus	**33.3**	25.7	9.7	4.7	4.2	8.7	8.4	3.8		1.5	7.6
3–13 Feb	Sifo	**34.9**	22.8	9.7	6.7	2.8	9.5	8.2	3.7		1.6	12.1
13 Jan–9 Feb	United Minds	**31.2**	21.6	10.2	7.0	3.8	11.2	8.2	4.4		2.4	9.6
28 Jan–5 Feb	Demoskop	**34.5**	24.9	9.6	5.0	4.3	8.8	7.3	4.0		1.7	9.6
8 Jan–4 Feb	YouGov	**32.3**	25.0	8.0	6.0	4.4	10.3	9.3	3.5		1.3	7.3
9–28 Jan	Ipsos	**34.0**	25.0	9.9	6.4	3.1	7.3	9.1	3.4		1.7	9.0
6–26 Jan	Novus	**33.8**	24.5	9.2	5.1	3.5	11.0	8.1	3.5		1.3	9.3
13–23 Jan	Sifo	**32.9**	25.4	9.4	6.5	3.7	9.2	8.3	3.3		1.3	7.5
9 Dec–12 Jan	United Minds	**32.5**	24.0	8.9	6.1	4.5	10.8	8.4	3.3		1.5	8.5
2–8 Jan	Demoskop	**34.7**	22.3	11.1	5.8	4.5	9.8	6.5	3.6		1.8	12.4
9 Dec–7 Jan	SKOP	**32.7**	27.2	9.7	6.3	4.5	8.4	7.0	3.1		1.0	5.5
4 Dec–7 Jan	YouGov	**31.9**	25.7	7.9	5.7	5.2	10.0	7.6	4.3		1.7	6.2
2014
28 Nov–17 Dec	Ipsos	**32.8**	25.1	10.6	5.5	4.8	8.2	7.0	3.8		2.1	7.7
25 Nov–15 Dec	Novus	**34.2**	25.0	9.3	5.5	3.9	10.4	6.4	4.1		1.2	9.2
2–12 Dec	Sifo	**32.5**	25.2	11.0	5.5	4.4	9.3	7.8	3.6		0.8	7.3
11 Nov–8 Dec	United Minds	**32.4**	24.1	8.0	7.6	4.0	10.0	8.0	4.6		1.4	8.3
26 Nov–4 Dec	Demoskop	**33.1**	23.4	8.3	7.0	3.5	10.5	8.3	4.2		1.6	9.7
6 Nov–3 Dec	YouGov	**33.1**	23.8	9.2	6.3	3.0	12.8	7.2	3.7		1.0	9.3
3–27 Nov	SCB	**34.3**	25.5	8.8	5.4	4.7	9.3	6.7	4.1		1.3	8.8
7–26 Nov	Ipsos	**33.4**	25.3	10.1	6.2	4.2	8.5	7.1	3.7		1.4	8.1
28 Oct–24 Nov	Novus	**33.9**	24.2	9.1	6.2	4.3	9.4	7.2	4.4		1.3	9.7
4–14 Nov	Sifo	**34.5**	25.0	9.1	5.9	4.1	9.0	7.3	3.9		1.2	9.5
14 Oct–11 Nov	United Minds	**30.9**	25.8	9.6	6.7	4.1	10.8	7.1	4.4		0.7	5.1
29 Oct–6 Nov	Demoskop	**31.1**	25.6	11.8	5.3	3.0	11.9	6.4	3.9		1.0	5.5
10 Oct–5 Nov	YouGov	**32.5**	25.8	8.3	6.0	4.5	11.3	7.5	3.0		1.0	6.7
14 Oct–4 Nov	SKOP	**35.2**	25.6	8.9	5.9	3.5	9.3	6.9	3.6		1.3	9.6
10–29 Oct	Ipsos	**34.0**	27.4	9.6	5.3	4.0	8.5	6.3	3.2		1.8	6.6
30 Sep–27 Oct	Novus	**34.8**	26.0	8.8	5.2	3.0	10.1	6.0	4.5		1.6	8.8
16 Sep–13 Oct	United Minds	**33.7**	23.6	9.4	5.0	5.9	11.1	6.2	3.3		1.9	10.1
30 Sep–10 Oct	Sifo	**35.6**	25.0	7.9	6.0	3.8	9.7	6.4	4.0		1.6	10.6
4 Sep–8 Oct	YouGov	**31.2**	25.6	8.6	4.7	5.6	12.9	6.7	3.9		0.8	5.6
24 Sep–2 Oct	Demoskop	**33.2**	26.6	10.1	5.2	4.2	9.9	6.6	3.1		1.2	6.6
2–29 Sep	Novus	**35.1**	26.5	8.3	4.6	3.4	10.0	6.7	4.3		1.1	8.6
5–24 Sep	Ipsos	**34.4**	24.7	10.3	6.1	3.5	8.5	7.0	4.5		1.1	9.7
16 Aug–15 Sep	United Minds	**32.6**	25.3	9.4	5.3	3.4	12.1	6.2	4.2		1.6	7.3
2–12 Sep	Sifo	**33.5**	25.7	10.0	6.3	3.6	9.4	6.4	3.6		1.5	7.8
28 Aug–12 Sep	SKOP	**31.7**	26.6	10.8	6.7	4.2	9.4	6.3	3.2		1.2	5.1
27 Aug–3 Sep	Demoskop	**31.7**	25.1	10.1	6.6	4.5	10.1	7.1	3.7		1.1	6.6
7 Aug–3 Sep	YouGov	**30.8**	25.8	8.8	5.3	4.9	11.4	8.2	3.0		1.5	5.0
5 Aug–1 Sep	Novus	**34.3**	24.6	8.6	6.5	4.6	8.5	7.3	4.6		1.0	9.7
8–27 Aug	Ipsos	**34.4**	25.6	9.7	5.8	4.1	8.4	6.9	3.5		1.6	8.8
12–22 Aug	Sifo	**30.5**	26.6	10.9	5.9	4.0	9.9	6.5	3.8		1.9	3.9
22 Jul–15 Aug	United Minds	**33.2**	24.5	9.1	4.6	4.9	11.3	6.1	4.5		1.9	8.7
3 Jul–6 Aug	YouGov	**30.8**	28.4	9.3	5.4	3.6	9.9	7.4	4.0		1.1	2.4
8 Jul–4 Aug	Novus	**34.1**	26.2	9.7	5.4	3.9	9.0	6.3	4.0		1.4	7.9
25 Jun–3 Jul	Demoskop	**33.7**	25.3	8.9	5.6	3.2	11.6	7.8	3.0		0.9	8.4
5 Jun–2 Jul	YouGov	**30.9**	26.5	9.5	6.7	3.2	11.2	8.4	3.0		0.6	4.4
10–25 Jun	Ipsos	**33.1**	26.5	10.5	6.4	4.1	7.3	6.6	4.3		1.1	6.6
27 May–23 Jun	Novus	**34.4**	26.6	8.7	5.4	3.8	9.0	6.7	4.4		1.0	7.8
20 May–16 Jun	United Minds	**32.0**	25.8	8.9	6.3	3.7	10.7	7.2	3.8		1.7	6.2
3–13 Jun	Sifo	**31.0**	28.3	11.0	6.0	4.0	7.6	6.5	4.1		1.6	2.7
28 May–5 Jun	Demoskop	**33.5**	26.6	10.9	5.7	3.4	9.6	6.4	3.1		0.8	6.9
8 May–4 Jun	YouGov	**30.5**	25.3	10.2	6.2	4.5	11.5	6.9	3.4		1.5	5.2
13–28 May	Ipsos	**32.1**	28.9	10.3	5.8	3.2	7.0	7.0	4.2		1.5	3.2
2–27 May	SCB	**35.6**	26.9	8.5	6.0	4.2	7.7	6.4	3.6		1.1	8.7
29 Apr–26 May	Novus	**33.5**	27.8	8.1	6.3	3.6	9.2	6.9	3.1		1.5	5.7
22 Apr–19 May	United Minds	**32.7**	26.9	8.5	5.4	2.8	11.0	6.8	4.0		1.8	5.8
6–16 May	Sifo	**32.8**	28.4	10.9	6.4	4.1	6.6	7.0	2.7		1.1	4.4
29 Apr–16 May	SKOP	**34.2**	28.5	9.9	5.8	4.2	6.6	5.4	3.7		1.6	5.7
29 Apr–7 May	Demoskop	**32.9**	29.1	9.2	5.5	3.3	9.9	5.3	2.9		1.8	3.8
3 Apr–7 May	YouGov	**30.9**	27.4	8.2	5.4	4.2	10.9	7.8	3.8		1.4	3.5
4–23 Apr	Ipsos	**33.7**	29.5	8.2	6.6	4.8	6.7	6.0	3.0		1.4	4.2
25 Mar–21 Apr	Novus	**34.4**	27.0	8.6	6.1	3.7	8.9	6.5	4.0		0.8	7.4
18 Mar–21 Apr	United Minds	**31.8**	26.9	9.3	5.9	4.1	10.1	5.8	4.5		1.8	4.9
2–11 Apr	Sifo	**34.4**	27.9	8.9	5.4	3.5	8.0	7.0	3.6		1.3	6.5
26 Mar–11 Apr	SKOP	**32.0**	30.2	8.3	6.6	4.2	7.4	6.3	2.5		2.5	1.8
26 Mar–3 Apr	Demoskop	**32.7**	27.4	9.3	6.9	4.0	9.2	5.9	3.6		1.0	5.3
6 Mar–2 Apr	YouGov	**31.9**	28.4	8.6	5.9	2.7	10.8	5.9	4.3		1.6	3.5
7–26 Mar	Ipsos	**34.6**	28.0	9.2	5.6	3.8	8.0	5.5	4.0		1.1	6.6
25 Feb–24 Mar	Novus	**32.1**	28.3	9.6	6.2	3.3	9.1	6.3	3.7		1.4	3.8
17 Feb–17 Mar	United Minds	**31.6**	25.9	7.9	6.2	4.3	10.3	7.8	4.6		1.3	5.7
4–14 Mar	Sifo	**35.0**	27.3	9.3	5.6	3.8	9.0	5.4	3.3		1.4	7.7
26 Feb–6 Mar	Demoskop	**32.3**	27.8	9.6	5.4	3.0	11.0	6.2	3.4		1.3	4.5
19 Feb–6 Mar	SKOP	**32.9**	29.5	8.2	8.0	4.3	7.3	5.8	3.9		0.1	3.4
6 Feb–5 Mar	YouGov	**30.5**	28.7	9.2	6.5	3.4	12.6	5.7	2.6		0.8	1.8
7–26 Feb	Ipsos	**33.1**	28.1	9.1	5.2	3.8	10.2	5.5	4.2		0.8	4.0
28 Jan–24 Feb	Novus	**31.9**	29.1	9.1	5.2	3.4	10.2	6.6	3.5		1.0	2.8
21 Jan–16 Feb	United Minds	**32.9**	27.6	9.0	4.7	4.0	11.1	6.2	3.3		1.2	5.3
4–14 Feb	Sifo	**31.3**	29.0	11.0	6.2	3.6	8.5	5.7	3.6		1.2	2.3
29 Jan–6 Feb	Demoskop	**31.9**	29.4	8.5	6.5	3.4	9.6	5.8	4.4		0.7	2.5
9 Jan–5 Feb	YouGov	**31.3**	28.8	9.7	5.8	3.3	11.5	5.4	3.5		0.8	2.5
10–29 Jan	Ipsos	29.8	**32.3**	8.6	7.2	3.3	9.0	5.9	3.2		0.8	2.5
2–27 Jan	Novus	**31.5**	29.7	9.3	5.8	4.1	9.4	5.5	3.8		0.9	1.8
17 Dec–20 Jan	United Minds	**31.9**	28.3	8.4	5.8	4.4	10.1	6.9	3.1		1.1	3.6
7–17 Jan	Sifo	**33.6**	29.3	9.0	6.2	3.2	9.1	4.6	4.5		0.4	4.3
2–10 Jan	Demoskop	**32.7**	30.5	7.3	6.4	4.5	9.2	5.9	2.9		0.7	2.2
5 Dec–8 Jan	YouGov	**31.4**	27.4	8.3	4.9	4.5	12.5	6.1	4.5		0.5	4.0
2013
1–18 Dec	SKOP	**31.5**	29.1	10.3	6.2	3.9	7.8	5.3	4.7		1.2	2.4
29 Nov–18 Dec	Ipsos	**33.1**	32.3	8.0	5.7	3.4	8.2	5.3	3.5		0.5	0.8
26 Nov–16 Dec	Novus	**32.2**	28.4	9.0	6.1	5.1	9.0	5.9	3.4		0.9	3.8
12 Nov–16 Dec	United Minds	**32.0**	28.9	8.2	4.9	4.8	9.7	6.7	3.8		1.1	3.1
3–13 Dec	Sifo	**32.1**	28.2	9.7	5.4	4.5	10.0	5.9	3.6		0.7	3.9
27 Nov–5 Dec	Demoskop	32.0	**33.5**	8.3	5.9	2.9	8.6	5.1	2.8		0.9	1.5
7 Nov–4 Dec	YouGov	**31.3**	30.3	7.1	5.7	3.8	10.9	6.7	3.5		0.7	1.0
8–27 Nov	Ipsos	**34.4**	29.7	8.3	5.3	4.4	8.8	4.5	3.2		1.4	4.7
1–25 Nov	SCB	**34.8**	28.1	8.6	5.5	4.4	7.9	5.8	3.8		1.2	6.7
22 Oct–25 Nov	Novus	**32.9**	28.7	9.6	5.4	4.1	8.6	6.6	3.2		0.9	4.2
30 Oct–21 Nov	SKOP	**33.3**	32.2	7.5	4.9	3.6	6.4	6.7	3.2		2.2	1.1
5–15 Nov	Sifo	**33.9**	28.7	10.1	5.3	4.2	8.5	4.7	3.5		1.2	5.2
14 Oct–11 Nov	United Minds	**31.0**	27.8	8.0	6.3	5.1	11.2	5.8	3.9		0.8	3.2
30 Oct–7 Nov	Demoskop	**33.1**	30.3	8.0	5.8	4.5	9.0	4.7	3.7		1.0	2.8
3 Oct–6 Nov	YouGov	**32.8**	30.7	7.0	4.9	4.3	8.2	7.4	4.0		0.7	2.1
3–23 Oct	Ipsos	**34.8**	29.4	7.2	5.3	4.2	8.5	6.3	3.8		0.5	5.4
24 Sep–21 Oct	Novus	**33.8**	31.0	9.1	6.2	3.9	6.5	5.7	3.1		0.7	2.8
16 Sep–13 Oct	United Minds	**31.4**	28.1	8.8	6.1	4.2	9.9	6.4	3.8		1.3	3.3
1–11 Oct	Sifo	**32.1**	28.8	10.0	5.6	4.4	7.7	6.5	3.4		1.4	3.3
25 Sep–3 Oct	Demoskop	**32.6**	31.9	7.7	7.2	3.9	7.1	5.9	2.9		0.8	0.7
5 Sep–2 Oct	YouGov	**31.7**	29.8	8.1	5.2	5.6	9.3	6.5	3.1		0.7	1.9
6–25 Sep	Ipsos	**34.7**	30.6	9.9	6.3	3.7	5.8	4.9	3.2		1.0	4.1
3–24 Sep	SKOP	**33.5**	30.3	9.8	6.5	4.1	6.3	6.0	2.9		0.5	3.2
27 Aug–23 Sep	Novus	**33.9**	31.9	8.9	5.5	4.1	6.1	5.6	3.3		0.7	2.0
20 Aug–16 Sep	United Minds	**33.1**	27.8	8.6	5.8	3.3	8.8	6.9	4.7		1.0	5.3
3–13 Sep	Sifo	**33.3**	28.7	8.9	6.6	4.8	7.2	5.9	3.8		0.8	4.6
28 Aug–5 Sep	Demoskop	**34.8**	28.7	8.9	6.3	5.1	6.3	5.8	3.0		1.0	6.1
8 Aug–4 Sep	YouGov	**33.6**	29.3	8.4	6.4	4.6	7.3	5.3	3.9		1.3	4.3
9–28 Aug	Ipsos	**35.5**	30.9	7.8	5.5	4.9	4.9	6.1	4.0		0.5	4.6
30 Jul–26 Aug	Novus	**34.8**	30.2	9.5	5.7	3.8	5.9	5.8	3.1		1.2	4.6
13–22 Aug	Sifo	**34.3**	28.5	9.9	6.2	4.6	6.2	6.2	3.4		0.7	5.8
23 Jul–19 Aug	United Minds	**34.0**	27.0	8.3	5.9	4.8	8.4	5.9	4.1		1.5	7.0
4 Jul–7 Aug	YouGov	**34.4**	28.2	9.6	5.9	4.8	7.6	5.1	3.6		0.8	6.2
20 Jun–9 Jul	SKOP	**34.2**	31.0	8.2	6.5	4.8	4.7	6.5	3.7		0.5	3.2
26 Jun–4 Jul	Demoskop	**35.4**	30.8	9.1	6.6	3.5	6.0	4.4	3.7		0.7	4.6
6 Jun–3 Jul	YouGov	**35.7**	28.2	8.8	6.5	5.0	6.4	5.4	3.1		1.0	7.5
4–29 Jun	United Minds	**33.6**	27.0	7.6	7.6	4.1	8.3	6.9	3.4		1.5	6.6
28 May–29 Jun	Novus	**33.8**	29.5	9.3	5.6	5.1	5.7	5.8	3.9		1.3	4.3
7–26 Jun	Ipsos	**34.4**	30.7	9.5	5.2	5.7	4.7	5.2	4.2		0.4	3.7
4–14 Jun	Sifo	**38.8**	27.6	8.6	5.6	4.8	5.4	4.4	3.9		0.9	11.2
30 May–6 Jun	Demoskop	**35.7**	30.8	7.7	4.9	4.4	6.6	6.9	2.4		0.7	4.9
14 May–5 Jun	SKOP	**31.9**	31.1	9.8	5.5	5.4	7.0	5.4	2.9		0.9	0.8
9 May–5 Jun	YouGov	**34.5**	29.0	8.1	6.8	4.5	6.5	6.1	3.9		0.6	5.5
7 May–3 Jun	United Minds	**34.6**	27.1	8.2	6.6	3.4	8.7	6.5	3.9		0.9	7.5
10–29 May	Ipsos	**35.8**	30.3	7.8	6.8	4.7	5.9	4.8	3.6		0.4	5.5
2–27 May	SCB	**37.3**	28.6	8.1	5.5	4.7	5.4	5.9	3.7		0.8	8.7
24 Apr–21 May	Novus	**36.6**	28.3	8.2	6.2	4.5	4.6	6.1	4.2		1.3	8.3
2–10 May	Sifo	**36.7**	27.7	9.2	5.3	4.5	6.6	5.3	3.6		1.2	9.0
4 Apr–8 May	YouGov	**34.3**	31.1	8.2	5.4	5.1	6.0	5.9	3.6		0.5	3.2
9 Apr–6 May	United Minds	**34.6**	29.7	8.2	6.7	4.6	6.4	5.6	3.2		1.0	4.9
25 Apr–2 May	Demoskop	**35.5**	30.1	10.2	4.7	4.8	4.6	5.7	3.4		1.1	5.4
4–24 Apr	Ipsos	**34.6**	31.8	8.9	5.3	4.9	5.2	5.4	3.2		0.8	2.8
27 Mar–23 Apr	Novus	**35.9**	29.1	8.2	5.2	5.1	5.3	6.5	3.8		0.9	6.8
27 Mar–19 Apr	SKOP	**34.9**	31.0	8.9	5.7	4.3	6.1	5.3	2.9		1.0	3.9
2–12 Apr	Sifo	**36.8**	29.1	9.3	5.1	4.6	4.7	5.6	4.0		0.8	7.7
12 Mar–8 Apr	United Minds	**35.6**	28.5	9.2	4.8	3.6	7.2	5.7	3.9		1.6	7.1
28 Mar–4 Apr	Demoskop	**34.1**	29.9	9.5	5.2	4.2	6.6	6.5	3.1		0.8	4.2
7 Mar–3 Apr	YouGov	**34.4**	30.5	9.6	5.9	3.7	5.7	6.3	3.5		0.5	3.9
8–27 Mar	Ipsos	**35.6**	29.7	9.3	6.1	5.0	4.2	5.7	3.4		1.1	5.9
21 Feb–19 Mar	Novus	**32.4**	30.5	8.8	5.7	4.8	5.7	7.3	3.6		1.2	1.9
5–15 Mar	Sifo	**33.7**	28.7	10.3	5.9	4.9	5.2	6.1	3.5		1.7	5.0
13 Feb–11 Mar	United Minds	**32.5**	29.3	7.8	5.8	4.7	7.5	7.3	4.6		0.4	3.2
29 Feb–7 Mar	Demoskop	29.7	**32.9**	10.9	5.5	4.9	5.2	6.3	3.6		1.0	3.2
19 Feb–6 Mar	SKOP	30.8	**33.4**	9.1	6.9	5.0	4.5	6.5	3.3		0.6	2.6
1 Feb–6 Mar	YouGov	29.6	**32.1**	9.4	5.6	4.7	5.4	8.3	4.2		0.8	2.5
6–22 Feb	Ipsos	29.3	**32.1**	9.0	6.2	5.0	5.5	7.7	3.9		1.3	2.8
24 Jan–20 Feb	Novus	27.2	**32.5**	10.5	5.5	5.6	5.8	8.2	4.1		0.6	5.3
6–16 Feb	Sifo	29.2	**32.9**	10.5	6.5	5.1	4.7	6.7	3.8		0.8	3.7
27 Jan–12 Feb	United Minds	26.0	**32.7**	10.5	5.0	3.9	7.2	9.2	4.7		0.8	6.7
19 Jan–3 Feb	SKOP	27.3	**32.9**	11.5	5.7	4.9	5.6	7.1	3.7		1.3	5.6
25 Jan–2 Feb	Demoskop	24.8	**32.0**	11.6	6.7	4.3	6.3	9.3	3.8		1.2	7.2
2 Jan–1 Feb	YouGov	21.9	**35.8**	11.7	4.7	4.8	6.9	10.3	3.1		0.9	13.9
9–25 Jan	Ipsos	23.7	**35.7**	10.7	5.8	4.6	5.8	9.6	3.1		1.0	12.0
27 Dec–23 Jan	Novus	22.9	**35.6**	12.1	5.8	5.4	6.0	7.6	3.4		1.2	12.7
9–19 Jan	Sifo	24.6	**32.9**	11.8	5.6	4.5	6.9	8.8	4.2		0.7	8.3
5 Dec–15 Jan	United Minds	23.6	**32.2**	11.5	6.3	6.3	8.3	7.9	2.8		1.1	8.6
16 Dec–12 Jan	SKOP	25.3	**35.6**	11.5	5.8	5.5	5.5	6.1	3.9		0.8	10.3
27 Dec–4 Jan	Demoskop	23.9	**34.1**	14.6	5.8	5.3	6.0	5.9	2.9		1.6	10.2
5 Dec–1 Jan	YouGov	24.7	**34.4**	11.9	6.2	5.0	6.9	6.4	3.6		0.9	9.7
2012
22 Nov–19 Dec	Novus	26.2	**34.8**	11.0	5.6	5.8	5.4	6.4	3.8		1.0	8.6
5–15 Dec	Sifo	25.4	**34.4**	12.3	5.5	5.4	5.2	6.3	4.3		1.1	9.0
1–14 Dec	Ipsos	24.2	**35.7**	12.2	6.5	5.4	5.5	6.3	3.8		0.5	11.5
30 Nov–7 Dec	Demoskop	26.1	**36.3**	11.5	5.9	6.1	5.1	4.2	3.3		1.5	10.2
7 Nov–4 Dec	United Minds	25.7	**31.5**	10.7	7.5	5.5	6.5	6.6	4.3		1.7	5.8
7 Nov–4 Dec	YouGov	24.1	**34.3**	11.2	5.9	4.5	8.9	6.9	3.4		0.8	10.2
1–27 Nov	SCB	27.7	**33.4**	11.7	5.6	5.5	5.7	5.2	3.8		1.4	5.7
7–23 Nov	Ipsos	25.1	**35.9**	12.2	6.3	6.3	5.3	5.3	4.3		0.6	10.8
25 Oct–21 Nov	Novus	27.0	**33.7**	10.1	6.8	5.8	5.3	6.0	4.0		1.2	6.7
28 Oct–20 Nov	SKOP	26.8	**35.4**	11.6	7.0	5.2	4.9	4.2	3.7		1.2	8.6
31 Oct–10 Nov	Sifo	27.4	**32.8**	10.0	6.6	6.7	6.7	5.8	3.2		0.8	5.4
11 Oct–6 Nov	United Minds	24.9	**32.8**	10.6	7.2	4.7	7.7	6.9	3.6		1.6	7.9
3 Oct–6 Nov	YouGov	24.7	**32.9**	10.7	6.5	4.8	8.4	7.1	3.7		1.2	8.2
26 Oct–2 Nov	Demoskop	26.6	**33.4**	12.6	5.1	4.9	6.0	6.7	3.2		1.5	6.8
10–26 Oct	Synovate	28.1	**34.0**	10.0	6.7	5.3	5.1	5.8	4.0		0.7	5.9
21 Sep–17 Oct	Novus	29.5	**32.0**	9.6	5.8	5.7	6.0	5.9	4.5		1.0	2.5
27 Sep–16 Oct	SKOP	31.7	**32.6**	8.7	5.7	7.1	4.8	4.5	4.0		1.1	0.9
3–13 Oct	Sifo	30.3	**31.1**	10.1	6.8	4.9	5.5	6.3	3.8		1.3	0.8
12 Sep–10 Oct	United Minds	**30.0**	29.2	10.2	7.0	6.0	7.1	5.6	3.8		1.1	0.8
28 Sep–5 Oct	Demoskop	28.2	**32.7**	10.5	6.2	5.8	5.9	4.6	4.7		1.3	4.5
5 Sep–2 Oct	YouGov	30.1	**31.8**	10.1	6.4	4.0	7.0	5.8	4.1		0.8	1.7
12–28 Sep	Synovate	**34.1**	31.7	8.3	5.5	5.4	5.1	4.9	3.8		0.5	2.4
23 Aug–20 Sep	Novus	**33.2**	31.6	9.0	6.8	4.9	5.0	4.8	3.7		1.0	1.6
5–15 Sep	Sifo	31.8	**32.7**	8.9	5.8	4.5	5.5	5.4	4.1		1.2	0.9
15 Aug–11 Sep	United Minds	**32.4**	30.9	10.0	6.9	5.3	6.0	3.3	3.9		1.4	1.5
22 Aug–8 Sep	SKOP	30.5	**33.5**	8.7	6.9	5.2	5.1	5.1	4.0		1.1	3.0
31 Aug–7 Sep	Demoskop	31.0	**32.5**	10.4	5.1	5.9	4.8	5.9	3.4		1.0	1.5
2 Aug–4 Sep	YouGov	31.1	**32.7**	9.5	6.4	4.0	7.5	4.5	3.6		0.8	1.6
15–24 Aug	Synovate	32.8	**36.9**	8.4	7.5	3.8	2.9	3.7	3.3		0.6	4.1
26 Jul–22 Aug	Novus	**34.9**	31.5	8.9	6.2	5.2	5.6	3.9	2.9		0.9	3.4
8–18 Aug	Sifo	**32.8**	30.1	10.1	7.4	4.3	6.0	4.3	4.0		1.0	2.7
3 Jul–14 Aug	United Minds	**31.6**	31.0	9.8	6.4	4.4	7.8	5.0	3.2		0.8	0.6
27 Jul–3 Aug	Demoskop	**32.5**	31.6	9.7	5.8	5.4	5.2	6.1	2.6		1.0	0.9
4 Jul–1 Aug	YouGov	30.6	**31.5**	10.6	7.1	3.4	7.7	4.3	3.7		1.1	0.9
29 Jun–6 Jul	Demoskop	32.5	**34.9**	10.6	6.0	3.7	4.6	3.8	3.3		0.5	2.4
17 Jun–3 Jul	SKOP	30.9	**32.9**	10.7	6.6	6.0	4.2	4.7	3.1		0.8	2.0
6 Jun–3 Jul	YouGov	30.6	**32.1**	10.4	5.9	4.7	7.2	4.9	3.1		1.2	1.5
6 Jun–2 Jul	United Minds	30.1	**31.2**	10.1	6.5	4.7	7.4	4.6	4.2		1.3	1.1
7–21 Jun	Synovate	32.0	**32.4**	10.3	7.5	3.7	4.8	3.8	4.5		1.0	0.4
7–16 Jun	Sifo	**35.2**	29.0	9.1	6.2	4.5	6.8	4.5	3.6		1.1	6.2
17 May–13 Jun	Novus	**32.2**	30.8	9.9	6.6	4.8	5.4	5.1	4.5		0.7	1.4
9 May–5 Jun	United Minds	**30.9**	30.5	11.2	6.8	4.0	7.8	4.7	3.1		1.1	0.4
5 May–5 Jun	YouGov	30.1	**31.7**	9.3	7.2	4.5	7.1	5.2	4.1		0.9	1.6
25 May–1 Jun	Demoskop	29.2	**32.1**	11.8	6.5	5.0	6.3	5.2	3.5		0.4	2.9
16–30 May	SKOP	31.7	**33.4**	9.3	5.4	5.5	6.5	4.3	3.8		0.2	1.7
1–26 May	SCB	**34.0**	31.1	8.9	6.0	4.5	5.7	4.5	3.8		1.5	2.9
9–25 May	Synovate	**33.0**	32.7	8.9	7.2	4.7	4.2	4.1	3.8		1.5	0.3
26 Apr–16 May	Novus	**34.1**	30.4	8.5	7.0	5.2	5.5	4.6	3.7		1.0	3.7
2–12 May	Sifo	**33.4**	30.4	8.8	6.6	5.4	6.8	4.6	3.6		0.5	3.0
11 Apr–8 May	United Minds	30.7	**32.2**	8.9	6.5	4.0	7.7	4.9	4.1		0.9	1.5
13 Apr–5 May	SKOP	30.4	**33.4**	9.0	6.0	4.3	5.9	6.1	4.0		0.9	3.0
27 Apr–4 May	Demoskop	30.3	**32.2**	10.5	6.2	4.2	7.1	4.9	3.5		1.2	1.9
4 Apr–1 May	YouGov	30.3	**35.1**	9.9	5.9	3.7	6.6	4.4	3.6		0.8	4.8
11–27 Apr	Synovate	30.6	**33.9**	8.9	6.0	5.0	6.2	4.8	3.6		1.0	3.3
5–18 Apr	Novus	32.1	**32.8**	8.5	6.2	5.1	5.9	4.8	3.4		1.1	0.7
4–14 Apr	Sifo	31.2	**32.5**	9.8	6.0	4.0	6.6	5.4	3.8		0.8	1.3
22 Mar–10 Apr	United Minds	**30.8**	30.3	8.0	7.3	5.6	6.4	4.7	5.1		1.1	0.5
29 Mar–5 Apr	Demoskop	28.8	**36.2**	10.1	6.3	4.2	4.9	4.4	3.6		1.5	7.4
10 Mar–5 Apr	SKOP	30.1	**34.5**	9.0	7.4	3.5	5.2	5.5	2.9		1.8	4.4
7 Mar–4 Apr	YouGov	29.2	**32.8**	9.6	7.1	4.5	8.2	5.3	2.9		0.5	3.6
7–23 Mar	Synovate	29.9	**34.9**	9.7	6.2	5.0	5.7	4.5	3.2		0.9	5.0
12–21 Mar	United Minds	28.0	**33.3**	10.4	6.9	4.3	6.4	5.4	3.3		1.2	5.3
10–21 Mar	Novus	30.5	**31.8**	9.4	7.3	4.8	6.1	4.9	4.5		0.6	1.3
7–17 Mar	Sifo	30.5	**30.9**	9.2	6.7	4.7	6.2	6.0	4.5		1.3	0.4
14 Feb–13 Mar	United Minds	27.8	**33.8**	9.8	7.1	4.8	6.8	4.9	3.8		1.3	6.0
10 Feb–9 Mar	SKOP	29.2	**35.4**	9.5	5.8	4.7	4.8	5.7	3.8		1.3	6.2
7 Feb–6 Mar	YouGov	28.6	**33.9**	10.1	7.8	3.2	6.4	5.3	3.9		0.9	5.3
23 Feb–2 Mar	Demoskop	29.3	**32.4**	10.6	7.3	4.6	5.7	5.2	3.5		1.3	3.1
7–23 Feb	Synovate	29.0	**36.7**	8.0	7.7	3.6	4.6	5.3	3.9		1.2	7.7
8–21 Feb	Novus	28.4	**33.6**	8.7	7.4	5.1	6.5	5.0	4.1		1.2	5.2
7–17 Feb	Sifo	30.2	**33.4**	7.7	6.5	5.1	6.4	5.4	4.3		1.2	3.2
17 Jan–13 Feb	United Minds	25.6	**31.8**	11.4	7.2	4.4	8.5	5.1	4.6		1.4	6.2
3 Jan–6 Feb	YouGov	25.2	**32.2**	9.7	6.4	5.4	7.9	5.7	4.6		2.8	7.0
26 Jan–2 Feb	Demoskop	30.1	**36.8**	9.3	5.9	4.0	5.1	4.5	2.7		1.5	6.7
10–26 Jan	Synovate	27.0	**34.6**	11.1	6.5	4.7	6.3	5.2	3.6		1.1	7.6
10–20 Jan	Sifo	27.8	**33.9**	10.3	7.1	4.7	6.9	4.3	4.4		0.6	6.1
4–17 Jan	Novus	28.0	**34.5**	8.6	6.9	4.7	5.9	5.5	4.5		1.4	6.5
20 Dec–16 Jan	United Minds	26.6	**35.1**	9.8	6.2	4.1	7.0	5.9	3.8		1.4	8.5
15 Dec–12 Jan	SKOP	24.4	**35.7**	9.6	8.1	5.5	7.1	5.2	2.7		1.7	11.3
29 Dec–5 Jan	Demoskop	27.8	**36.1**	9.6	6.6	4.1	5.7	5.2	3.7		1.1	8.3
2011
23 Nov–19 Dec	United Minds	27.6	**31.7**	9.4	7.5	5.5	6.9	5.2	4.8		1.4	4.1
6–16 Dec	Sifo	26.9	**34.2**	10.1	6.8	4.8	7.2	4.9	3.5		1.8	7.3
28 Nov–16 Dec	SKOP	28.2	**35.1**	11.0	7.2	3.8	6.3	5.0	2.8		0.8	6.9
29 Nov–15 Dec	Synovate	26.7	**36.3**	10.4	7.3	5.8	4.6	5.1	3.2		0.7	9.6
30 Nov–13 Dec	Novus	28.7	**33.4**	9.5	7.3	5.5	6.5	5.3	2.9		0.9	4.7
24 Nov–1 Dec	Demoskop	28.2	**34.8**	8.9	6.1	5.0	5.6	6.1	3.4		1.8	6.6
31 Oct–25 Nov	SCB	29.0	**32.4**	8.8	6.8	5.8	6.7	4.7	4.3		1.5	3.4
8–24 Nov	Synovate	27.7	**37.5**	9.1	6.2	5.2	4.3	5.3	3.8		0.8	9.8
25 Oct–21 Nov	United Minds	29.1	**31.0**	8.5	7.0	6.3	6.0	5.8	4.9		1.3	1.9
2–15 Nov	Novus	29.9	**33.6**	8.2	7.0	4.6	6.3	5.0	4.4		1.1	3.7
1–11 Nov	Sifo	28.5	**31.8**	8.5	7.8	5.1	6.9	5.8	4.1		1.6	3.3
17 Oct–8 Nov	SKOP	31.3	**32.5**	9.1	7.0	5.0	6.2	4.3	2.8		1.9	1.2
27 Oct–3 Nov	Demoskop	28.9	**34.3**	9.1	8.2	4.8	4.9	5.0	4.4		0.5	5.4
11–27 Oct	Synovate	28.4	**35.2**	9.4	7.8	5.3	4.6	4.2	3.8		1.4	6.8
25 Sep–24 Oct	United Minds	29.6	**30.6**	7.5	7.4	6.6	5.9	5.9	5.1		1.3	1.0
5–18 Oct	Novus	30.4	**32.0**	8.1	7.9	4.9	6.4	4.4	4.8		1.1	1.6
4–14 Oct	Sifo	29.5	**32.4**	8.7	7.0	5.0	6.4	5.3	4.2		1.6	2.9
29 Sep–6 Oct	Demoskop	29.0	**32.7**	9.6	7.4	6.1	3.4	5.4	5.0		1.4	3.7
22–30 Sep	Synovate	29.6	**31.7**	8.9	7.8	5.4	4.7	5.1	4.4		2.3	2.1
**19 Sep 2010**	**General Election**	**30.7**	**30.1**	**7.3**	**7.1**	**6.6**	**5.7**	**5.6**	**5.6**	**0.4**	**0.9**	**0.6**

== See also ==
- Opinion polling for the 2018 Swedish general election
