= Opinion polling for the 2022 Swedish general election =

← 2018	11 September 2022	2026 →

In the run up for the 2022 Swedish general election to the Riksdag, various organisations carry out opinion polling to gauge voting intention in Sweden. Results of such polls are displayed in this article.

The date range for these opinion polls are from the 2018 Swedish general election, held on 9 September, to the present day. The next election took place on 11 September 2022.

== Opinion polls ==
=== Vote share ===
Polling firm	Fieldwork date	Sample size	V	S	MP	C	L	M	KD	SD	Oth.	Lead
2022 election results	11 Sep 2022	–	6.8	30.3	5.1	6.7	4.6	19.1	5.3	20.5	1.5	9.8
Sifo	9 Sep 2022	–	7.9	29.0	6.4	6.6	6.0	16.2	6.1	20.7	1.1	8.3
Sifo	5-7 Sep 2022	2,414	7.4	29.5	6.2	7.0	5.8	17.1	6.1	20.2	0.7	9.3
Novus	4-6 Sep 2022	1,500	8.0	27.8	5.7	8.6	4.8	17.3	5.9	20.6	1.3	7.2
Sifo	4-6 Sep 2022	2,230	7.0	30.1	5.8	7.1	5.0	17.0	6.2	21.0	0.8	9.1
SKOP	3-7 Sep 2022	1,387	8.6	26.4	7.9	6.5	6.8	16.2	6.9	19.8	0.9	6.6
SKOP	3-6 Sep 2022	1,406	7.7	27.9	7.5	7.0	5.4	17.7	6.3	19.7	0.8	8.2
Novus	3-5 Sep 2022	1,500	7.5	28.7	5.6	8.8	4.4	17.9	6.1	19.9	1.1	8.8
SKOP	2-5 Sep 2022	1,122	7.7	27.7	8.1	7.4	5.5	18.6	6.0	18.1	0.9	9.1
Sifo	2-4 Sep 2022	1,999	6.9	30.0	5.7	7.7	4.7	18.6	5.5	20.0	0.9	10.0
Novus	2-4 Sep 2022	1,500	8.0	28.9	5.5	8.8	4.2	17.4	6.6	20.0	0.6	8.9
Sifo	2-4 Sep 2022	1,942	7.5	29.4	5.1	8.2	5.1	17.6	6.2	19.6	1.3	9.8
Ipsos	1-6 Sep 2022	1,730	8.4	28.4	5.3	7.6	4.2	18.2	6.2	20.4	1.3	8.0
SKOP	1-4 Sep 2022	1,154	7.2	30.0	7.8	7.5	4.8	17.6	5.9	18.8	0.4	11.2
Sifo	1-3 Sep 2022	1,883	7.7	28.5	4.8	7.6	5.9	18.1	6.2	19.4	1.8	9.1
Novus	1-3 Sep 2022	1,500	8.2	29.8	4.8	7.5	4.3	18.1	6.8	19.8	0.7	10.0
Infostat	31 Aug-7 Sep 2022	–	7.8	28.7	4.8	7.5	4.9	18.0	5.9	20.6	1.8	8.1
Demoskop	31 Aug-4 Sep 2022	2,163	8.3	29.2	4.3	8.1	5.3	18.3	5.3	20.5	0.7	8.7
SKOP	31 Aug-3 Sep 2022	1,161	7.3	31.1	7.6	8.3	5.4	16.6	5.4	18.0	0.3	13.1
Sifo	31 Aug-2 Sep 2022	1,889	7.4	28.5	4.8	7.8	5.8	17.3	6.6	20.1	1.8	8.4
Novus	31 Aug-2 Sep 2022	1,500	8.5	28.7	4.9	7.0	4.4	17.6	7.1	21.0	0.8	7.7
SKOP	30 Aug-2 Sep 2022	1,228	8.1	30.9	6.6	8.1	5.5	16.2	5.1	18.8	0.7	12.1
Novus	30 Aug-1 Sep 2022	1,500	8.8	26.5	5.4	6.7	5.1	18.7	7.1	20.9	0.8	5.6
Sifo	30 Aug-1 Sep 2022	1,706	7.6	29.0	4.9	7.5	6.2	16.8	6.3	20.0	1.7	9.0
SKOP	29 Aug-1 Sep 2022	1,192	8.8	30.4	5.7	8.0	7.4	14.8	5.6	18.4	0.9	12.0
Novus	29-31 Aug 2022	1,500	8.4	26.6	5.9	6.8	5.3	18.9	7.2	20.0	0.9	6.6
Sifo	29-31 Aug 2022	1,967	8.0	29.7	4.8	7.3	6.2	16.1	5.7	20.6	1.6	9.1
SKOP	27-31 Aug 2022	1,180	8.1	28.7	5.8	8.3	6.7	16.0	6.1	18.8	1.5	9.9
Ipsos	26-30 Aug 2022	–	8.7	28.3	5.7	6.1	4.8	16.8	6.1	22.2	1.3	6.1
Sifo	28-30 Aug 2022	2,002	8.2	31.1	4.7	6.4	6.8	15.9	5.7	19.6	1.6	11.5
Novus	28-30 Aug 2022	1,500	7.8	28.1	5.9	7.3	5.6	18.3	6.6	19.5	0.9	8.6
SKOP	27-30 Aug 2022	1,194	7.2	27.6	5.9	6.7	7.0	18.3	6.6	19.6	1.3	8.0
Sifo	27-29 Aug 2022	2,002	7.9	30.4	5.2	6.6	6.4	16.4	5.3	20.9	0.9	9.5
Novus	27-29 Aug 2022	1,500	7.5	29.8	5.6	7.7	5.2	15.6	6.4	20.9	1.3	8.9
Sentio	25-29 Aug 2022	–	9.6	24.1	4.4	5.8	4.0	18.7	6.9	24.4	2.1	0.3
SKOP	25-29 Aug 2022	1,071	8.7	26.9	5.9	7.2	6.5	18.2	6.6	18.8	1.2	8.1
Demoskop	21-29 Aug 2022	2,216	7.8	29.6	5.3	7.5	4.6	18.0	5.4	20.6	1.2	9.0
Sifo	26-28 Aug 2022	1,821	7.7	30.9	5.3	6.4	5.8	18.5	5.0	19.4	1.0	11.5
Novus	26-28 Aug 2022	1,500	7.9	30.3	5.0	8.0	4.5	15.8	6.4	20.6	1.5	9.7
SKOP	24-28 Aug 2022	1,349	8.7	27.2	5.3	8.2	6.1	18.5	6.7	18.6	0.7	8.6
Sifo	25-27 Aug 2022	1,932	7.1	31.2	5.2	6.1	5.4	18.1	5.8	19.5	1.6	11.7
Novus	25-27 Aug 2022	–	8.6	30.2	4.4	7.4	4.5	16.2	5.9	21.1	1.7	9.1
SKOP	23-27 Aug 2022	1,054	8.6	28.5	5.2	7.7	6.3	18.4	6.3	18.3	0.7	10.1
Novus	24-26 Aug 2022	1,500	9.1	29.0	4.3	5.4	4.7	17.4	6.2	22.4	1.5	6.6
Sifo	24-26 Aug 2022	1,964	6.8	31.8	5.3	5.7	5.4	17.9	5.9	19.4	1.8	12.4
SKOP	22-26 Aug 2022	1,355	9.4	27.9	5.5	7.9	5.7	18.7	5.3	18.6	1.0	9.2
Sifo	23-25 Aug 2022	2,197	7.3	31.2	5.7	5.8	5.2	17.5	5.8	19.8	1.7	11.4
Novus	23-25 Aug 2022	1,500	8.4	27.9	4.8	5.6	5.5	17.8	6.1	22.8	1.1	5.1
SKOP	21-25 Aug 2022	1,388	9.3	28.5	4.9	7.0	6.1	18.3	6.2	18.6	1.1	9.9
Novus	22-24 Aug 2022	1,500	8.5	27.5	4.7	6.5	6.0	17.9	5.5	22.4	1.0	5.1
Sifo	22-24 Aug 2022	2,361	7.6	30.5	5.3	5.7	4.6	18.3	5.6	20.3	2.1	10.2
SKOP	20-24 Aug 2022	1,118	9.6	28.0	5.5	6.1	6.3	18.0	6.3	18.8	1.4	9.2
Ipsos	16-24 Aug 2022	1,630	8.5	30.4	5.0	6.9	4.6	16.6	5.5	20.7	1.8	9.7
Novus	21-23 Aug 2022	1,500	8.5	28.2	4.8	6.9	6.1	17.5	5.1	22.0	0.9	6.2
Sifo	21-23 Aug 2022	2,474	7.9	30.2	4.7	6.0	4.8	18.6	6.3	19.2	2.3	11.0
SKOP	19-23 Aug 2022	1,125	8.1	28.9	5.8	6.6	7.1	18.8	4.9	18.0	1.8	10.1
Novus	20-22 Aug 2022	1,500	9.5	28.5	4.9	7.2	4.9	17.4	5.2	21.4	1.0	7.1
Sifo	20-22 Aug 2022	2,194	7.2	30.2	5.5	6.1	5.4	17.4	6.7	19.0	2.5	11.2
SKOP	18-22 Aug 2022	–	8.5	27.8	5.9	8.6	6.3	17.5	4.9	19.3	1.3	8.5
Sifo	19-21 Aug 2022	1,925	8.1	31.2	5.4	5.8	5.8	17.7	6.2	18.1	1.7	13.1
Novus	19-21 Aug 2022	1,681	9.6	27.8	5.5	6.7	4.4	17.4	6.0	21.5	1.1	6.3
Demoskop	16-21 Aug 2022	2,222	8.9	28.9	4.8	6.8	4.2	19.9	6.4	18.7	1.4	9.0
Sifo	16-18 Aug 2022	1,681	8.0	32.7	5.3	6.1	5.6	17.6	6.0	16.1	2.6	15.1
Sifo	15–17 Aug 2022	–	8.0	31.2	5.5	6.0	5.9	18.2	5.6	17.1	2.5	13
Demoskop	6–16 Aug 2022	–	7.4	29.6	5.2	7.5	4.9	19.9	5.8	18.4	1.3	9.7
Sifo	13–15 Aug 2022	–	7.5	30.0	5.6	5.9	5.5	19.5	6.2	17.6	2.2	10.5
Sifo	12-14 Aug 2022	–	8.0	29.9	5.6	5.7	5.5	19.2	6.5	16.9	2.7	10.7
Novus	8-14 Aug 2022	–	9.7	28.5	4.5	6.0	5.8	19.6	5.6	18.8	1.5	8.9
Sifo	9–11 Aug 2022	–	7.6	31.2	4.6	5.3	5.7	20.7	6.1	16.5	2.3	10.5
Novus	1–7 Aug 2022	1,893	7.2	30.6	5.2	6.8	5.1	18.6	6.3	18.6	1.6	12.0
Demoskop	24 Jul–2 Aug 2022	2,247	7.7	28.7	4.8	7.2	5.7	20.3	6.9	17.7	1.0	8.4
SKOP	8–11 Jul 2022	1,009	10.3	31.5	3.6	6.2	6.1	18.5	5.7	16.6	1.5	13
Demoskop	22–30 Jun 2022	2,125	8.4	30.3	4.9	7.1	4.7	21.0	6.1	16.3	1.2	9.3
Novus	6–26 Jun 2022	2,838	8.8	31.7	3.5	5.4	5.0	19.6	6.7	17.4	1.9	12.1
Sentio	16–21 Jun 2022	–	9.0	28.2	3.1	6.4	3.9	20.9	5.5	21.1	1.9	7.1
Ipsos	7–19 Jun 2022	1,635	9.3	30.6	2.9	5.2	5.1	19.5	6.0	19.4	2.0	11
Sifo	6–16 Jun 2022	8,996	7.9	33.7	3.4	6.0	4.4	19.3	6.3	17.4	2.1	14.4
Demoskop	31 May – 9 Jun 2022	2,125	7.6	30.9	3.9	7.7	4.2	22.1	5.7	16.9	1.0	8.8
Novus	9 May – 5 Jun 2022	3,804	9.4	30.2	3.3	5.9	3.5	21.5	6.3	18.0	1.9	8.7
Sentio	19–23 May 2022	–	7.8	29.2	4.1	5.3	2.6	20.4	8.5	19.4	2.7	8.8
Ipsos	10–22 May 2022	1,569	8.8	32.0	3.2	5.1	3.1	21.7	5.3	18.4	2.2	10
Sifo	2–12 May 2022	6,890	8.2	32.6	2.7	6.3	3.6	20.8	5.6	18.1	2.1	11.8
Infostat	4–10 May 2022	1,690	8.2	27.7	3.7	5.9	3.5	21.3	6.0	21.0	2.7	6.4
Demoskop	26 April – 4 May 2022	2,154	7.3	31.2	3.0	7.9	2.9	22.9	6.4	16.9	1.5	8.3
Novus	4 Apr – 1 May 2022	3,541	9.0	31.8	3.3	6.9	2.5	21.0	5.9	17.9	1.7	10.8
Ipsos	12–26 Apr 2022	1,570	9.4	30.2	3.5	6.1	2.8	21.8	6.3	17.6	2.4	6.4
Sentio	21–25 Apr 2022	–	8.9	28.3	3.1	5.1	2.9	22.3	5.5	21.1	2.8	6.0
Demoskop	29 Mar–5 Apr 2022	2,446	8.1	31.5	3.5	8.0	2.4	22.9	5.4	17.0	1.2	8.6
Novus	7 Mar–3 Apr 2022	3,983	8.3	32.0	3.3	6.8	2.1	21.5	5.7	18.7	1.6	10.5
Sifo	7–17 Mar 2022	6,960	8.6	32.8	2.7	7.0	2.4	21.4	4.9	18.6	1.5	11.4
Infostat	Mar 2022	–	8.9	31.6	2.4	5.7	2.6	21.9	5.3	18.0	3.6	11.8
Demoskop	1–9 Mar 2022	2,175	7.4	32.4	2.9	7.5	2.2	22.0	6.5	17.5	1.6	10.3
Sentio	24 Feb – 2 Mar 2022	1,026	9.5	29.2	2.8	5.8	2.5	21.4	7.1	19.4	2.0	7.8
Novus	31 Jan–27 Feb 2022	3,825	8.9	32.0	3.2	6.8	2.1	21.2	5.1	19.4	1.4	10.8
Ipsos	8–20 Feb 2022	1,617	10	29	3	7	3	21	5	20	2	8
Sifo	7–17 Feb 2022	6,103	10.1	29.6	3.6	6.9	2.7	20.9	5.3	19.3	1.8	8.7
SKOP	11–14 Feb 2022	1,013	11.8	31.4	3.1	7.3	2.7	19.1	4.2	19.0	1.4	12.3
Demoskop	1–8 Feb 2022	2,505	10.0	28.2	2.8	7.9	3.2	22.0	5.6	19.2	1.1	6.2
Sentio	Jan 2022	–	8.7	29.4	3.6	6.8	2.9	21.1	5.5	20.2	1.8	8.3
Novus	3–30 Jan 2022	3,702	9.8	29.3	3.5	7.4	2.7	20.5	5.4	19.8	1.6	8.8
Ipsos	11–24 Jan 2022	1,660	10	31	3	6	4	21	6	18	1	10
Sifo	10–20 Jan 2022	6,692	9.6	31.1	3.0	7.0	2.9	20.9	4.4	19.2	1.9	10.2
Demoskop	28 Dec 2021–5 Jan 2022	2,440	9.3	29.2	2.8	8.3	3.2	21.8	5.4	17.8	2.2	7.4
Novus	6 Dec 2021–2 Jan 2022	2,017	10.5	31.3	3.4	6.7	2.2	18.7	5.6	20.1	1.6	11.2
Sentio	Dec 2021	–	8.5	28.2	4.3	6.8	2.9	20.9	5.9	20.0	2.6	7.3
Ipsos	7–20 Dec 2021	1,581	10	29	4	7	3	20	5	20	–	9
Sifo	6–16 Dec 2021	6,157	9.7	31.1	3.2	7.0	2.8	20.0	5.1	19.7	1.4	11.1
Demoskop	30 Nov–8 Dec 2021	2,446	8.2	29.1	3.3	8.5	2.0	22.6	6.0	18.7	1.7	6.5
Novus	8 Nov–5 Dec 2021	4,233	10.1	29.3	3.7	7.5	2.9	21.2	4.7	19.0	1.6	8.1
Sentio	17–25 Nov 2021	–	11.7	25.5	3.7	6.9	3.3	19.9	5.4	20.6	3.0	4.9
SCB	28 Oct–25 Nov 2021	9,190	9.2	29.1	3.9	8.4	2.5	22.7	4.6	18.6	1.1	6.4
Ipsos	9-22 Nov 2021	1,605	11	25	4	8	3	21	6	20	1	4
Sifo	8-18 Nov 2021	5,710	9.3	28.9	3.6	8.1	2.3	21.0	4.6	20.3	1.8	7.9
Demoskop	5–11 Nov 2021	2,359	8.1	27.0	3.4	9.7	3.2	23.6	5.3	18.7	1.0	3.4
Novus	4–31 Oct 2021	3,660	11.3	25.6	4.8	8.5	2.8	22.9	4.1	19.1	0.9	2.7
Sentio	21–25 Oct 2021	–	11.9	21.1	3.5	5.3	2.2	22.7	6.0	23.9	2.4 (Note: FI: 0.6 AfS: 0.6 MED: 0.3 PP: 0.6)	1.2
Ipsos	12–25 Oct 2021	1,572	11	26	5	8	4	20	4	20	1	6
SKOP	15–17 Oct 2021	1,011	11.5	24.3	4.4	9.5	3.1	22.1	3.7	19.9	1.5	2.2
Sifo	4–14 Oct 2021	6,152	10.5	26.6	3.7	8.0	2.8	21.9	5.0	19.9	1.6	4.7
Demoskop	29 Sep–6 Oct 2021	2,417	8.6	26.7	3.0	9.5	2.7	22.2	5.5	20.9	0.8	4.5
Novus	30 Aug–3 Oct 2021	4,922	10.6	26.0	4.0	8.8	2.6	22.6	4.6	19.4	1.4	3.4
Sentio	23–27 Sep 2021	–	10.4	24.4	3.9	5.3	3.0	22.7	5.9	21.7	– (Note: FI: 0.9 AfS: 0.8 MED: 0.1 PP: 0.7)	1.7
Ipsos	14–26 Sep 2021	1,533	11	25	4	8	3	22	4	21	–	3
Sifo	6–16 Sep 2021	6,488	10.6	26.1	4.2	8.9	3.0	21.5	4.7	19.6	1.4	4.6
SKOP	3–11 Sep 2021	1,030	12.5	25.8	3.4	9.6	2.4	21.6	5.0	18.5	1.2	4.2
Demoskop	31 Aug–8 Sep 2021	2,199	8.2	26.7	3.5	9.7	2.5	22.1	5.6	20.7	0.9	4.6
Sentio	26–29 Aug 2021	–	10.6	23.1	4.0	5.8	1.9	21.0	7.8	23.3	– (Note: FI: 0.2 AfS: 0.7 MED: 0.8 PP: 0.4)	0.2
Novus	2–29 Aug 2021	4,765	11.2	25.9	4.4	8.9	2.1	22.0	4.5	19.6	1.4	3.9
Ipsos	10–23 Aug 2021	1,547	11	25	5	8	3	21	4	20	2	4
Sifo	9–18 Aug 2021	4,972	11.9	24.1	4.2	8.6	2.7	21.8	4.9	20.5	1.3	2.3
Demoskop	2–5 Aug 2021	2,403	10.2	24.6	3.5	10.1	2.3	23.2	5.4	19.9	0.8	1.4
Novus	19–26 Jul 2021	4,863	13.3	23.8	3.8	8.9	2.2	21.0	4.5	21.6	–	2.2
SKOP	19–23 Jul 2021	1,013	12.0	27.2	3.7	8.7	2.9	21.8	3.5	19.5	0.8	5.4
Sentio	16–19 Jul 2021	–	10.8	23.6	5.0	6.8	4.1	18.9	5.1	23.9	– (Note: FI: 0.2 AfS: 0.4 MED: 0.6 PP: 0.2)	0.3
Demoskop	29 Jun–7 Jul 2021	3,267	9.4	25.2	3.5	10.4	3.5	21.7	6.1	19.3	0.9	3.5
Sentio	2–5 Jul 2021	–	10.3	23.8	4.3	6.3	4.3	21.0	6.1	21.9	– (Note: FI: 0.3 AfS: 0.5 MED: 0.0 PP: 0.7)	1.9
Demoskop	23–28 Jun 2021	2,148	11.3	23.4	3.3	10.6	3.4	22.1	6.8	18.2	0.9	1.3
Novus	21–27 Jun 2021	2,408	11.5	25.5	3.5	7.9	2.5	21.8	5.0	21.4	1.3	3.7
Sentio	18–21 Jun 2021	–	10.2	25.2	3.3	7.9	2.8	21.2	6.8	19.4	– (Note: FI: 0.7 AfS: 0.7 MED: 0.3 PP: 0.3)	4.0
Ipsos	8–20 Jun 2021	1,547	12	24	3	10	2	22	6	19	–	2
Sifo	7–17 Jun 2021	6,539	9.6	25.8	3.5	9.9	2.3	22.4	5.1	20.2	1.2	3.4
Novus	3 May–6 Jun 2021	4,925	9.6	26.1	4.2	9.4	2.3	22.6	5.3	19.2	1.3	3.5
Demoskop	26 May–2 Jun 2021	2,730	8.5	24.2	3.5	10.7	3.6	22.9	5.6	19.2	2.0	1.3
SCB	28 Apr–27 May 2021	9,216	8.9	28.2	3.8	9.5	2.5	22.4	4.5	18.9	1.4	5.8
Sentio	21–24 May 2021	–	10.3	25.5	5.0	7.0	3.3	19.3	5.2	21.0	– (Note: FI: 0.8 AfS: 0.7 MED: 0.7 PP: 0.2)	4.5
Ipsos	11–23 May 2021	1,548	10	26	4	9	3	22	5	20	2	4
Sifo	3–13 May 2021	8,964	9.6	26.9	4.0	9.3	2.9	21.7	5.2	18.8	1.6	5.2
Demoskop	28 Apr–5 May 2021	2,651	6.9	25.4	4.1	11.8	3.2	23.1	5.2	19.0	1.3	2.3
Novus	5 Apr–2 May 2021	3,654	9.5	27.5	4.0	8.4	2.9	22.9	5.3	18.1	1.1	4.6
Sentio	23–26 Apr 2021	–	10.2	25.4	4.6	6.7	2.5	21.2	5.6	21.4	– (Note: FI: 0.5 AfS: 0.8 MED: 0.2 PP: 0.2)	4.0
Ipsos	13–25 Apr 2021	2,055	10	26	4	9	3	22	5	19	2	4
Sifo	5–15 Apr 2021	6,796	9.4	27.8	4.3	8.9	3.1	21.3	4.8	18.9	1.6	6.5
Demoskop	30 Mar–7 Apr 2021	2,651	8.4	25.4	3.3	9.8	3.7	22.8	5.2	19.2	2.2	2.6
Novus	1 Mar–4 Apr 2021	4,989	9.5	27.6	4.5	8.4	2.9	22.6	4.2	18.7	1.6	5.0
Sentio	26–29 Mar 2021	–	8.9	26.5	5.0	6.0	3.0	20.1	5.9	22.2	2.4 (Note: FI: 0.7 AfS: 0.5 MED: 0.4 PP: 0.6)	4.3
Ipsos	9–21 Mar 2021	1,540	11	27	4	9	3	22	4	20	1	5
Sifo	1–11 Mar 2021	7,711	9.7	27.2	4.2	8.8	2.9	22.9	4.4	18.4	1.5	4.3
Demoskop	26 Feb–3 Mar 2021	2,314	9.3	24.2	3.1	9.9	2.7	24.5	5.8	18.2	2.2	0.3
Sentio	25–28 Feb 2021	–	10.1	25.4	3.3	7.3	3.1	21.7	6.0	20.7	– (Note: FI: 0.4 AfS: 0.8 MED: 0.3 PP: 0.5)	3.7
Novus	1–28 Feb 2021	3,761	9.5	27.0	4.4	8.3	3.3	24.0	4.1	17.9	1.5	3.0
SKOP	19–23 Feb 2021	1,000	10.2	27.4	4.0	10.0	2.4	24.5	4.6	15.5	1.4	2.9
Ipsos	9–21 Feb 2021	1,522	9	27	4	9	3	23	5	19	2	4
Sifo	1–11 Feb 2021	6,704	10.0	27.6	3.6	8.1	2.8	23.5	4.3	18.8	1.3	4.1
Demoskop	26 Jan–3 Feb 2021	2,184	9.4	24.7	3.5	9.6	3.1	23.2	6.5	18.3	1.7	1.5
Sentio	28–31 Jan 2021	1,000	10.7	26.3	3.6	5.8	2.2	20.7	5.2	23.3	2.2 (Note: FI: 0.2 AfS: 0.6 MED: 0.4 PP: 0.3)	3.0
Novus	11–31 Jan 2021	2,887	10.8	26.9	4.1	8.5	2.7	23.1	4.7	18.1	–	3.8
Ipsos	13–25 Jan 2021	1,531	10	27	4	8	3	22	5	19	2	5
Sifo	11–21 Jan 2021	6,947	10.0	27.6	3.7	8.1	3.2	22.4	4.9	18.6	1.6	5.2
Demoskop	29 Dec 2020–11 Jan 2021	2,095	9.9	23.0	5.0	9.2	2.3	23.2	5.9	19.5	2.1	0.2
Novus	7 Dec 2020–10 Jan 2021	2,715	9.5	28.5	4.0	8.3	2.6	21.8	4.6	19.4	1.3	6.7
Sentio	11–14 Dec 2020	–	11.3	24.1	3.2	6.0	2.6	22.1	4.8	23.2	2.4 (Note: FI: 0.4 AfS: 0.6 MED: 0.4 PP: 0.2)	0.9
Ipsos	1–13 Dec 2020	1,531	11	26	5	7	3	23	5	20	1	3
Sifo	30 Nov–10 Dec 2020	7,349	10.3	27.8	3.7	7.7	3.0	21.7	5.4	18.9	1.6	6.1
Novus	9 Nov–6 Dec 2020	3,813	9.7	28.0	4.1	8.2	2.7	21.7	5.4	18.5	1.7	6.3
SKOP	30 Nov–3 Dec 2020	1,004	11.2	26.1	4.0	8.5	2.7	21.8	6.5	18.2	1.0	4.3
Demoskop	26 Nov–2 Dec 2020	2,278	9.3	25.0	3.6	9.4	2.8	23.2	5.7	19.6	1.4	1.8
SCB	2–26 Nov 2020	4,692	9.3	29.4	4.2	7.6	3.0	22.1	5.4	17.6	1.5	7.3
Ipsos	10–22 Nov 2020	–	11	26	4	9	3	21	5	20	1	5
Sentio	12–16 Nov 2020	–	9.9	23.3	3.3	5.8	3.3	19.8	5.9	25.2	3.4 (Note: FI: 0.5 AfS: 1.0 MED: 0.9 PP: 0.5)	1.9
Sifo	2–12 Nov 2020	6,825	10.2	27.0	4.2	7.6	3.2	20.8	5.7	19.9	1.4	6.2
Novus	12 Oct–8 Nov 2020	3,783	10.6	26.4	3.9	8.6	2.7	22.0	5.0	19.4	1.4	4.4
Demoskop	27 Oct–4 Nov 2020	2,200	9.4	24.0	3.4	9.2	3.1	22.4	6.9	19.9	1.8	1.6
SKOP	23–26 Oct 2020	1,000	12.1	26.0	3.1	9.1	3.3	21.1	5.9	17.8	1.5	4.9
Ipsos	13–25 Oct 2020	–	11	25	5	9	3	21	6	20	–	4
Sentio	15–18 Oct 2020	–	9.7	24.8	4.6	6.5	2.8	18.8	5.9	24.1	2.7 (Note: FI: 0.6 AfS: 1.1 MED: 0.2 PP: 0.3)	0.7
Sifo	5–15 Oct 2020	7,299	10.0	26.4	4.3	7.7	3.2	20.6	5.9	20.2	1.7	5.8
Novus	14 Sep–11 Oct 2020	3,878	9.6	26.5	5.2	8.4	3.4	20.7	5.7	19.2	1.3	5.8
Demoskop	1–7 Oct 2020	2,722	9.2	25.0	3.5	9.4	3.4	21.1	6.7	19.9	1.8	3.9
Ipsos	8–21 Sep 2020	1,521	9	26	4	8	4	20	7	20	–	6
Sentio	17–20 Sep 2020	–	8.6	25.1	3.9	7.5	3.0	19.7	7.1	22.4	– (Note: FI: 0.4 AfS: 0.6 MED: 0.4 PP: 0.6)	2.7
Sifo	7–17 Sep 2020	5,029	8.9	27.5	3.8	8.2	3.5	20.6	6.2	19.8	1.5	6.9
Novus	24 Aug–13 Sep 2020	3,082	9.4	27.0	4.3	7.8	3.2	21.2	5.7	19.6	1.8	5.8
Demoskop	25 Aug–1 Sep 2020	2,366	7.5	26.1	3.2	9.2	3.1	22.2	5.3	21.6	1.8	3.9
Sentio	20–25 Aug 2020	–	10.0	26.7	5.0	5.1	2.8	20.3	5.4	22.4	2.3 (Note: FI: 0.4 AfS: 0.9 MED: 0.5 PP: 0.1)	4.3
Ipsos	11–23 Aug 2020	–	10	27	4	7	3	20	6	21	–	6
Novus	3–23 Aug 2020	3,804	9.3	28.3	3.8	7.6	2.9	21.2	5.8	19.4	1.7	7.1
Sifo	10–20 Aug 2020	5,640	9.2	27.8	3.6	7.8	4.2	20.3	6.4	19.7	1.1	7.5
Demoskop	28 Jul–4 Aug 2020	2,705	6.8	27.3	3.4	8.8	3.3	21.6	5.6	20.5	2.7	5.7
SKOP	23–28 Jul 2020	1,010	10.4	28.2	3.4	8.0	3.7	21.1	5.9	17.9	1.3	7.1
Sentio	10–12 Jul 2020	–	8.5	25.5	5.1	5.8	2.5	20.3	5.7	24.1	2.5 (Note: FI: 0.1 AfS: 1.1 MED: 0.7 PP: 0.3)	1.4
Demoskop	30 Jun–7 Jul 2020	2,226	7.8	28.5	4.1	8.4	3.2	20.8	5.7	19.7	1.9	7.7
Novus	25 May–21 Jun 2020	3,811	9.4	30.6	3.4	7.8	3.0	20.7	5.7	18.4	1.0	9.9
Sentio	12–15 Jun 2020	–	9.7	28.8	3.9	6.4	2.9	18.6	5.9	20.7	3.1 (Note: FI: 0.8 AfS: 0.5 MED: 0.7 PP: 0.4)	8.1
Ipsos	12–15 Jun 2020	1,501	9	31	3	7	4	17	7	20	2	11
Sifo	1–11 Jun 2020	7,578	9.6	30.0	3.5	7.0	3.4	19.5	6.8	18.9	1.3	10.5
Demoskop	26 May–3 Jun 2020	2,437	8.2	27.8	3.9	9.7	2.7	20.9	6.5	19.3	1.0	6.9
SKOP	31 May–2 Jun 2020	1,006	10.5	31.3	3.7	6.6	3.6	20.3	5.8	17.0	1.1	11.0
SCB	29 Apr–27 May 2020	9,208	8.2	33.7	4.1	6.0	3.3	20.1	6.4	17.1	1.1	13.6
Novus	27 Apr–24 May 2020	3,976	9.4	31.5	4.1	8.1	3.0	19.2	5.5	18.0	1.2	12.3
Ipsos	12–24 May 2020	1,530	9	31	4	7	3	20	6	20	1	11
Sentio	15–18 May 2020	–	9.2	28.2	3.5	4.7	3.1	19.4	7.8	22.2	2.0 (Note: FI: 0.2 AfS: 0.4 MED: 0.6 PP: 0.1)	6.0
Sifo	4–14 May 2020	7,310	9.0	31.7	3.9	7.2	3.4	18.6	6.1	18.9	1.5	12.8
SKOP	30 Apr–8 May 2020	1,019	9.7	32.6	2.6	7.0	4.4	20.4	5.2	16.3	1.8	12.2
Demoskop	28 Apr–5 May 2020	2,297	7.2	30.1	3.3	10.0	2.7	20.7	6.5	18.8	0.7	9.4
Ipsos	14–26 Apr 2020	1,544	9	29	4	7	4	18	6	21	1	8
Sentio	17–21 Apr 2020	–	9.0	27.5	4.1	5.8	3.4	18.7	5.4	24.2	1.9 (Note: FI: 0.2 AfS: 0.4 MED: 0.5 PP: 0.4)	3.3
Novus	30 Mar–19 Apr 2020	3,838	9.5	30.4	3.8	7.7	2.8	18.7	6.1	19.7	1.3	10.7
Sifo	30 Mar–8 Apr 2020	6,886	9.4	30.6	3.5	6.9	3.8	19.2	5.9	19.5	1.1	11.1
Demoskop	25 Mar–1 Apr 2020	2,453	7.7	27.9	4.0	10.0	3.0	19.2	6.7	20.8	0.7	7.1
Sentio	20–24 Mar 2020	–	10.5	22.0	5.2	5.8	2.3	19.5	7.1	24.9	2.7 (Note: FI: ? AfS: ? MED: ? PP: ?)	2.9
Novus	24 Feb–22 Mar 2020	3,737	9.8	25.6	4.5	8.1	3.8	18.0	6.5	22.0	1.7	3.6
Ipsos	10–20 Mar 2020	1,566	12	25	4	7	5	19	6	22	1	3
Sifo	2–12 Mar 2020	7,839	11.2	23.8	4.0	8.4	4.1	18.0	6.8	22.2	1.6	1.6
Demoskop	25 Feb–3 Mar 2020	2,326	10.4	22.6	3.1	9.4	4.1	19.5	7.5	22.1	1.3	0.5
Sentio	21–24 Feb 2020	–	11.1	21.5	3.6	7.9	1.8	19.6	5.3	27.8	1.3 (Note: FI: 0.1 AfS: 0.3 MED: 0.3 PP: 0.1)	6.3
Ipsos	11–23 Feb 2020	1,535	11	22	5	8	4	18	8	23	1	1
Novus	27 Jan–16 Feb 2020	3,098	10.9	23.2	4.5	8.1	3.9	18.0	5.9	23.9	1.6	0.7
Sifo	3–13 Feb 2020	8,328	11.4	23.6	4.2	8.1	4.4	17.5	6.1	23.3	1.5	0.3
Demoskop	25 Jan–5 Feb 2020	2,148	9.3	24.7	3.8	8.9	3.2	18.9	6.3	23.5	1.3	1.2
Sentio	24–28 Jan 2020	–	9.7	22.1	4.0	7.0	2.4	16.6	7.8	28.8	1.6 (Note: FI: 0.3 AfS: 0.2 MED: 0.3 PP: 0.1)	6.7
Ipsos	14–27 Jan 2020	1,528	11	23	4	9	4	17	7	24	2	1
Novus	7–26 Jan 2020	4,414	10.4	24.2	4.6	8.7	3.5	18.3	6.1	22.6	1.6	1.6
SKOP	14–24 Jan 2020	1,009	10.7	23.1	4.1	9.6	3.8	17.4	6.7	23.3	1.4	0.2
Sifo	6–16 Jan 2020	7,747	10.2	23.5	4.5	8.5	3.9	17.5	6.6	23.8	1.5	0.3
Demoskop	30 Dec 2019–7 Jan 2020	2,112	9.0	23.4	4.8	9.5	3.1	18.2	5.9	24.5	1.6	1.1
Sentio	13–18 Dec 2019	793	10.1	21.1	4.5	6.8	3.2	16.5	6.3	29.1	2.4 (Note: FI: 0.6 AfS: 0.7 MED: 0.5 PP: 0.0)	8.0
Ipsos	3–15 Dec 2019	1,572	10	25	5	8	5	16	6	24	1	1
Novus	18 Nov–15 Dec 2019	3,994	9.9	23.7	5.0	8.3	3.5	17.9	6.2	24.0	1.5	0.3
Sifo	2–12 Dec 2019	8,214	9.7	24.6	4.7	8.0	4.0	17.2	6.0	24.4	1.3	0.2
Demoskop	26 Nov–4 Dec 2019	2,079	7.9	24.3	4.4	9.6	3.9	17.5	5.9	25.4	1.1	1.1
SCB	28 Oct–26 Nov 2019	4,645	8.1	26.3	5.1	7.3	4.1	18.3	6.6	22.6	1.6	3.7
Ipsos	11–24 Nov 2019	1,551	8	25	5	8	3	17	7	25	2	Tie
Sentio	15–19 Nov 2019	–	8.5	22.5	4.9	7.0	2.5	16.9	6.8	28.5	2.2 (Note: FI: 0.5 AfS: 0.4 MED: 0.2 PP: 0.3)	6.0
Novus	21 Oct–17 Nov 2019	3,619	9.3	26.0	4.8	7.8	3.4	18.3	7.1	21.5	1.8	4.5
Sifo	4–14 Nov 2019	8,175	9.7	24.4	4.7	8.3	3.5	17.0	7.8	23.0	1.6	1.4
Demoskop	4–13 Nov 2019	2,048	9.8	22.2	4.8	7.7	3.9	17.8	7.6	24.0	2.2	1.8
Sentio	18–24 Oct 2019	–	9.6	24.2	4.2	6.4	4.7	16.8	6.4	25.4	1.8 (Note: FI: 0.4 AfS: 0.7 MED: 0.3 PP: 0.3)	1.2
Ipsos	8–21 Oct 2019	1,569	10	24	5	8	4	16	8	23	2	1
Novus	23 Sep–20 Oct 2019	3,745	8.4	25.8	5.0	8.5	3.7	19.5	7.0	20.5	1.6	5.3
Sifo	7–17 Oct 2019	7,792	9.2	24.9	5.0	8.4	3.9	17.7	6.7	22.7	1.5	2.2
Inizio	8–14 Oct 2019	2,132	8.0	24.7	4.2	10.1	3.2	19.3	6.5	22.6	1.4	2.1
Demoskop	24 Sep–1 Oct 2019	1,617	8.6	23.1	5.0	8.3	3.9	19.5	6.6	22.9	2.1	0.2
Inizio	20–25 Sep 2019	2,097	8.5	23.9	4.2	9.9	3.5	19.0	6.0	22.4	2.4	1.5
Sentio	20–24 Sep 2019	1,008	9.4	23.9	3.9	6.1	3.9	17.1	6.0	27.5	2.3 (Note: FI: 0.5 AfS: 0.6 MED: 0.2 PP: 0.1)	3.6
Ipsos	10–23 Sep 2019	1,537	9	26	5	9	5	19	7	19	1	7
Novus	26 Aug–22 Sep 2019	3,716	9.2	24.7	5.0	8.0	3.6	20.4	6.8	20.7	1.8	4
Sifo	2–12 Sep 2019	8,949	8.5	25.8	5.1	8.6	4.2	18.9	7.3	20.2	1.5	5.6
Demoskop	27 Aug–3 Sep 2019	1,611	8.8	24.0	4.9	8.4	4.6	19.4	6.5	21.4	1.8	2.6
Inizio	22–28 Aug 2019	2,015	7.9	25.5	4.2	9.4	4.2	18.3	7.7	21.0	1.9	4.5
Sentio	22–27 Aug 2019	793	10.5	23.2	4.7	6.1	5.4	18.3	5.8	23.5	2.0 (Note: FI: 0.6 AfS: 1.1 MED: 0.2 PP: 0.1)	0.3
Ipsos	13–25 Aug 2019	1,515	10	26	6	8	5	17	7	19	2	7
Novus	5–25 Aug 2019	5,115	9.0	26.3	5.6	9.4	3.7	18.5	7.2	18.4	1.9	7.8
Sifo	6–15 Aug 2019	6,316	8.7	26.8	4.9	8.8	3.8	19.1	8.4	18.2	1.4	7.7
Inizio	1–8 Aug 2019	2,076	8.5	25.6	3.6	10.3	3.6	19.6	7.3	19.7	1.7	5.9
SKOP	25 Jun–16 Jul 2019	1,048	8.9	25.6	4.7	9.5	5.7	17.0	9.2	18.0	1.4	7.6
Demoskop	24 Jun–1 Jul 2019	1,608	7.9	25.9	5.3	9.3	4.1	17.6	8.0	19.6	2.2	6.3
Inizio	17–24 Jun 2019	2,076	8.3	25.4	5.0	9.4	3.6	19.7	7.0	19.4	2.3	5.7
Novus	3–23 Jun 2019	2,746	9.0	26.7	5.9	10.1	3.6	18.8	7.7	16.7	1.5	7.9
Ipsos	4–18 Jun 2019	1,630	10	25	5	9	5	17	8	19	2	6
Sentio	3–13 Jun 2019	–	8.8	25.7	4.8	7.4	3.7	17.0	7.9	21.8	2.9 (Note: FI: 0.5 AfS: 0.7 MED: 0.4 PP: 0.4)	3.9
Sifo	3–13 Jun 2019	9,261	8.6	26.5	4.9	8.8	3.7	18.4	9.5	18.1	1.5	8.1
Demoskop	27 May–3 Jun 2019	1,614	8.0	27.1	5.1	8.9	3.8	18.2	7.5	19.9	1.6	7.2
Novus	6 May–2 Jun 2019	3,644	9.0	25.9	5.5	8.7	4.1	17.7	10.0	17.6	1.5	8.2
Inizio	21–28 May 2019	2,147	8.3	26.1	4.4	10.1	3.0	18.2	9.0	18.4	2.4	7.7
SCB	29 Apr–28 May 2019	4,506	8.7	27.6	5.6	6.9	3.7	16.0	13.0	17.1	1.3	10.5
2019 EP election	26 May 2019	–	6.8	23.5	11.5	10.8	4.1	16.8	8.6	15.3	2.5	6.7
SKOP	19–24 May 2019	1,938	10.5	25.3	3.7	9.6	4.0	16.4	12.8	16.9	0.9	8.4
Sentio	17–21 May 2019	1,007	10.1	25.0	4.7	6.8	3.3	15.5	10.4	21.2	3.1 (Note: FI: 0.7 AfS: 0.6 MED: 0.9 PP: 0.3)	3.8
Ipsos	6–21 May 2019	2,144	10	26	4	9	4	16	12	17	2	9
Sifo	6–16 May 2019	9,626	8.9	27.0	4.5	8.2	3.8	15.9	12.0	18.1	1.6	8.9
Demoskop	29 Apr–7 May 2019	1,618	8.7	26.6	4.3	9.1	3.1	15.7	11.5	19.2	1.8	7.4
Novus	8 Apr–5 May 2019	3,404	8.8	26.4	4.6	8.8	3.5	18.0	10.7	17.8	1.4	8.4
Inizio	22–29 Apr 2019	2,111	9.5	25.6	3.9	9.3	4.2	15.7	11.4	18.6	1.8	7.0
Ipsos	9–22 Apr 2019	1,486	10	27	4	8	4	16	12	17	2	10
Sifo	1–11 Apr 2019	8,278	8.7	27.3	4.6	7.5	3.4	16.0	12.2	18.9	1.4	8.4
Sentio	4–10 Apr 2019	789	9.3	25.6	4.3	6.4	3.8	17.5	10.7	20.1	2.3 (Note: FI: 0.4 AfS: 0.5 MED: 0.6 PP: 0.4)	5.5
Demoskop	26 Mar–3 Apr 2019	1,616	9.6	25.4	4.5	8.2	3.9	16.6	11.7	18.0	2.1	7.4
Novus	4–31 Mar 2019	3,668	9.7	27.2	3.5	8.2	3.7	17.5	10.6	18.1	1.5	9.1
Inizio	23–28 Mar 2019	2,980	8.6	26.5	4.2	9.1	3.3	16.5	12.1	18.2	1.4	8.3
Sentio	22–27 Mar 2019	1,002	10.2	24.7	3.9	6.1	3.1	17.4	12.7	19.2	2.5	5.5
SKOP	7–27 Mar 2019	1,510	8.8	28.7	3.1	9.5	4.2	18.0	10.1	16.5	1.2	10.7
Ipsos	12–25 Mar 2019	1,529	10	27	4	8	4	18	9	19	1	8
Sifo	3–14 Mar 2019	9,059	9.8	27.4	3.8	8.3	3.3	17.5	9.4	19.1	1.4	8.3
Demoskop	26 Feb–5 Mar 2019	1,611	9.3	25.8	4.1	7.5	3.0	18.4	10.6	19.4	1.9	6.4
Novus	4 Feb–3 Mar 2019	3,707	9.1	28.2	4.0	7.3	3.5	18.3	8.6	19.3	1.7	8.9
Sentio	22–25 Feb 2019	1,000	10.5	26.5	3.4	5.5	2.6	18.3	9.4	21.4	2.4 (Note: FI: 0.4 AfS: 0.2 MED: 0.6 PP: 0.4)	5.1
Ipsos	7–20 Feb 2019	1,504	10	28	4	8	4	17	9	19	1	9
Inizio	11–18 Feb 2019	2,137	9.2	27.1	3.4	9.7	2.7	17.7	9.0	19.5	1.9	7.6
Sifo	4–14 Feb 2019	8,186	9.6	28.4	4.3	7.7	3.8	17.2	8.6	19.2	1.2	9.2
Demoskop	29 Jan–5 Feb 2019	1,604	9.6	27.9	3.2	8.5	3.3	19.5	7.0	19.4	1.6	8.4
Novus	14 Jan–3 Feb 2019	3,045	9.1	29.0	3.4	7.5	2.7	18.3	7.4	21.2	1.4	7.8
Sentio	24–30 Jan 2019	1,001	9.5	27.8	4.0	7.1	3.9	17.7	7.3	20.4	2.3 (Note: FI: 0.5 AfS: 0.9 MED: 0.3 PP: 0.4)	6.1
Inizio	16–23 Jan 2019	2,089	9.7	28.2	3.8	8.3	3.2	19.0	8.3	18.4	1.2	9.2
Ipsos	10–20 Jan 2019	1,589	8	30	4	8	5	18	7	18	2	12
Sifo	14–17 Jan 2019	4,317	8.5	29.3	3.9	6.9	3.6	19.5	7.5	19.9	1.0	9.4
SKOP	3–17 Jan 2019	1,116	8.9	30.2	3.1	8.3	4.0	18.1	9.5	16.9	1.0	12.1
Novus	2–13 Jan 2019	2,342	7.6	31.8	3.9	7.6	3.4	18.9	6.2	19.2	1.4	12.6
Demoskop	2–8 Jan 2019	1,614	8.0	30.2	3.8	6.9	4.5	17.1	7.7	19.5	2.2	10.7
Inizio	19–26 Dec 2018	2,300	7.7	29.8	4.2	8.4	3.2	18.3	8.2	18.8	1.5	11.0
Ipsos	5–16 Dec 2018	1,537	8	32	4	7	4	18	8	18	1	14
Novus	12 Nov–16 Dec 2018	5,414	7.7	30.0	4.0	8.6	3.9	18.3	6.5	19.8	1.2	10.2
Sifo	3–13 Dec 2018	8,658	7.7	29.7	4.2	7.7	4.0	19.0	6.6	20.0	1.1	9.7
Inizio	4–12 Dec 2018	2,238	7.2	29.4	3.7	9.0	3.3	18.5	7.7	19.4	1.9	10.0
Demoskop	27 Nov–4 Dec 2018	1,616	8.0	28.4	4.1	8.4	4.4	18.9	5.8	20.7	1.3	7.7
Sentio	29 Nov–3 Dec 2018	1,035	8.0	28.4	3.9	6.9	4.2	18.0	6.1	22.3	2.3	6.1
SCB	29 Oct–27 Nov 2018	4,721	8.4	30.5	4.0	8.6	4.3	19.2	5.3	18.3	1.2	11.3
Inizio	14–19 Nov 2018	2,414	7.3	29.3	3.5	9.2	3.9	19.1	7.0	18.8	1.8	10.2
Ipsos	8–19 Nov 2018	1,521	8.2	28.3	4.1	10.1	4.5	18.2	5.3	20.0	1.3	8.3
Sifo	5–15 Nov 2018	9,324	7.6	29.0	4.1	9.0	4.9	18.1	6.7	19.3	1.4	9.7
Novus	15 Oct–11 Nov 2018	5,050	7.9	29.8	4.3	8.9	3.7	19.2	5.9	19.2	1.1	10.6
Sentio	1–7 Nov 2018	1,006	9.3	28.1	3.8	9.3	3.3	18.6	5.3	20.2	1.7	7.9
Demoskop	30 Oct–6 Nov 2018	1,616	7.8	29.2	4.2	8.8	4.1	18.3	4.9	21.1	1.7	8.1
Inizio	26 Oct–6 Nov 2018	2,187	7.8	29.4	3.8	9.8	4.0	18.2	5.9	18.9	2.1	10.5
Ipsos	16–24 Oct 2018	1,556	8.1	28.6	4.8	9.2	5.0	19.1	5.1	18.8	1.4	9.5
Sifo	8–18 Oct 2018	8,583	7.9	29.4	4.1	9.1	4.9	18.8	6.0	18.6	1.3	10.6
Sentio	5–9 Oct 2018	1,011	8.4	27.4	5.0	7.5	4.2	20.0	5.6	20.3	1.6	7.1
Inizio	1–8 Oct 2018	1,763	7.3	30.0	4.3	8.7	4.9	19.4	6.3	17.6	1.7	10.6
Novus	1–4 Oct 2018	2,200	8.4	28.3	4.4	8.4	4.6	19.7	6.0	18.8	1.4	8.6
Demoskop	25 Sep–2 Oct 2018	1,616	7.7	30.6	3.5	8.7	4.8	18.8	6.1	18.0	1.8	11.8
Sifo	24 Sep–2 Oct 2018	8,108	7.8	28.5	4.3	8.8	5.3	19.2	6.4	18.3	1.3	9.3
2018 election	9 Sep 2018	–	8.0	28.3	4.4	8.6	5.5	19.8	6.3	17.5	1.6	8.4

== Seat distribution ==
=== Seat projection ===
There are 349 seats in total – 175 needed for a majority.
Parties are denoted with dashes (–) if no indication is given of their level in polls.

Polling firm	Fieldwork date	V	S	MP	C	L	M	KD	SD	Lead
Novus	February 2022	37	111	–	28	–	77	21	75	34
Novus	January 2022	40	118	–	25	–	70	21	75	43
Sifo	January 2022	38	117	–	27	–	80	15	72	37
Novus	December 2021	38	111	–	29	–	81	18	72	30
Sifo	December 2021	38	117	–	26	–	74	19	75	43
Novus	November 2021	41	93	17	31	–	83	15	69	10
Sifo	November 2021	34	110	–	30	–	79	20	76	31
Demoskop	November 2021	31	102	–	37	–	89	20	71	13
Novus	October 2021	39	94	15	32	–	82	17	70	12
Sentio	October 2021	46	81	–	20	–	87	23	92	5
Sifo	October 2021	40	101	–	30	–	83	19	76	18
Novus	September 2021	40	94	16	32		80	16	71	14
Sentio	September 2021	39	84	15	21	–	77	28	85	1
Sifo	September 2021	39	95	15	33	–	77	17	73	18
Demoskop	September 2021	31	100	–	36	–	83	21	78	17
Demoskop	August 2021	38	92	–	38	–	87	20	74	5
Sentio	August 2021	38	84	18	24	15	67	18	85	1
Sentio	July 2021	37	85	15	22	15	75	22	78	17
Novus	July 2021	50	89	–	33	–	79	17	81	8
Ipsos	June 2021	45	90	–	37	–	83	23	71	7
Novus	June 2021	42	96	–	29	–	82	19	81	14
Sifo	May 2021	38	100	–	34	–	84	18	72	16
Novus	May 2021	34	103	15	32	–	83	19	66	20
Demoskop	April 2021	32	97	–	37	–	87	20	76	10
Sifo	April 2021	34	103	15	33	–	77	18	70	26
Demoskop	March 2021	35	92	–	38	–	93	22	69	1
Sifo	March 2021	37	99	15	33	–	84	15	66	15
Sifo	February 2021	38	106	–	29	–	90	14	72	16
Sifo	January 2021	37	107	–	31	–	84	18	72	23
Sifo	December 2020	38	107	–	30	–	84	18	72	23
Sifo	November 2020	36	99	15	28	–	77	22	72	22
Sentio	November 2020	38	91	–	23	–	77	23	97	6
SCB	November 2020	34	107	15	28	–	81	20	64	26
Sifo	October 2020	37	96	15	29	–	77	22	73	19
Sifo	August 2020	34	102	–	29	15	73	23	73	29
Sifo	June 2020	37	113	–	26	–	75	27	71	38
Sifo	May 2020	33	121	–	27	–	72	23	73	48
SCB	May 2020	30	123	15	22	–	73	23	63	50
Sifo	April 2020	34	117	–	27	–	72	23	76	41
Sifo	March 2020	39	85	14	28	14	65	26	78	7
Sifo	February 2020	40	86	14	28	14	65	21	81	5
Demoskop	February 2020	38	83	–	34	15	71	27	81	2
Ipsos	February 2020	39	78	17	28	14	63	28	82	4
Sentio	January 2020	35	81	14	25	–	61	28	105	24
Sifo	January 2020	37	88	15	29	–	65	26	89	1
Sifo	December 2019	36	91	18	29	–	63	29	89	2
Novus	December 2019	36	87	18	31	–	66	23	88	1
Sentio	December 2019	37	78	15	25	–	61	23	107	29
SCB	November 2019	29	93	18	26	15	65	23	80	13
Sifo	November 2019	38	88	18	29	–	62	29	85	3
Sentio	October 2019	36	92	17	24	–	70	22	89	3
Demoskop	October 2019	32	86	18	31	–	73	24	85	1
Sifo	October 2019	33	92	18	29	–	66	26	85	7
Sifo	September 2019	28	92	18	33	14	67	25	72	20
Sifo	August 2019	33	99	18	33	–	71	29	66	33
Sifo	June 2019	33	99	18	30	–	66	37	66	33
SCB	May 2019	32	101	21	25	–	59	48	63	38
Sifo	May 2019	33	100	18	30	–	58	44	66	34
Sifo	April 2019	33	99	17	28	–	59	44	69	30
Novus	April 2019	37	104	–	31	–	67	41	69	35
Demoskop	March 2019	34	95	15	28	–	68	39	71	24
Sifo	March 2019	39	104	–	32	–	66	35	73	31
Sifo	February 2019	37	103	15	29	–	62	33	70	33
Sifo	January 2019	34	110	–	27	–	72	30	76	34
Sifo	December 2018	28	106	14	28	11	66	25	71	35
SCB	November 2018	30	108	14	30	15	68	19	65	43
Sifo	November 2018	28	103	13	32	18	64	25	66	37
Sifo	October 2018	28	103	13	32	18	67	21	67	36
2018 election	9 Sep 2018	28	100	16	31	20	70	22	62	30

== Regional polling ==
Opinion polls for the general election in Sweden's regions and municipalities.

=== Stockholm municipality ===
==== Vote share in regional election ====
Polling firm	Fieldwork date	Sample size	V	S	MP	C	L	M	KD	SD	Oth.	Lead
SCB	May 2021	485	18.7	27.7	6.0	9.8	4.7	19.4	1.9	10.5	1.3	8.3
SCB	November 2020	477	19.4	27.2	7.3	7.1	6.4	20.5	1.8	8.6	1.7	6.7
SCB	May 2020	491	14.6	29.7	7.4	8.1	6.2	20.8	4.4	7.4	1.3	8.9
SCB	November 2019	447	13.6	24.0	7.5	10.3	7.1	21.4	3.4	11.4	1.3	2.6
SCB	May 2019	436	12.0	21.3	10.1	8.1	6.8	21.7	8.7	8.7	2.6	0.4
SCB	November 2018	463	16.2	22.6	6.8	9.3	5.8	23.7	4.4	9.3	1.9	1.1
2018 election	9 Sep 2018	–	13.1	23.8	7.7	9.1	7.9	21.9	4.9	9.8	1.9	1.9

=== Stockholm County ===
Excludes the Municipality of Stockholm.

==== Vote share in regional election ====
Polling firm	Fieldwork date	Sample size	V	S	MP	C	L	M	KD	SD	Oth.	Lead
SCB	May 2021	593	6.8	23.9	4.9	6.9	2.7	31.3	5.8	16.8	–	7.4
SCB	November 2020	614	6.1	25.0	4.2	4.8	3.4	30.8	6.8	16.5	2.4	5.8
SCB	May 2020	629	6.0	26.3	3.6	6.0	4.1	30.0	6.6	16.5	0.9	3.7
SCB	November 2019	601	6.9	25.0	6.4	9.0	5.0	21.4	6.4	18.6	1.4	3.6
SCB	May 2019	573	7.1	25.7	5.7	7.7	5.7	22.8	11.6	12.7	1.0	2.9
SCB	November 2018	597	6.4	26.8	4.2	7.6	7.0	28.5	5.2	13.7	0.7	1.7
2018 election	9 Sep 2018	–	6.9	23.1	4.8	8.6	6.9	26.0	7.0	15.2	1.5	2.9

=== Gothenburg municipality ===
==== Vote share in regional election ====
Polling firm	Fieldwork date	Sample size	V	S	MP	C	L	M	KD	SD	Oth.	Lead
SCB	May 2021	253	14.5	28.4	4.5	8.8	4.3	23.5	2.6	12.1	–	4.9
SCB	November 2020	249	12.5	28.0	6.5	5.4	5.7	17.6	3.9	17.0	3.5	10.4
SCB	May 2020	257	12.6	30.9	4.2	7.8	4.3	26.3	2.2	10.0	–	4.6
SCB	November 2019	255	13.8	20.1	3.1	8.8	5.4	21.4	3.1	20.9	–	0.5
SCB	May 2019	243	15.1	23.8	7.5	7.5	8.4	16.6	9.6	8.6	3.0	7.2
SCB	November 2018	258	17.3	21.8	9.1	7.3	8.2	20.8	4.3	9.5	1.8	1.0
2018 election	9 Sep 2018	–	14.0	23.8	7.0	7.1	7.3	19.9	5.5	13.5	2.1	3.9

=== West Sweden ===
Includes the counties of Västra Götaland and Halland but excludes the municipality of Gothenburg.

==== Vote share in regional election ====
Polling firm	Fieldwork date	Sample size	V	S	MP	C	L	M	KD	SD	Oth.	Lead
SCB	May 2021	684	6.3	27.3	4.3	7.2	2.5	23.9	7.1	19.8	1.6	3.4
SCB	November 2020	714	7.1	30.6	4.4	8.5	3.8	20.3	6.7	17.8	0.9	10.3
SCB	May 2020	720	6.4	34.6	3.3	6.8	3.7	19.4	7.4	17.2	1.2	15.2
SCB	November 2019	667	7.8	28.8	4.7	6.2	4.8	17.6	7.4	20.4	2.3	8.4
SCB	May 2019	673	7.7	28.9	4.2	5.3	4.9	15.7	14.2	17.3	1.9	11.6
SCB	November 2018	707	7.3	31.3	3.6	8.2	4.7	20.2	6.8	17.4	3.5	11.1
2018 election	9 Sep 2018	–	6.0	27.5	3.8	9.0	5.5	20.2	7.3	19.3	1.4	7.3

=== Greater Malmö ===
==== Vote share in regional election ====
Polling firm	Fieldwork date	Sample size	V	S	MP	C	L	M	KD	SD	Oth.	Lead
SCB	May 2021	310	8.9	28.9	4.6	9.4	1.7	24.9	–	19.4	1.5	4.0
SCB	November 2020	312	9.6	26.8	4.3	6.7	3.4	25.8	2.0	20.2	1.2	1.0
SCB	May 2020	347	11.3	28.9	6.6	4.9	3.7	21.8	1.5	20.6	0.7	7.1
SCB	November 2019	325	10.2	23.2	7.3	4.7	5.2	22.7	4.8	20.3	1.6	0.5
SCB	May 2019	297	8.2	25.2	6.3	6.5	4.5	20.9	7.5	20.2	0.7	4.3
SCB	November 2018	320	9.2	24.3	6.9	6.1	4.7	26.3	3.3	17.7	1.5	2.0
2018 election (Note: Greater Malmö is a polling area but does not have a collective election result.)	9 Sep 2018	–	–	–	–	–	–	–	–	–	–	–

=== Southern Sweden ===
Includes the counties of Blekinge and Scania but excludes Greater Malmö.

==== Vote share in regional election ====
Polling firm	Fieldwork date	Sample size	V	S	MP	C	L	M	KD	SD	Oth.	Lead
SCB	May 2021	326	6.0	30.6	–	7.1	3.8	19.7	3.1	27.4	–	3.2
SCB	November 2020	314	3.7	30.2	–	5.9	4.9	22.3	5.6	24.1	3.3 (Note: Includes the Green Party.)	6.1
SCB	May 2020	363	3.0	31.0	4.2	4.9	4.6	20.1	7.0	24.5	0.7	6.5
SCB	November 2019	345	3.3	25.0	5.7	4.4	3.1	15.2	6.9	34.2	2.2	9.2
SCB	May 2019	332	4.9	26.6	6.2	5.6	2.7	15.1	11.6	25.0	2.3	1.6
SCB	November 2018	333	4.4	31.3	5.0	4.8	4.6	18.7	3.6	25.4	2.1	5.9
2018 election (Note: Southern Götaland is a polling area but does not have a collective election result.)	9 Sep 2018	–	–	–	–	–	–	–	–	–	–	–

=== Småland and the islands ===
Includes the counties of Gotland, Jönköping, Kalmar and Kronoberg, i.e., Småland, Gotland and Öland.

==== Vote share in regional election ====
Polling firm	Fieldwork date	Sample size	V	S	MP	C	L	M	KD	SD	Oth.	Lead
SCB	May 2021	403	5.9	31.8	3.9	12.8	1.2	21.7	5.1	17.2	–	10.1
SCB	November 2020	394	7.5	27.5	3.7	11.1	1.6	24.3	7.1	16.9	0.3	3.2
SCB	May 2020	419	6.0	33.7	3.6	7.9	2.9	16.7	6.4	21.6	1.3	12.1
SCB	November 2019	419	5.8	26.3	4.1	7.6	2.2	17.8	11.7	23.3	1.2	3.0
SCB	May 2019	402	7.6	28.7	2.2	9.3	1.7	15.2	15.3	19.1	0.9	9.6
SCB	November 2018	397	4.8	28.9	2.6	12.0	3.6	18.3	9.2	18.7	1.9	10.2
2018 election	9 Sep 2018	–	5.8	29.3	3.3	10.4	3.8	17.8	9.0	19.4	1.2	9.9

=== Gotland ===
Gotland individually.

==== Vote share in regional election ====
Polling firm	Fieldwork date	Sample size	V	S	MP	C	L	M	KD	SD	Oth.	Lead
Novus	Nov 2021	515	12.6	37.9	9.4	11.1	0.8	11.4	2.3	13.9	0.4	24.0
2018 election	9 Sep 2018	–	9.0	29.8	5.0	17.2	3.7	16.6	4.1	12.7	1.9	12.6

=== Eastern Central Sweden ===
Includes the counties of Södermanland, Uppsala, Västmanland, Örebro and Östergötland.

==== Vote share in regional election ====
Polling firm	Fieldwork date	Sample size	V	S	MP	C	L	M	KD	SD	Oth.	Lead
SCB	May 2021	788	8.9	28.0	3.8	8.4	2.4	21.7	4.7	20.0	2.0	6.3
SCB	November 2020	801	9.8	28.6	3.5	7.2	3.8	23.7	5.5	16.1	1.9	4.9
SCB	May 2020	825	9.5	29.1	4.2	6.4	3.7	24.2	6.1	16.1	0.8	4.9
SCB	November 2019	799	8.1	27.8	5.9	6.7	4.0	20.5	7.0	19.5	0.6	7.3
SCB	May 2019	761	6.8	29.2	5.2	7.2	4.3	19.4	8.9	16.9	2.2	9.8
SCB	November 2018	804	6.9	32.1	4.7	8.8	4.1	18.9	5.1	16.3	3.0	13.2
2018 election	9 Sep 2018	–	–	–	–	–	–	–	–	–	–	–

=== Södermanland ===
Södermanland individually.

==== Vote share in regional election ====
Polling firm	Fieldwork date	Sample size	V	S	MP	C	L	M	KD	SD	Oth.	Lead
Novus	November 2021	1,000	6.2	29.5	3.9	7.7	1.5	23.9	3.8	21.3	2.1	5.6
2018 election (Note: Southern Götaland is a polling area but does not have a collective election result.)	9 Sep 2018	–	6.6	31.4	3.7	7.4	4.3	20.4	5.5	19.3	1.3	11.0

=== Uppsala County ===
Uppsala County individually.

==== Vote share in regional election ====
Polling firm	Fieldwork date	Sample size	V	S	MP	C	L	M	KD	SD	Oth.	Lead
Novus	October 2021	1,040	15.2	26.8	8.1	9.9	4.3	16.8	4.2	13.7	0.9	10.0
2018 election (Note: Southern Götaland is a polling area but does not have a collective election result.)	9 Sep 2018	–	8.7	27.0	5.6	9.2	6.2	19.0	6.9	15.4	2.0	8.0

=== Västmanland ===
Västmanland individually.

==== Vote share in regional election ====
Polling firm	Fieldwork date	Sample size	V	S	MP	C	L	M	KD	SD	Oth.	Lead
Novus	October 2021	1,014	7.8	38.2	3.8	5.5	3.6	18.4	2.6	18.9	1.1	19.3
2018 election (Note: Southern Götaland is a polling area but does not have a collective election result.)	9 Sep 2018	–	7.1	31.4	3.0	6.7	5.5	19.2	5.8	20.1	1.4	11.3

=== Northern Central Sweden ===
Includes the counties of Dalarna, Gävleborg and Värmland.

==== Vote share in regional election ====
Polling firm	Fieldwork date	Sample size	V	S	MP	C	L	M	KD	SD	Oth.	Lead
SCB	May 2021	385	9.3	35.1	1.7	8.2	1.7	18.3	4.3	18.4	3.1	16.7
SCB	November 2020	395	9.6	35.9	2.2	6.5	2.6	16.1	6.8	18.2	2.1	17.7
SCB	May 2020	392	8.4	37.7	1.4	7.2	4.0	14.5	7.1	17.9	1.8	19.8
SCB	November 2019	390	8.2	29.7	2.2	8.8	3.2	16.5	6.4	23.9	1.1	5.8
SCB	May 2019	380	8.3	32.3	2.6	10.0	2.3	15.0	8.5	18.8	2.2	13.5
SCB	November 2018	401	7.7	32.3	–	12.7	2.0	18.0	5.1	20.0	2.2 (Note: Includes Green Party.)	12.3
2018 election (Note: Northern Central Sweden is a polling area but does not have a collective election result.)	9 Sep 2018	–	–	–	–	–	–	–	–	–	–	–

=== Northern Sweden ===
Includes the counties of Jämtland, Norrbotten, Västerbotten and Västernorrland.

==== Vote share in regional election ====
Polling firm	Fieldwork date	Sample size	V	S	MP	C	L	M	KD	SD	Oth.	Lead
SCB	May 2021	429	9.6	42.2	2.6	9.1	2.8	12.4	5.1	14.7	1.6	27.5
SCB	November 2020	422	8.8	40.2	1.5	9.1	2.5	16.1	3.8	15.3	2.7	24.1
SCB	May 2020	445	7.9	43.3	4.2	9.3	2.4	9.3	5.8	16.1	1.7	27.2
SCB	November 2019	397	10.6	37.1	5.6	6.4	1.4	12.2	5.6	19.6	2.2	15.5
SCB	May 2019	409	11.0	41.2	5.8	6.9	2.2	9.4	6.7	13.3	3.5	27.9
SCB	November 2018	441	11.4	43.2	4.3	8.1	2.3	12.3	2.8	12.1	3.5	30.9
2018 election	9 Sep 2018	–	10.3	38.9	3.2	9.9	3.4	13.5	5.1	14.2	1.5	24.7

== Municipal polling ==
Polling for the municipal elections.

=== Graphical summary ===
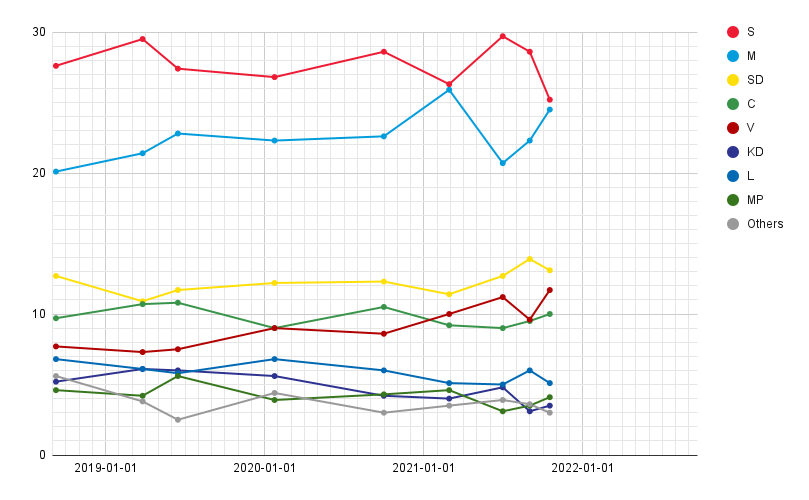

==== Vote share ====
Polling firm	Fieldwork date	Sample size	V	S	MP	C	L	M	KD	SD	Oth.	Lead
SKOP	Feb 2022	1,013	9.0	30.8	4.5	8.5	4.7	21.8	4.1	13.4	3.3	9.0
SKOP	15-17 Oct 2021	1,011	11.7	25.2	4.1	10.0	5.1	24.5	3.5	13.1	3.0	0.7
SKOP	Sep 2021	1,030	9.6	28.6	3.5	9.5	6.0	22.3	3.1	13.9	3.6	6.3
SKOP	Jul 2021	1,013	11.2	29.7	3.1	9.0	5.0	20.7	4.8	12.7	3.9	9.0
SKOP	23–28 Feb 2021	1,000	10.0	26.3	4.6	9.2	5.1	25.9	4.0	11.4	3.5	0.4
SKOP	Oct 2020	1,000	8.6	28.6	4.3	10.5	6.0	22.6	4.2	12.3	3.0	6.0
SKOP	14–24 Jan 2020	1,009	9.0	26.8	3.9	9.0	6.8	22.3	5.6	12.2	4.4	4.5
SKOP	25 Jun–16 Jul 2019	1,048	7.5	27.4	5.6	10.8	5.8	22.8	6.0	11.7	2.5	4.6
SKOP	7–27 Mar 2019	1,510	7.3	29.5	4.2	10.7	6.1	21.4	6.1	10.9	3.8	8.1
2018 municipal election	9 Sep 2018	–	7.7	27.6	4.6	9.7	6.8	20.1	5.2	12.7	5.6	7.5

=== Stockholm municipality ===
==== Vote share in municipal election ====
Polling firm	Fieldwork date	Sample size	V	S	MP	C	L	M	KD	SD	FI	Oth.	Lead
Ipsos	16–26 Nov 2021	867	18	24	8	9	5	21	4	9	1	–	3
Ipsos	Oct 2020	–	15	23	7	7	9	23	3	10	2	2	Tie
2018 municipal election	9 Sep 2018	–	13.0	22.3	8.3	7.9	10.1	21.0	5.1	8.0	3.3	1.1	1.3

=== Gothenburg municipality ===
==== Vote share in municipal election ====
Polling firm	Fieldwork date	Sample size	V	S	MP	C	L	M	KD	SD	D	FI	Oth.	Lead
Sifo	Jun 2022	–	16.7	25.3	5.6	3.0	5.7	19.6	3.1	10.1	6.9	0.7	3.3	5.7
Sifo	May 2022	–	17.4	25.7	4.9	3.5	5.1	20.1	3.5	11.5	5.5	1.0	1.8	5.6
Sifo	30 Mar - 4 Apr 2022	1,001	18	26.2	5.2	4.1	3.3	20.7	2.7	11.6	5.3	1.4	1.5	5.5
Sifo	Mar 2022	–	18.1	27.5	3.6	4.3	3.3	19.4	3.5	11.7	6.2	0.4	1.9	8.1
Sifo	Feb 2022	–	17.1	25.1	3.8	3.2	4.9	21.0	2.6	12.8	7.6	1.0	1.1	4.1
Sifo	2–7 Sep 2021	907	13.3	21.1	4.2	5.7	2.5	18.3	2.5	16.7	13.3	0.7	2	3
Sifo	23–28 Feb 2021	–	17	20	6	4	4	18	2	12	16	–	1	2
2018 municipal election	9 Sep 2018	–	12.6	20.5	6.9	4.0	7.2	14.5	3.3	8.3	17.0	2.3	3.5	3.5

=== Malmö municipality ===
==== Vote share in municipal election ====
Polling firm	Fieldwork date	Sample size	V	S	MP	C	L	M	KD	SD	Oth.	Lead
Demoskop	12 Feb 2022 - 28 Apr 2022	963	13.4	34.8	4.4	3.5	2.8	22.3	2	14.1	2.7	12.5
2018 municipal election	9 Sep 2018	–	11.1	31.1	5.4	4.2	6	20.7	2.3	16.4	3	10.4

=== Preferred mayor ===
Polling firm	Date	Katrin Stjernfeldt Jammeh (S)	Helena Nanne (M)
Demoskop	14 Feb - 16 Mar 2022	42%	27%

=== Uppsala municipality ===
==== Vote share in municipal election ====
Polling firm	Fieldwork date	Sample size	V	S	MP	C	L	M	KD	SD	FI	Oth.	Lead
Demoskop	April 2021	963	13	22	6	8	4	24	9	12	0	2	2
2018 municipal election	9 Sep 2018	–	10.7	25.3	7.3	9.6	9.3	17.4	7.1	9.1	2.6	1.8	7.9

=== Lund municipality ===
==== Vote share in municipal election ====
Polling firm	Fieldwork date	Sample size	V	S	MP	C	L	M	KD	SD	FI	Oth.	Lead
Demoskop	10 Feb-28 Apr 2022	1000	13.2	24.6	9.3	8	15.3	15	2.4	7.3	0.5	7.1	9.3
2018 municipal election	9 Sep 2018	–	8.6	20.4	9.5	6.3	13.4	16.4	2.7	9.4	2.9	10.5	7.9

=== Sölvesborg municipality ===
==== Vote share in municipal election ====
Polling firm	Fieldwork date	Sample size	V	S	MP	C	L	M	KD	SD	SoL	Oth.	Lead
Sifo	7-21 Sep 2021	500	4	28	2	2	2	19	4	37	1	1	9
Sifo	16 Mar–1 Apr 2020	500	6	27	2	5	2	15	5	36	1	1	9
2018 municipal election	9 Sep 2018	–	3.8	33.1	1.4	4.9	2.4	17.5	3.1	29.0	3.6	1.3	4.1

== Leadership polling ==
=== Approval ratings ===
==== Share ====
Polling firm	Date	Jonas Sjöstedt (V)	Nooshi Dadgostar (V)	Stefan Löfven (S)	Magdalena Andersson (S)	Gustav Fridolin (MP)	Per Bolund (MP)	Isabella Lövin (MP)	Märta Stenevi (MP)	Annie Lööf (C)	Jan Björklund (L)	Nyamko Sabuni (L)	Johan Pehrson (L)	Ulf Kristersson (M)	Ebba Busch (KD)	Jimmie Åkesson (SD)
Demoskop	26 July–4 Aug 2022	–	29%	–	53%	–	14%	–	14%	26%	–	–	31%	40%	40%	40%
Sifo	1–4 July 2022	–	22%	–	58%	–	9%	–	9%	26%	–	–	21%	35%	26%	28%
Demoskop	27–30 Jun 2022	–	27%	–	52%	–	13%	–	12%	24%	–	–	29%	42%	40%	40%
Novus	16–21 Jun 2022	–	21%	–	56%	–	9%	–	10%	22%	–	–	18%	33%	29%	27%
Sifo	2–3 Jun 2022	–	23%	–	62%	–	9%	–	8%	24%	–	–	14%	37%	30%	30%
Novus	13–18 May	–	20%	–	57%	–	8%	–	9%	19%	–	–	11%	39%	31%	30%
Sifo	29 April–1 May 2022	–	23%	–	58%	–	8%	–	7%	21%	–	–	9%	34%	26%	26%
Novus	15–20 April 2022	–	22%	–	54%	–	7%	–	6%	18%	–	–	7%	34%	24%	26%
Sifo	1–2 April 2022	–	23%	–	61%	–	8%	–	7%	23%	–	10%	–	39%	30%	28%
Ipsos	15–27 March 2022	–	22%	–	56%	–	10%	–	8%	24%	–	11%	–	39%	28%	29%
Novus	3–9 March 2022	–	23%	–	59%	–	6%	–	6%	22%	–	9%	–	36%	27%	28%
Sifo	4–6 March 2022	–	24%	–	62%	–	8%	–	7%	25%	–	9%	–	36%	26%	27%
Novus	3–8 February 2022	–	30%	–	53%	–	6%	–	6%	22%	–	6%	–	33%	28%	26%
Sifo	February 2022	–	30%	–	52%	–	9%	–	6%	23%	–	8%	–	35%	28%	31%
Sifo	7–10 January 2022	–	29%	–	51%	–	8%	–	7%	24%	–	9%	–	32%	25%	29%
Sifo	29 November–2 December 2021	–	32%	–	50%	–	9%	–	9%	22%	–	11%	–	34%	26%	28%
Novus	18–24 November 2021	–	30%	–	40%	–	10%	–	8%	23%	–	9%	–	33%	24%	29%
Sifo	5–8 November 2021	–	28%	–	48%	–	11%	–	10%	30%	–	11%	–	35%	23%	28%
Sifo	4–7 October 2021	–	27%	38%	41%	–	12%	–	10%	29%	–	10%	–	35%	25%	30%
Novus	9–15 September 2021	–	32%	37%	45%	–	13%	–	12%	24%	–	8%	–	35%	22%	29%
Sifo	10–12 September 2021	–	32%	40%	–	–	11%	–	9%	29%	–	14%	–	38%	27%	28%
Sifo	8–12 August 2021	–	33%	36%	–	–	12%	–	11%	27%	–	10%	–	38%	26%	30%
Sifo	2–4 July 2021	–	29%	38%	–	–	11%	–	10%	26%	–	11%	–	36%	28%	28%
Novus	17–22 June 2021	–	19%	38%	–	–	13%	–	9%	25%	–	9%	–	35%	24%	29%
Demoskop	25–30 March 2021	–	22%	34%	–	–	18%	–	12%	28%	–	10%	–	43%	32%	36%
Sifo	March 2021	–	13%	39%	–	–	13%	–	4%	30%	–	9%	–	38%	23%	26%
Novus	11–17 March 2021	–	24%	36%	–	–	13%	–	8%	24%	–	7%	–	36%	26%	24%
Novus	14–19 January 2021	–	14%	36%	–	–	12%	11%	–	27%	–	5%	–	37%	24%	25%
Sifo	30 Dec 2020–3 January 2021	–	13%	39%	–	–	12%	13%	–	25%	–	7%	–	35%	26%	26%
Novus	3–9 December 2020	–	11%	37%	–	–	11%	8%	–	22%	–	6%	–	36%	26%	25%
Novus	10–16 September 2020	36%	–	35%	–	–	10%	11%	–	24%	–	8%	–	32%	29%	27%
Demoskop	1–7 September 2020	46%	–	30%	–	–	13%	11%	–	24%	–	8%	–	42%	43%	38%
Novus	18–25 June 2020	34%	–	40%	–	–	11%	11%	–	21%	–	7%	–	34%	31%	26%
Sifo	29 May–1 June 2020	38%	–	47%	–	–	10%	11%	–	27%	–	7%	–	35%	33%	27%
Sifo	30 Apr–4 May 2020	41%	–	50%	–	–	8%	11%	–	29%	–	11%	–	32%	33%	25%
Ipsos	14–26 April 2020	36%	–	44%	–	–	14%	13%	–	25%	–	13%	–	31%	34%	27%
Demoskop	12–15 April 2020	41%	–	49%	–	–	16%	14%	–	26%	–	11%	–	38%	38%	33%
Novus	28–30 March 2020	40%	–	44%	–	–	11%	11%	–	24%	–	8%	–	30%	31%	27%
Novus	February 2020	40%	–	26%	–	–	9%	11%	–	21%	–	9%	–	26%	33%	32%
Novus	December 2019	28%	–	23%	–	–	9%	12%	–	22%	–	10%	–	25%	31%	31%
Demoskop	December 2019	36%	–	29%	–	–	18%	17%	–	27%	–	15%	–	41%	45%	40%
Demoskop	October 2019	32%	–	37%	–	–	16%	15%	–	26%	–	13%	–	34%	39%	36%
Sifo	Oct 2019	29%	–	32%	–	–	9%	11%	–	27%	–	11%	–	27%	35%	30%
Novus	September 2019	26%	–	29%	–	–	8%	11%	–	23%	–	10%	–	29%	35%	29%
Novus	June 2019	30%	–	30%	–	–	9%	10%	–	23%	–	21%	–	29%	33%	27%
Novus	May 2019	27%	–	30%	–	–	8%	10%	–	21%	15%	–	–	22%	36%	26%
Demoskop	May 2019	34%	–	34%	–	12%	–	14%	–	22%	17%	–	–	28%	45%	32%
Demoskop	April 2019	35%	–	38%	–	14%	–	18%	–	26%	19%	–	–	32%	45%	33%
Demoskop	March 2019	38%	–	36%	–	16%	–	15%	–	25%	20%	–	–	35%	44%	29%
Novus	January 2019	26%	–	34%	–	11%	–	12%	–	21%	15%	–	–	26%	31%	23%
Novus	November 2018	23%	–	33%	–	9%	–	8%	–	26%	17%	–	–	32%	33%	27%
Demoskop	1–7 Nov 2018	34%		39%	–	11%		18%		36%	24%			35%	34%	27%
	Oct 2018	34%		39%	–	15%		19%		41%	34%			43%	42%	27%

=== Preferred prime minister ===
Polling firm	Date	Stefan Löfven (S)	Magdalena Andersson (S)	Ulf Kristersson (M)
Sifo	Dec 2021	–	47%	34%
Novus	4-9 Oct 2021	–	50%	40%
Demoskop	2–9 Oct 2020	40%	–	51%
SKOP	7–27 Mar 2019	53.5%	–	46.5%

== See also ==
- Opinion polling for the 2014 Swedish general election
- Opinion polling for the 2018 Swedish general election
