= Novus Group International =

Swedish research company

- Novus Group International AB
- Formation: 2006
- Founder: Alf Sjöström
- Headquarters: Stockholm, Sweden
- Region served: Sweden
- Services: Polling
- Owner: Gallup
- CEO: Ana Serafimovska

Novus Group International is a Swedish research company that works with opinion, market and strategy. Novus is a public company listed on the Spotlight Stock Market in Stockholm. The company has its headquarters at Sveavägen in Stockholm.

According to a study by statistical researchers at Lund University, who analyzed 509 party sympathy surveys between 2006 and 2013, Novus consistently ranked closest to the average among Swedish opinion polls. Its operations are structured into three business areas: Novus Opinion, Market and Loyalty.

The company was founded in 2006 by Alf Sjöström, who was previously Deputy CEO of Sifo and founder and CEO of Svenska Gallup, and was CEO until his death in 2011, when Torbjörn Sjöström took over as CEO.

The main owner of Novus is Gallup Nordic with 62%, which is also part of Gallup International.

In 2026, the Board of Directors appointed Ana Serafimovska as the new Chief Executive Officer. Novus has published polls for the 2026 Swedish general election.
