= Opinion polling for the 2026 Swedish general election =

- 13 September 2026

In the run-up to the 2026 Swedish general election on 13 September 2026, various organisations have carried out opinion polling to gauge voting intention in Sweden. The date range for these opinion polls are from the 2022 Swedish general election, held on 11 September, to the present day.

== Opinion polls ==
=== Graphical summary ===
S SD M V C KD MP L

=== 2026 ===
Polling execution			Parties										Blocs					
Polling firm	Fieldwork date	Sample size	Opposition				Government + Support				Oth.	Lead	Percentage		Lead	Seats (Note: According to a threshold rule, any one particular party must receive at least 4% of the votes to be allocated a seat in the Riksdag.)		Lead
Polling firm	Fieldwork date	Sample size	V	S	MP	C	L	M	KD	SD	Oth.	Lead	Red-Green (Note: Red-Green bloc is a term used in Swedish politics to describe the left-wing to centre-right bloc consisting of the Left Party (V), Social Democrats (S), Green Party (MP), and Centre Party (C).)	Tidö Parties (Note: Tidö Parties is a term used in Swedish politics to describe the centre-right to far-right bloc consisting of the Liberals (L), Moderates (M), Christian Democrats (KD), and Sweden Democrats (SD).)	Lead	Red-Green	Tidö Parties	Lead
2026 election	13 Sep 2026	–	8.4	28.0	6.1	7.0	5.3	19.9	6.2	17.5	1.6	8.1	49.6	48.8	0.8	176	173	3
Novus exitpoll	13 Sep	4,045	6.9	28.4	7.0	9.0	5.0	17.5	6.0	18.5	1.7	9.9	51.3	47.0	4.3	182	167	15
SVT/Valu exitpoll	13 Sep	13,709	8.0	28.4	7.4	7.5	5.4	18.1	6.1	17.2	1.9	11.2	51.3	46.8	4.5	183	166	17
Novus	9–11 Sep	5,928	6.6	28.6	6.4	9.2	4.7	18.1	5.5	19.5	1.4	9.1	50.8	47.8	3.0	180	169	11
Demoskop	7–11 Sep	1,419	7.5	29.7	5.6	7.7	4.7	16.7	7.6	19.0	1.5	10.7	50.5	48.0	2.5	179	170	9
Infostat	5–11 Sep	2,578	8.2	26.3	7.3	7.8	4.5	17.3	6.4	20.2	1.6	6.1	49.6	48.8	0.8	176	173	3
Ipsos	7–10 Sep	1,800	7.6	27.4	6.8	7.6	5.0	18.3	6.9	18.8	1.7	8.6	49.3	49.0	0.3	175	174	1
Verian	4–10 Sep	3,000	7.7	27.6	8.0	8.2	5.5	15.8	6.5	18.1	2.7	9.1	51.5	45.9	5.6	185	164	21
Indikator Opinion	2–10 Sep	5,642	7.8	28.6	6.9	6.9	5.4	16.8	7.1	18.3	1.4	10.3	50.8	47.6	3.2	180	169	11
Novus	6–8 Sep	2,292	7.5	26.6	8.8	7.8	5.8	16.6	6.4	19.3	1.2	7.3	50.7	48.1	2.6	179	170	9
Novus	1–5 Sep	2,888	7.8	27.0	7.8	7.7	4.3	17.9	6.0	19.7	1.8	7.3	50.3	47.9	2.4	179	170	9
Indikator Opinion	18 Aug–4 Sep	5,618	9.3	27.9	6.8	7.3	2.2	18.4	6.6	19.3	2.2	8.6	51.3	46.5	4.8	188	161	27
Verian	20 Aug–2 Sep	3,068	8.1	29.2	8.0	7.4	3.0	16.4	6.3	18.9	2.8	10.3	52.7	44.6	8.1	190	159	31
Demoskop	25 Aug–1 Sep	1,998	7.9	27.2	6.9	8.6	2.8	16.6	7.9	20.0	2.1	7.2	50.6	47.3	3.3	185	164	21
Infostat	25 Aug–1 Sep	1,590	8.7	27.2	7.5	7.5	2.5	17.5	5.8	20.2	3.1	7.0	51.5	46.0	5.5	188	161	27
Novus	24–30 Aug	2,984	8.4	25.8	7.8	8.3	3.3	17.2	6.5	20.7	2.0	5.1	50.3	47.7	2.6	186	163	23
Demoskop	13–24 Aug	2,117	6.8	30.4	6.8	7.7	2.0	17.2	8.5	18.3	2.3	12.1	51.7	45.9	5.8	188	161	27
Indikator	6–23 Aug	4,296	7.6	31.3	6.5	5.9	2.2	18.9	5.8	19.7	1.9	11.6	51.3	46.6	4.7	187	162	25
Verian	3–16 Aug	3,043	7.7	30.5	7.7	8.0	1.9	17.3	6.2	18.5	2.3	12.0	53.9	43.9	10.0	198	151	47
Novus	3–16 Aug	5,617	7.4	30.1	7.9	7.9	1.9	18.3	6.3	19.1	1.1	11.0	53.3	45.6	7.7	192	157	35
Verian	3–16 Aug	3,043	7.7	30.5	7.7	8.0	1.9	17.3	6.2	18.5	2.3	12.0	53.9	43.9	10.0	198	151	47
Demoskop	29 Jul–10 Aug	2,016	6.5	30.2	6.6	7.3	2.4	16.8	7.5	20.2	2.7	10.0	50.6	46.9	3.7	186	163	23
Novus	6–19 Jul	5,726	7.8	31.8	7.2	6.6	1.8	17.3	6.1	20.4	1.0	11.4	53.4	45.6	7.8	192	157	35
Indikator Opinion	1–26 Jun	1,751	7.8	32.5	6.3	7.0	1.7	17.7	6.1	19.2	1.7	13.3	53.6	44.7	8.9	194	155	39
Demoskop	5–17 Jun	2,016	7.6	31.3	7.6	6.2	2.9	16.3	6.5	19.3	2.2	12.0	52.7	45.0	7.7	194	155	39
Novus	1–14 Jun	5,962	8.9	32.6	6.4	6.1	2.2	16.6	5.6	20.0	1.6	12.6	54.0	44.4	9.6	196	153	43
Verian	25 May–7 Jun	3,011	8.7	31.6	7.8	5.4	2.0	17.1	6.0	18.9	2.6	12.7	53.4	44.0	9.4	196	153	43
SCB	28 Apr–28 May	4,542	8.6	33.9	6.6	6.1	2.5	17.3	4.5	18.3	2.0	15.6	55.2	42.6	12.6	202	147	55
Ipsos	12–25 May	1,686	8.0	32.0	6.0	6.0	2.0	19.0	5.0	20.0	2.0	12.0	52.0	46.0	6.0	189	160	29
Demoskop	17–24 May	2,081	7.6	31.9	8.1	6.0	3.1	16.7	5.7	19.0	1.9	12.9	53.6	44.5	9.1	197	152	45
Indikator Opinion	4–24 May	4,586	7.8	33.7	6.1	6.3	2.0	17.5	4.3	20.4	1.9	13.3	53.9	44.2	9.7	195	154	41
Novus	4–17 May	5,527	8.8	30.9	7.1	6.0	2.4	18.2	5.6	19.2	1.8	11.7	52.8	45.4	7.4	193	156	37
Verian	27 Apr–10 May	2,991	7.9	32.5	7.9	5.5	2.0	17.2	5.1	18.9	3.0	13.6	53.8	43.2	10.6	198	151	47
Ipsos	14–27 Apr	1,603	9.0	32.0	7.0	6.0	2.0	19.0	5.0	19.0	1.0	13.0	54.0	45.0	9.0	194	155	39
Demoskop	10–27 Apr	2,701	7.1	33.2	7.2	5.9	4.0	16.5	4.8	19.9	1.4	13.3	53.4	45.2	8.2	190	159	31
Indikator Opinion	1–27 Apr	4,584	7.2	33.6	5.7	6.4	2.4	18.3	5.0	19.4	2.0	14.2	52.9	45.1	7.8	193	156	37
Novus	6–19 Apr	5,897	7.6	32.4	6.1	6.6	2.9	18.4	4.8	19.8	1.4	12.6	52.7	45.9	6.8	192	157	35
Verian	23 Mar–5 Apr	3,009	7.7	32.7	6.1	6.8	2.2	16.8	5.7	20.0	2.0	12.7	53.3	44.7	8.6	194	155	39
Indikator Opinion	5–29 Mar	1,831	7.0	33.4	5.7	5.7	2.2	18.4	4.6	20.6	2.4	12.8	51.8	45.8	6.0	190	159	31
Demoskop	10–19 Mar	—N/a	7.5	31.1	6.6	5.9	4.5	17.3	5.0	19.9	2.2	11.2	51.1	46.7	4.4	182	167	15
Ipsos	10–22 Mar	1,739	9.0	33.0	6.0	6.0	2.0	18.0	4.0	20.0	2.0	13.0	54.0	44.0	10.0	197	152	45
Novus	14–18 Mar	2,188	7.5	32.7	5.7	6.3	2.3	17.5	5.1	21.0	1.9	11.7	52.2	45.9	6.3	190	159	31
Verian	23 Feb–8 Mar	3,226	7.7	32.4	6.5	5.9	2.1	17.0	5.3	21.1	2.0	11.3	52.5	45.5	7.0	191	158	33
Demoskop	10–24 Feb	—N/a	6.8	33.3	6.3	5.5	2.5	17.2	5.3	21.2	1.9	12.1	51.9	46.2	6.7	189	160	29
Ipsos	10–23 Feb	1,847	9.0	33.0	6.0	6.0	2.0	17.0	4.0	20.0	3.0	13.0	54.0	43.0	11.0	198	151	47
Indikator Opinion	2–23 Feb	1,736	8.0	35.0	5.0	5.0	1.0	19.0	4.0	21.0	2.0	14.0	53.0	45.0	8.0	191	158	33
Novus	2–15 Feb	2,708	7.4	34.6	5.1	5.2	2.1	17.5	3.8	22.9	1.4	11.7	52.3	46.3	7.0	197	152	45
Verian	26 Jan–8 Feb	3,225	7.4	34.4	6.0	4.6	2.0	18.2	5.6	20.1	1.7	14.3	52.4	45.9	6.5	190	159	31
Ipsos	20–29 Jan	1,868	8.0	34.0	6.0	5.0	2.0	18.0	4.0	21.0	2.0	13.0	53.0	45.0	8.0	193	156	37
Demoskop	16–26 Jan	2,134	7.4	33.1	6.1	4.5	2.6	17.8	5.4	20.8	2.3	12.3	51.1	46.6	4.5	187	162	25
Indikator Opinion	11–25 Jan	4,349	7.5	35.4	4.7	5.3	1.4	18.9	3.9	21.4	1.5	14.0	52.9	45.6	7.3	198	151	47
Novus	7–18 Jan	2,599	6.9	34.2	5.5	4.8	2.4	17.5	4.3	22.5	1.9	11.7	51.4	46.7	4.7	187	162	25

=== 2025 ===
Polling execution			Parties										Blocs					
Polling firm	Fieldwork date	Sample size	Opposition				Government + Support				Oth.	Lead	Percentage		Lead	Seats		Lead
Polling firm	Fieldwork date	Sample size	V	S	MP	C	L	M	KD	SD	Oth.	Lead	Red-Green	Tidö Parties	Lead	Red-Green	Tidö Parties	Lead
Indikator	3–29 Dec	2,753	7.1	35.2	6.4	3.8	2.1	18.4	3.9	21.4	1.7	13.8	52.5	45.8	6.7	192	157	35
Demoskop	7–16 Dec	2,163	6.7	33.6	6.2	5.4	2.0	16.8	4.8	21.5	3.0	12.1	51.0	45.1	5.9	191	158	33
Ipsos	2–14 Dec	1,811	8.0	34.0	6.0	4.0	2.0	18.0	4.0	22.0	2.0	12.0	52.0	46.0	6.0	189	160	29
Novus	1–14 Dec	2,527	6.2	34.1	5.1	4.9	2.4	17.6	3.9	23.7	2.1	10.4	50.3	47.6	2.7	192	157	34
Verian	24 Nov–7 Dec	3,233	6.8	34.7	6.1	4.7	2.3	17.3	5.0	20.4	2.6	14.3	52.3	45.1	7.3	192	157	34
Demoskop	15–24 Nov	—N/a	6.7	33.1	6.4	5.0	2.4	18.2	4.7	21.4	2.1	11.7	51.2	46.7	4.5	187	162	25
Indikator	5–24 Nov	—N/a	6.2	36.3	5.2	4.3	2.2	18.1	5.4	20.3	2.0	16.0	52.0	46.0	6.0	190	159	31
Ipsos	4–17 Nov	1,755	8.0	36.0	6.0	5.0	2.0	17.0	4.0	21.0	1.0	15.0	55.0	44.0	11.0	199	150	49
Verian	27 Oct–9 Nov	3,233	7.4	33.8	6.9	4.9	2.2	18.5	4.0	20.0	2.2	13.8	53.0	44.7	8.3	193	156	37
Demoskop	18–27 Oct	1,966	7	32.6	7.4	5.1	2.3	18.4	4.1	21.6	1.5	11.0	52.1	46.4	5.5	188	161	27
Indikator	2–27 Oct	2,063	6.6	35.4	4.7	4.9	2.0	17.4	4.3	22.9	1.8	12.5	51.6	46.6	5.0	187	162	25
Ipsos	7–19 Oct	1,789	7.0	33	6.0	6.0	3.0	19.0	4.0	21.0	1.0	12.0	52.0	47.0	5.0	189	160	29
Novus	6–19 Oct	2,441	6.9	34.9	4.4	5.4	2.2	18.0	4.0	22.6	1.6	12.3	51.6	46.6	5.0	187	162	25
Verian	22 Sep–5 Oct	3,227	7.5	34.8	5.8	4.7	2.6	17.9	4.2	20.1	2.4	14.7	52.8	44.8	8.0	194	155	39
Demoskop	11–22 Sep	2,099	6.0	34.1	6.5	4.8	2.3	18.7	4.9	20.2	2.5	13.9	51.4	46.1	5.3	188	161	27
Novus	8–19 Sep	2,197	6.6	34.6	5.2	4.6	3.1	17.0	3.0	23.9	1.4	10.7	51.0	47.0	4.0	193	156	37
Indikator	18 Aug–8 Sep	2,086	7.2	36.0	6.3	4.9	2.1	18.0	3.2	21.0	1.3	15.0	54.4	44.3	10.1	203	146	57
Verian	25 Aug–7 Sep	3,237	7.1	34.2	5.9	5.2	2.3	18.1	4.1	20.8	2.3	13.4	52.4	45.4	7.0	192	157	35
Demoskop	14 Aug–25 Aug	2,071	6.3	33.5	7.3	4.6	2.7	17.9	4.3	20.7	2.7	13.2	51.7	45.6	6.1	191	158	33
Ipsos	12 Aug–24 Aug	1,630	7.0	34.0	5.0	5.0	4.0	17.0	5.0	20.0	3.0	14.0	51.0	46.0	5.0	184	165	19
Novus	11 Aug–24 Aug	2,212	8.6	34.1	4.9	5.0	3.0	17.6	3.9	21.0	1.9	13.1	52.6	45.5	7.1	201	148	53
Verian	4–17 Aug	3,236	7.0	33.9	6.3	5.4	2.8	18.3	3.5	20.5	2.3	13.4	52.6	45.1	7.5	200	149	51
Indikator	4–24 Jun	1,847	7.3	36.7	5.3	5.3	2.8	18.2	3.8	19.0	1.6	17.7	54.6	43.8	10.8	208	141	67
Novus	1–13 Jun	1,904	7.4	35.3	5.5	5.4	2.1	18.3	3.8	20.2	2.0	15.1	53.6	44.4	9.2	203	146	57
Verian	26 May–8 Jun	3,231	7.6	34.7	5.1	5.9	2.4	18.6	3.7	19.3	2.7	15.4	53.3	44.0	9.3	204	145	59
SCB	29 Apr–28 May	9,247	7.1	36.2	6.5	5.5	2.8	18.3	3.4	18.0	2.2	18.2	55.3	42.5	12.8	210	139	71
Demoskop	12–26 May	2,581	6.9	34.7	6.4	5.7	2.0	17.9	4.3	19.6	2.5	15.1	53.7	43.8	9.9	196	153	43
Indikator	2–25 May	2,840	7.7	36.0	5.6	5.8	2.7	17.4	3.3	20.0	1.5	16.0	55.1	43.4	11.7	208	141	67
Novus	5–18 May	2,016	7.5	34.5	5.0	6.5	2.6	18.5	2.9	20.4	2.1	14.1	53.5	44.4	9.1	202	147	55
Verian	21 Apr–4 May	3,234	7.6	35.6	5.7	4.8	2.8	18.1	4.4	18.9	2.1	16.7	53.7	44.2	9.5	197	152	45
Indikator	11–28 Apr	2,840	7.6	35.4	5.7	4.1	2.8	21.1	3.0	18.2	2.1	14.3	52.8	45.1	7.7	200	149	51
Demoskop	10–22 Apr	2,538	7.6	33.6	6.6	4.8	2.4	20.3	3.9	18.3	2.5	13.3	52.6	44.9	7.7	201	148	53
Ipsos	8–21 Apr	1,653	8.0	37.0	6.0	5.0	2.0	19.0	3.0	19.0	1.0	18.0	56.0	43.0	13.0	207	142	65
Novus	7–21 Apr	2,086	8.1	36.7	4.6	4.3	2.5	19.9	3.2	19.2	1.5	16.8	53.7	44.8	8.9	202	147	55
Verian	24 Mar–6 Apr	3,231	7.7	35.5	5.9	3.6	2.8	20.3	3.4	18.7	2.1	15.2	52.7	45.2	7.5	194	155	39
Demoskop	1–30 Mar	2,000	7.5	33.9	6.6	4.2	2.7	18.8	4.6	19.7	2.0	14.2	52.2	45.8	6.4	191	158	33
Novus	4–16 Mar	2,343	8.6	34.6	5.3	4.3	2.6	20.3	3.2	19.4	1.7	14.3	52.8	45.5	7.3	199	150	49
Ipsos	4–16 Mar	1,706	8.0	35.0	5.0	4.0	3.0	20.0	3.0	20.0	2.0	15.0	52.0	46.0	6.0	197	152	45
Verian	24 Feb–9 Mar	3,226	7.6	34.2	6.2	4.2	2.8	19.2	4.4	19.2	2.3	15.0	52.2	45.6	6.6	191	158	33
Indikator	3–25 Feb	6,889	7.8	36.3	5.6	4.5	3.2	18.9	2.7	19.6	1.4	16.7	54.2	44.4	9.8	204	145	59
Demoskop	9–24 Feb	2,454	8.0	32.8	6.6	5.1	2.8	19.7	4.0	19.2	1.8	13.1	52.5	45.7	6.4	192	157	35
Novus	10–21 Feb	2,097	6.9	35.4	5.8	4.2	3.0	19.4	3.0	20.5	1.8	14.9	52.3	45.9	6.4	198	151	47
Verian	27 Jan–9 Feb	3,235	7.4	33.7	6.2	3.8	2.5	19.7	4.1	20.9	1.7	12.8	51.0	47.2	3.8	179	170	9
Verian	30 Dec–12 Jan	3,235	7.2	33.7	6.1	4.6	2.9	19.3	4.0	20.3	2.0	13.4	51.6	46.5	5.1	197	152	45
Indikator	5 Dec–6 Jan	1,989	7.1	33.8	6.2	4.8	3.4	18.6	3.2	21.6	1.5	12.2	51.9	46.8	5.1	197	152	45

=== 2024 ===
Polling execution			Parties										Blocs					
Polling firm	Fieldwork date	Sample size	Opposition				Government + Support				Oth.	Lead	Percentage		Lead	Seats		Lead
Polling firm	Fieldwork date	Sample size	V	S	MP	C	L	M	KD	SD	Oth.	Lead	Red-Green	Tidö Parties	Lead	Red-Green	Tidö Parties	Lead
Demoskop	26 Oct–11 Nov	2,508	8.0	32.0	7.5	4.7	2.8	19.5	4.0	19.7	1.7	12.3	52.2	46.0	6.2	191	158	33
Verian	28 Oct–10 Nov	3,234	7.7	34.5	5.9	4.5	3.0	19.1	4.1	19.4	2.3	15.4	52.7	45.1	7.6	194	155	39
Indikator	26 Aug–22 Sep	2,544	7.8	33.5	6.8	5.0	3.4	19.7	3.5	19.2	1.1	13.8	53.1	45.8	7.3	201	148	53
Verian	26 Aug–8 Sep	3,176	8.7	33.0	6.0	5.0	3.2	20.3	3.2	18.7	2.0	12.7	52.6	45.4	7.2	201	148	53
Verian	29 Jul–11 Aug	3,180	8.1	32.7	6.1	4.9	2.9	20.0	3.6	19.9	1.9	12.7	51.8	46.4	5.4	197	152	45
2024 EP Election	9 Jun	4,196,419	11.1	24.8	13.9	7.3	4.4	17.5	5.7	13.2	2.2	7.3	57.0	40.8	16.2	12 (Note: Out of the 21 seats of the Swedish European Parliament delegation)	9	3
Indikator	5–26 Jun	2,098	9.9	31.0	7.2	5.3	3.7	19.2	3.7	18.6	1.4	11.8	53.4	45.2	8.2	204	145	59
Verian	3–16 Jun	3,170	8.5	32.7	5.6	5.4	3.3	19.1	4.6	18.9	2.1	13.6	52.2	45.9	6.3	192	157	35
Demoskop	2–11 Jun	2,584	9.1	33.0	5.8	4.3	2.6	18.3	3.4	21.3	2.1	11.7	52.2	45.5	6.7	198	151	47
SCB	2–30 May	4,400	8.2	35.0	5.2	4.5	3.2	19.8	2.8	19.5	1.8	15.2	52.9	45.3	7.6	200	149	51
Demoskop	29 Apr–14 May	2,455	7.9	35.1	5.0	4.2	2.3	19.3	3.6	21.0	1.7	14.1	52.2	46.2	6.0	197	152	45
Verian	22 Apr–5 May	3,186	7.8	34.3	5.1	4.3	3.6	18.9	3.5	20.2	2.3	14.1	51.5	46.2	5.3	198	151	47
Indikator	28 Mar–22 Apr	2,584	8.7	33.6	5.1	4.4	2.7	20.1	2.9	20.9	1.8	12.7	51.8	46.6	5.2	194	155	39
Novus	25 Mar–21 Apr	2,584	7.7	34.6	4.9	5.0	3.7	20.5	3.3	19.6	0.7	14.1	52.2	47.1	5.1	198	151	47
Demoskop for Aftonbladet	24 Mar–8 Apr	2,433	7.8	35.2	4.4	4.0	2.7	20.2	3.2	20.8	1.7	14.4	51.4	46.9	4.5	194	155	41
Verian	25 Mar–7 Apr	3,172	7.7	34.7	4.5	4.2	3.4	20.5	3.7	19.5	1.7	14.2	51.1	47.1	4.0	195	154	41
Novus	19 Feb–17 Mar	2,230	7.8	36.2	4.6	4.6	3.1	19.5	3.8	19.1	1.3	16.7	53.2	45.5	7.7	202	147	55
Verian	19 Feb–3 Mar	3,000	8.4	33.8	4.5	4.6	2.9	19.6	3.6	20.7	2.0	13.1	51.2	46.8	4.4	195	154	41
Novus	22 Jan–18 Feb	2,324	8.9	35.4	3.8	4.8	3.3	18.7	3.2	20.5	1.4	14.9	52.9	45.7	7.2	194	155	39
Demoskop for Aftonbladet	27 Jan–11 Feb	2,473	6.6	36.6	4.2	4.0	2.8	18.6	3.3	21.1	2.5	15.5	51.4	45.8	6.5	197	152	47
Verian	22 Jan–4 Feb	3,161	7.8	35.7	4.5	4.3	3.4	17.5	3.6	21.4	1.8	14.3	52.3	45.9	6.4	200	149	51
Indikator	5–29 Jan	2,479	8.2	36.6	4.5	4.5	3.1	17.3	3.2	21.1	1.5	15.5	53.8	44.7	9.1	204	145	59
Ipsos	16–28 Jan	1,646	9	34	4	5	3	18	4	21	2	13	51	47	4	191	158	33
SKOP (Archived)	21 Dec–22 Jan	1,014	7.2	33.4	4.2	4.4	5.0	18.6	3.0	23.3	0.9	10.1	49.2	49.9	0.7	179	170	9
Novus	22 Dec–21 Jan	2,999	7.8	35.4	4.4	5.1	3.1	18.5	3.6	21.1	1.0	14.3	52.7	46.3	6.4	199	150	49
Verian	25 Dec–7 Jan	3,179	7.0	35.9	4.7	4.0	3.3	17.2	3.8	22.5	1.6	14.0	51.6	46.8	4.8	197	152	45
Indikator	7 Dec–2 Jan	2,468	7.2	37.0	5.3	3.4	2.7	17.5	2.6	23.0	1.4	14.0	52.9	45.8	7.1	190	159	31

=== 2023 ===
Polling execution			Parties										Blocs					
Polling firm	Fieldwork date	Sample size	Opposition				Government + Support				Oth.	Lead	Percentage		Lead	Seats		Lead
Polling firm	Fieldwork date	Sample size	V	S	MP	C	L	M	KD	SD	Oth.	Lead	Red-Green	Tidö Parties	Lead	Red-Green	Tidö Parties	Lead
Ipsos	5–17 Dec	1,705	9	35	4	5	3	15	3	24	2	11.0	53.0	45.0	8.0	201	148	53
Verian	27 Nov–10 Dec	~3,000	7.8	35.7	4.4	4.3	2.7	17.0	3.6	22.5	2.0	13.2	52.2	45.8	6.4	199	150	49
Sentio	30 Nov–4 Dec	–	7.2	34.9	5.1	4.2	3.2	16.0	3.1	24.2	2.1	10.7	51.4	46.5	4.9	195	154	41
Indikator	3–27 Nov	6,922	7.3	38.3	4.3	3.8	3.2	16.2	2.7	22.6	1.6	15.7	53.7	44.7	9.0	196	153	43
Ipsos	13–26 Nov	–	8	36	5	4	3	16	4	21	3	15.0	53.0	44.0	9.0	198	151	47
Novus	16 Oct–12 Nov	2,755	7.7	37.8	4.2	4.2	2.7	17.4	2.8	22.1	1.1	15.7	53.9	45.0	8.9	201	148	53
Sentio	3–7 Nov	–	8.9	36.0	3.9	3.4	2.5	17.2	4.3	22.3	1.5	13.7	52.2	46.3	5.9	177	172	5
Verian (Archived)	16–29 Oct	3,073	7.3	37.6	4.7	3.7	3.0	17.4	3.5	21.2	1.7	16.4	53.6	45.1	8.5	196	153	43
Indikator	3–25 Oct	–	8.1	37.9	4.8	4.1	2.3	16.1	2.9	22.0	1.8	15.9	54.9	43.3	11.6	206	143	63
SKOP (Archived)	9–22 Oct	~1,000	7.0	35.2	4.4	5.0	3.7	19.7	3.2	20.6	1.4	14.6	51.6	47.2	4.4	196	153	43
Novus	18 Sep–15 Oct	–	7.4	37.8	4.4	4.8	2.7	18.2	2.6	20.7	1.4	17.1	54.4	44.2	12.2	204	145	59
Sentio	3–10 Oct	–	7.6	33.1	4.5	4.6	4.9	18.0	2.9	22.3	2.1	10.8	49.8	48.1	1.7	179	170	9
Kantar (Archived)	18 Sep–1 Oct	3,074	8.1	37.4	4.6	4.0	3.0	17.5	3.6	20.2	1.6	17.2	54.1	44.3	9.8	204	145	59
Novus	21 Aug–17 Sep	–	7.8	37.0	5.7	3.9	3.0	19.1	3.7	18.2	1.6	17.9	54.4	44.0	10.4	201	148	53
Sentio	7–12 Sep	–	8.6	37.2	4.2	3.8	2.8	17.3	4.1	20.8	1.2	16.4	53.8	45.0	8.8	189	160	29
Kantar	21 Aug–3 Sep	~3,000	7.6	37.6	4.3	3.9	3.0	19.0	3.1	19.7	1.8	14.9	53.4	44.8	8.6	196	153	43
Novus	7–20 Aug	3,391	7.8	38.4	4.8	4.6	3.3	19.0	3.6	17.3	1.2	19.4	55.6	43.2	12.4	211	138	73
Sentio	10–15 Aug	–	9.9	37.8	5.1	4.4	2.0	17.7	3.4	18.1	1.6	16.0	57.2	41.2	16.0	213	136	77
Kantar	17–30 Jul	3,077	7.6	38.0	4.8	4.3	3.2	19.2	3.2	18.1	1.6	18.8	54.7	43.7	11.0	207	142	65
Novus	26 Jun–16 Jul	4,688	7.2	37.0	4.3	4.5	2.8	20.0	3.3	18.9	2.0	17.0	53.0	45.0	8.0	201	148	53
Sentio	3–7 Jul	–	8.4	35.7	3.9	4.3	3.0	18.5	3.3	21.0	2.0	14.7	52.3	45.8	6.5	192	157	35
Demoskop	13–25 Jun	2,408	8.7	34.1	2.8	4.7	3.0	21.5	4.1	19.1	2.1	12.6	50.3	47.7	2.6	180	169	11
Novus	29 May–21 Jun	3,140	7.8	36.6	4.7	4.7	3.6	20.4	3.3	17.6	1.3	16.2	53.8	44.9	8.9	204	145	59
Sentio	15–19 Jun	–	8.2	36.6	2.9	5.0	3.4	17.7	3.6	21.0	1.5	15.6	52.7	45.7	7.0	196	153	43
Ipsos	5–18 Jun	1,607	8.0	37.4	4.0	4.5	4.1	19.2	3.5	17.1	2.1	18.2	54.0	44.0	10.0	200	149	51
Demoskop	25 May–7 Jun	2,395	8.1	34.5	3.3	4.9	3.2	21.2	4.0	18.9	1.9	13.3	50.8	47.3	3.5	181	168	13
Sifo	22 May–4 Jun	3,078	7.8	36.1	4.1	4.4	3.5	20.2	3.6	19.2	1.1	15.9	52.4	46.5	5.9	199	150	49
SCB	27 Apr–24 May	9,261	7.3	38.6	4.1	4.2	3.4	19.1	3.7	18.0	1.7	19.5	54.2	44.2	10.0	207	142	65
Ipsos	9–21 May	1,676	8.9	36.8	4.0	4.7	3.4	17.5	3.6	18.6	2.0	18.2	54.4	43.1	10.3	209	140	69
Sifo	1–11 May	5,385	8.2	36.3	4.3	4.3	2.8	20.0	4.0	18.3	1.8	16.3	53.1	45.1	8.0	194	155	39
Sentio	4–10 May	–	7.9	38.3	4.5	3.3	3.5	16.2	3.3	21.6	2.0	16.7	54.0	44.0	10.0	200	149	51
Novus	3–30 Apr	3,243	7.5	38.4	4.7	4.4	3.2	20.2	3.7	16.4	1.5	18.2	55.0	43.5	11.5	210	139	71
Demoskop	14–24 Apr	2,202	8.0	35.3	3.1	4.9	3.3	20.6	4.0	18.9	2.0	14.7	51.3	46.8	4.5	184	165	19
Ipsos	11–23 Apr	1,588	9.2	35.5	4.4	4.9	3.6	19.1	3.3	17.8	2.2	16.4	54.0	43.8	10.2	207	142	65
Sifo	3–13 Apr	3,671	7.1	36.9	4.5	4.3	3.3	19.6	3.8	18.8	1.7	17.3	52.8	45.5	9.7	201	148	53
Sentio	6–12 Apr	–	6.3	37.7	4.5	3.4	3.3	19.4	3.5	19.8	2.2	17.9	51.9	46.0	9.7	193	156	67
Demoskop	24 Mar–3 Apr	2,026	7.9	35.3	2.9	4.7	3.5	21.8	3.9	18.6	1.4	13.5	50.8	47.8	3.0	189	160	29
Novus	27 Feb–2 Apr	3,514	7.7	37.6	4.3	4.6	3.6	19.9	3.5	17.5	1.3	17.7	54.2	44.5	9.7	208	141	67
Ipsos	14–26 Mar	1,719	8.1	36.9	4.5	4.7	3.1	18.9	4.1	17.6	2.1	18.0	54.2	43.7	10.5	200	149	51
Sifo	6–16 Mar	5,222	7.8	37.0	3.9	3.8	3.5	19.4	4.3	18.6	1.7	17.6	52.5	45.8	7.1	179	170	9
Sentio	9–15 Mar	–	7.9	35.7	5.0	4.0	3.7	18.8	5.0	18.8	1.0	16.9	52.6	46.3	6.3	193	156	37
Demoskop	24 Feb–6 Mar	2,135	8.2	34.3	2.8	4.4	3.5	21.7	4.4	19.0	1.7	12.6	49.7	48.6	1.1	178	171	8
Ipsos	14–26 Feb	1,692	7.3	36.1	3.7	5.3	3.2	19.7	3.9	18.9	2.0	16.4	52.4	45.7	6.7	197	152	35
Novus	30 Jan–26 Feb	3,370	6.7	38.2	4.4	4.9	3.5	20.2	3.6	17.3	1.2	18.0	54.2	44.6	9.6	206	143	63
Sifo	6–16 Feb	6,363	7.5	36.5	4.3	4.3	3.5	19.3	4.3	18.4	1.7	17.2	52.6	45.5	7.1	194	155	39
Sentio	9–15 Feb	–	8.4	34.1	5.8	3.7	3.6	17.9	4.9	20.4	1.2	13.7	52.0	46.8	5.2	184	165	19
Demoskop	27 Jan–6 Feb	2,103	7.9	34.0	3.2	5.5	3.1	21.1	4.0	18.6	2.5	12.9	50.6	46.8	3.8	182	167	15
Novus	2–29 Jan	3,539	7.4	37.1	5.0	5.0	3.0	19.7	4.3	16.9	1.6	16.4	54.5	43.9	10.6	199	150	49
Ipsos	17–29 Jan	1,659	7.5	37.3	4.0	5.1	3.9	18.0	4.1	18.1	2.0	19.2	53.9	44.1	9.8	200	149	51
Sifo	9–19 Jan	3,941	7.8	36.1	4.4	5.2	3.3	18.4	4.1	19.0	1.7	17.1	53.5	44.8	8.7	196	153	43
Demoskop	31 Dec 2022–9 Jan	2,181	8.8	32.7	2.4	6.0	3.4	20.8	4.2	19.8	1.9	11.9	49.9	48.2	1.7	179	170	9
Novus	28 Nov 2022–1 Jan	2,923	7.9	34.7	4.3	5.4	3.8	19.6	4.3	18.4	1.6	15.1	52.3	46.1	6.2	193	156	37

=== 2022 ===
Polling execution			Parties										Blocs					
Polling firm	Fieldwork date	Sample size	Opposition				Government + Support				Oth.	Lead	Percentage		Lead	Seats		Lead
Polling firm	Fieldwork date	Sample size	V	S	MP	C	L	M	KD	SD	Oth.	Lead	Red-Green	Tidö Parties	Lead	Red-Green	Tidö Parties	Lead
Ipsos	6–18 Dec	1,601	7.3	34.5	4.5	5.8	3.2	18.3	4.9	19.4	2.1	15.1	52.1	45.8	6.3	192	157	35
Sifo	5–15 Dec	–	7.3	36.1	4.4	5.9	3.5	18.2	4.3	18.8	1.5	17.3	53.7	44.8	8.9	198	151	47
Sentio	1–7 Dec	–	6.8	33.6	5.2	4.2	5.0	17.7	4.9	21.6	0.8	12.0	50.0	49.2	0.8	176	173	3
Demoskop	28 Nov–6 Dec	2,176	8.9	33.3	3.5	6.1	4.2	20.5	4.8	17.6	1.2	12.8	51.8	47.1	4.7	177	172	5
Ipsos	15–28 Nov	1,631	7.5	34.2	4.5	6.4	3.4	19.2	3.6	19.0	2.2	15.0	52.6	45.2	7.4	202	147	55
Novus	31 Oct–27 Nov	3,682	7.5	34.2	4.0	6.1	3.6	19.7	4.5	18.9	1.5	14.5	51.8	46.7	5.1	191	158	33
SCB	27 Oct–24 Nov	9,177	7.6	34.6	4.4	5.4	4.1	18.9	4.9	18.2	1.9	14.7	52.0	46.1	5.9	185	164	21
Sifo	7–17 Nov	4,838	8.2	33.4	5.0	5.5	3.6	20.1	4.8	17.7	1.7	13.3	52.1	46.2	5.9	192	157	35
Sentio	3–7 Nov	–	7.8	30.2	4.2	4.6	4.1	20.3	4.8	22.6	1.4	7.6	46.8	51.8	5.0	166	183	17
Demoskop	23 Oct–1 Nov	2,271	8.8	31.4	3.2	6.0	4.0	21.3	4.6	19.6	1.3	10.1	49.2	49.5	0.3	168	181	13
Novus	3–30 Oct	3,514	7.6	32.2	4.5	5.9	4.0	20.2	4.7	19.4	1.5	12.0	50.2	48.3	1.9	178	171	7
Ipsos	11–23 Oct	1,594	7.4	31.1	3.9	6.5	3.7	20.5	4.7	20.7	1.4	10.4	48.9	49.6	0.7	173	176	3
Sifo	3–13 Oct	6,054	7.4	31.8	4.5	5.8	4.5	19.6	5.0	19.8	1.6	12.0	49.5	48.9	0.6	176	173	3
Sentio	6–8 Oct	–	6.6	32.3	4.2	4.1	3.5	21.1	4.7	23.0	0.5	9.3	47.2	52.3	5.1	171	178	7
Demoskop	26 Sep–4 Oct	2,190	8.1	31.6	3.8	5.8	4.7	20.8	4.7	19.3	1.2	10.8	49.3	49.5	0.2	167	182	15
Novus	12 Sep–2 Oct	6,023	7.2	31.1	5.0	5.7	4.1	19.6	4.9	20.8	1.6	10.3	49.0	49.4	0.4	174	175	1
Ipsos	13–25 Sep	–	6.8	31.7	4.6	6.6	4.6	18.9	4.8	20.2	1.7	11.5	49.7	48.6	1.1	177	172	5
2022 election	11 Sep 2022	–	6.8	30.3	5.1	6.7	4.6	19.1	5.3	20.5	1.6	9.8	48.9	49.6	0.7	173	176	3

== Regional polling ==
Opinion polls for the general election in Sweden's regions and municipalities.

=== Stockholm municipality ===
==== Vote share in general election ====
Polling firm	Fieldwork date	Sample size	V	S	MP	C	L	M	KD	SD	Oth.	Lead
2026 election	13 Sep 2026	–	13.0	26.3	11.2	9.8	7.1	19.1	3.9	8.3	1.2	7.2
SCB	May 2023	–	9.8	44.0	6.8	4.0	3.8	16.7	2.0	11.8	1.1	27.3
SCB	Nov 2022	–	12.1	33.8	8.2	7.2	7.0	16.4	2.7	10.6	2.0	17.2
2022 election	11 Sep 2022	–	11.7	28.1	10.0	8.5	6.9	19.1	3.2	10.7	1.9	7.0

=== Stockholm County ===
Excludes the Municipality of Stockholm.

==== Vote share in general election ====
Polling firm	Fieldwork date	Sample size	V	S	MP	C	L	M	KD	SD	Oth.	Lead
2026 election	13 Sep 2026	–	8.1	25.8	5.7	7.8	6.6	23.8	5.7	14.9	0.79	2.0
SCB	May 2023	–	6.6	34.5	3.0	4.1	5.2	27.3	3.1	14.7	1.5	7.2
SCB	Nov 2022	–	5.4	34.8	4.0	5.1	5.3	25.1	4.1	14.6	1.6	9.7
2022 election	11 Sep 2022	–	6.3	27.1	5.1	7.4	6.0	24.0	4.9	17.6	1.8	3.1

=== Western Sweden ===
Includes the counties of Västra Götaland and Halland

==== Vote share in general election ====
Polling firm	Fieldwork date	Sample size	V	S	MP	C	L	M	KD	SD	Oth.	Lead
SCB	May 2023	–	7.2	35.5	5.1	4.2	3.7	20.1	3.7	18.0	2.6	14.4
SCB	Nov 2022	–	9.0	32.0	4.1	3.7	3.7	18.8	5.8	20.3	2.7	11.7
2022 election	11 Sep 2022	–	7.0	29.1	5.0	6.4	4.7	19.5	5.9	20.9	1.5	8.2

=== Southern Sweden ===
Includes the counties of Skåne and Blekinge

==== Vote share in general election ====
Polling firm	Fieldwork date	Sample size	V	S	MP	C	L	M	KD	SD	Oth.	Lead
SCB	May 2023	–	9.0	38.6	3.6	3.0	3.6	18.0	2.7	20.1	–	17.5
SCB	Nov 2022	–	6.4	36.4	3.0	4.6	4.3	21.7	3.8	18.3	–	14.7
2022 election	11 Sep 2022	–	6.1	27.2	4.7	5.5	4.7	19.8	4.8	25.5	1.7	1.7

=== Southeastern Sweden ===
Includes the counties of Kalmar, Kronoberg, Jönköping and the island of Gotland

==== Vote share in general election ====
Polling firm	Fieldwork date	Sample size	V	S	MP	C	L	M	KD	SD	Oth.	Lead
SCB	Nov 2022	–	4.9	31.3	3.9	6.8	4.3	19.4	8.1	19.4	1.8	11.9
2022 election	11 Sep 2022	–	4.6	30.7	3.6	7.2	3.4	18.5	7.7	23.1	1.8	7.6

=== Eastern Central Sweden ===
Includes the counties of Södermanland, Uppsala, Västmanland, Örebro and Östergötland

==== Vote share in general election ====
Polling firm	Fieldwork date	Sample size	V	S	MP	C	L	M	KD	SD	Oth.	Lead
SCB	Nov 2022	–	9.4	33.8	4.6	6.7	3.1	17.7	4.5	18.2	1.8	11.9
2022 election	11 Sep 2022	–	6.3	31.3	4.7	6.4	4.4	18.7	5.5	21.4	1.3	9.9

=== Northern Central Sweden ===
Includes the counties of Dalarna, Gävleborg and Värmland

==== Vote share in general election ====
Polling firm	Fieldwork date	Sample size	V	S	MP	C	L	M	KD	SD	Oth.	Lead
SCB	Nov 2022	–	5.9	39.4	4.3	4.4	2.7	15.4	5.0	21.6	–	17.8
2022 election	11 Sep 2022	–	5.4	33.6	3.6	6.4	3.3	16.6	5.6	24.2	1.3	9.4

=== Northern Sweden ===
Norrland - Northern Sweden, Includes the counties of Jämtland, Norrbotten, Västerbotten and Västernorrland

==== Vote share in general election ====
Polling firm	Fieldwork date	Sample size	V	S	MP	C	L	M	KD	SD	Oth.	Lead
SCB	Nov 2022	–	6.0	38.4	4.6	6.2	2.8	13.3	6.0	21.3	1.5	17.1
2022 election	11 Sep 2022	–	6.9	40.0	4.3	7.2	2.8	14.0	5.1	18.6	1.1	21.4

== Voting by groups ==
=== Vote share by gender ===
Polling firm	Fieldwork date	Sample size	M	W	M	W	M	W	M	W	M	W	M	W	M	W	M	W	Oth.
Polling firm	Fieldwork date	Sample size	V		S		MP		C		L		M		KD		SD		Oth.
Sifo	22 May–4 Jun 2023	3,078	6.2	9.6	32.3	40.1	3.1	5.1	4.0	4.8	4.0	3.0	21.1	19.1	3.7	3.4	23.7	14.5	1.2
Novus	3–30 Apr 2023	3,323	5.6	9.5	30.9	46.1	3.0	6.4	3.9	4.7	3.9	2.5	21.9	18.4	3.9	3.6	24.6	7.9	1.5
Novus	27 Feb–2 Apr 2023	3,514	5.8	9.6	31.8	43.6	2.9	5.6	4.0	5.3	3.6	3.5	22.1	17.6	3.8	3.3	24.1	10.9	1.3
Novus	30 Jan–26 Feb 2023	3,370	4.7	8.7	32.3	44.3	3.6	5.2	4.3	5.6	3.7	3.3	22.0	18.3	3.9	3.3	23.7	10.8	1.2
Novus	2–29 Jan 2023	3,539	6.0	8.8	30.8	43.4	3.1	6.8	4.3	5.7	3.2	2.9	20.9	18.5	5.2	3.5	23.7	10.0	1.6
Novus	28 Nov 2022–1 Jan 2023	2,923	6.1	9.7	28.6	40.9	3.3	5.3	3.9	7.0	3.7	3.9	23.8	15.3	3.8	4.7	24.3	12.4	1.6
Novus	31 Oct–27 Nov 2022	3,682	5.1	10.0	28.9	39.5	2.5	5.5	5.2	6.9	4.4	2.8	21.5	17.8	4.2	4.9	26.4	11.3	1.5
SCB	27 Oct–24 Nov 2022	9,177	7.6	7.6	29.0	40.2	3.3	5.5	4.3	6.5	4.6	3.6	20.9	16.9	4.6	5.3	23.0	13.4	1.9
Novus	3–30 Oct 2022	3,514	6.4	8.8	28.0	36.4	3.4	5.5	4.9	6.9	3.9	4.2	22.1	18.4	4.4	5.0	25.1	13.6	1.5
Novus	12 Sep–2 Oct 2022	6,023	5.6	8.7	23.5	38.7	3.4	6.6	4.6	6.8	5.2	3.1	22.2	16.9	5.3	4.5	28.1	13.5	1.6
2022 election	11 Sep 2022	–	6.8		30.3		5.1		6.7		4.6		19.1		5.3		20.5		1.5

=== Vote share by gender and age ===
Polling firm	Fieldwork date	Sample size	Age groups	Gender	V	S	MP	C	L	M	KD	SD	Oth.	Lead
SCB	27 Oct–24 Nov 2022	274	18–29	Male	7.9	19.5	3.9	2.7	6.0	32.2	5.0	17.8	5.0	12.7
SCB	27 Oct–24 Nov 2022	249	18–29	Female	18.6	27.7	8.2	11.0	4.4	14.1	7.3	7.5	1.6	9.1
SCB	27 Oct–24 Nov 2022	523	18–29	Total	12.9	23.3	5.9	6.6	5.3	23.7	6.1	13.0	3.3	0.4
SCB	27 Oct–24 Nov 2022	630	30–49	Male	12.4	23.6	5.7	4.0	4.6	23.3	4.5	18.9	3.1	0.3
SCB	27 Oct–24 Nov 2022	593	30–49	Female	9.8	32.0	9.0	6.5	5.9	20.9	5.7	9.7	0.7	11.1
SCB	27 Oct–24 Nov 2022	1,223	30–49	Total	11.1	27.8	7.3	5.2	5.3	22.1	5.1	14.3	1.9	5.7
SCB	27 Oct–24 Nov 2022	580	50–64	Male	4.6	29.3	2.2	3.8	5.0	19.4	4.4	29.5	1.8	0.2
SCB	27 Oct–24 Nov 2022	504	50–64	Female	6.5	36.1	3.6	6.5	4.7	18.0	5.3	19.2	0.0	17.1
SCB	27 Oct–24 Nov 2022	1,084	50–64	Total	5.5	32.5	2.9	5.1	4.9	18.7	4.9	24.6	1.0	7.9
SCB	27 Oct–24 Nov 2022	625	65+	Male	4.2	38.3	1.7	5.4	4.0	17.2	4.5	23.7	1.1	14.6
SCB	27 Oct–24 Nov 2022	615	65+	Female	4.9	49.1	2.6	4.6	4.3	12.5	4.3	16.7	1.1	32.4
SCB	27 Oct–24 Nov 2022	1,240	65+	Total	4.6	44.0	2.2	5.0	4.1	14.7	4.4	19.9	1.1	24.1
2022 election	11 Sep 2022	–			6.8	30.3	5.1	6.7	4.6	19.1	5.3	20.5	1.7	9.8

=== Vote share by income level ===
Polling firm	Fieldwork date	Sample size	Income Percentile	V	S	MP	C	L	M	KD	SD	Oth.	Lead
SCB	27 Oct–24 Nov 2022	617	0–20% (Lowest income)	11.2	32.7	6.2	6.9	3.9	16.0	5.4	15.5	2.2	16.7
SCB	27 Oct–24 Nov 2022	634	20–40%	8.3	40.0	2.7	3.6	3.9	13.9	5.6	21.1	0.9	18.9
SCB	27 Oct–24 Nov 2022	748	40–60%	8.9	35.3	4.9	4.9	3.5	16.1	4.8	19.4	2.2	15.9
SCB	27 Oct–24 Nov 2022	837	60–80%	7.1	32.4	4.4	4.5	3.6	19.6	5.7	21.4	1.3	11.0
SCB	27 Oct–24 Nov 2022	1,101	80–100% (Highest income)	4.3	26.1	4.1	7.2	8.9	28.8	4.7	14.3	1.6	2.7
2018 election	9 Sep 2018	–		6.8	30.3	5.1	6.7	4.6	19.1	5.3	20.5	1.5	9.8

=== Vote share by living arrangement ===
Polling firm	Fieldwork date	Sample size	House type	V	S	MP	C	L	M	KD	SD	Oth.	Lead
SCB	27 Oct–24 Nov 2022	2,261	Own house	4.7	31.3	4.4	5.5	4.9	21.5	5.6	20.6	1.4	9.8
SCB	27 Oct–24 Nov 2022	814	Condominium	8.2	33.8	5.2	5.2	6.9	21.9	4.5	13.2	1.1	11.9
SCB	27 Oct–24 Nov 2022	908	Rental apartment	15.9	35.6	4.2	4.9	3.5	13.3	4.0	16.9	1.8	18.7
2018 election	9 Sep 2018	–		6.8	30.3	5.1	6.7	4.6	19.1	5.3	20.5	1.5	9.8

=== Vote share by ethnic background ===
Polling firm	Fieldwork date	Sample size	Ethnic background	Gender	V	S	MP	C	L	M	KD	SD	Oth.	Lead
SCB	27 Oct–24 Nov 2022	1,832	Swedish	Male	6.4	26.5	3.0	4.4	5.1	22.9	4.6	24.4	2.6	2.1
SCB	27 Oct–24 Nov 2022	1,688	Swedish	Female	7.5	36.2	5.8	7.1	5.1	17.3	5.9	14.5	0.5	18.9
SCB	27 Oct–24 Nov 2022	3,520	Swedish	Total	6.9	31.3	4.4	5.7	5.1	20.2	5.2	19.6	1.6	11.7
SCB	27 Oct–24 Nov 2022	277	Foreign	Male	13.6	37.1	5.9	2.3	2.9	18.3	4.5	12.8	2.4	18.8
SCB	27 Oct–24 Nov 2022	273	Foreign	Female	15.1	42.9	5.0	4.6	4.3	13.5	3.3	9.7	0.0	28.6
SCB	27 Oct–24 Nov 2022	550	Foreign	Total	14.5	40.2	5.4	3.5	3.7	15.8	3.9	11.2	1.2	24.3
2022 election	11 Sep 2022	–			6.8	30.3	5.1	6.7	4.6	19.1	5.3	20.5	1.7	9.8

== Leadership polling ==
=== Approval ratings ===
==== Graphical summary ====
View source data.
View source data.

==== Confidence ====
Polling firm	Fieldwork date	Sample size	Nooshi Dadgostar (V)	Magdalena Andersson (S)	Per Bolund (MP)	Märta Stenevi (MP)	Muharrem Demirok (C)	Annie Lööf (C)	Johan Pehrson (L)	Ulf Kristersson (M)	Ebba Busch (KD)	Jimmie Åkesson (SD)
Novus	15–20 Jun 2023	1,089	22	50	11	10	4	—N/a	13	33	21	26
Demoskop	13–19 Jun 2023	1,023	29	55	15	17	10	—N/a	19	37	27	36
Sifo	16–18 Jun 2023	1,102	24	52	13	12	4	—N/a	14	30	21	25
Demoskop	–	–	27	54	15	15	11	—N/a	16	36	27	34
Demoskop	27 Mar–4 Apr 2023	1,024	26	56	14	16	4	—N/a	19	36	26	36
Ipsos	14–26 Mar 2023	1,719	20	53	10	10	3	—N/a	12	31	19	26
Demoskop	28 Feb–7 Mar 2023	1,394	22	56	14	17	4	—N/a	20	40	29	36
Novus	9–15 Feb 2023	1,021	21	53	10	11	3	—N/a	11	32	22	26
Demoskop	1–7 Feb 2023	1,484	26	57	13	16	4	—N/a	19	38	31	34
Ipsos	Feb 2023	–	18	55	11	10	—N/a	30	13	32	21	28
Novus	5–10 Jan 2023	1,089	17	54	10	9	—N/a	26	12	29	20	27
Demoskop	27 Dec 2022–4 Jan 2023	1,666	22	58	15	14	—N/a	36	19	38	33	37
Demoskop	29 Nov–5 Dec 2022	1,530	28	55	17	16	—N/a	34	18	40	34	37
Demoskop	25 Oct–1 Nov 2022	1,471	25	57	16	18	—N/a	33	23	43	41	41
Sifo	28–31 Oct 2022	–	22	57	11	12	—N/a	29	19	38	30	30
Novus	20–26 Oct 2022	2,048	23	54	12	12	—N/a	29	14	37	30	32
Sifo	30 Sep–3 Oct 2022	1,009	22	61	11	12	—N/a	31	19	38	29	31

=== Preferred prime minister ===
Polling firm	Date	Magdalena Andersson (S)	Ulf Kristersson (M)	Jimmie Åkesson (SD)	Others
Indikator	Aug 2026	41%	23%	15%	22%
Indikator	Jun 2026	41%	24%	14%	21%
Indikator	May 2026	41%	24%	16%	18%
Indikator	Apr 2026	39%	24%	15%	22%
Indikator	Mar 2026	37%	21%	17%	25%
Indikator	Feb 2026	41%	20%	18%	21%
Indikator	Jan 2026	41%	21%	18%	20%
Indikator	Dec 2025	40%	18%	18%	24%
Indikator	Dec 2025	41%	18%	18%	22%
Indikator	Nov 2025	41%	19%	18%	22%
Indikator	Oct 2025	40%	20%	18%	22%
Indikator	Sep 2025	39%	18%	17%	26%
Indikator	Jun 2025	39%	21%	16%	23%
Indikator	May 2025	40%	19%	16%	25%
Indikator	Apr 2025	39%	21%	14%	27%
Indikator	Mar 2025	42%	21%	15%	22%
Indikator	Feb 2025	41%	21%	16%	22%
Indikator	Jan 2025	40%	20%	17%	23%
Indikator	Dec 2024	40%	21%	16%	23%
Indikator	Nov 2024	38%	20%	15%	27%
Indikator	Oct 2024	42%	22%	17%	20%
Indikator	Sep 2024	42%	21%	15%	23%
Indikator	Jun 2024	43%	21%	15%	21%
Indikator	May 2024	39%	19%	16%	26%
Indikator	Apr 2024	41%	22%	16%	22%
Indikator	Mar 2024	40%	21%	17%	22%
Indikator	Feb 2024	42%	18%	18%	22%
Indikator	Jan 2024	45%	18%	17%	21%
Indikator	Dec 2023	44%	18%	18%	20%
Indikator	Nov 2023	43%	17%	18%	22%
Indikator	Oct 2023	45%	17%	18%	20%
Indikator	Sep 2023	48%	22%	13%	27%

== Government approval rating ==
Polling firm	Fieldwork date	Sample size	Approve	Disapprove	Don't know	Lead
Ipsos	Mar 2023	–	17	55	28	38
Sifo	Feb 2023	1,044	36	56	8	20
Ipsos	Jan 2023	–	4	51	44	47
Demoskop	25–26 Jan 2023	1,290	31	53	16	22
Sifo	13–16 Jan 2023	1,017	32	59	9	27
Demoskop	12–19 Dec 2022	1,808	36	62	10	24
Ipsos	Dec 2022	–	6	49	45	43
Sifo	2–4 Dec 2022	1,214	33	57	10	24
Demoskop	Nov 2022	–	42	42	16	Tie
Ipsos	Nov 2022	–	10	43	48	33
Novus	Oct 2022	–	34	42	24	8

== Other polling ==
=== NATO membership ===
Polling firm	Fieldwork date	Sample size	For	Against	Don't know	Lead
SOM-Institute	Autumn 2022	26,250	64	14	22	50
SCB	27 Oct–24 Nov 2022	9,177	68	22	10	46
Ipsos	Dec 2022	–	60	19	21	41
Novus	19–24 Jan 2023	1,043	63	22	15	41
Demoskop	25–26 Jan 2023	1,290	70	17	14	53
SCB	27 Apr–25 May 2023	9,261	67.8	21.2	11.0	46.6
Sifo	May 2023	–	64	19	17	45

=== EU membership ===
Polling firm	Fieldwork date	Sample size	For	Against	Don't know	Lead
SOM-Institute	Autumn 2022	26,250	68	11	21	57
SCB	27 Oct–24 Nov 2022	9,177	60	14	26	46

=== Membership of the Eurozone ===
Regarding implementation of the euro as Sweden's official currency.

Pollster	Dates conducted	Sample size	Yes	No	Unsure
SCB	Nov 2022	4,070	23.2%	58.5%	18.3%
Eurobarometer	Apr 2023	1,039	54%	43%	2%
SCB	May 2023	4,334	30.6%	50.5%	18.9%
Eurobarometer	May 2024	1,038	55%	43%	2%
SCB	May 2024	4,427	34.4%	46.1%	19.5%
SOM	December 2024	?	32%	41%	27%
Eurobarometer	March 2025	1,027	54%	35%	11%
SCB	May 2025	4,595	32%	49.5%	18.5%
Eurobarometer	April 2026	1,000	51%	47%	2%
SCB	Apr–May 2026	4,542	28.7%	52.1%	19.2%

=== Nuclear energy ===
Polling firm	Fieldwork date	Sample size	For		Against		Don't know	Lead
Polling firm	Fieldwork date	Sample size	Build additional power plants (Note: Continue to use nuclear power and, if necessary, build new power plants.)	Replace existing power plants (Note: Continue to use the nuclear power plants that exist today, but build no new ones.)	Shut down existing power plants when their lifespan ends	Shut down existing power plants immediately (Note: Phase out nuclear power through political decisions.)	Don't know	Lead
SOM-Institute	Autumn 2022	26,250	32	24	28	4	12	24
Novus	27 Oct–2 Nov 2022	1,010	59	-	26	8	7	25

== See also ==
- Opinion polling for the 2018 Swedish general election
- Opinion polling for the 2022 Swedish general election
