= Ilan Sadé =

Swedish-Israeli politician and lawyer

- אילן שדה
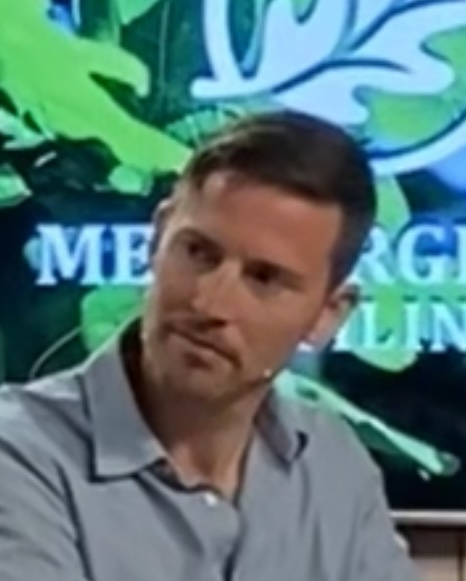

Leader of Citizens' Coalition
- Incumbent
- Assumed office 16 October 2016

Personal details
- Born: 26 August 1978 (age 48) Nahariya, Israel
- Party: Citizens' Coalition (since 2015); Independent (2012–2014)
- Other political affiliations: Centre Party (until 2011 or 2012)
- Education: Lund University (LL.M)
- Occupation: Writer, debater, and politician
- Profession: Lawyer
- Website: ilansade.com

Ilan Sadé (Swedish pronunciation: [ˈɪɭan sadeː]; Hebrew: אילן שדה; born 26 August 1978) is a Swedish lawyer, debater, and politician with former affiliations with the Centre Party. Since 2016 he has been the party leader for Citizens' Coalition. Sadé owns the online newspaper Nyheter Idag and the blog Ledarsidorna.

== Biography ==
Ilan Sadé moved to Sweden in 1980 together with his Israeli father and his Swedish mother. They moved to Skanör in Scania County. In 2004, he took the Candidate of Law exam at Lund University and since then he has worked as a business lawyer and debater. He now lives in Malmo.

=== Political activity ===
From 2003 until 2016 Sadé was the chairman of the Centre Party's student wing Centerstudenter as well as being the editor of Tidskriften Rådslag from 2004 until 2006. During the 2006 Swedish general election, he was in second place on the ballot for the Centre Party's regional council election for the constituency of Malmö. He has also been the chairman of the environmental committee in Lund Municipality from 2017 until 2009. After several articles on the forum TV4 Newsmill in 2011 and 2012 criticizing the Centre Party's policies regarding immigration, education and the party's new ideologies, around 2011 or 2012 he stopped paying his membership fee resulting in him leaving the party.

After Sadé left the Center Party he decided to become an independent and not be aligned with any political party. After the 2014 Swedish general election and in the aftermath of the December Agreement Sadé joined Bourgeois Future. He believed that the political parties in the Riksdag had a condescending view upon their voters and were not representing them, viewing how nobody was interacting with the Sweden Democrats. Sadé saw two alternatives he could join; either the Sweden Democrats or the newly formed Bourgeois Future whom he knew the leader. A couple of weeks after the December Agreement, he joined Bourgeois Future. Since October 2016 he has been the leader of Citizens' Coalition.

Sadé owns the company Publicism NITEK AB which owns the online newspaper Nyheter Idag.

== Personal life ==
Sadé moved to Tel Aviv for one year where he wrote his book. Sadé is openly gay.

== Bibliography ==
=== Books ===
Sadé, Ilan (2014). Frommare kan ingen vara : texter om blågul renlärighet och ett land på glid. Tel Aviv: Mummelförlaget. ISBN 978-9-198-14217-4. OCLC 941463478.

Party political offices
Preceded by	Leader of the Citizens' Coalition; 2016–present	Incumbent
