= Citizens' Coalition =

Political party in Sweden

Citizens' Coalition Medborgerlig Samling
- Abbreviation: MED
- Chairman: Mikael Flink
- Secretary: Monika Råberg Hellsing
- Founded: 2014
- Membership (2022): 4,000
- Ideology: Libertarian conservatism; Liberal conservatism; Green conservatism; Economic liberalism; Anti-immigration; Euroscepticism
- Political position: Right-wing
- Colours: Blue Green
- Riksdag: 0 / 349
- European Parliament: 0 / 20
- County councils: 0 / 1,597
- Municipal councils: 11 / 12,780

Website
- med.se

Historical membership in 1-year intervals, 2017–Present
Year	Pop.	±%
2017	1,000	—
2018	1,800	+80.0%
source		—

Citizens' Coalition (Swedish: Medborgerlig Samling, MED), officially known as Bourgeois Future (Swedish: Borgerlig Framtid, BF) until 2017, is a right-wing political party in Sweden that was founded in 2014. The party considers itself liberal-conservative and green conservative, while observers described it as a right-wing party critical of immigration and conservative.

Citizens' Coalition received 0,18 % of the vote in the 2022 Swedish general election, making it the third largest party with no seats in the Riksdag, behind the Nuance Party and Alternative for Sweden. The party received 0.15% of the votes in the EU parliament election 2019. As of the 2022 Swedish municipal elections, the party holds eleven seats total in five municipal assemblies: Höör, Laholm, Karlshamn, Järfälla and Österåker.

== History ==
The party was founded in 2014, initially as Borgerlig Framtid (Bourgeois Future) by the cook and nutrition consultant Patrik Evaeus, accountant Tomas Evaeus and journalist Anders Königsson. The party name was later changed to Medborgerlig Samling (Citizens' Coalition), abbreviated as MED, at an extra general meeting during the fall of 2016. The name change was prompted by a falling out between Königsson, then party leader, and the party's board, leading to Königsson leaving the party to set up a new party, re-using the party name Borgerlig Framtid. At the same general meeting, Ilan Sadé was elected new chairman and party leader.

The party name Medborgerlig Samling was first registered with the Swedish Election Authority, in 2017.

The party had, in the 2018 Swedish general election, won four seats in municipal councils in Sweden: two in Laholm and one each in Höör, and Torsås. However, in the aftermath of the 2022 Swedish general election, Citizens' Coalition lost its seat in Torsås, but gained a seat in Höör and won two more seats in Laholm. The party did also win five new seats in three other municipalities: Karlshamn and Järfälla, where they gained two seats in each municipality, and Österåker, one seat.

== Ideology and political positions ==
Citizens' Coalition declares itself to be a liberal-conservative political party and favors a liberal economic policy as well as a conservative view of society and culture.

The party policy includes a liberal financial policy, a strengthened emphasis on the individual's own responsibilities, as well as rights, and it has a conservative view on society and culture. The party promotes stronger national defense, including seeking NATO membership, added resources to the police and justice system and expanded individual rights to self defence; including a stand your ground law. The party also wants to manage Sweden's Nordic model welfare system by greatly reducing asylum and refugee immigration, calling for the stronger integration of immigrants, abolishing state taxes on income and raising the standard tax deduction to SEK 100 000 per year.

During the 2019 European parliament election, Citizens' Coalition pushed their vision of a drastically smaller EU limited to trade, environmental regulation and security with less EU political interference over member states. Since 2018 the party has repeatedly highlighted the need for focus on the core services of the government, and pushing for a drastically smaller government and democratic renewal – in particular removing party subsidies and increased personal responsibility for politicians and government employees. At a party meeting in November 2020, a motion was adopted to oppose the Next Generation EU recovery fund and that the party will demand a referendum on EU membership in 2023 should no exceptions be made for Sweden by Brussels regarding the fund.

The party is in favor of maintaining the Swedish monarchy; favoring a system similar to the monarchies of Denmark and the United Kingdom. Notably, the monarch serving a ceremonial role during a change of government.

== Controversies ==
=== Stockholm Pride ban ===
MED was banned from participating in the Stockholm Pride festival in 2018, with festival officials citing several reasons, among them a perceived "obvious difference" in the festival's and the party's views on transgender people. Officials pointed to hateful messages on the festival's social media pages, the party's lack of specific LGBT politics and an article written by Sadé they say is evidence of transphobic politics. Sadé, who is openly homosexual, denies the allegations made by Pride and stated that the exclusion was rather because Pride had been allegedly hijacked by "the Left's identity politics."

== Election results ==
=== Riksdag ===
Election	Votes	%	Seats	+/−	Government
2018	13,056	0.20 (#11)	0 / 349	New	No seats
2022	12,882	0.20 (#11)	0 / 349	0	No seats
2026	4,118	0.06 (#14)	0 / 349	0	No seats

=== European Parliament ===
Election	List leader	Votes	%	Seats	+/−	EP Group
2019	Unclear	6,363	0.15 (#12)	0 / 20	New	−
2024	Pia Rundkvist	12,699	0.30 (#12)	0 / 20	0	−
