= Åmänningen =

Lake in Fagersta Municipality, Sweden

- Lake
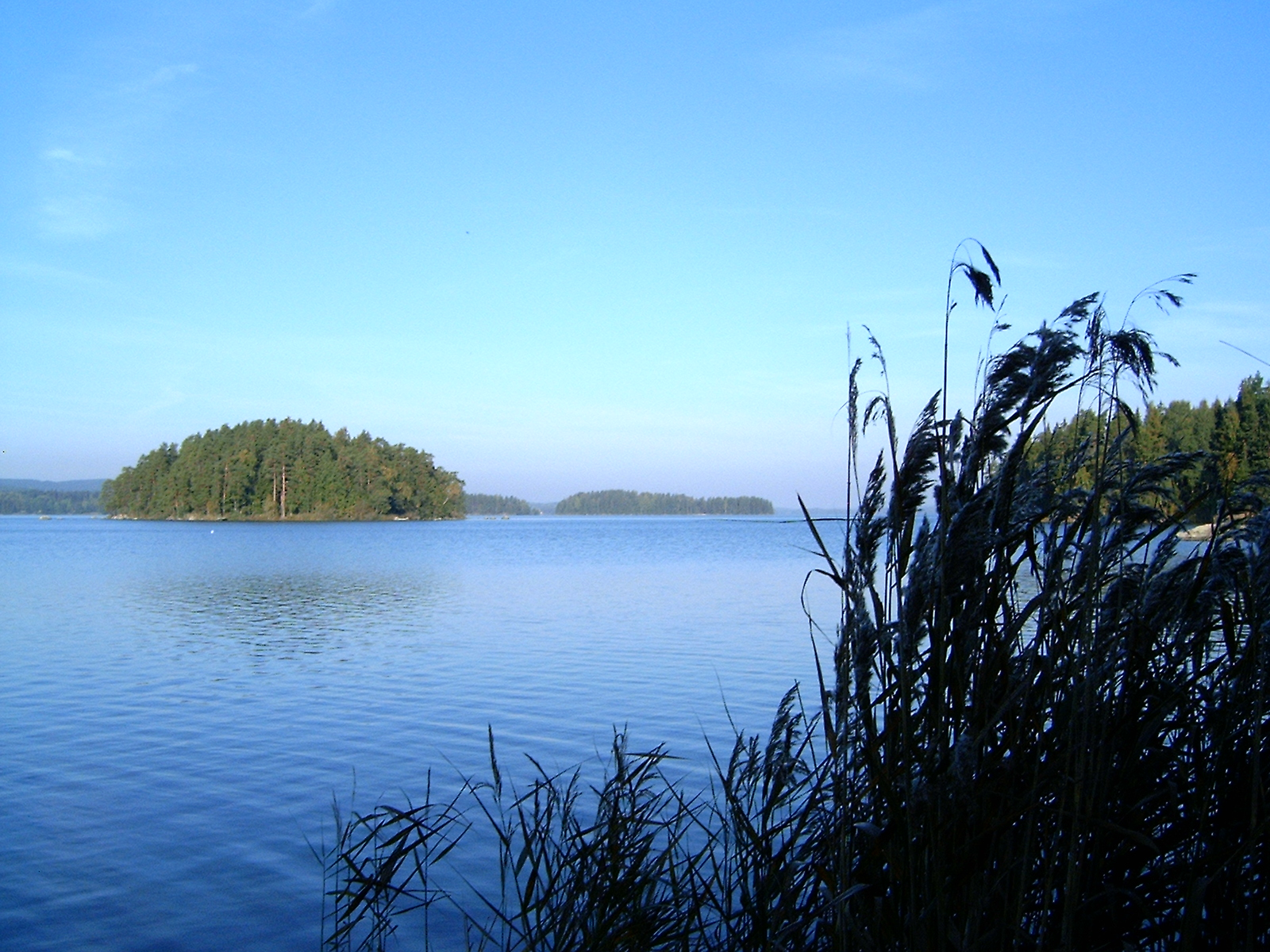
- The southern part of Åmänningen seen from Mellanängen, north of Virsbo. The island seen in the picture is Karboholmen.
- Interactive map of Åmänningen
- Location: Sweden
- Coordinates: 59°55′56.57″N 15°58′19.85″E
- Part of: North Baltic Sea Water District
- Primary inflows: Kolbäcksån river
- Primary outflows: Kolbäcksån river
- Surface area: 24.7 km^{2} (9.5 sq mi)
- Surface elevation: 76 m (249 ft)

Åmänningen is a lake situated within the municipalities of Fagersta and Surahammar in Västmanland, and contributes to the primary drainage network of the Norrström River. The lake has an area of 24.7 square kilometers and has an elevation of 76 meters above sea level. In test fishing, european perch, white bream, ruffe and northern pike have been caught in the lake.

Åmänningen is Västmanland's largest lake after Mälaren and Hjälmaren. Unlike Mälaren and Hjälmaren, Åmänningen is located entirely in Västmanland.

== Animals and nature ==
The most common birds breeding on the islands of Åmänningen and its surroundings are, for example, common terns, black-headed gulls, gulls, mallards, Canadian gooses, great crested grebes, black-throated loones, sea hawks, sanpipers and herons. The lake contains perch, pike and zander. There are also signal crayfish. There are also beavers, otters and european perch in Åmänningen and its surrounding streams and lakes.

== Recreational activities ==
The settlement around Åmänningen consists largely of holiday homes. There are several smaller villages that are partly recreational, but also areas with only holiday homes. Åmänningen is popular for canoeing in the summer. There are small local bathing areas. Recreational fishing is extensive in Åmänningen with catches of perch, pike and zander. Fishing licenses can be purchased locally. The lake freezes in early winter due to its altitude (about 75 m above sea level). In winter, when the ice has gained enough thickness, the lake is a popular destination for ice skating.

The fairway through Åmänningen and to Ängelsberg is marked with a dotted line. The bottom of Åmänningen is littered with boulders and there is a risk of running aground, sometimes quite far from shore. Recreational boat harbors are located in Virsbo and Ängelsberg. To the north, the lake Lilla Aspen leads to lake Stora Aspen and on to Västanfors. Further travel to the north is via locks. To the south, the locks in Virsbo can be reached by boat. The Strömsholm canal and locks are open for recreational boating during the summer.

== Tourism ==
The station community of Ängelsberg is located on a slope towards Åmänningen. At the end of the 19th century, a colony of artists called the Engelsberg painters emerged here. These included Olof Arborelius, Mauritz Lindström, Ernst Lundström, Axel Fahlcrantz and others. The community grew when the rail link with Stockholm was created. In Ängelsberg there are three houses designed by the famous architect Isak Gustaf Clason, namely (Ulvaklev, Hvilan and Odensnäs). The Ängelsberg Festival offers several days of music events every summer. The Ängelsberg Sculpture Park is adjacent to the community.

The Strömsholm canal runs through Åmänningen. The Barkens Steamboat Association operates passenger traffic on the Strömsholm Canal with Ångfartyget Runn. It's a nostalgic trip between Smedjebacken and Ängelsberg, further by train to Kärrgruvan, and then returning by bus to Smedjebacken.

== Iron management ==
As part of the Strömsholm Canal, Åmänningen was an important transportation route for iron ore and iron. Transports went south with finished products. Iron ore was also transported from Norberg via Ängelsberg to the smelter in Trummelsberg. The canal was superseded by the railway when it was built in the second half of the 19th century. Today, highway 66 runs along the western side of Åmänningen and the railway along the eastern side.

The Engelsberg ironworks operated from the end of the 17th century until 1919. The mill is now one of Sweden's World Heritage Sites (on the UNESCO World Heritage List), and is part of the Ecomuseum Bergslagen. The mill has a mansion, park, mill offices, workers' housing and industrial buildings. Ängelsberg is the only mill in Sweden that retains both the buildings and most of the technical equipment.

Bloomeries in Dunshammar, two km south of Ängelsberg, are the oldest link in a 1500-year tradition of iron making in the area. The furnaces are well preserved and the site is one of the few where you can see Iron Age blast furnaces in their proper environment.

== Oil island ==
In 1876, an oil refinery was established on the island of Barrön, now called Oljeön, in Lake Åmänningen. The factory was used for 26 years. The oil refinery is the oldest preserved in the world. The refinery on the island is open to visitors during the summer. The oil island is an environment in Ecomuseum Bergslagen and is owned by Preem. The island is accessible from Ängelsberg station house via a short boat trip with the boat "Petrolia".

== Sub-catchment area ==
Åmänningen is part of the sub-basin (664582–150962) that SMHI calls the outlet of Åmänningen. The average altitude is 101 meters above sea level and the area is 96.2 square kilometers. If the 128 upstream catchment areas are included, the cumulative area is 2 680,19 square kilometers. The Kolbäcksån river that drains the catchment area has tributary order 3, which means that the water flows through a total of 3 watercourses before reaching the sea after 187 kilometers. The catchment area consists mostly of forest (58%). The catchment area has 25.55 square kilometers of water surface, giving it a lake percentage of 26.5 percent. The settlements in the area cover an area of 0.93 square kilometers or 1 percent of the catchment area.

== Fish ==
The following fish have been caught in the lake during exploratory fishing:

- European perch
- White bream
- Eurasian ruffe
- Northern pike
- Zander
- Common bleak
- Common roach
- European smelt
- European cisco

== Gallery ==
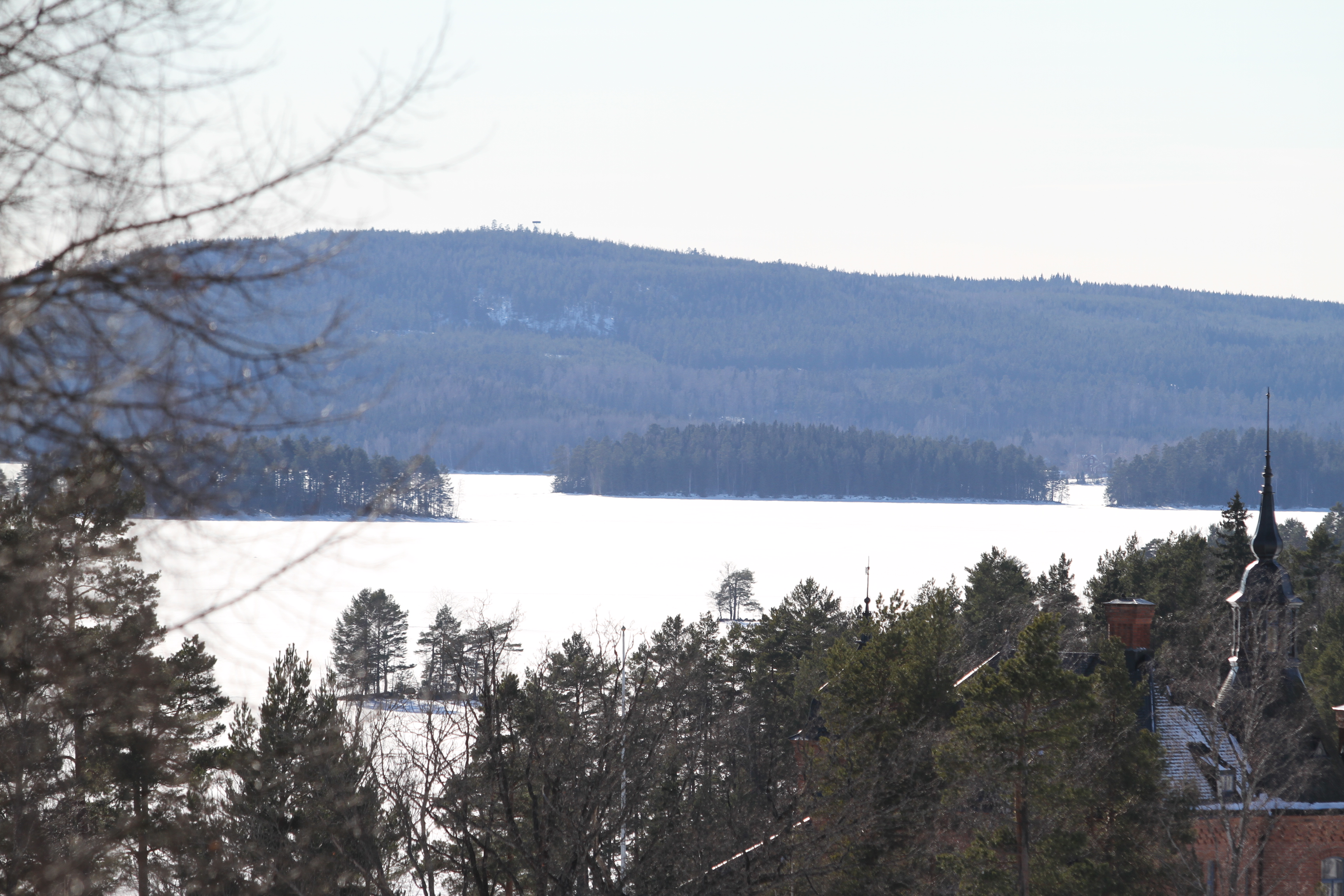
Åmänningen is covered in snow and ice. Villa Ulvaklev is in the foreground in the lower right corner. Landsberget is visible in the background. The picture is taken from Ängelsberg.

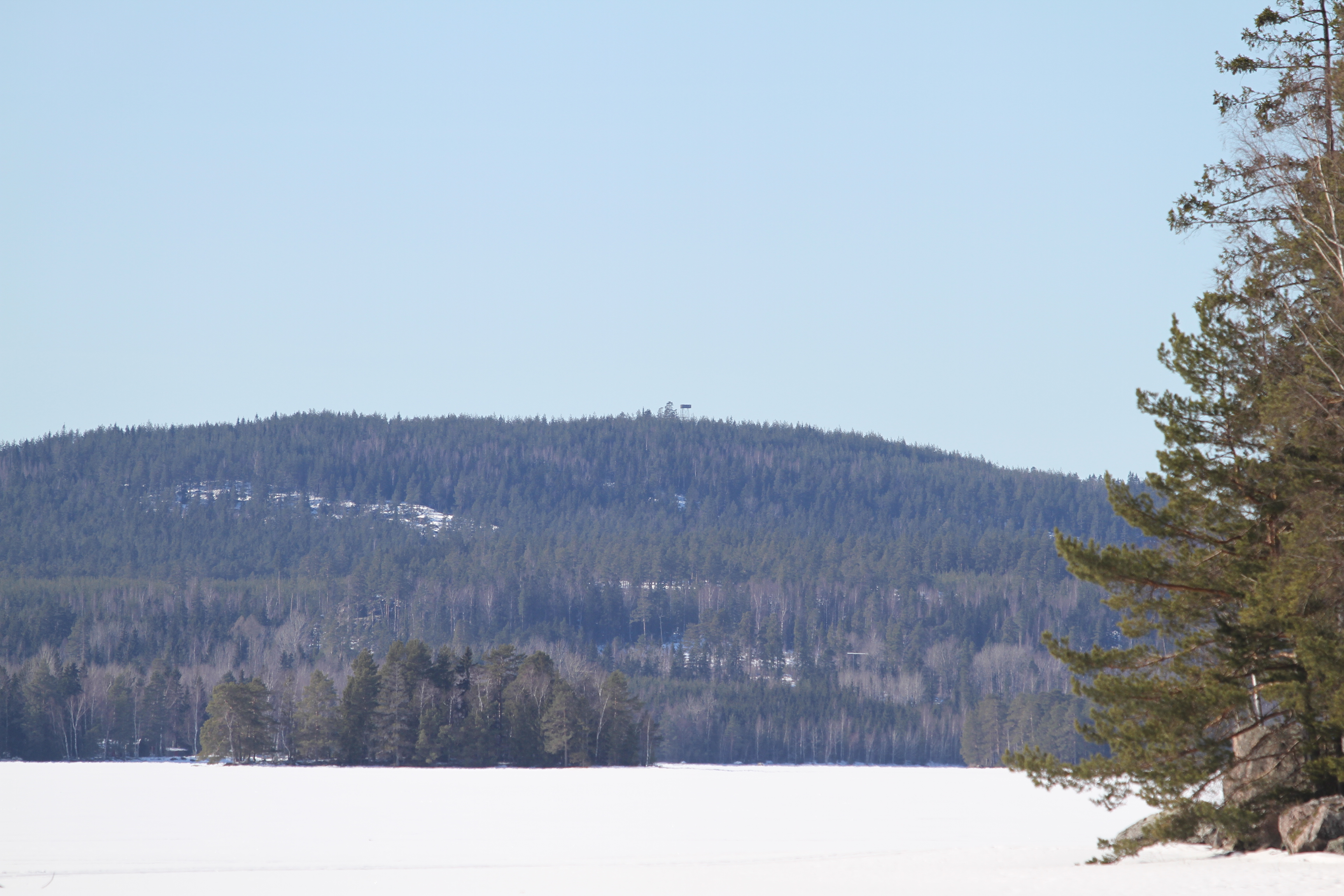
Åmänningen is covered in snow and ice. Landsberget is visible in the background. The picture is taken from Halvarsviken.

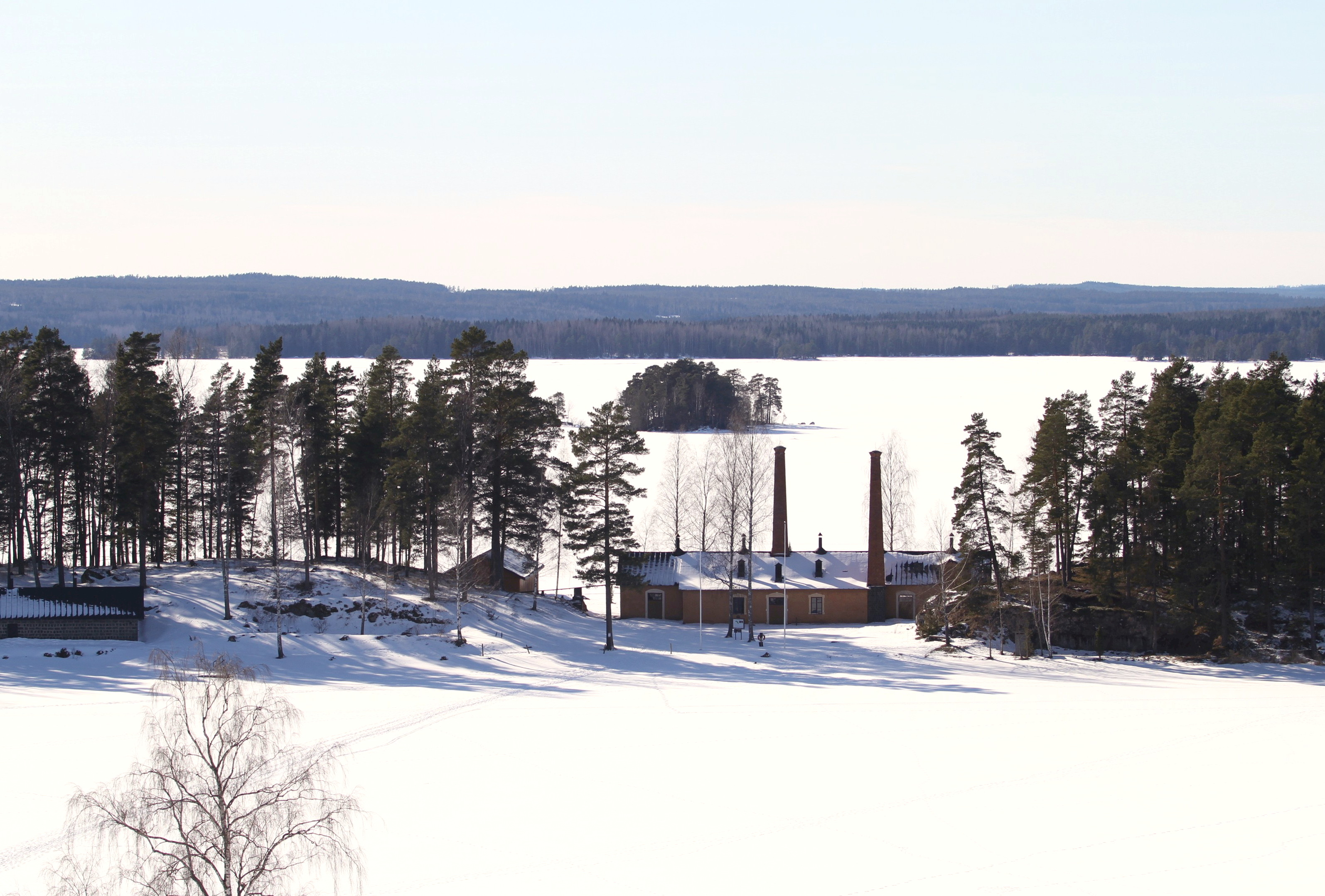
Oljeön is in the foreground. The picture is taken from Ängelsberg.

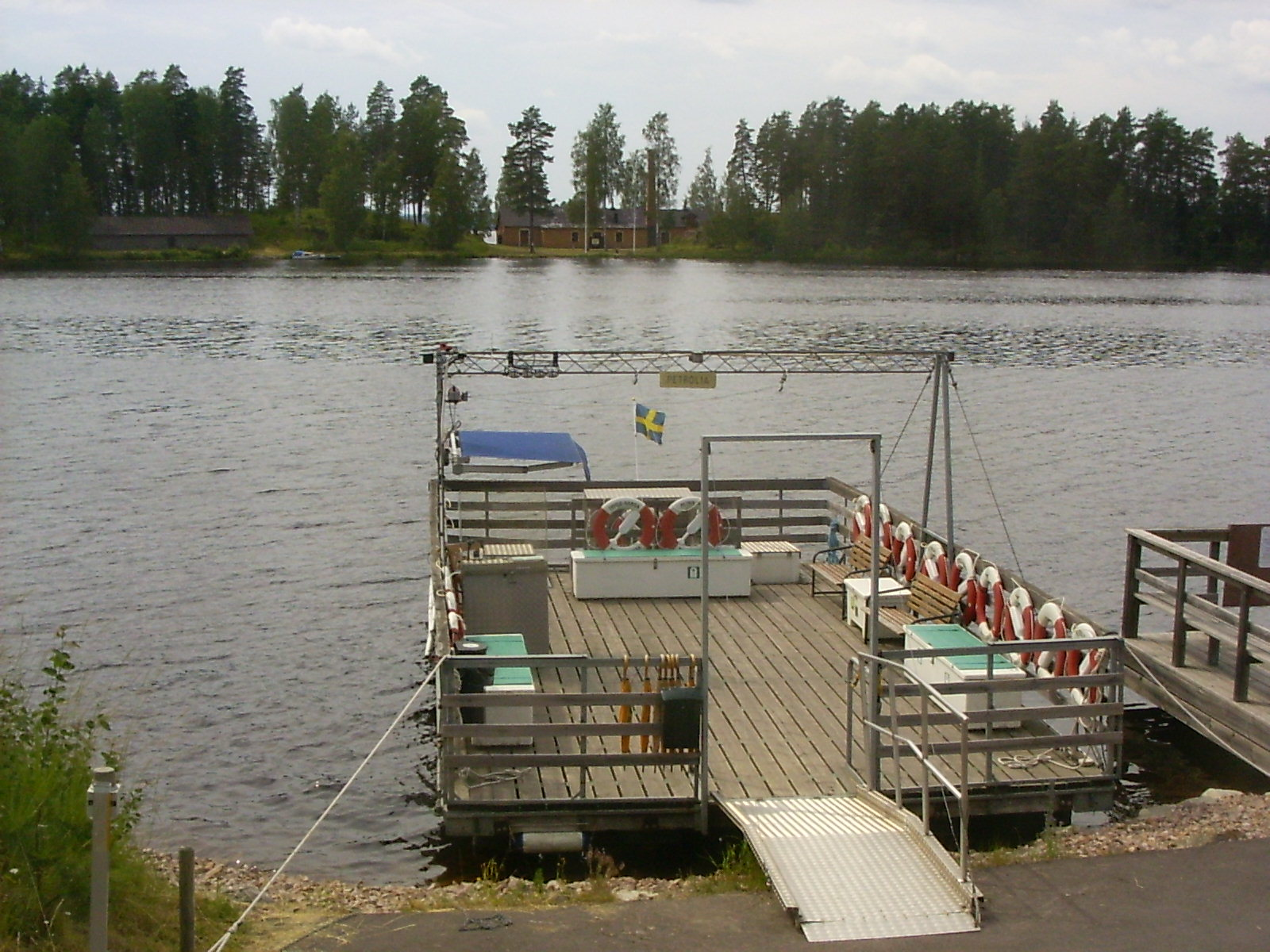
Oljeön with the ferry Petrolia in the foreground.

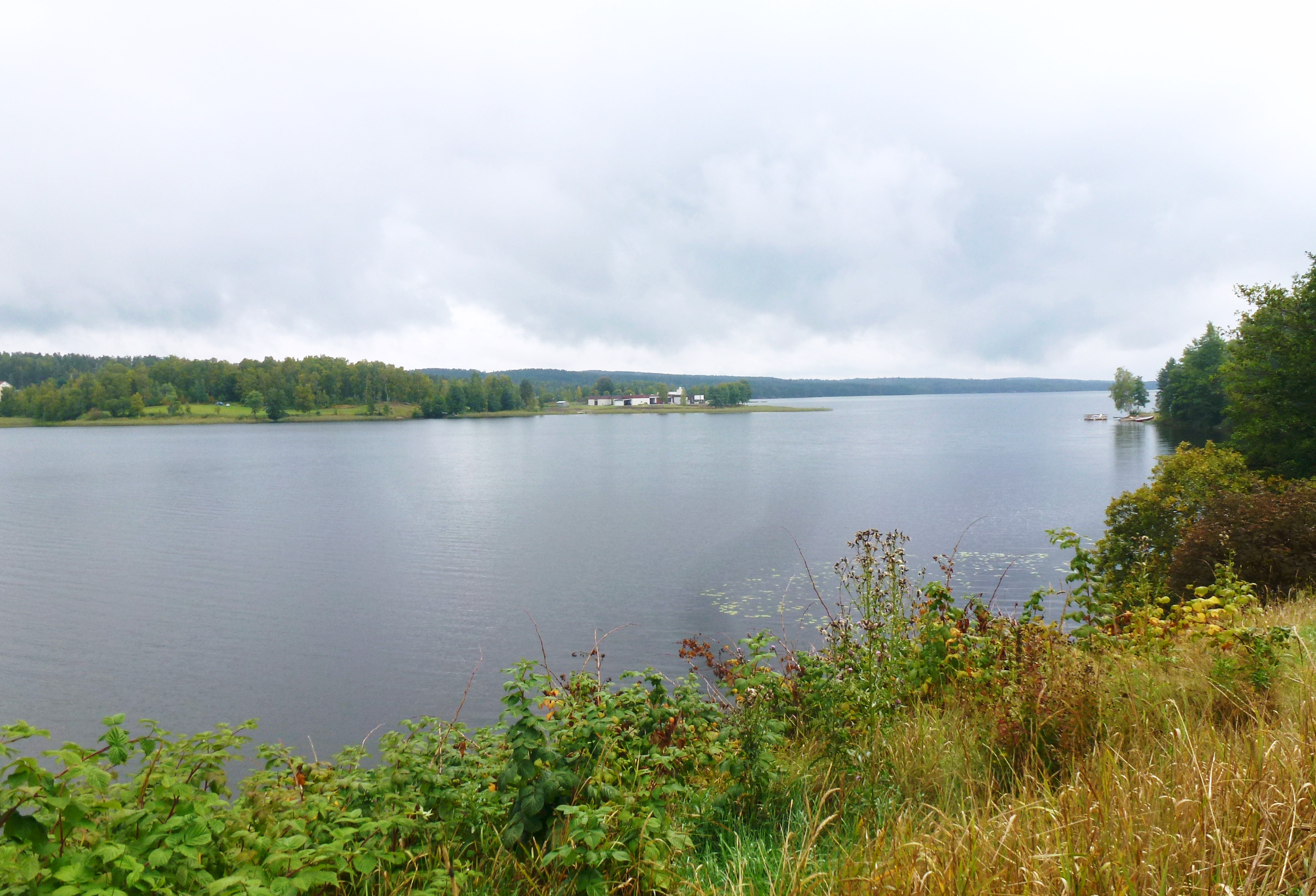
Lilla Aspen, south of Fagersta, 2013.

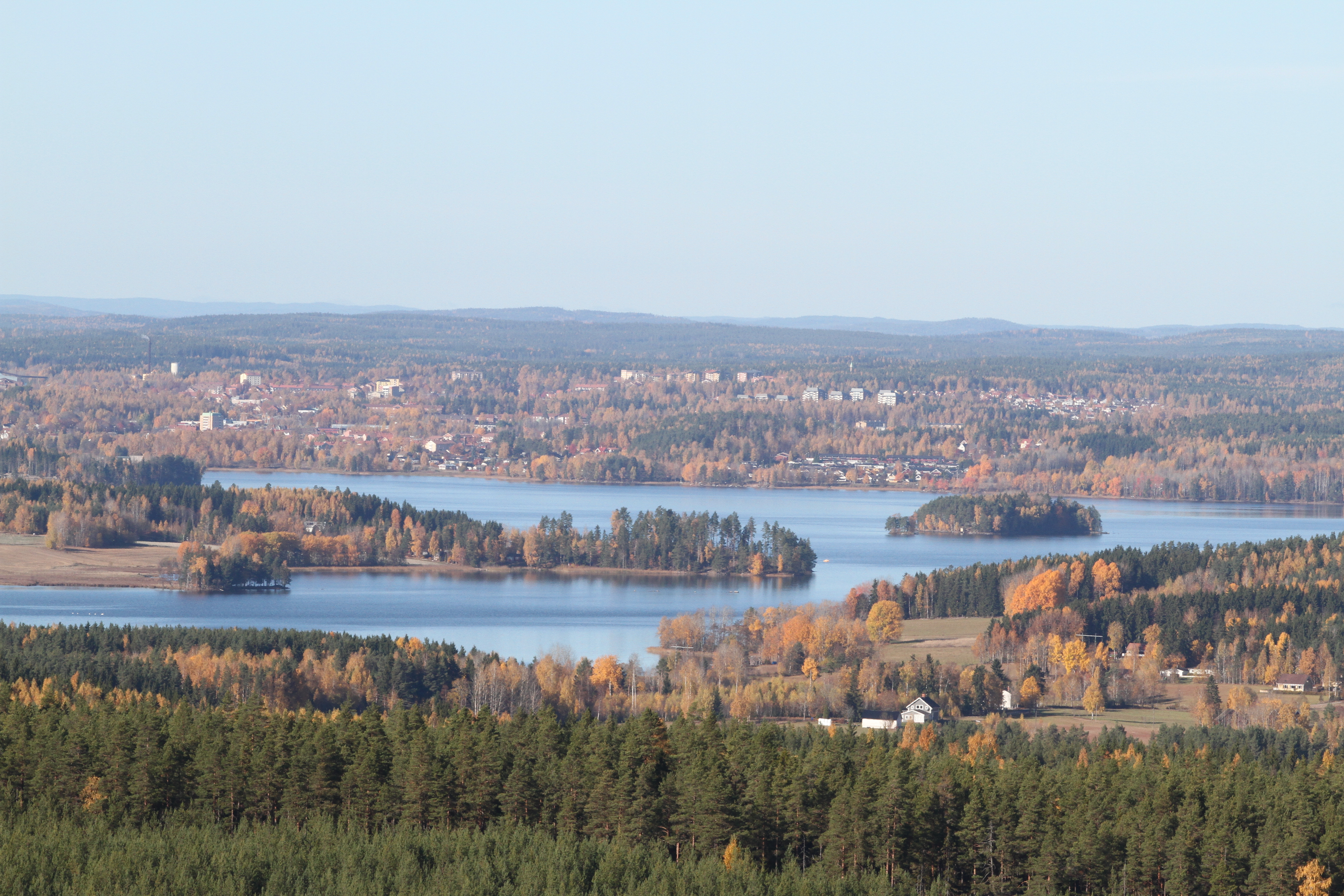
Fagersta and lake Stora Aspen seen from Landsberget.

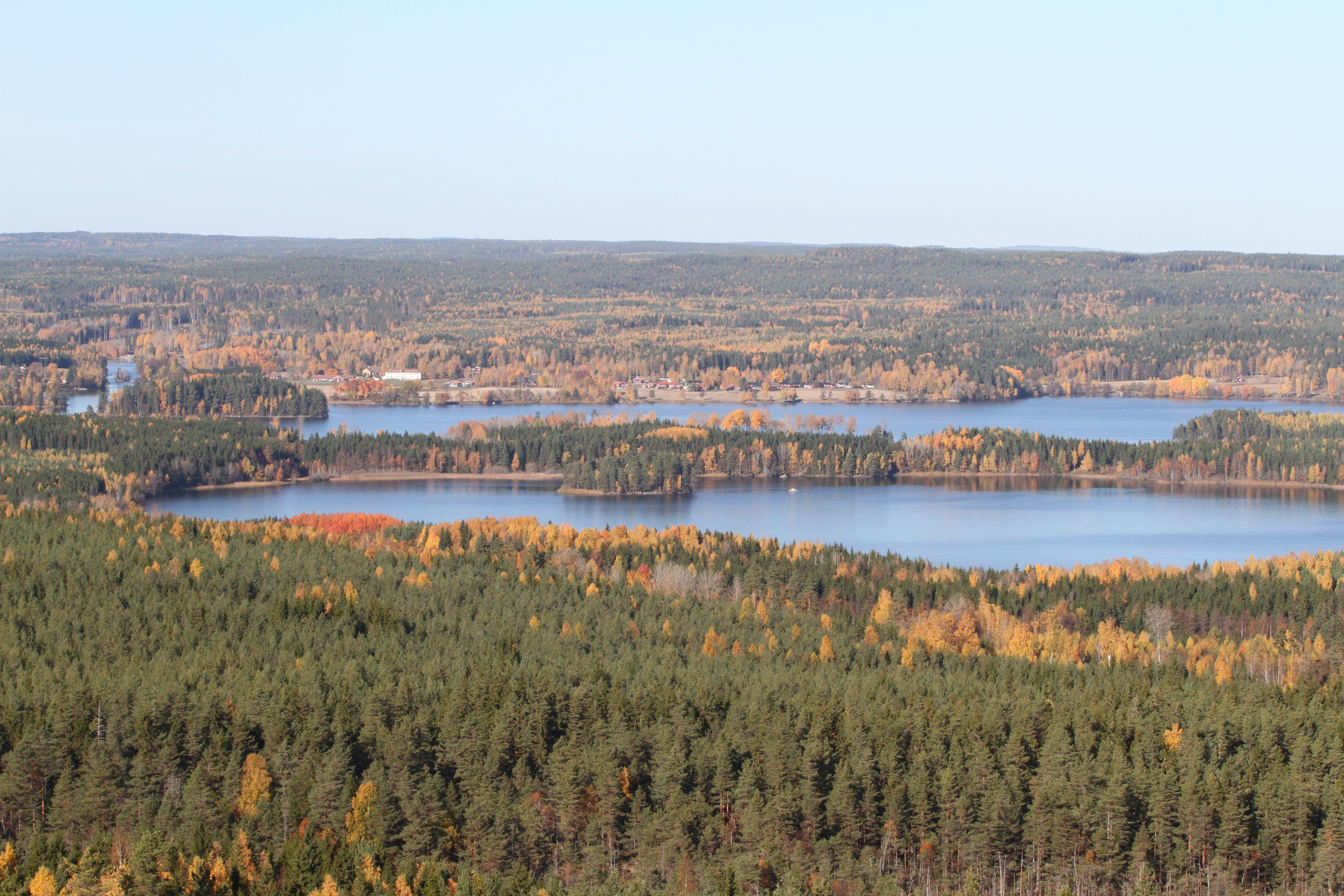
Lilla Aspen and Åmänningen seen from Landsberget

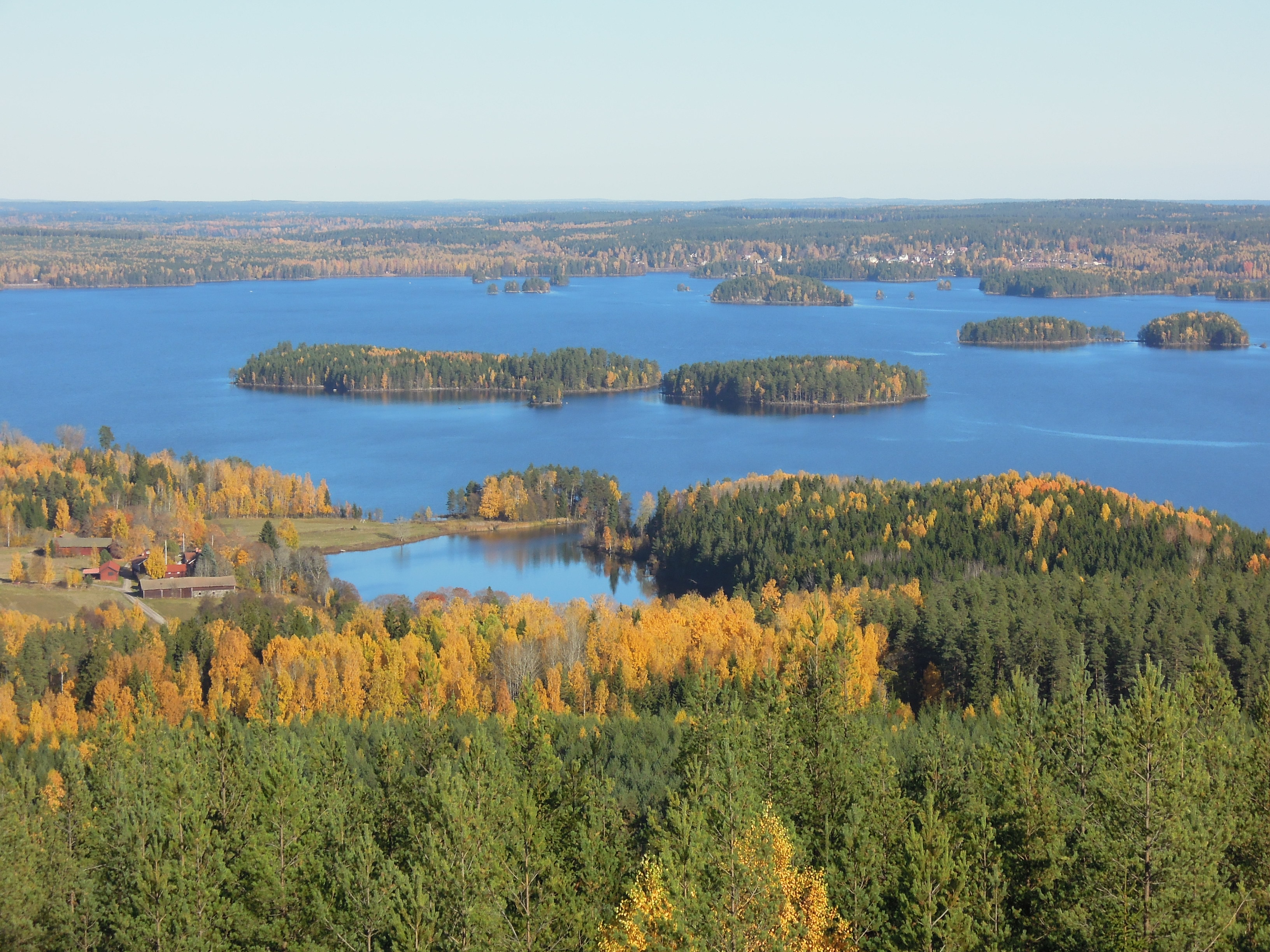
Åmänningen and Ängelsberg seen from Landsberget, Djupnäs in the foreground.
