= Engelsberg–Norberg Railway =

Heritage railway in Sweden

Coordinates: 59.9573°N 16.0097°E

Engelsberg–Norbergs Järnväg
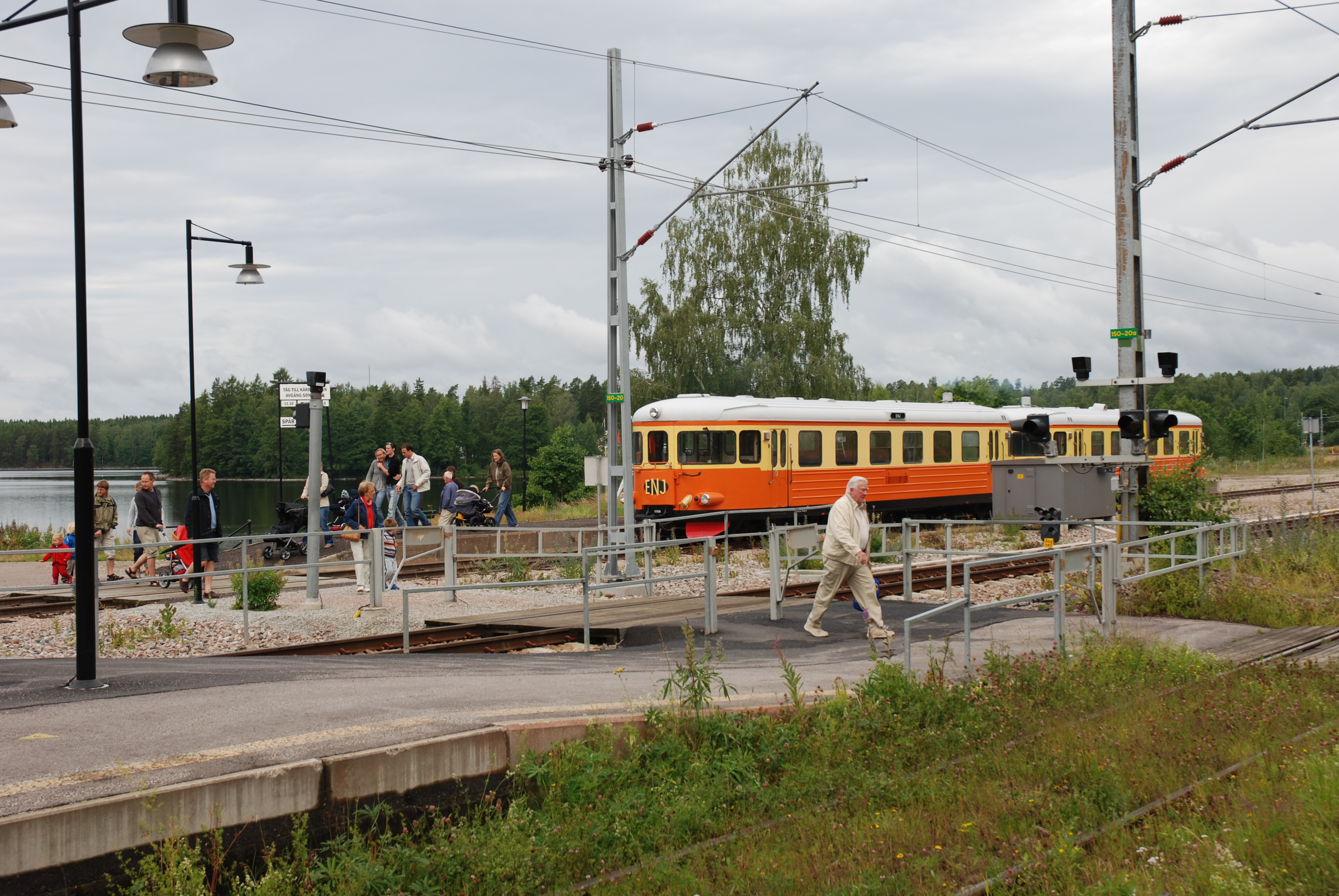
- Two Y7-railcars of ENJ at Ängelsberg railway station, July 2008. Photo: Bengt Oberger

Commercial operations
- Original gauge: 1,188 mm (3 ft 10 25/32 in) until 1876, converted to 1,435 mm (4 ft 8 1/2 in) at that year

Preserved operations
- Owned by: Engelsbergs Norberg Järnvägshistoriska förening (ENJ)
- Operated by: Engelsberg-Norberg Heritage Railway Association
- Length: 18 km (11 mi)
- Preserved gauge: 1,435 mm (4 ft 8 1/2 in) standard gauge

Commercial history
- Opened: December 1853
- Closed to passengers: 1962
- Closed: mid 1990s

Preservation history
- 1999: reopened

Engelsberg–Norbergs Järnväg, the Engelsberg–Norberg Railway, is a 1,435 mm (4 ft 8 1/2 in) standard gauge railway between Ängelsberg and Kärrgruvan in the province of Västmanland in Sweden, now being used by the Engelsbergs Norberg Järnvägshistoriska förening (ENJ), a heritage railway association.

== History ==
The 18 km (11 mi) long railway line was built in the 1850s with the purpose of transporting iron ore between the Norberg mining area and the lake Åmänningen, for further transport on barges on the Strömsholm Canal. Transport of goods on the first part of the line, Kärrgruvan – Trättbo begun in December 1853 with the first steam engine built in Sweden, Förstlingen (the First One), constructed by the Munktell Mechanical Workshops in Eskilstuna. A reconstructed company, Norbergs Nya Järnvägs AB was formed in 1855 and finished the whole line to Ängelsberg at the lake of Åmänningen in 1856. At that time the railway had a 1,188 mm (3 ft 10 25/32 in) gauge, widened to the Swedish 1,435 mm (4 ft 8 1/2 in) standard gauge in 1876.

In 1962 passenger service was discontinued, followed by freight services in the mid 1990s.

== The Heritage Railway Association ==
Engelsbergs Norberg Järnvägshistoriska förening (ENJ), the Engelsberg-Norberg Heritage Railway Association, started in 1999, aims to organize regular traffic for tourists with diesel railcars between Ängelsberg and Kärrgruvan. The association has two locomotive sheds, including a roundhouse and turntable at Ängelsberg and a shed at Kärrgruvan. The latter was built in 1857 and is the oldest preserved locomotive shed in Sweden.

ENJ uses three 1950s railcars for regular traffic:

- The Multiple Unit YBo7 No 1156, constructed 1957 by ASJ, Östersund
- The Multiple Unit YBo7 No 1255, constructed 1959 by Eksjö-verken, Eksjö
- The Control Unit Ybfoby No 2076

ENJ also has other stock for permanent way and maintenance use, including:

- 0-4-0DM Deutz 'Grodan' (Frog), in green

As well as various coaching stock awaiting restoration in the sidings at Kärrgruvan. ENJ's long term hopes are to run a summer steam service on the line, and has secured these coaches to be used when appropriate motive power becomes available. For now, the railcars provide the backbone of the service.

== Photo gallery ==
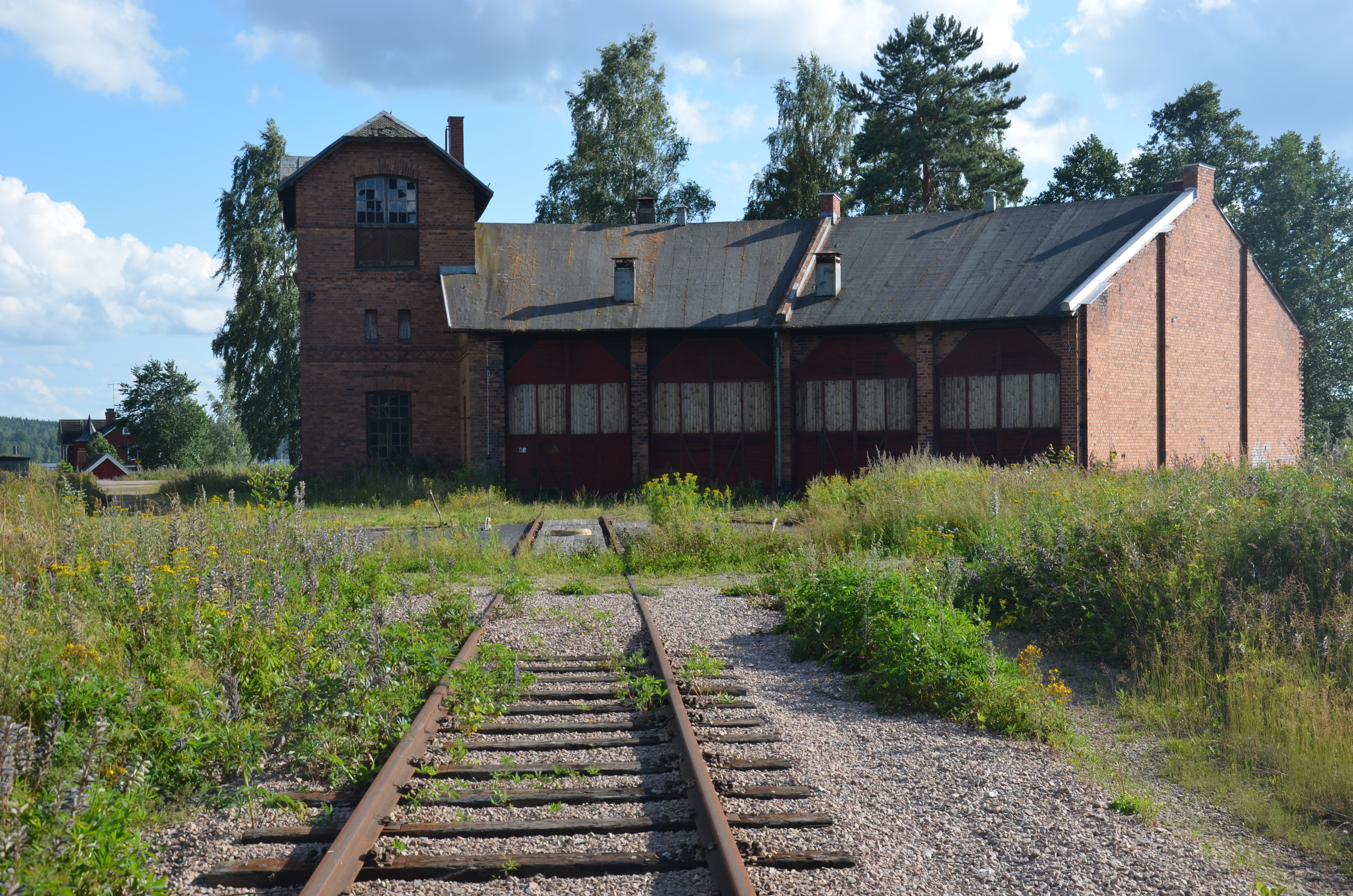
The Roundhouse at Engelsberg

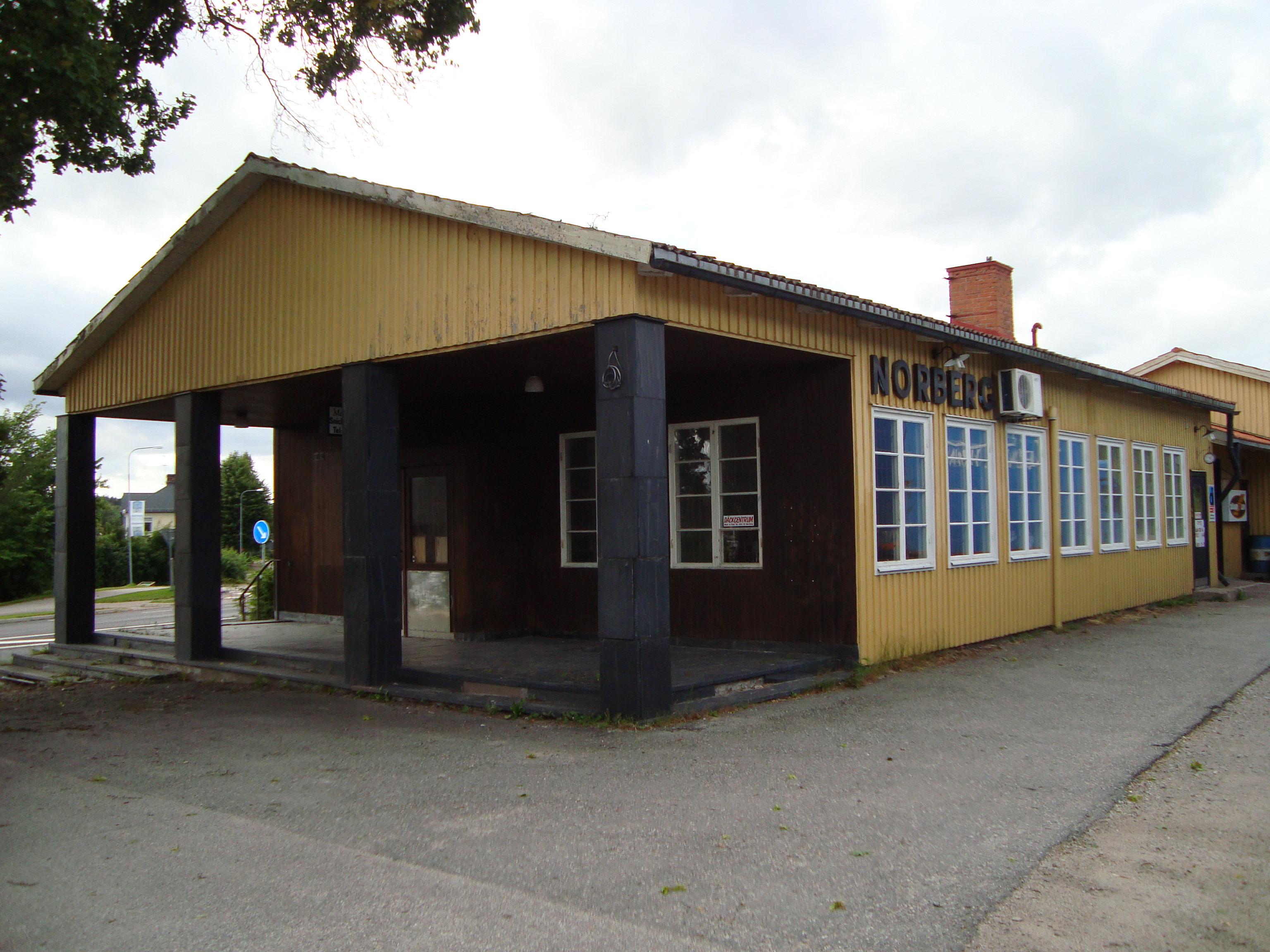
Norberg Station building, now a garage

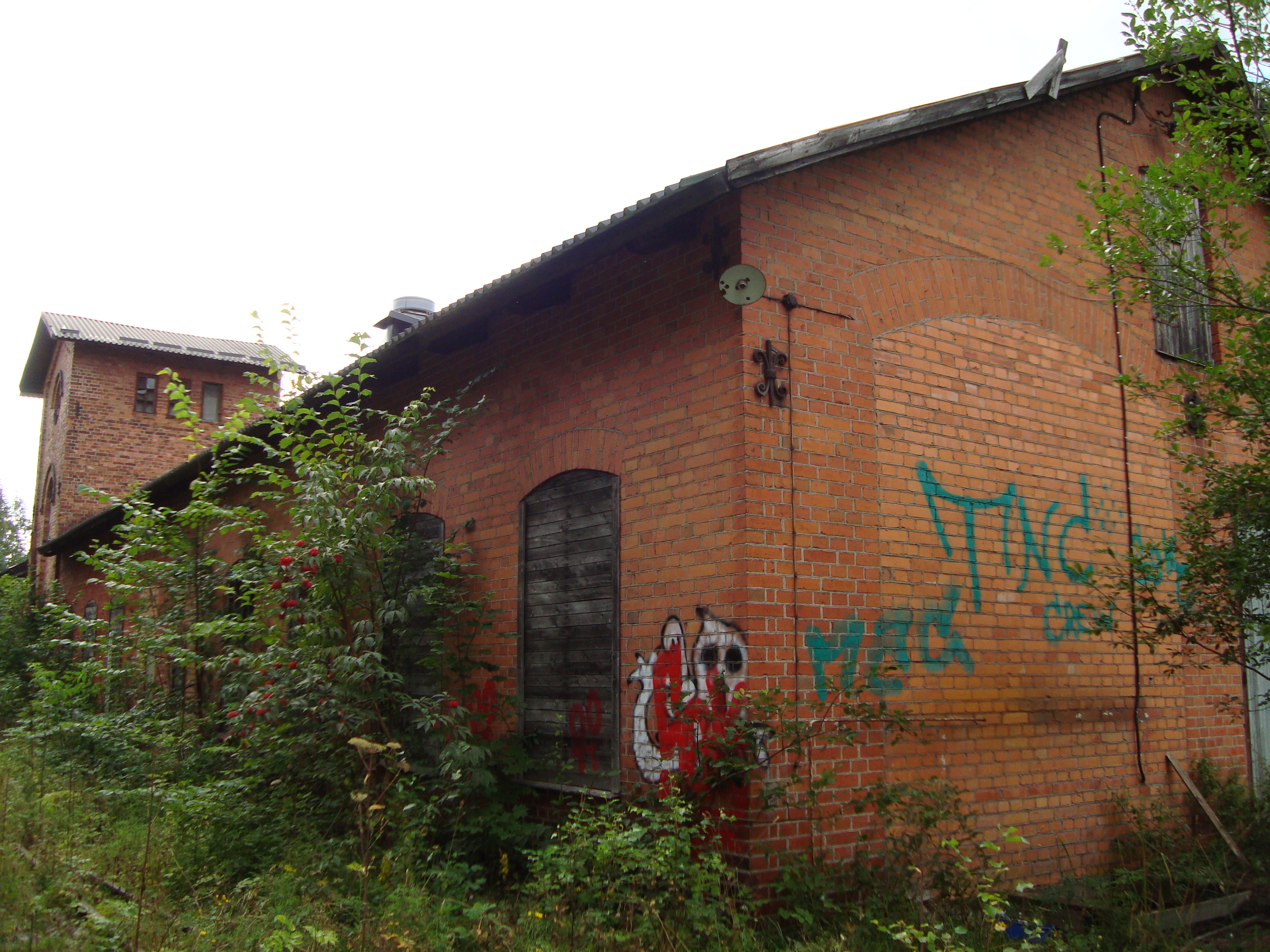
Former rail shed, Kärrgruvan

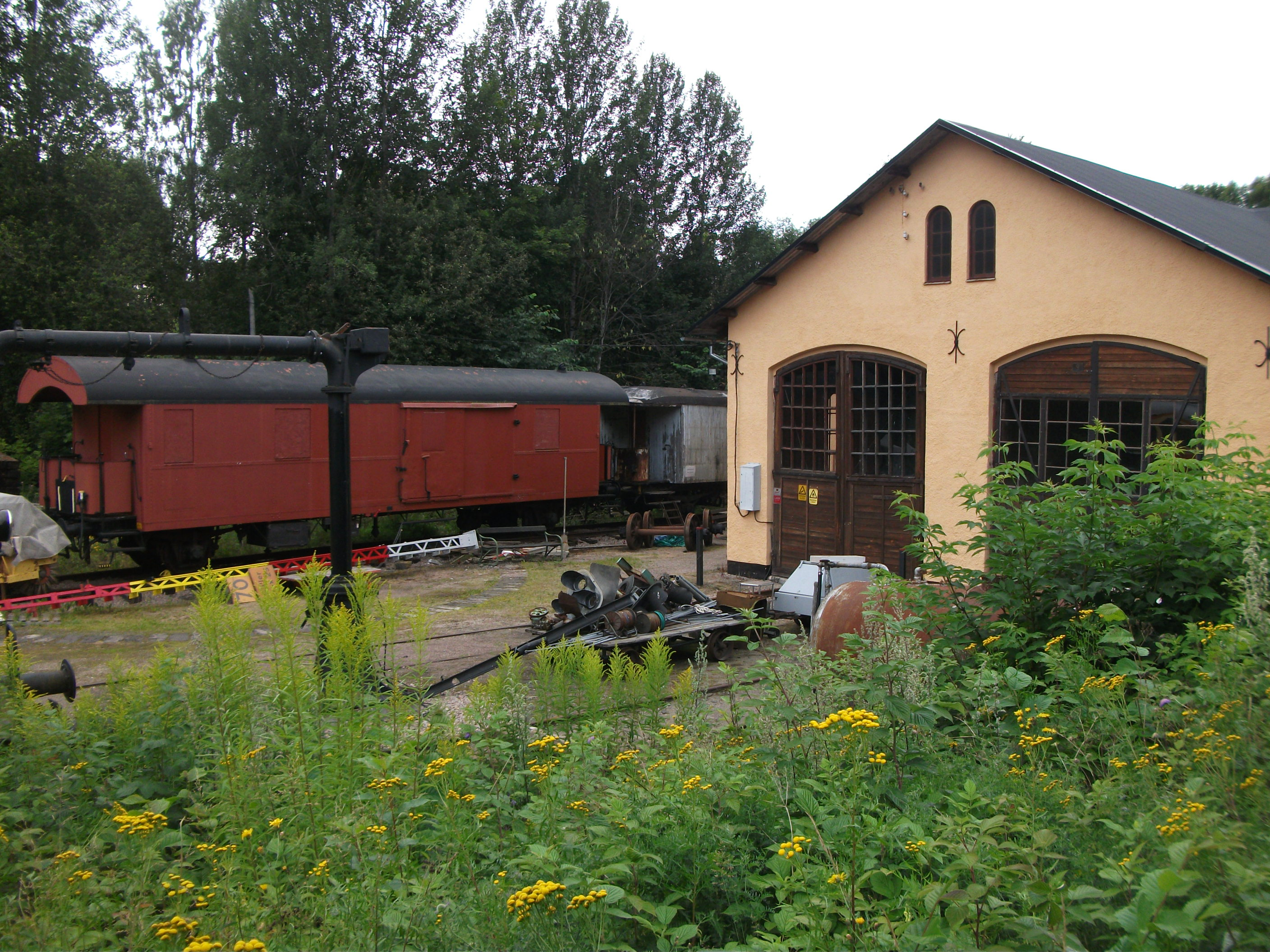
The locomotive shed at Kärrgruvan

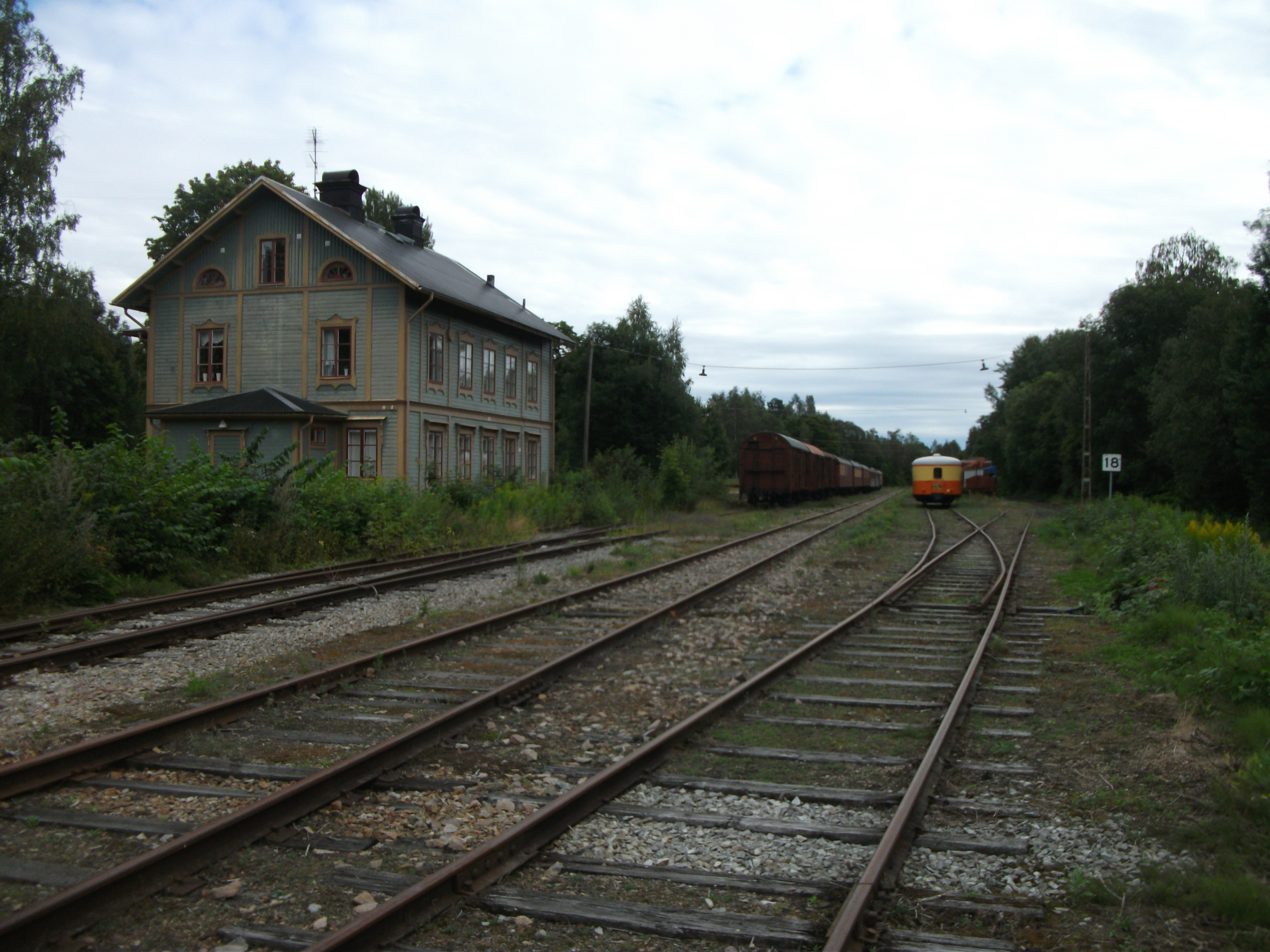
The former station building at Kärrgruvan, now a hostel

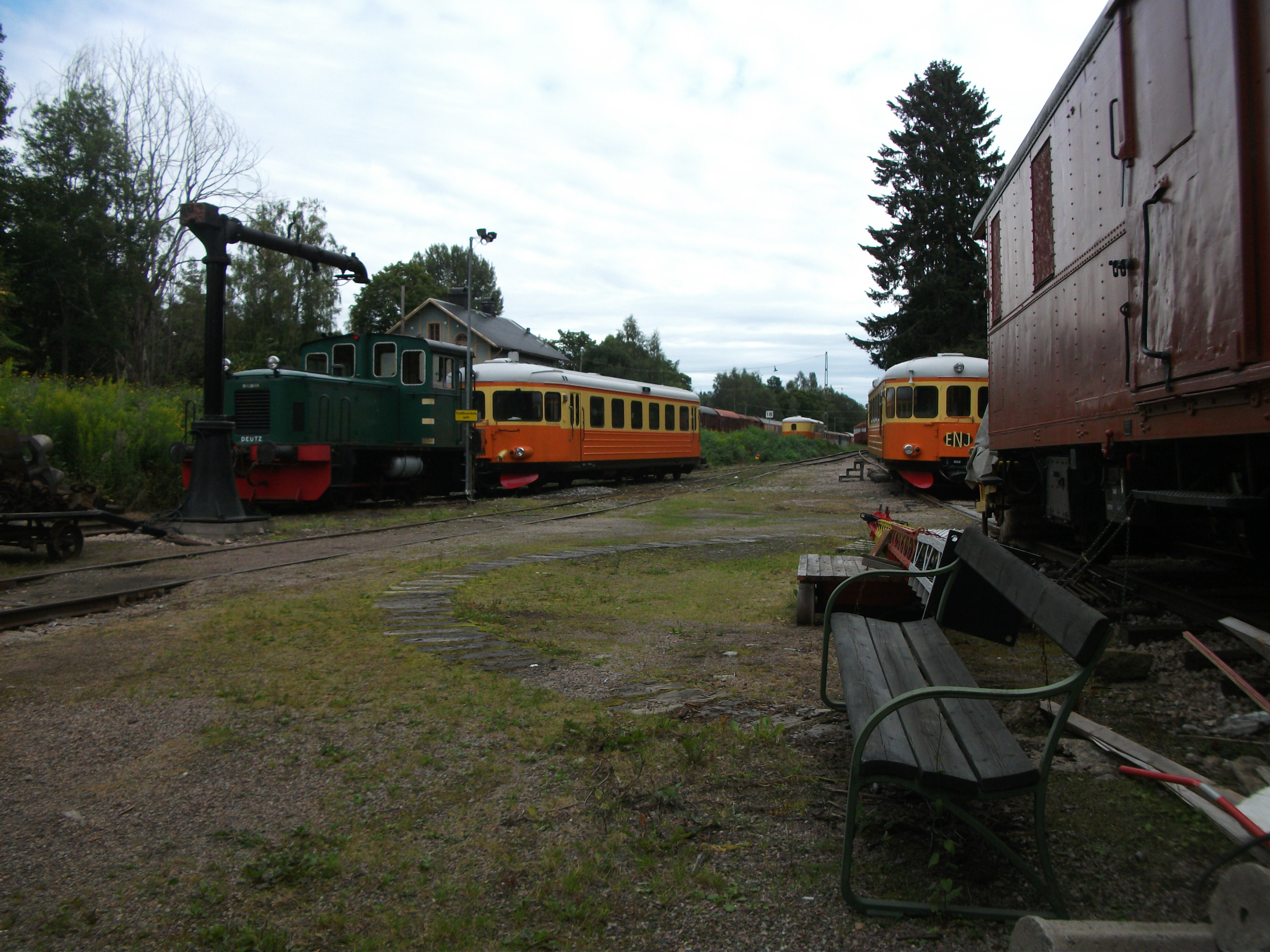
'Grodan' and railbuses stabled outside the shed at Kärrgruvan

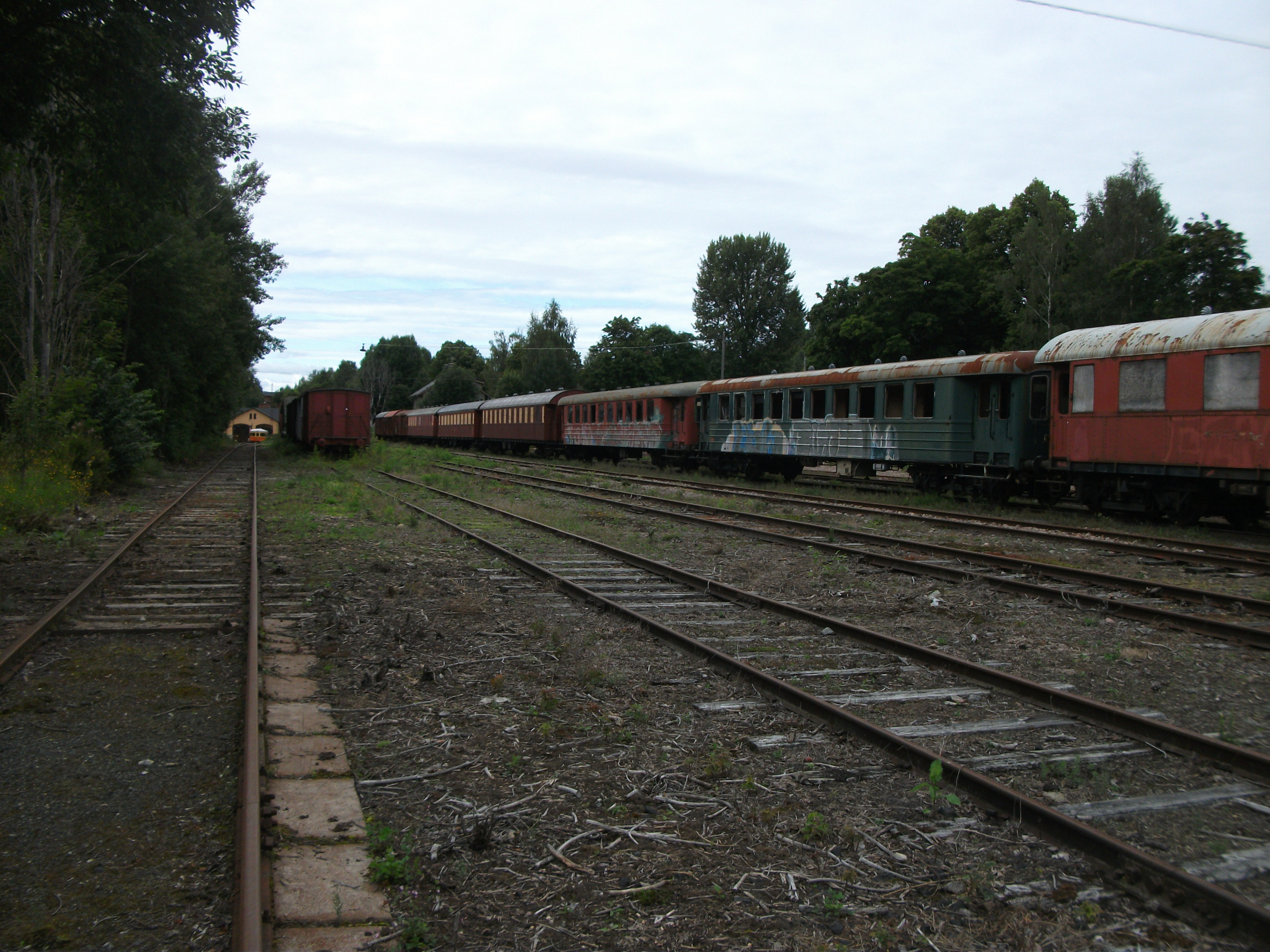
Rolling stock awaiting restoration in Kärrgruvan yard

== Note ==
This article is based on the article about the Engelsberg-Norbergs Järnväg in the Swedish language Wikipedia.
