= Ecomuseum Bergslagen =

Open-air museum in Sweden

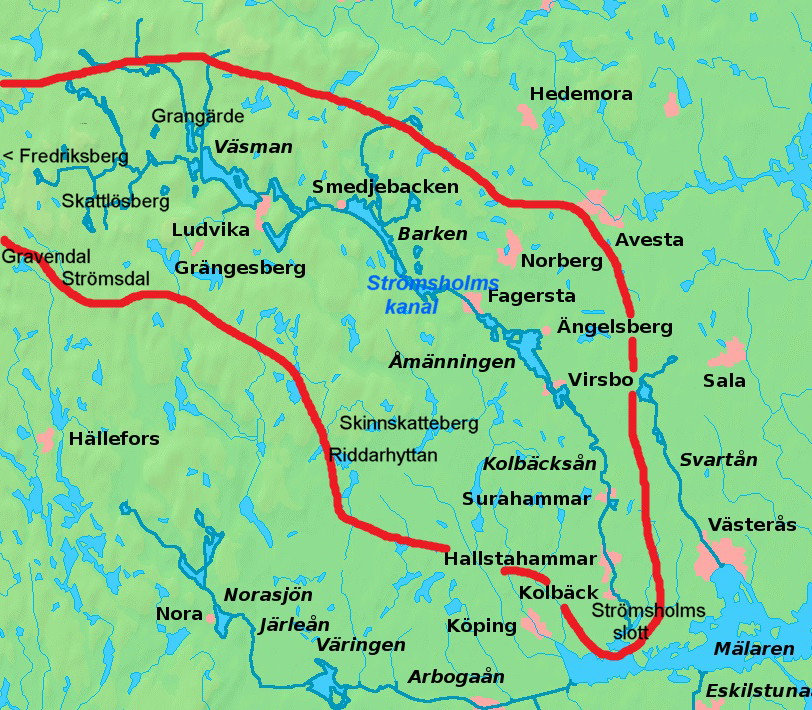
Ekomuseum Bergslagen, map.

Ecomuseum Bergslagen (Swedish: Ekomuseum Bergslagen) is an open-air museum in the western part of the former mining and smelting region of Bergslagen in central Sweden. The museum opened in 1986 and is today the world's largest ecomuseum. The museum is a joint project of the municipalities Ludvika, Smedjebacken, Fagersta, Norberg, Skinnskatteberg, Surahammar and Hallstahammar. Two provincial museums in Dalarna and Västmanland County participate in the project. In 1998 Ecomuseum Bergslagen was awarded as the best industrial history museum in Europe with the Luigi Micheletti Award.

== The museum ==
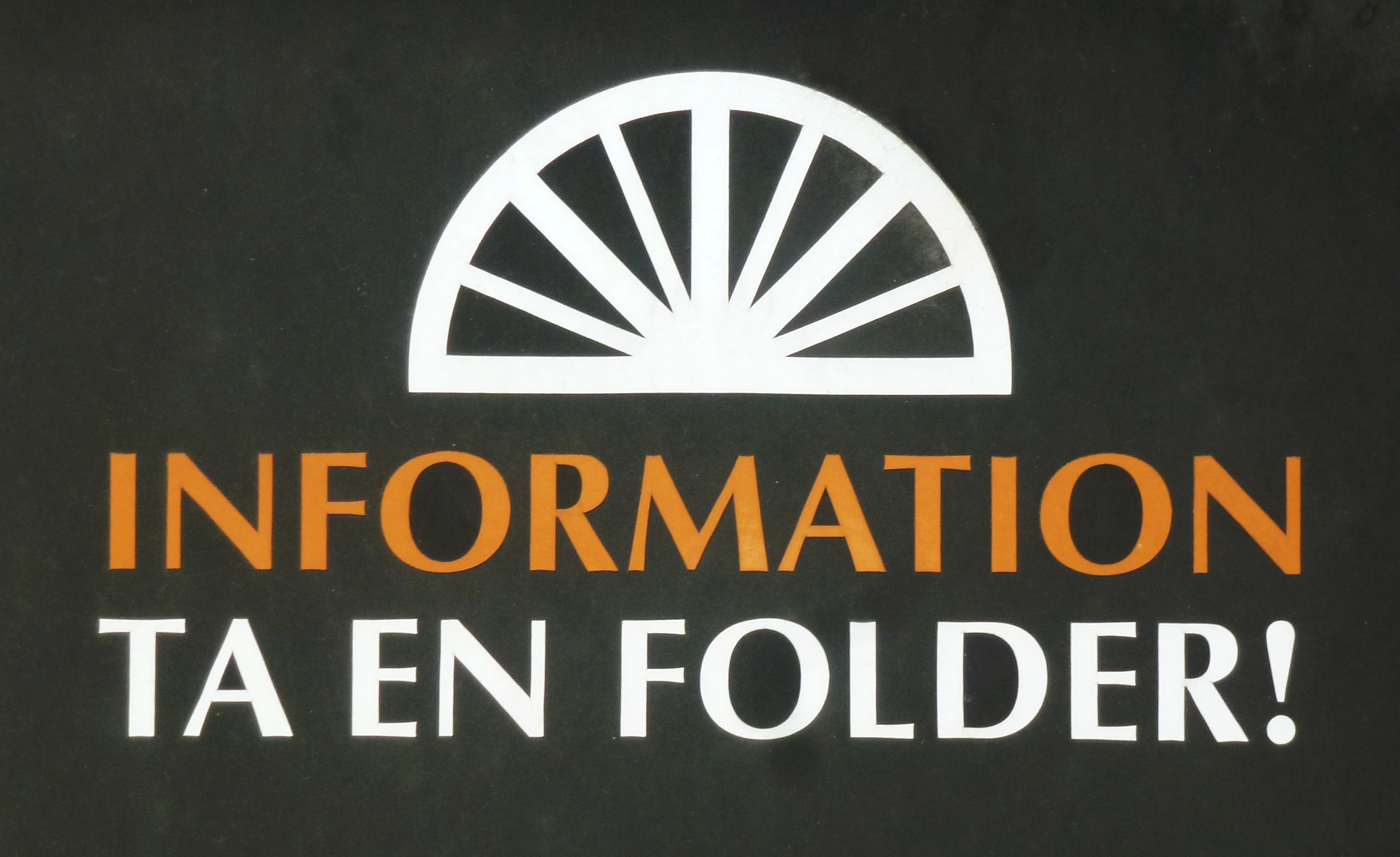
Museums logo, a water wheel.

Ecomuseum Bergslagen is a 750 square kilometre area reaching from Lake Mälaren in the south to Forest Finns forests in the north. It takes about three hours by car to travel from north to south and the visitors travel on their own through the landscape. About 60 sites describe how human beings have used the region's natural resources to survive over time. The history of production of iron is the theme of the museum. Bergslagen was once the most important iron area in Sweden.

You can follow the history of mining for more than 2000 years – from 400 BC until today. Ekomuseum Bergslagen shows mythical pre-historic ironwork sites with historical blast furnaces and smithy, rolling mills, and modern steel businesses along the vital transportation route, the Strömsholms Canal. But also castles, such as Strömsholm Palace, workers' homes in Ludvika and Grängesberg and Forest Finns simple settlements and cottages near Grangärde. The museum includes several mining areas, local museums, electric power stations, historical railways (Engelsberg-Norberg Railway), and a historical railway museum (Railway museum Grängesberg). One of the attractions is Lapphyttan in Norberg Municipality, may be regarded as the type site for the Medieval Blast Furnace. Its date is probably between 1150 and 1350. It produced cast iron, which was then fined to make ferritic wrought iron cake or bun-like blooms. Another attraction is Engelsberg Ironworks (Swedish: Engelsbergs bruk), an ironworks in Ängelsberg. It was built in 1681 and is listed as a UNESCO World Heritage Site since 1993.

== Gallery ==
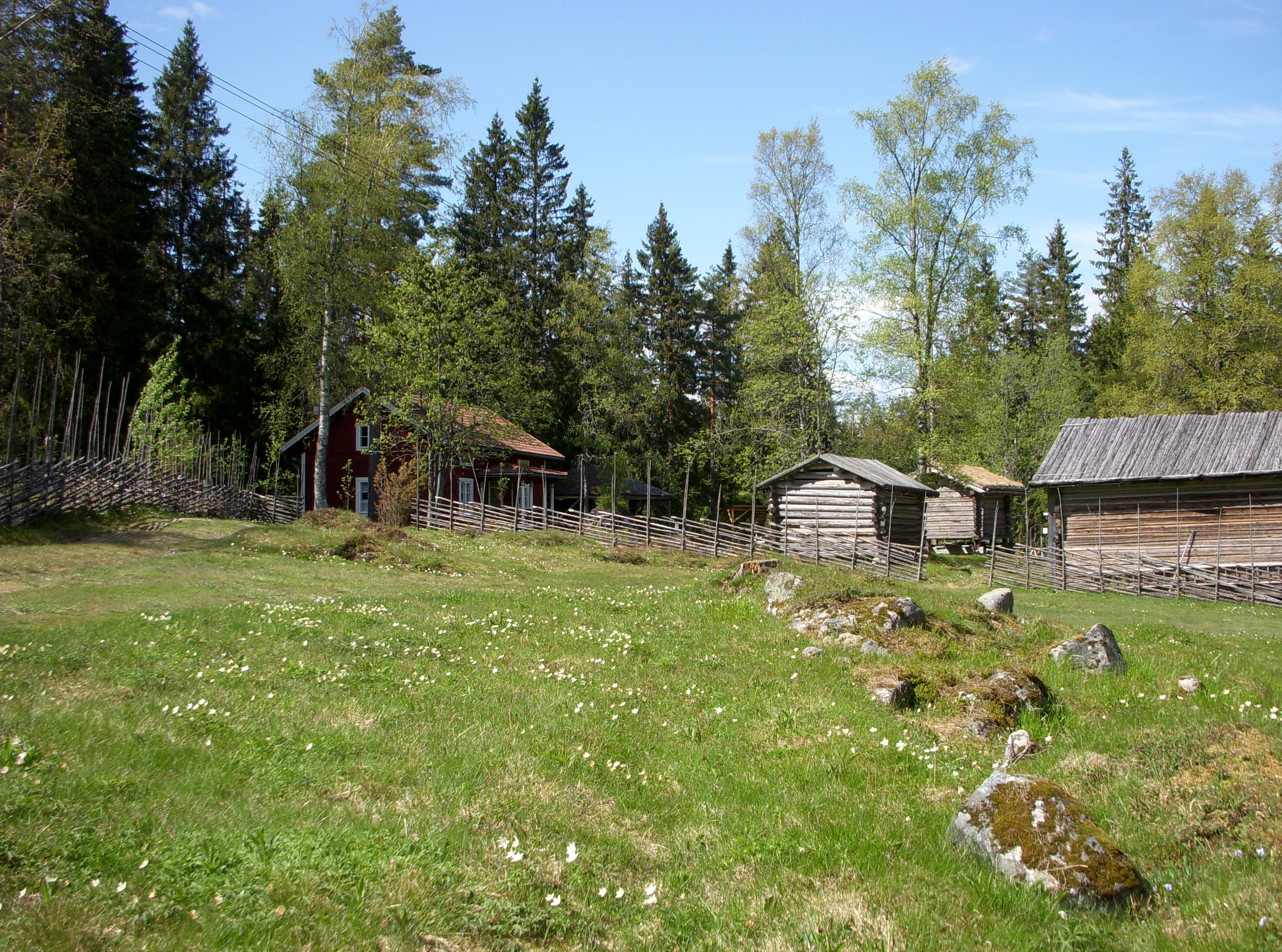
Local museum "Finngammelgården"

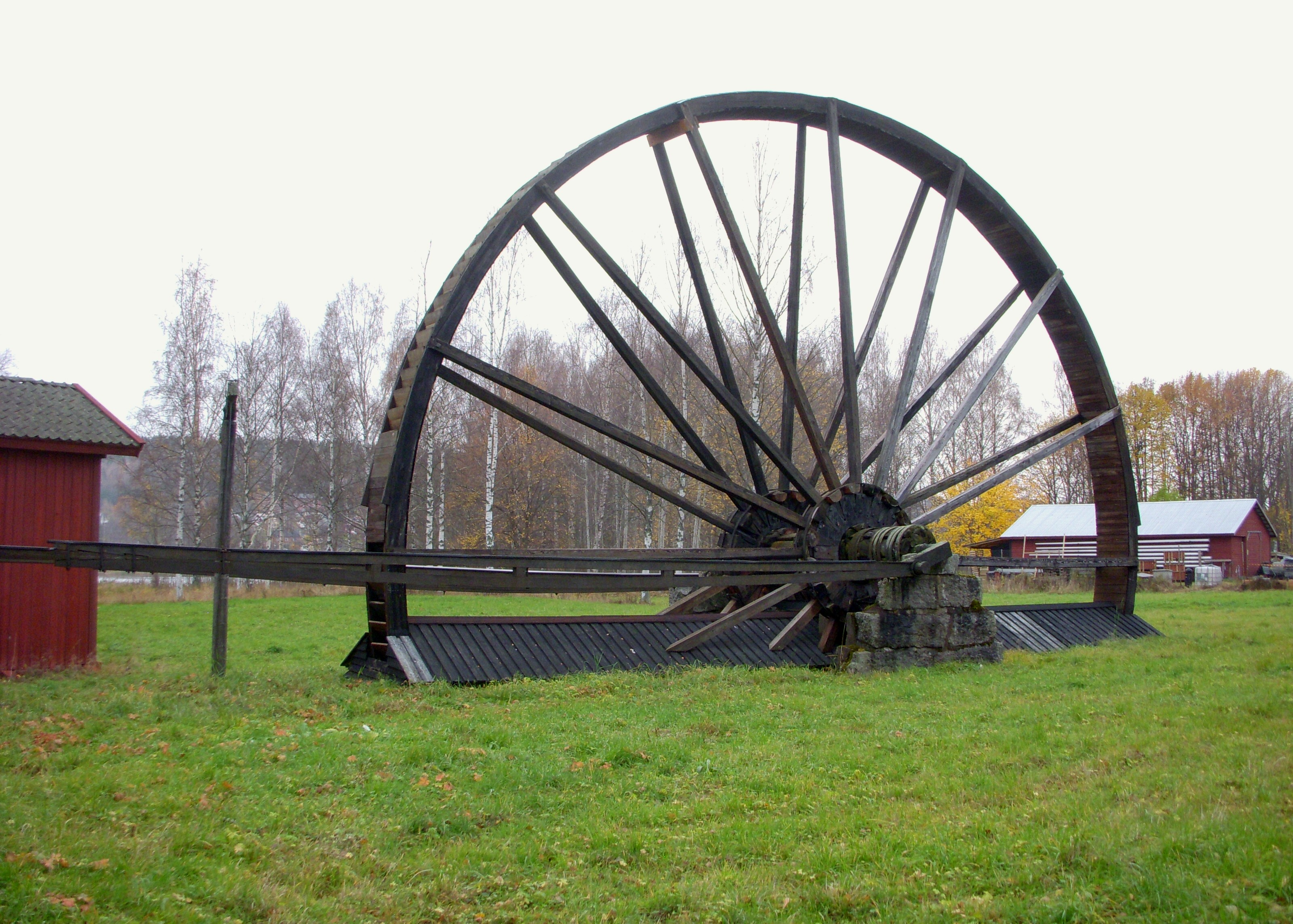
Local museum "Ludvika Gammelgård"

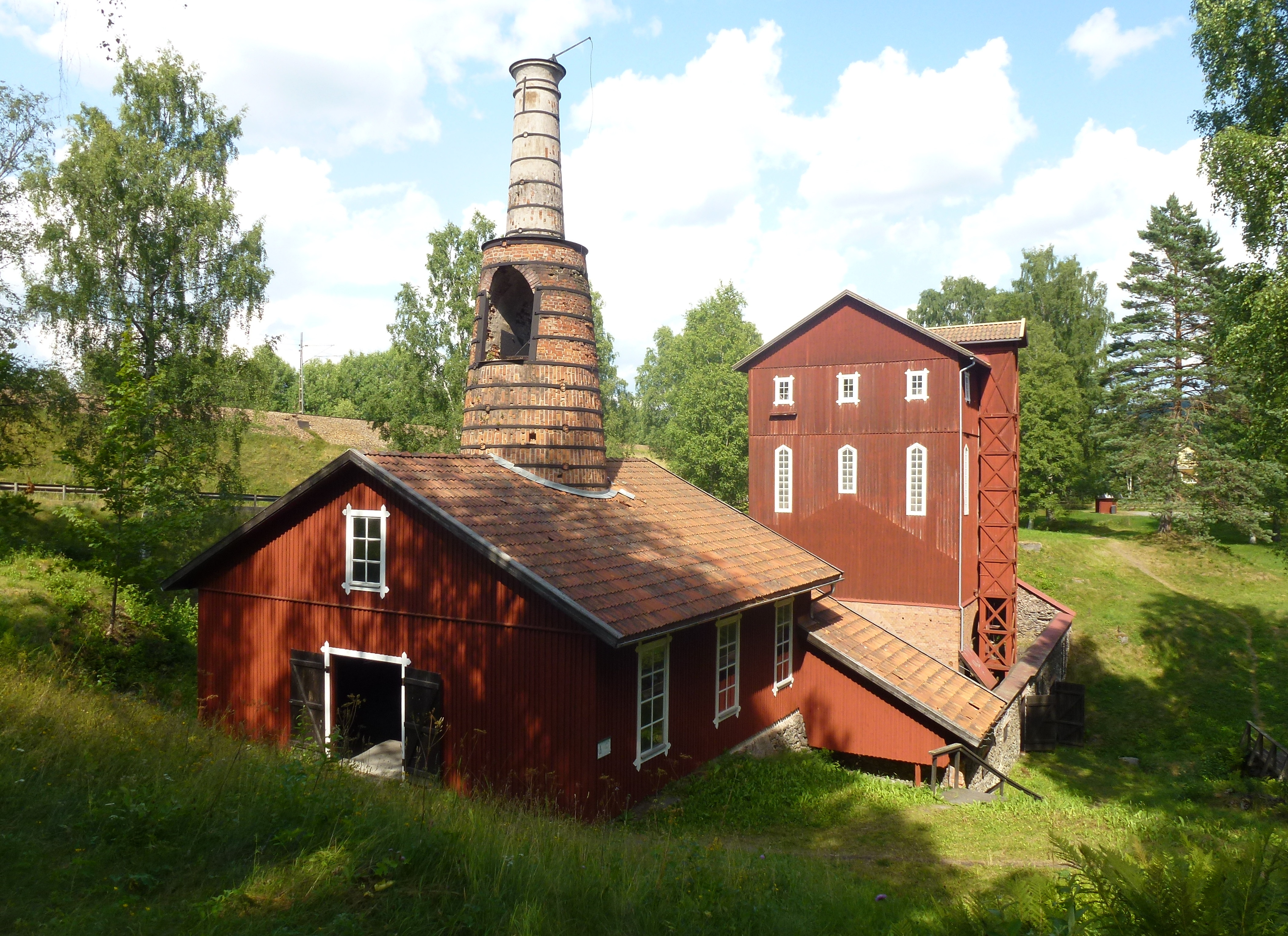
"Klenshyttan" in Ludvika Municipality

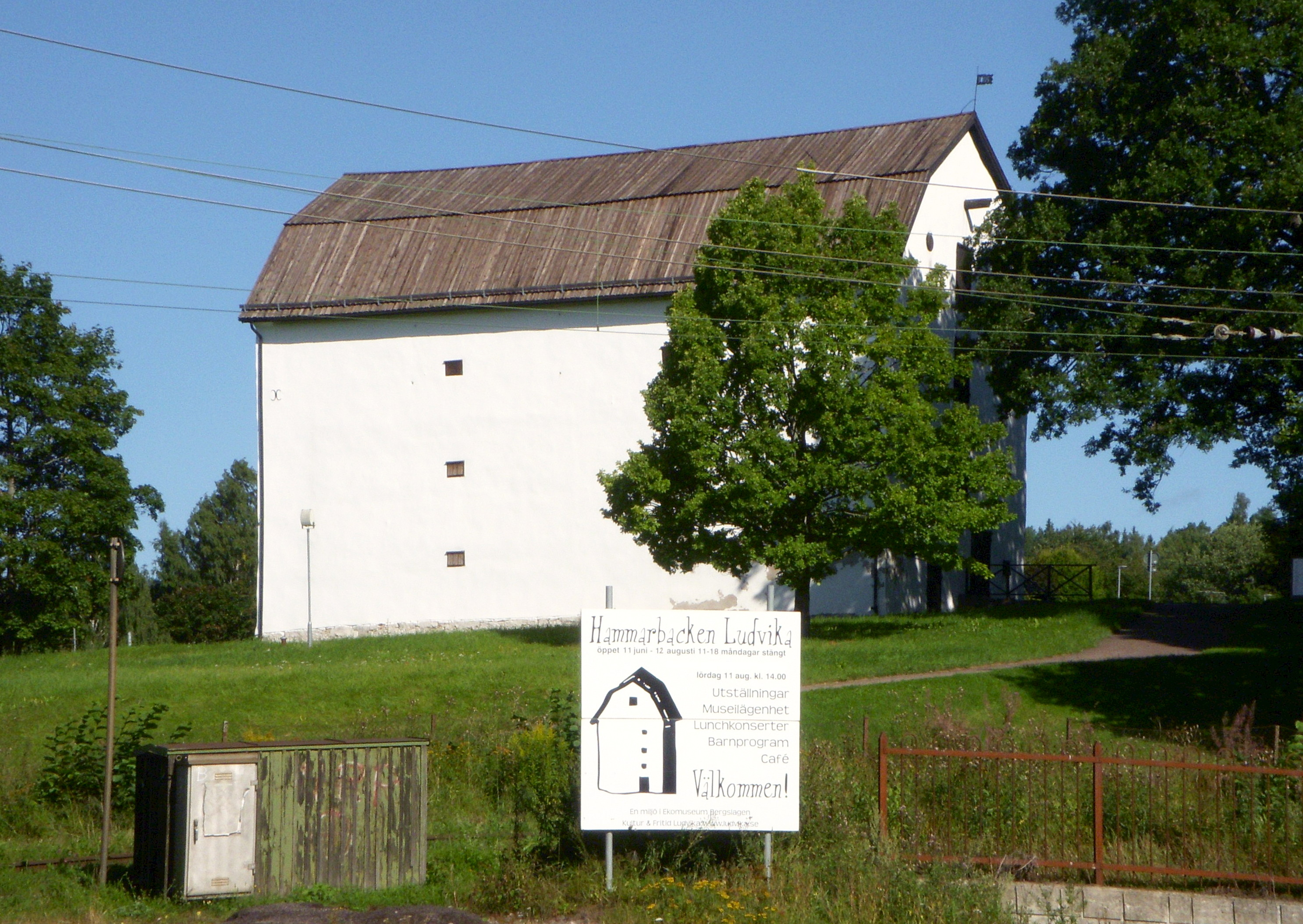
"Hammarbacken" in Ludvika

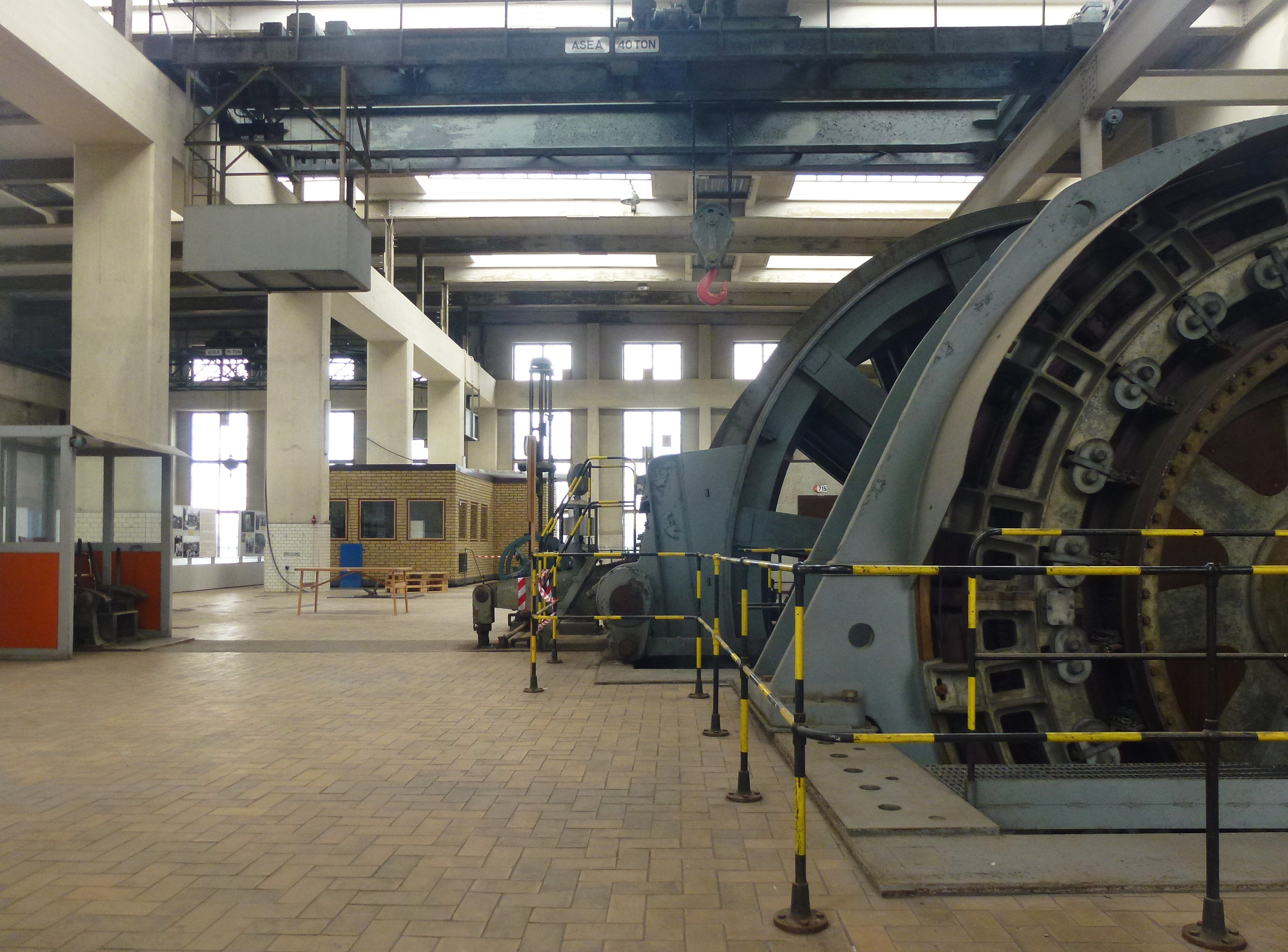
Mining area in Grängesbergsgruvan

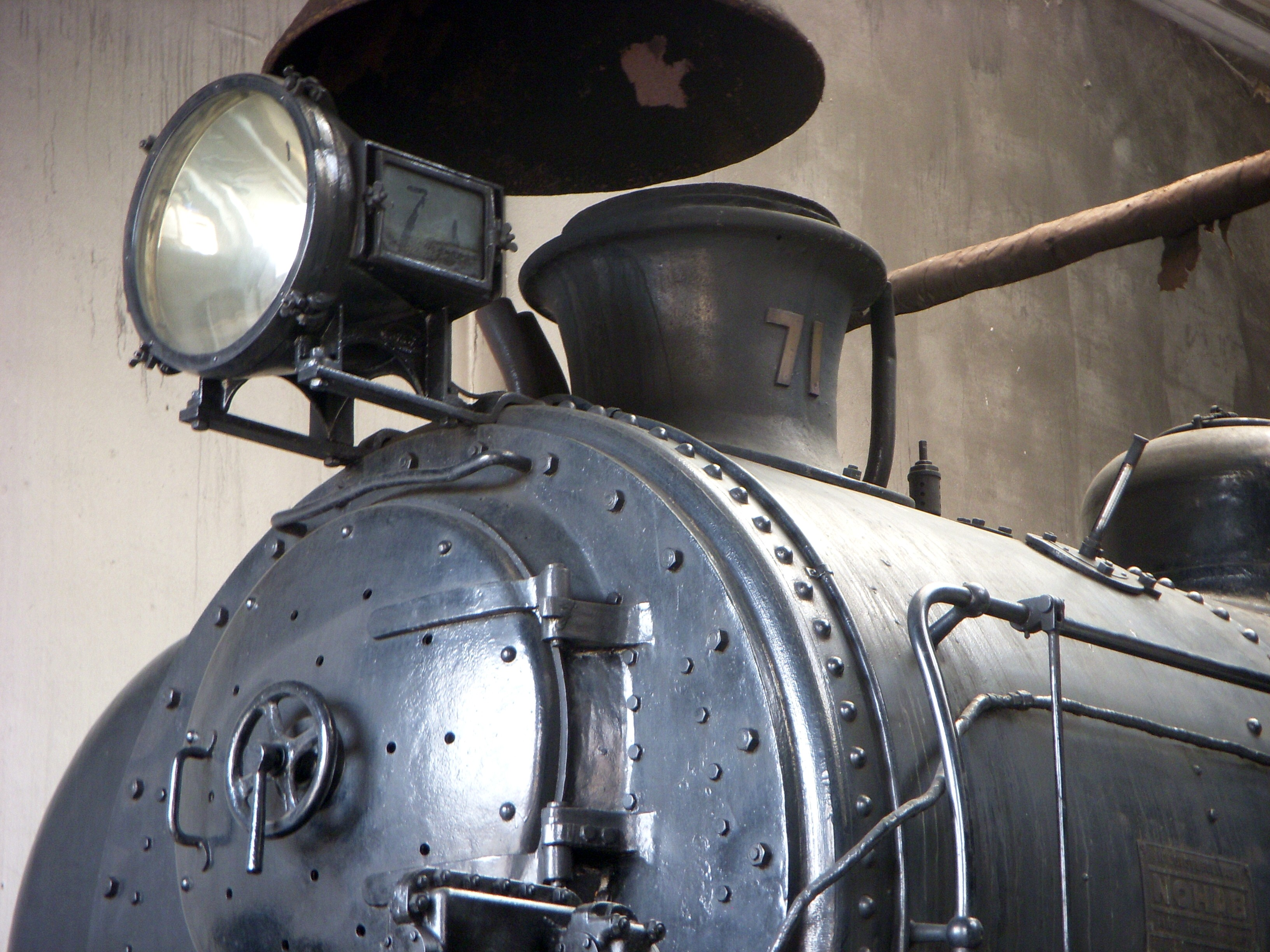
Railway museum Grängesberg

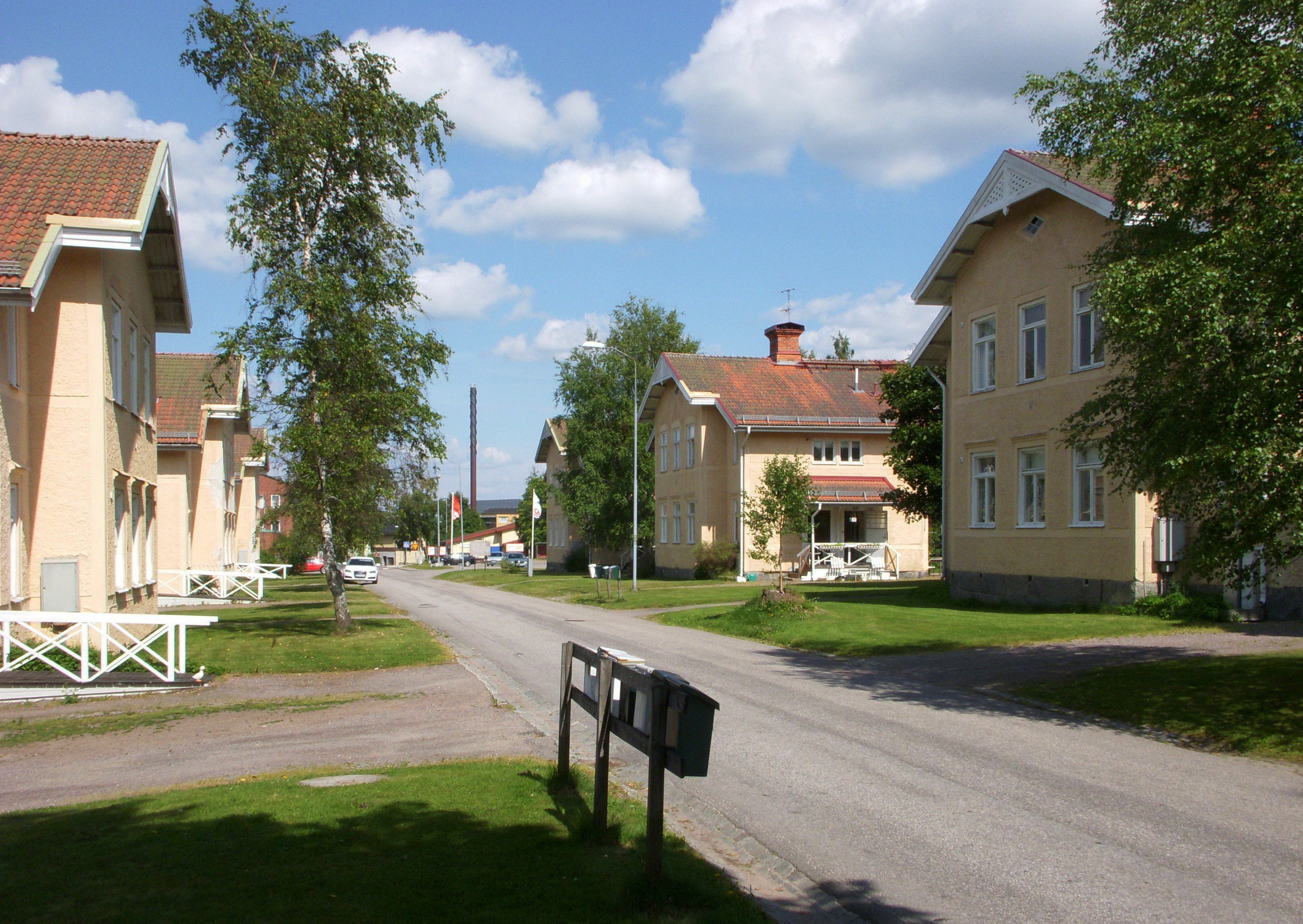
Workers' homes in Grängesberg

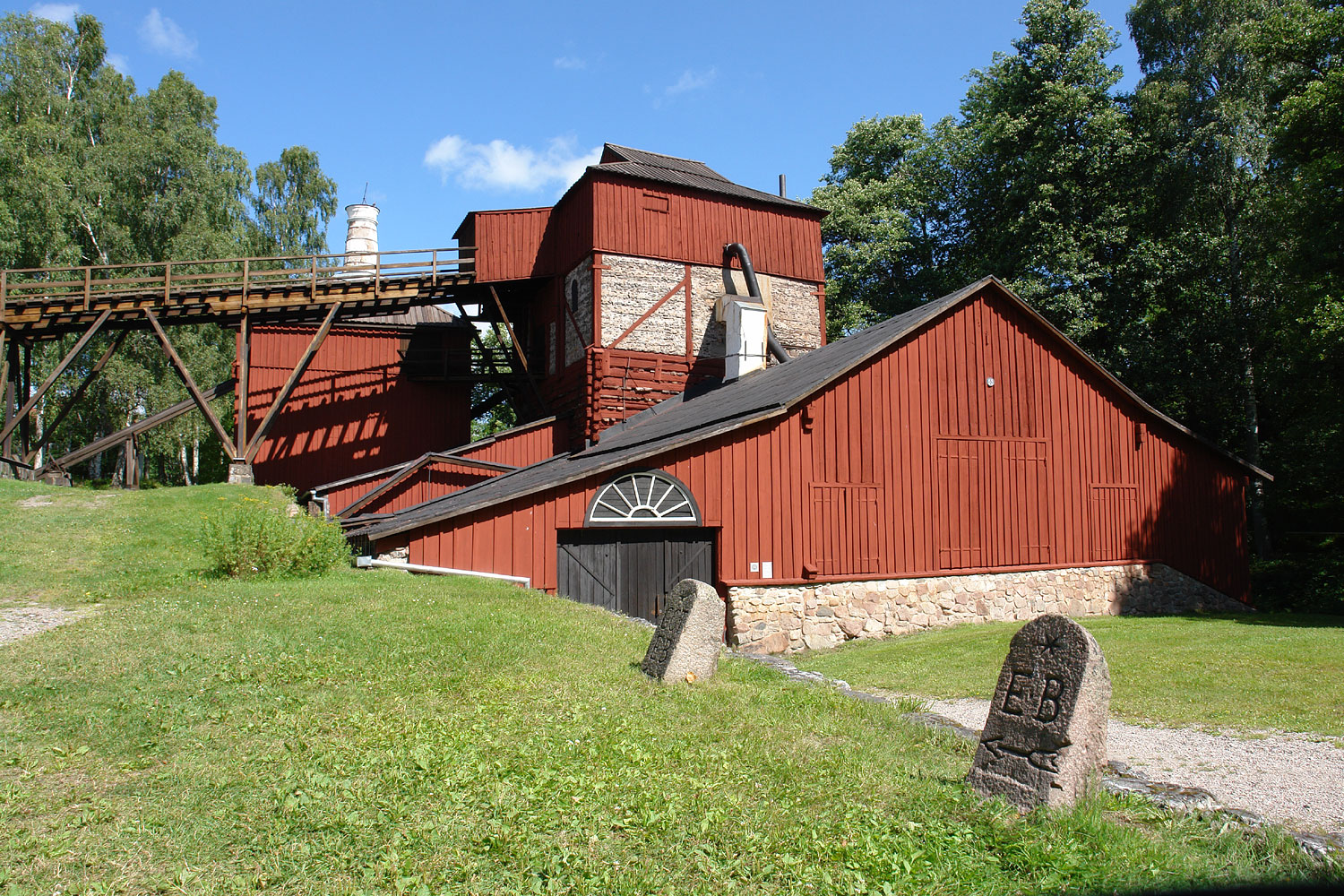
Engelsberg Ironworks
