= Lapphyttan =

Archaeological type site

Coordinates: 60°4′32.52″N 16°4′14.76″E

Lapphyttan or Lapphyttejarn in Norberg Municipality, Sweden, may be regarded as the type site for the Medieval Blast Furnace. Its date is probably between 1150 and 1350. It produced cast iron, which was then fined to make ferritic wrought iron cake or bun-like blooms. These were then cut into lumps for trade. It is thought that they correspond to the iron pieces known as osmonds. Osmonds occur in English Customs records in the 1250s and seem to be alluded to in a commercial treaty with Novgorod in 1203. Lapphyttan is a part of Ecomuseum Bergslagen.

Furnaces of this type have also been identified in Mark (Märkische Sauerland) in Westphalia and north of the Schwäbische Alb both in Germany.
