= Olof Arborelius =

Swedish painter (1842–1915)

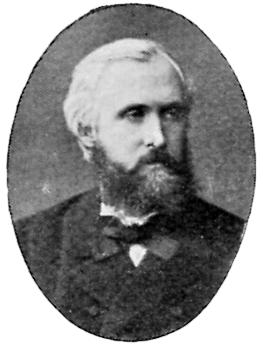
Olof Arborelius, from the Svenskt Porträttgalleri XX

Olof Per Ulrik Arborelius (4 November 1842 - 2 June 1915) was a Swedish landscape and genre painter. He served as a Professor at the Royal Swedish Academy of Fine Arts from 1902 to 1909.

== Biography ==
Arborelius was born in Orsa, Sweden. The Arborelius family was originally from Arboga and can be traced to the 16th century. His father, Olof Ulric Arborelius, was a priest and dialectologist. His mother, Charlotta Dorotea Friman (1817-1892), was his father's third wife. His younger brother, Rudolf Arborelius, was an architect. In 1873, he married his cousin, Hedvig Maria Arborelius (1853-1909). His grand-nephew is Roman Catholic cardinal Anders Arborelius.

He received a recommendation for the Royal Swedish Academy of Fine Arts from Johan Fredrik Höckert. After seven years of studying there, he took work in the studios of Edward Bergh, but soon received a travel grant that enabled him to embark on a three year study trip to Europe. He visited Paris, Munich and Rome and spent some time in Düsseldorf. While in Rome, he became associated with the Virtuosi al Pantheon.

When he returned to Stockholm he became a member candidate (agré) at the Academy. For many years, he was a Supervisor at the KTH Royal Institute of Technology (Kungliga Tekniska högskolan). In 1902, he was appointed a Professor of Landscape Painting at the Academy.

He was originally counted as a follower of the Düsseldorf School. During the 1880s, he began to express opposition to the prevailing styles of teaching, but never embraced impressionism, although he sharpened the colors in his palette. The illustrator, Fritz von Dardel, felt moved to criticize his use of the color green. He made extensive use of folk motifs from Dalarna. At the Venice Biennale of 1903, one of his works was purchased by King Victor Emmanuel.

His works may be seen at the Nationalmuseum and the Göteborgs konstmuseum, as well as at the Finnish National Gallery in Helsinki.

== Gallery ==
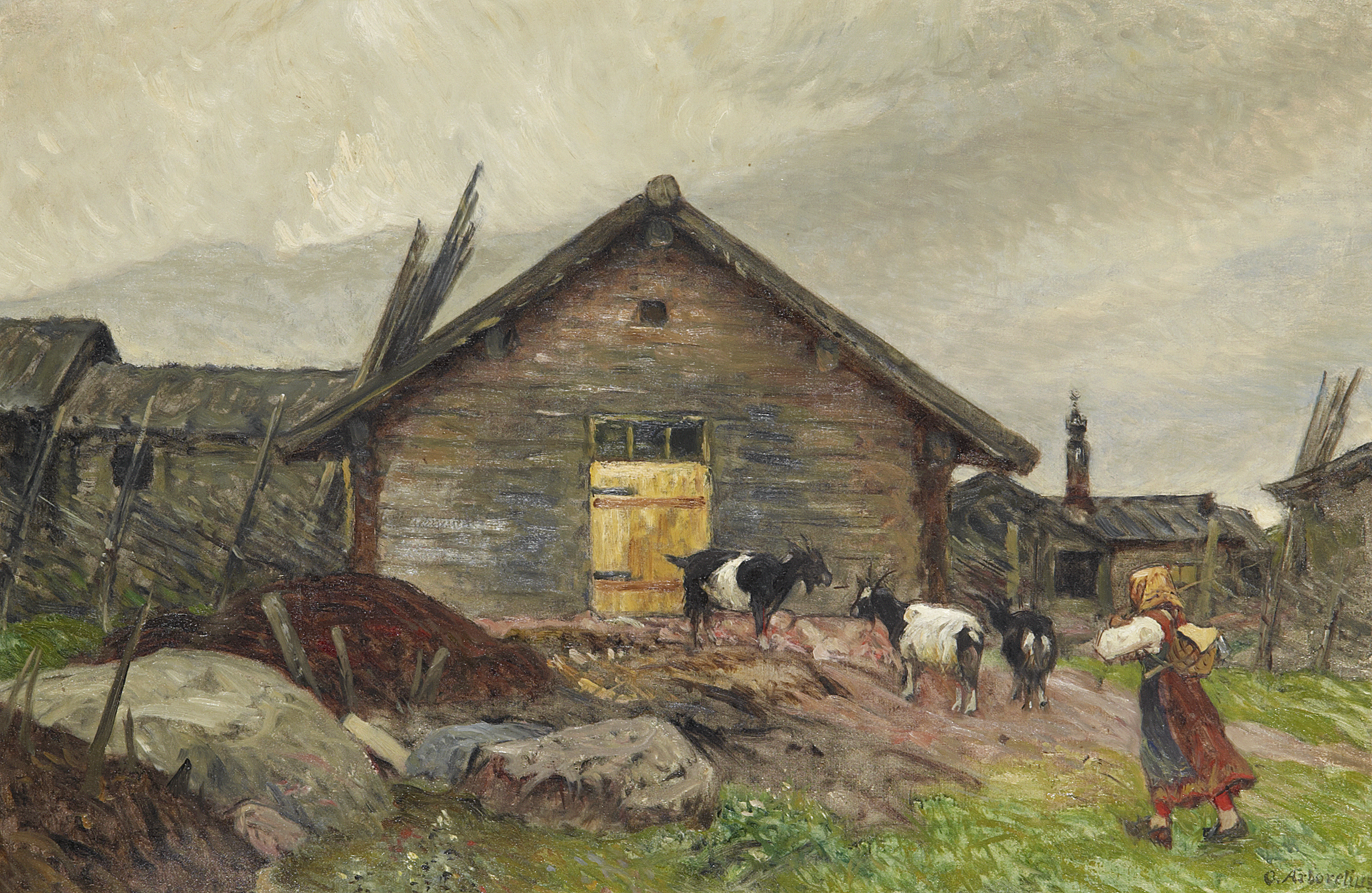
Girl with Goats
(date unknown)

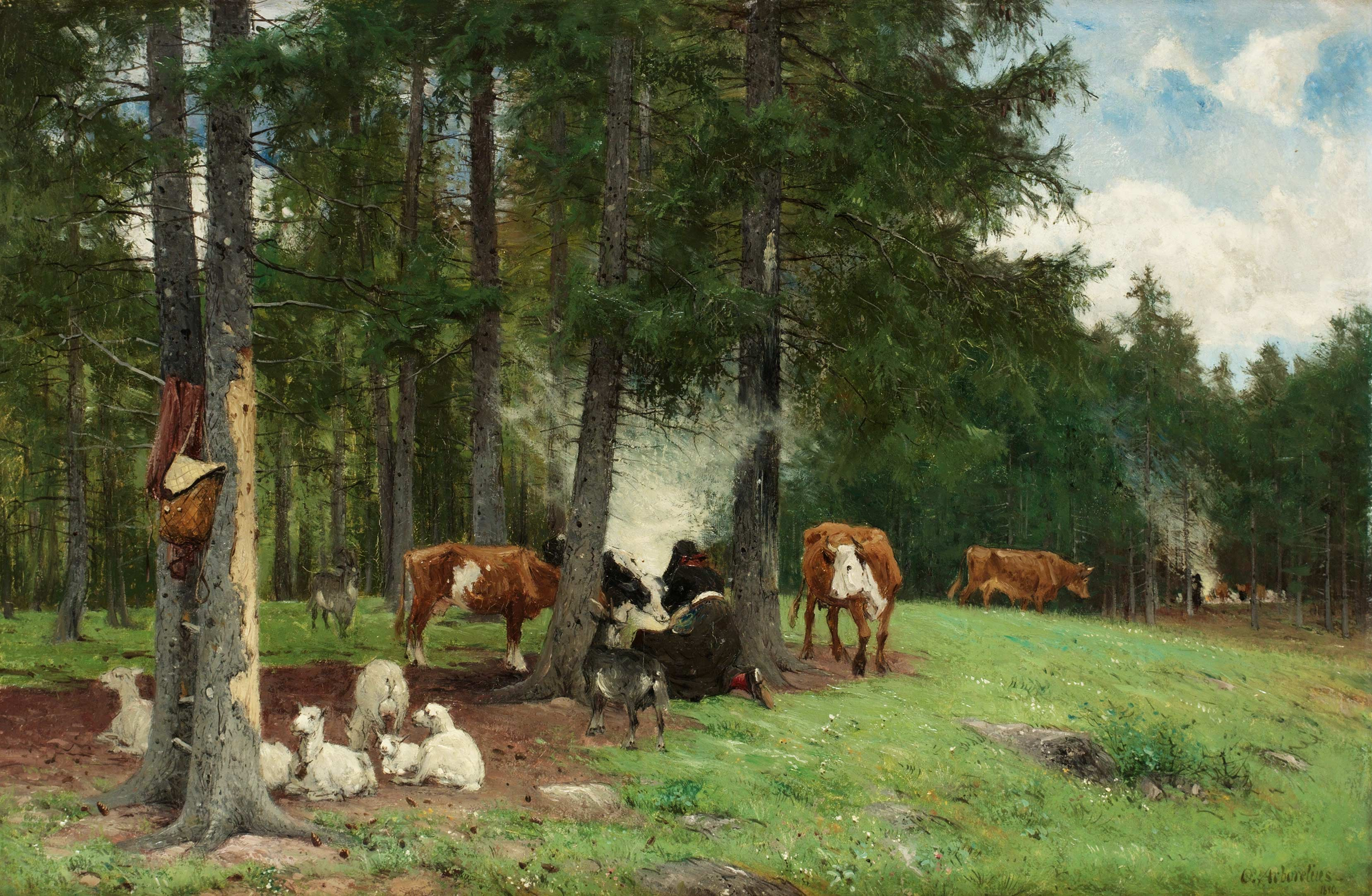
Girl with cattle
(1890)

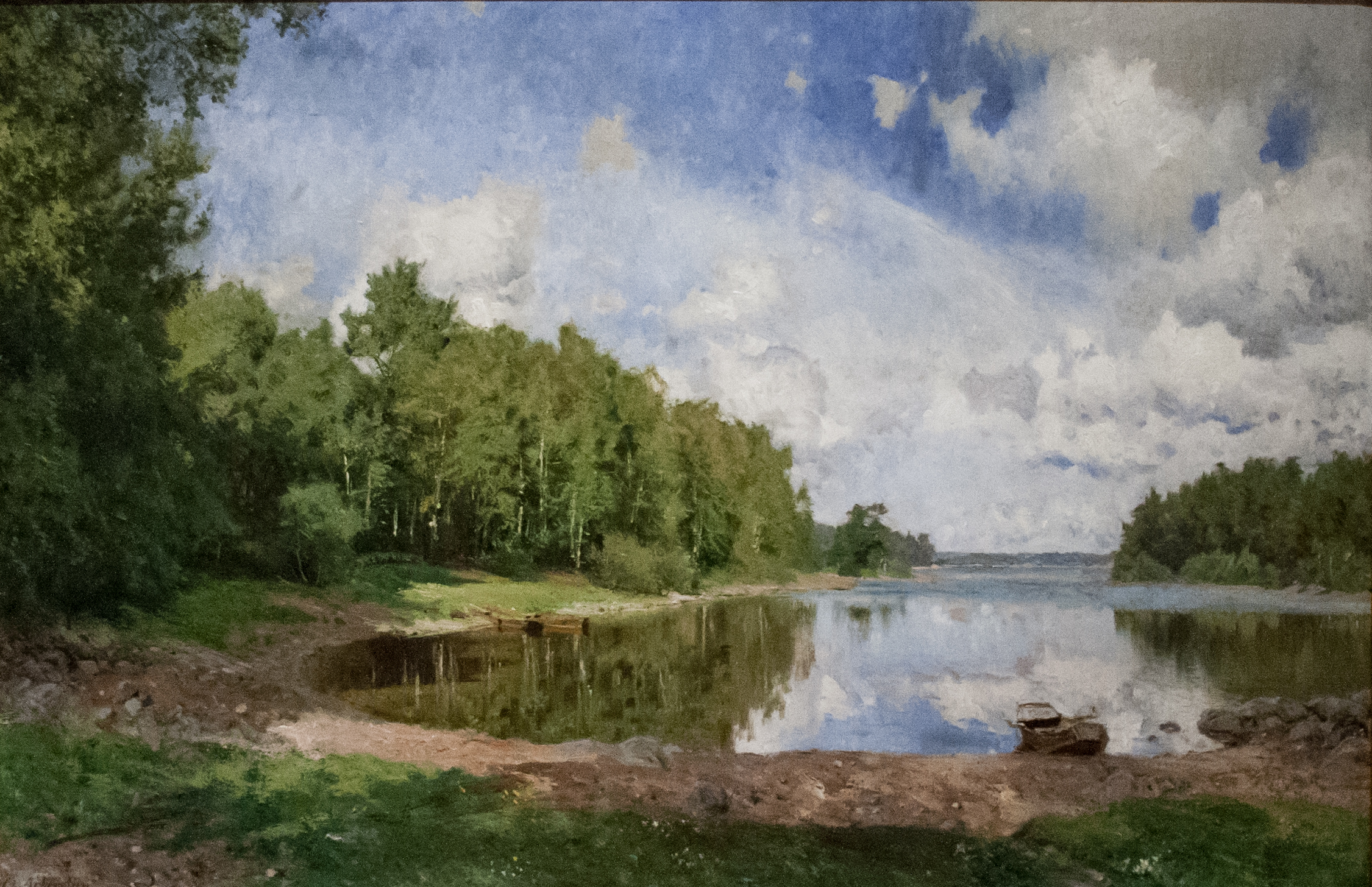
Lake view
(1893)

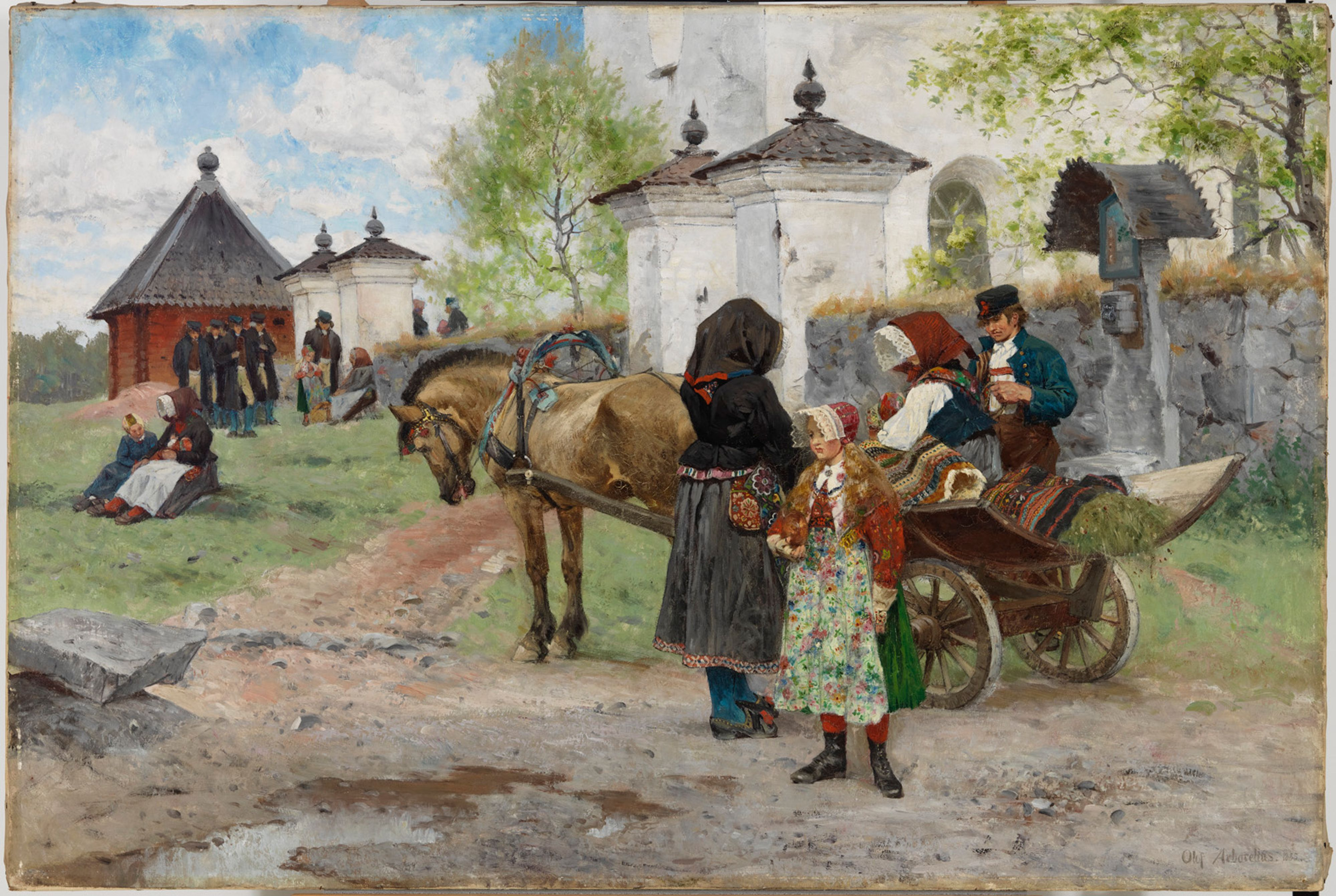
Sunday at Floda Church in Dalarna (1885)

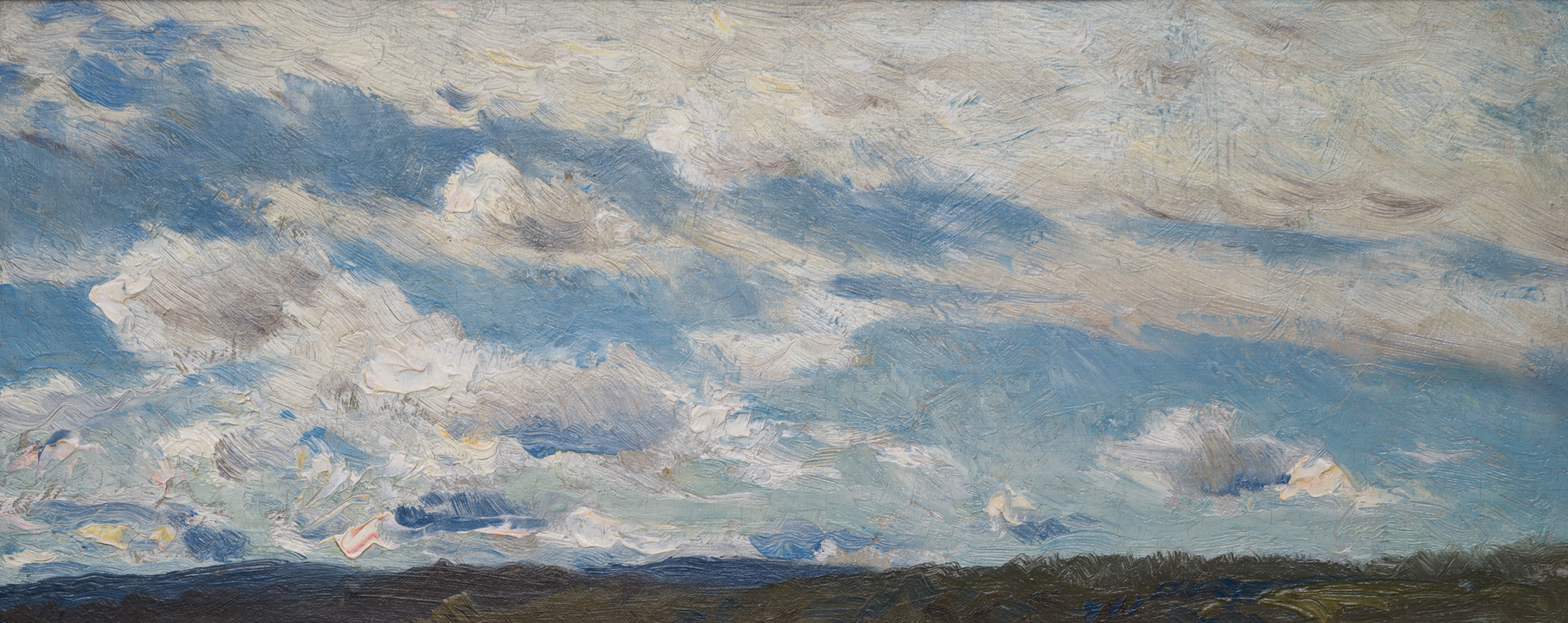
Cloud Study
