= Arvid Mauritz Lindström =

Swedish painter (1849–1923)

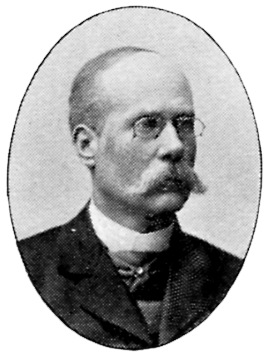
Arvid Mauritz Lindström

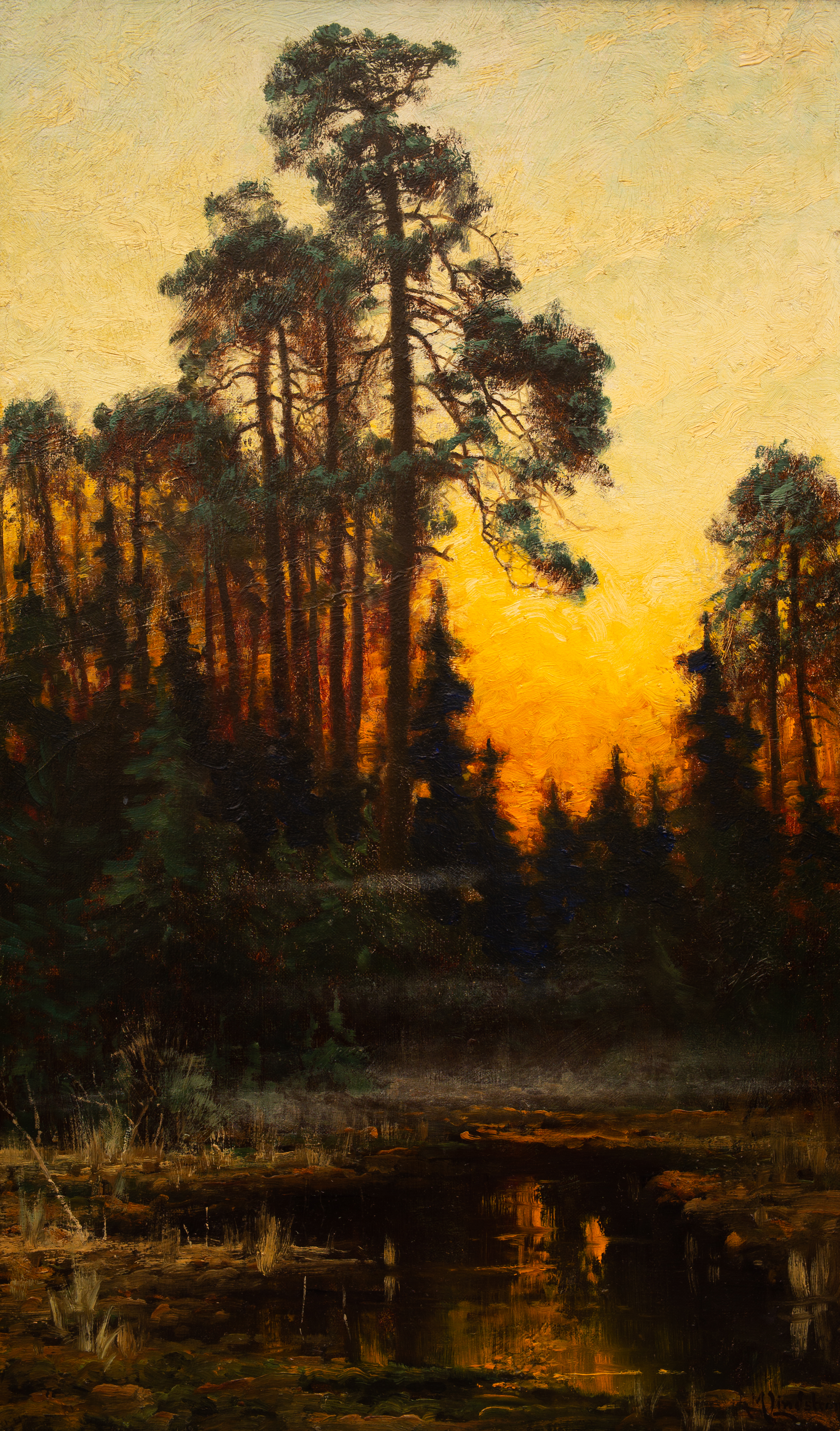
A Sunset in a Foggy Forest

Arvid Mauritz Lindström (26 April 1849 – 11 December 1923) was a Swedish painter. Lindström is best known today for his atmospheric landscapes.

== Biography ==
He was born in the parish of Björksta in Västmanland, Sweden. His parents were Per Fredrik Lindström and Hedvig Ringström. He studied at the Royal Swedish Academy of Arts in Stockholm in 1869–1872. He went to Munich and Paris to continue his studies. In 1877 Lindström became an apprentice (agré) at the Royal Swedish Academy of Fine Arts and in 1886 he joined the Art Association. He lived in England, mainly in London, from the early 1880s to 1889.

== Selected paintings ==
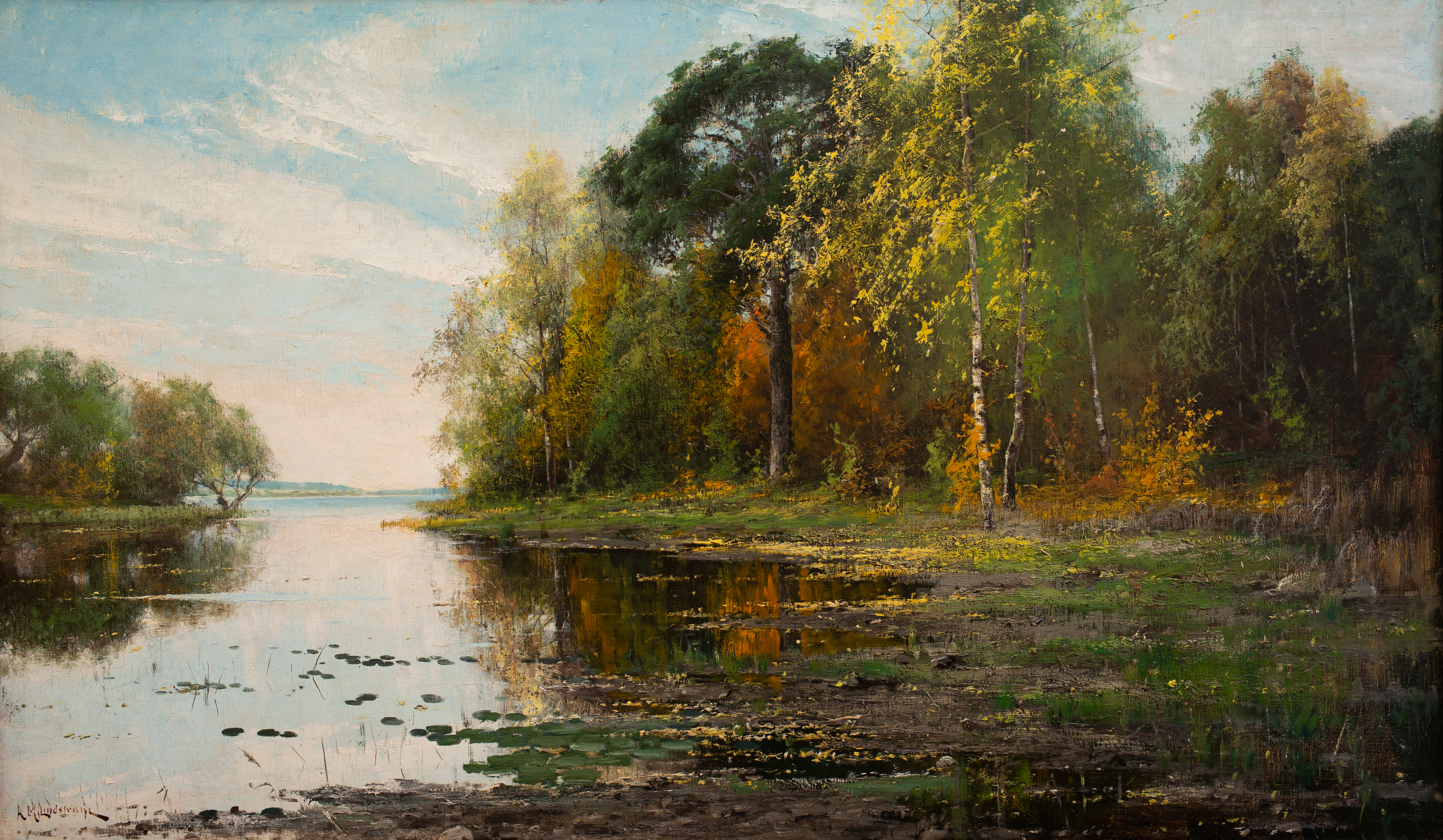
Lakeside Landscape in Autumn Colors

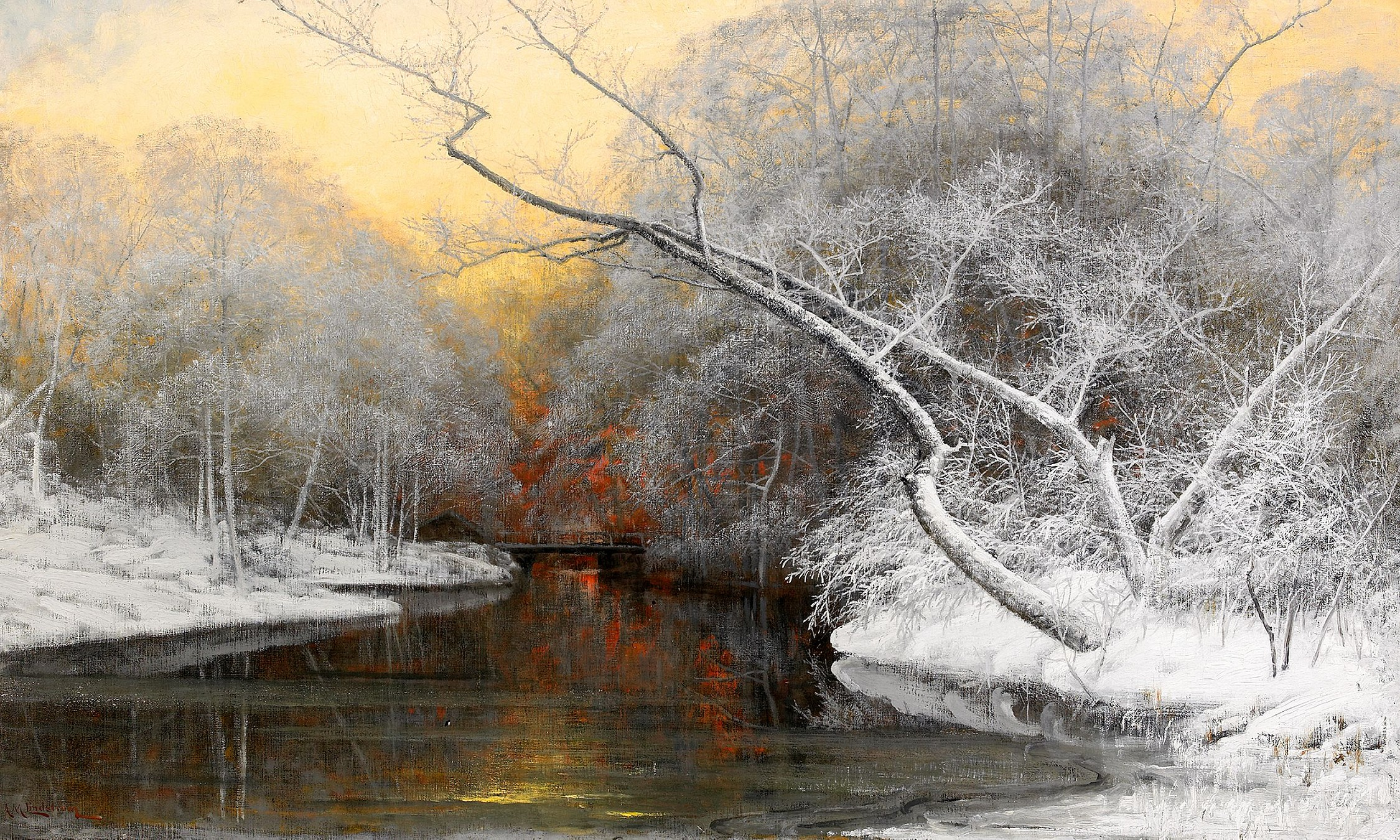
Nightfall over a Frosty Winter Landscape

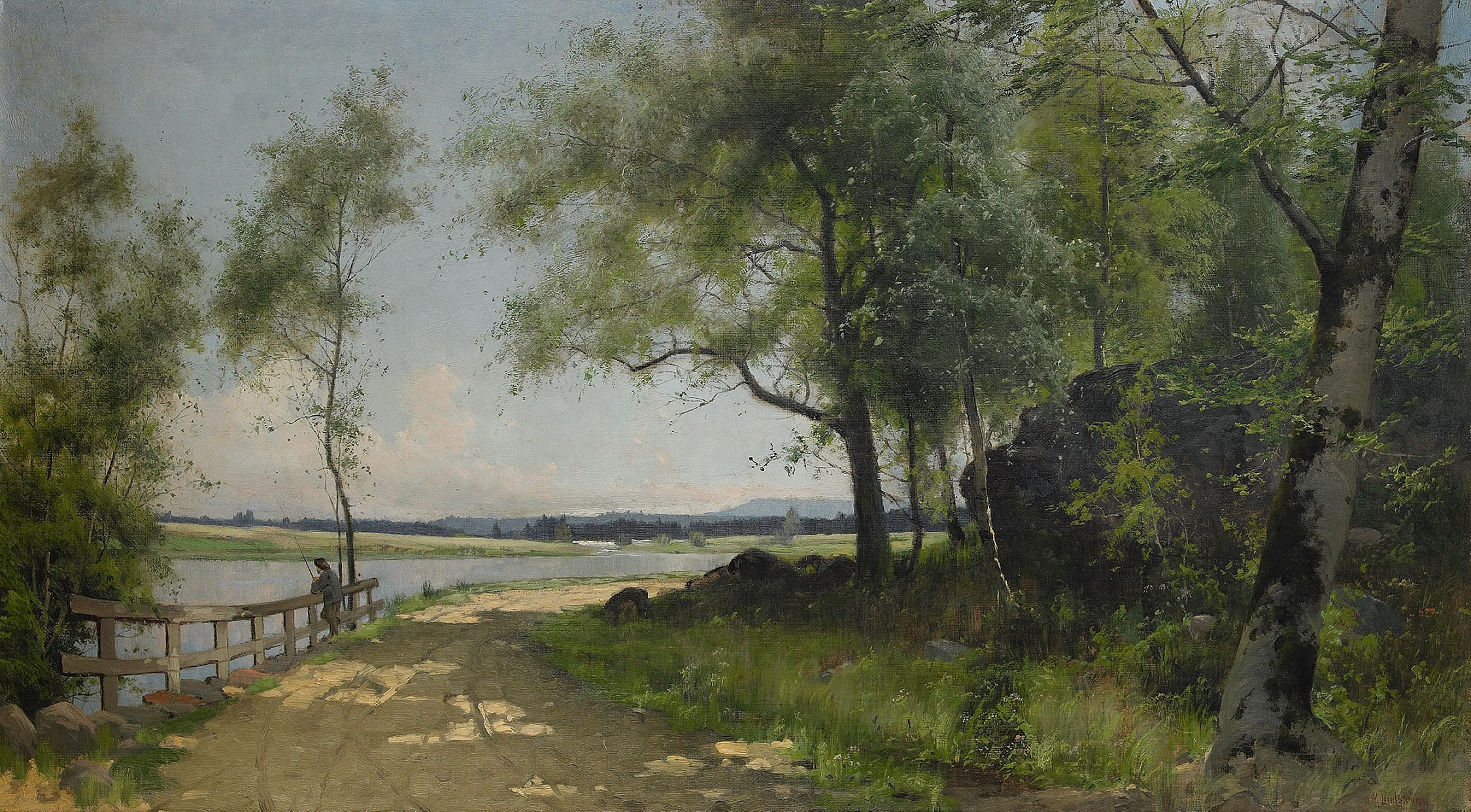
Summer Landscape with Road by the Water

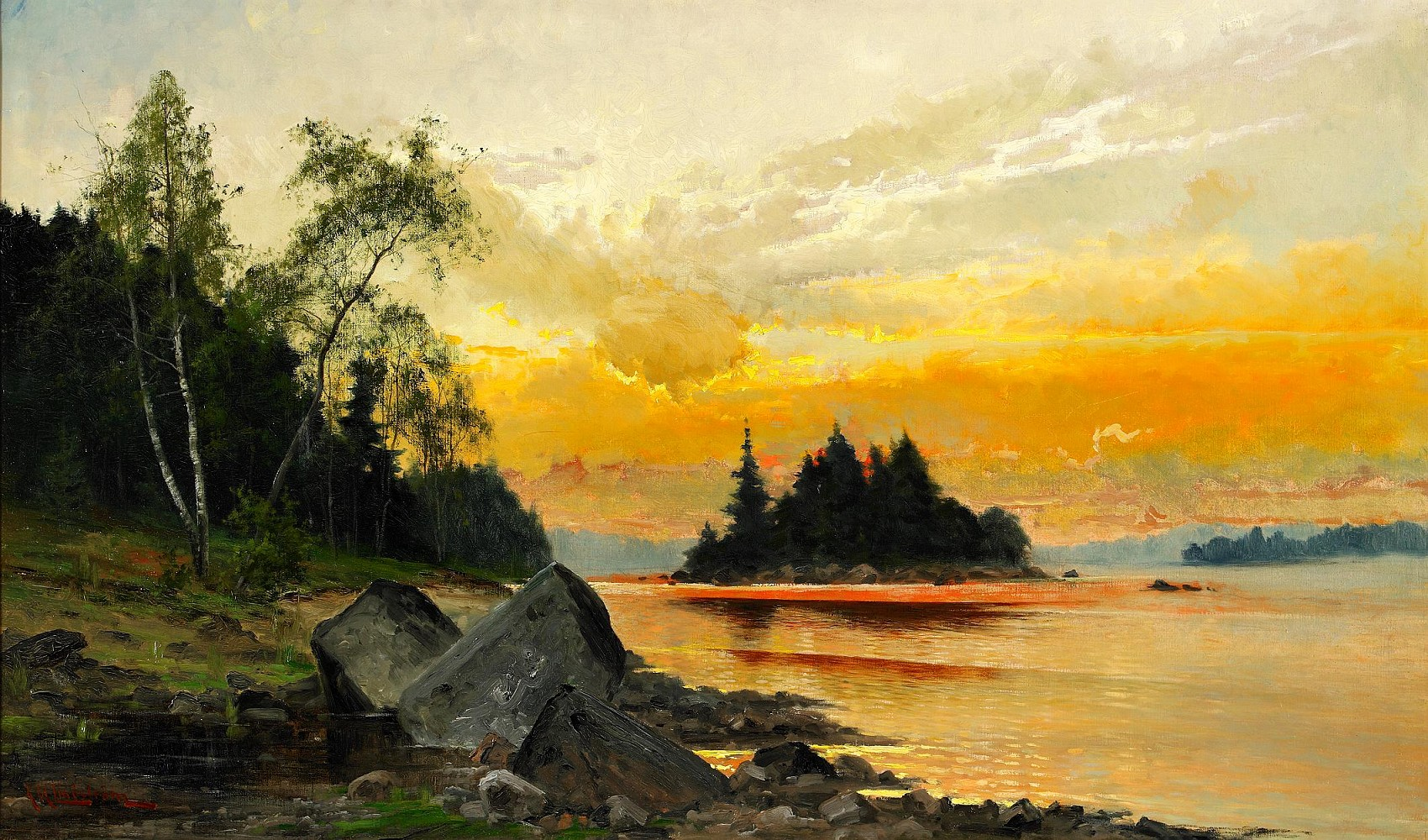
Evening by the Sea

== Other sources ==
- Mauritz Lindström, Nordisk familjebok
