= Industrial heritage =

Physical remains of the history of technology and industry

Industrial Heritage
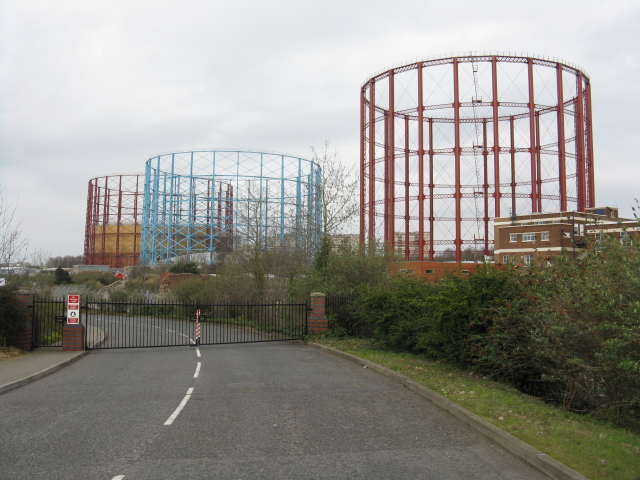
- physical and intangible legacy
- Type: Buildings, machinery, workshops, sites, and landscapes
- Location: Global

Site notes
- Governing body: UNESCO, TICCIH

Industrial heritage refers to the physical and intangible legacy of industrialisation, including buildings, machinery, workshops, sites, and landscapes of historical and technological significance. Stefan Berger and Steven High define industrial heritage as a field that not only preserves material remains but also reflects the socio-economic and cultural transformations brought by industrialisation.

Industrial heritage also includes sociofacts, such as aspects of social and institutional organizations, and mentifacts, comprising the attitudinal characteristics and value systems associated with industrial heritage sites, reflecting its interdisciplinary nature.

The industrial heritage of a region forms part of its cultural heritage, contributing to local identity by reflecting historical progress and developments. The scientific study of industrial remains is called industrial archaeology. In this field, the principal international organization dedicated to the study and preservation of industrial heritage is the International Committee for the Conservation of the Industrial Heritage, known as TICCIH. The United Nations Educational, Scientific and Cultural Organization (UNESCO) recognizes industrial heritage as a significant element of cultural heritage and provides international frameworks for the identification, protection, and management of key industrial sites.

The preservation and study of industrial heritage are partly motivated by a desire to promote innovation and ingenuity, as well as by efforts to address the consequences of irreversible loss.

== Historical development ==
Aerial imagery of abandoned cellulose factory "Attisholz Areal", Riedholz, Switzerland.

Recognition of industrial heritage has developed progressively over time. Initially, industrial remains were commonly viewed as derelict structures with little cultural value, often associated with ruin and neglect rather than historical significance. In Britain, attitudes toward industrial remains began to change gradually in the mid-20th century, as recognition of their historical significance developed and the foundation for industrial archaeology as a research approach was established.

In 1963, the Industrial Monuments Survey was established, later becoming the National Record of Industrial Monuments. In 1973, efforts to coordinate international perspectives on industrial heritage resulted in the founding of the International Committee for the Conservation of the Industrial Heritage (TICCIH). This initiative brought together scholars, professionals, and enthusiasts, fostering a global exchange of ideas and strategies, and contributing to clearer direction and broader recognition of the movement. These developments, along with the formation of the Association of Industrial Archaeology and the launch of the Industrial Archaeology Review journal in 1976, reflected a growing interest in documenting industrial heritage. Nonetheless, the field remained marginal within mainstream academia at the time.

Following World War II, widespread deindustrialization and industrial relocation contributed to a renewed interest in the preservation and study of industrial heritage. This trend, from the 1970s onward, resulted in the abandonment of numerous industrial facilities across Europe and North America, which in turn attracted growing attention from public and academic communities.

In the 2000s, UNESCO began to expand its recognition of industrial sites, incorporating them into the World Heritage List, thereby increasing international awareness and legitimacy of industrial heritage as a cultural category. In the 21st century, industrial heritage conservation has expanded beyond static preservation to include adaptive reuse and integration into sustainable urban development strategies. This shift reflects a broader recognition of the social, economic, and educational value industrial heritage can contribute to contemporary society.

== Value ==
=== Cultural value ===
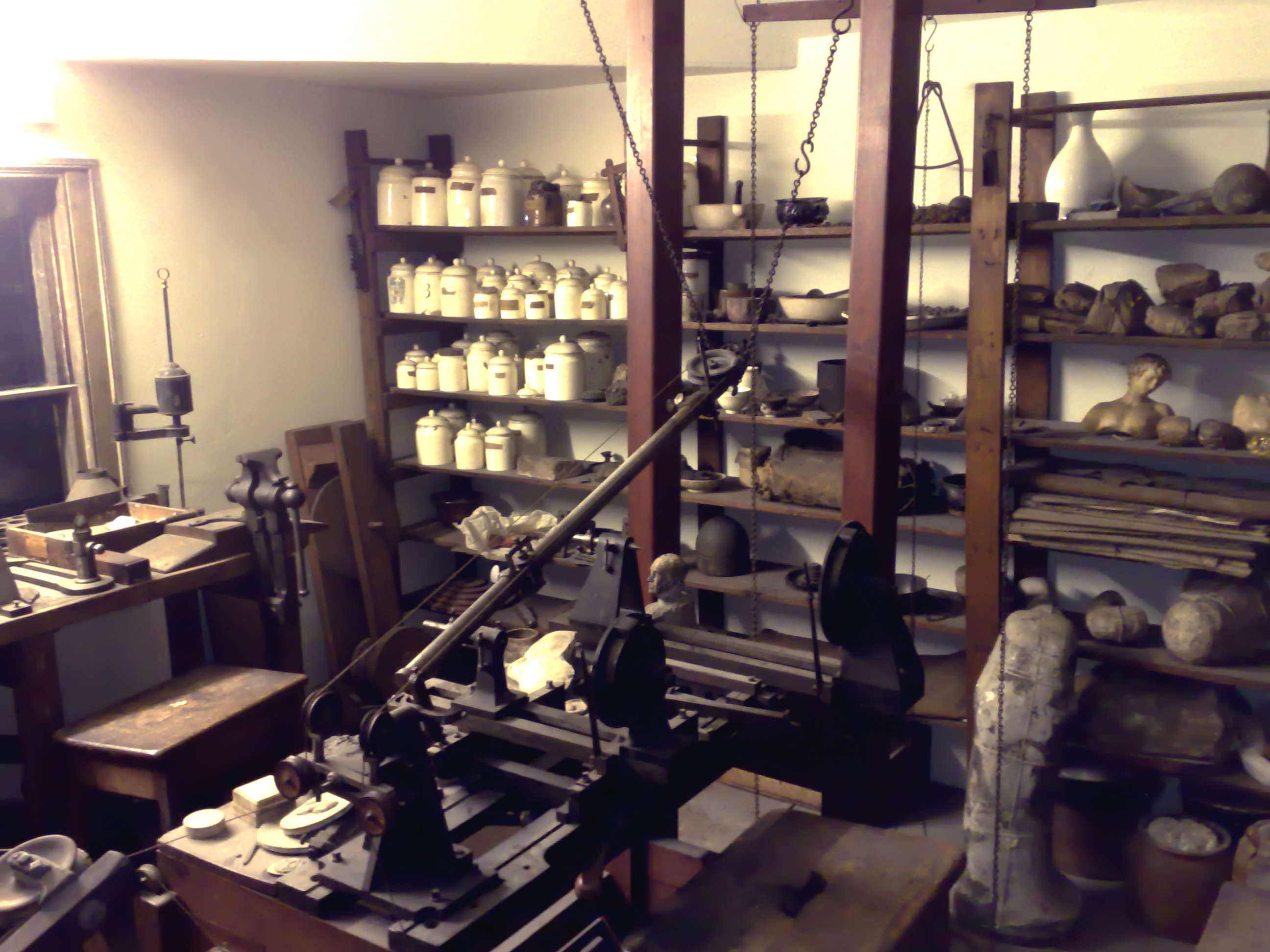
James Watt's workshop

Industrial heritage is increasingly recognised as part of cultural heritage due to its ability to reflect layers of historical, technological, and spatial development associated with past industrial societies. These post-industrial sites have been associated with community cultural identity, as they reflect different stages of history and earlier ways of life. As public perception of industrial sites has evolved, attention has increasingly turned to preserving both the material and immaterial aspects of industrial heritage, not solely for their architectural or technological interest, but also as cultural symbols linked to collective memory and identity. In this context, industrial landscapes are not only regarded as physical traces of past production systems but also as cultural narratives reflecting the evolution of social organisation, regional change, and shared urban memory. Their preservation enables communities to maintain and shape cultural identity and to recognise these spaces as witnesses to collective experiences, struggles, and transformations. By 2012, thirty-six of the forty-six industrial sites inscribed on the UNESCO World Heritage List were located in Europe, indicating its recognition on a global scale.

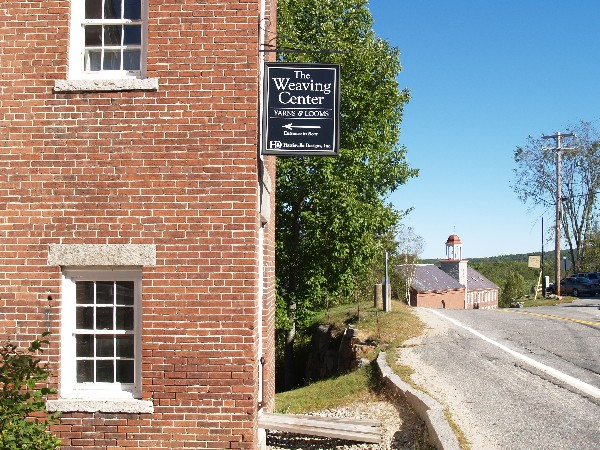
Harrisville Historic District, New Hampshire, USA

=== Social value ===
Industrial heritage contributes to preserving the historical memory of working communities by maintaining connections to former work environments and everyday practices. Local efforts to safeguard these sites often involve educational and participatory activities, helping to strengthen social identity and continuity. Volunteer involvement and long-term engagement in industrial heritage projects underscore its potential to promote cohesion and collective responsibility in communities.

In some cases, preservation efforts emphasise the educational function of industrial sites, making use of historical materials and original technical systems to support the interpretation of the social history of labour and technology. In addition, some industrial heritage sites have been used to promote community engagement and to present local traditions and historical culture through festivals, exhibitions, and experiential projects. These activities have been found to strengthen residents' sense of belonging to their hometowns and provide opportunities for intergenerational exchange. As a result, industrial heritage functions not only as a cultural asset but also as a living social resource that supports civic pride and multigenerational participation.

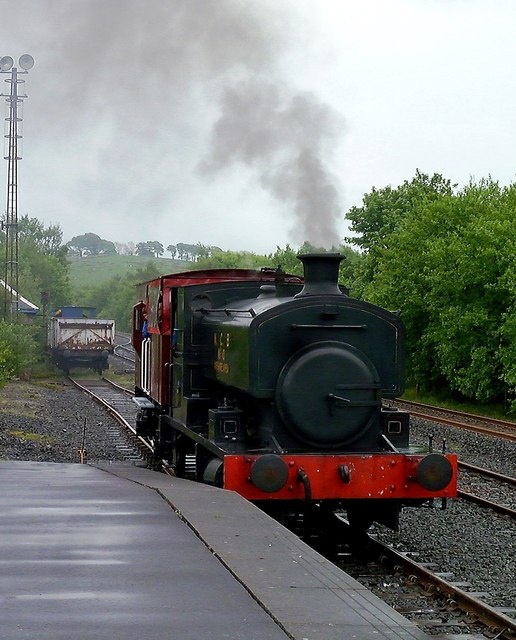
Scottish Industrial Railway Centre, Scotland

=== Economic value ===
Industrial heritage is considered a testament to the economic driving force of industrial development and is recognised for its ongoing relevance in contemporary urban development. The formation and expansion of industry typically require substantial investments of human, material, and financial resources. The preservation of industrial heritage has been recognised as a means to avoid resource waste. Such efforts may reduce the conversion of heritage sites into construction waste, including both land consumption and financial costs.

The adaptive reuse of industrial heritage has been associated with the economic renewal of urban decline areas. Transforming industrial sites into tourist, leisure, and commercial centres has created new job opportunities and promoted local development, helping to sustain regional economic activity and contribute to growth. The mining areas of Almadén and Sabero in Spain underwent transformations through the development of industrial heritage tourism, which has contributed to local economic development. These projects have simultaneously enhanced the historical value of these cities and fostered new vitality and momentum within them.

=== Environmental value ===
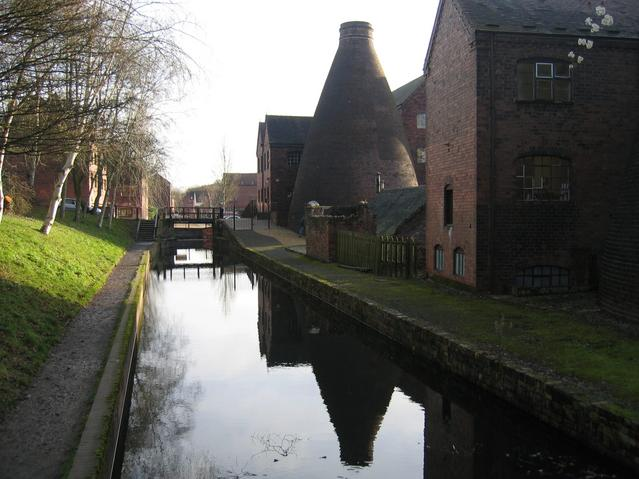
Coalport China Museum

Industrial heritage is regarded as having the potential to contribute to sustainable development from an environmental perspective. Many former industrial sites previously affected by pollution have been remediated and redeveloped into areas that support ecological restoration and public use. These changes have contributed to improved urban environmental conditions and provided additional spaces for community activities.

The Lowell Industrial Heritage Site in Massachusetts, United States, has been redeveloped into an urban park system that combines recreational, cultural, and ecological functions through ecological renewal projects involving the restoration of waterways, green spaces, and built structures. Similar cases indicate that the reuse of industrial heritage often includes the restoration of the surrounding natural environment, particularly in former industrial areas situated along riverbanks or ports, where green infrastructure becomes a key element of redevelopment. Such projects may support land conservation, limit further urban expansion, and reduce the impact on natural areas. Through environmentally oriented redevelopment, industrial heritage has gained increased visibility in contemporary urban regeneration.

== Challenges and current state ==
=== Property rights issues ===
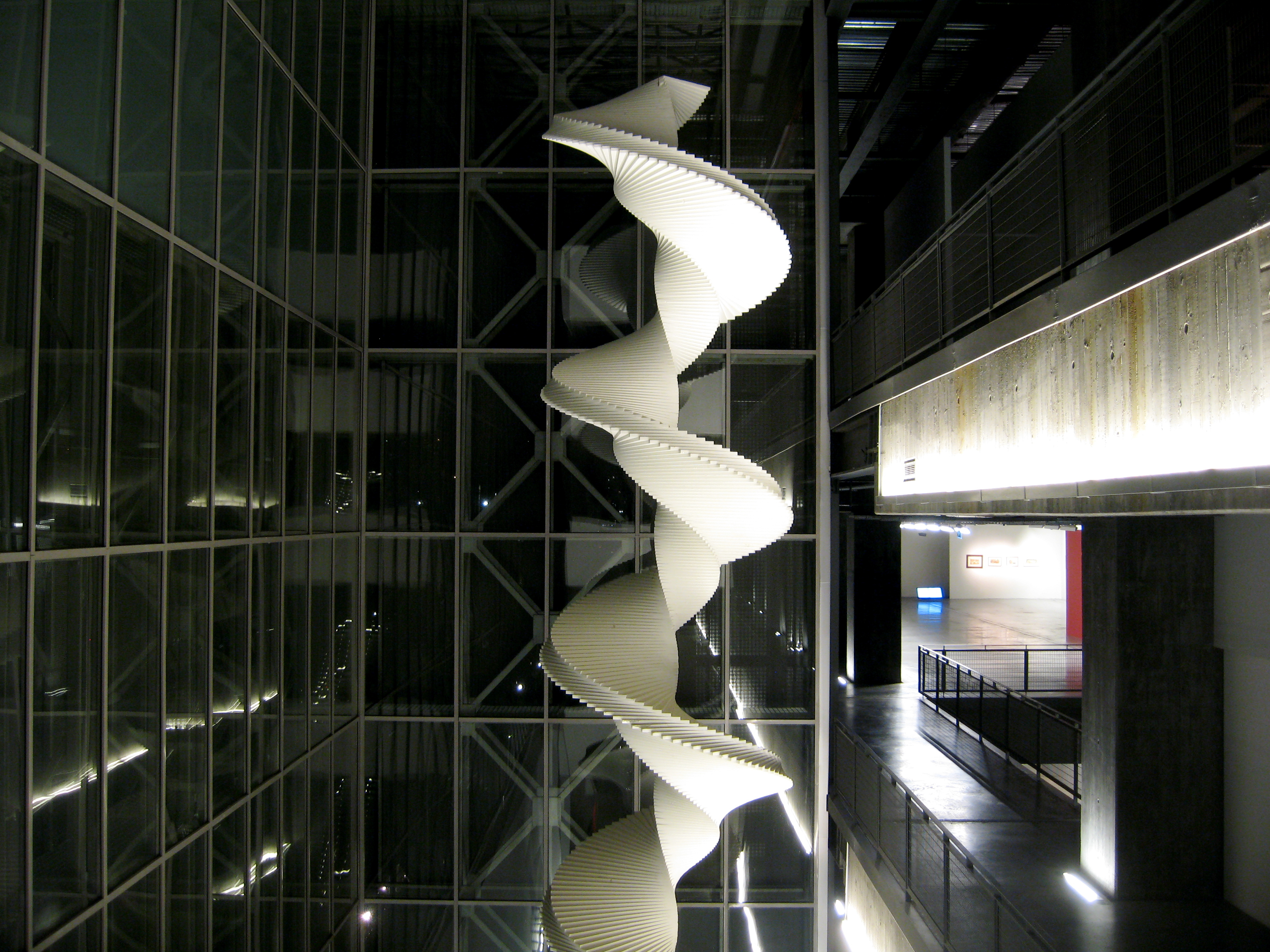
SantralIstanbul, Turkey

Many industrial heritage sites are under private ownership, limiting public authority over their preservation and future use. When protection rights are held by private individuals, public institutions may face limitations in coordinating reuse strategies or facilitating the interpretation of the site.

Because governments often lack legal rights to intervene in privately owned properties, public preservation efforts are limited to sites where owners are willing to collaborate. Some legal systems require owner consent before listing heritage sites, further restricting the role of public agencies. This has led to situations where historically significant sites have been neglected or demolished, even when they pose no obstruction to future development.

Inconsistent ownership and discontinuity in site management can contribute to gaps in heritage stewardship and pose challenges to long-term conservation efforts. Private ownership may prioritise short-term economic returns associated with redevelopment over the long-term objectives of heritage conservation. In the absence of supportive legal frameworks or public-private partnerships, industrial heritage sites may undergo commercially driven redevelopment, with limited attention given to their cultural significance, resulting in irreversible losses of heritage assets.

=== Insufficient resources ===
Preserving industrial heritage often presents substantial financial challenges. Many industrial structures were purpose-built for specific machinery or production processes, and their substantial scale and long-term disrepair can complicate efforts to adapt them for new uses. Because industrial buildings are often larger than residential or commercial properties, their maintenance involves significant and complex costs, including routine tasks such as roof repairs and window restoration, as well as more specialised interventions. Some sites are additionally affected by environmental contamination or residual industrial waste, which contributes to increased costs and complexity in conservation efforts.

Maintenance and renovation work postponed by owners due to operational challenges may lead to higher repair costs following site closure. Potential new users may be discouraged by the maintenance risks and the perceived inefficiency associated with the extensive amount of vacant space in these buildings.

In many cases, national and regional preservation bodies focus their attention on more traditional forms of heritage, such as monuments or domestic architecture, while industrial sites receive limited institutional support. In areas where industrial decline has led to reduced tax revenue and population loss, the ability to fund preservation efforts is further weakened. As a result, some industrial heritage sites are left abandoned or demolished due to a lack of funding and long-term planning.

=== Excessive commercialization ===
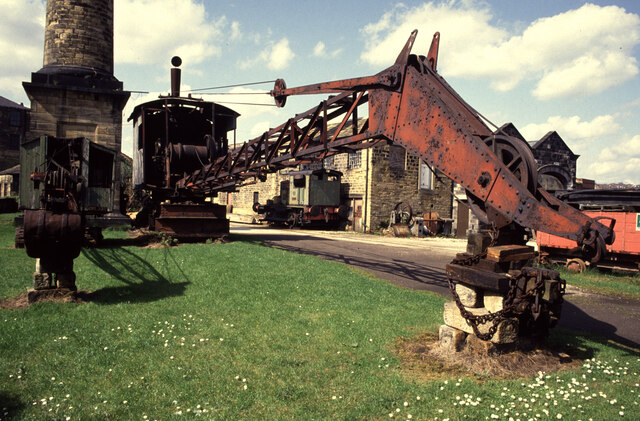
Leeds Industrial Museum at Armley Mills

While adaptive reuse of industrial sites has become a common strategy, excessive commercial development can compromise their historical and cultural integrity. In some instances, redevelopment efforts have caused irreversible harm to both the physical fabric of the site and its environmental surroundings. Striking a balance between economic use and heritage value remains a central concern.

Commercial reuse strategies for industrial heritage are often oriented toward economic outcomes, which may reduce the depth of historical interpretation and affect the preservation of cultural significance. Some sites may be transformed into cultural heritage themed environments to cater to tourism, in which the complexity of history is simplified or romanticized. This approach may reduce the capacity of industrial heritage to reflect social memory and labour history, particularly when local narratives are replaced by generic commercial representations.

An overemphasis on aesthetic renewal and visitor experience may obscure the socio-political histories embedded in industrial landscapes. Such transformations may result in a “flattening” of memory, in which complex or contested pasts are omitted in favour of more commercially appealing narratives. These challenges highlight the need for a comprehensive planning approach that takes into account both the economic potential and the heritage significance of industrial sites.

== Protection of industrial heritage ==
=== Legal protection ===
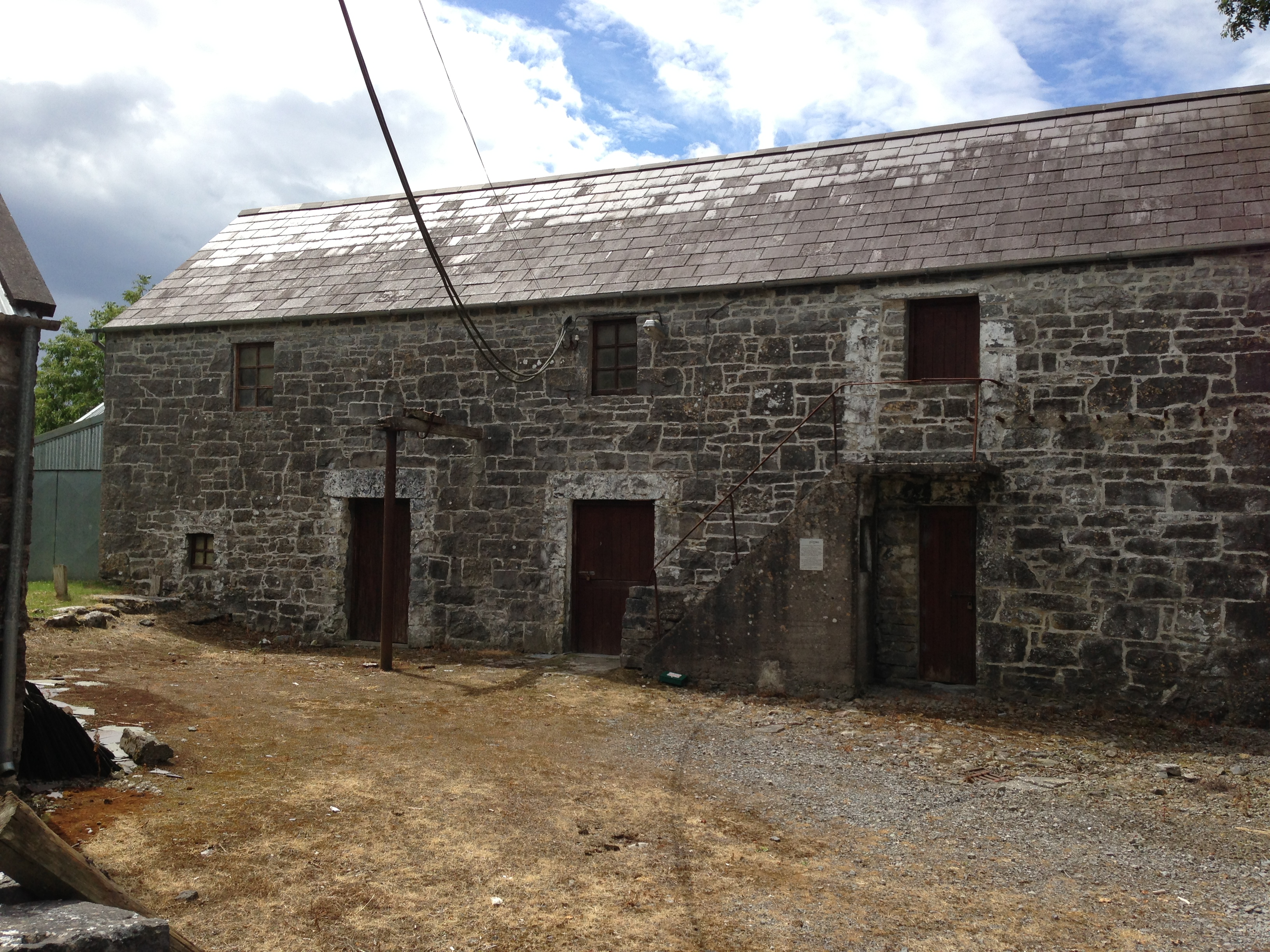
Bunnadober Mill, County Mayo, Ireland

Legal protection plays a crucial role in the safeguarding of industrial heritage. In the United Kingdom, this process began with the Ancient Monuments Acts of 1883, which were initially concerned with archaeological remains rather than industrial structures. However, as awareness of the historical value of industrial sites grew, the scope of legal protection expanded during the mid-20th century. By the 1960s, national surveys and the creation of the National Record of Industrial Monuments helped to systematically identify and evaluate such sites. In the 1980s, the Monuments Protection Programme further formalised this approach, leading to the designation of thousands of industrial sites for legal protection.

Over time, the development of legal frameworks and institutional surveys enabled a more structured and consistent system for recognising and preserving industrial heritage.

Once legal protection measures are in place, sustainable management becomes essential to ensure that sites remain accessible, retain their significance, and accommodate new uses without compromising their heritage value. Such frameworks can also support urban regeneration by facilitating the redevelopment of former industrial areas and contributing to broader community development objectives.

=== Adaptive reuse ===
In addition to legal protections, adaptive reuse has become a widely implemented strategy, involving the repurposing of former industrial spaces for contemporary use while retaining key elements of their historical and architectural character. Adaptive reuse enables heritage sites to remain functional and relevant in modern society.

Such reuse strategies are typically driven by aims of economic renewal and environmental sustainability, though many projects place disproportionate emphasis on visual impact and architectural aesthetics, while giving limited consideration to the deeper historical significance and industrial context. The challenge lies in maintaining a balance between conservation and contemporary use, ensuring that alterations do not compromise the industrial character of the site. Such transformations are often regarded as sustainable approaches that support the continued relevance and accessibility of historic buildings, while enabling the transmission of cultural heritage to future generations.

Despite these limitations, adaptive reuse has contributed to community revitalisation, attracted investment to economically declining areas, and redefined formerly abandoned sites as local landmarks. For instance, in Norberg, Sweden, a former pithead winding house was converted into a theatre, retaining the original industrial structure and acoustics while serving new cultural functions.

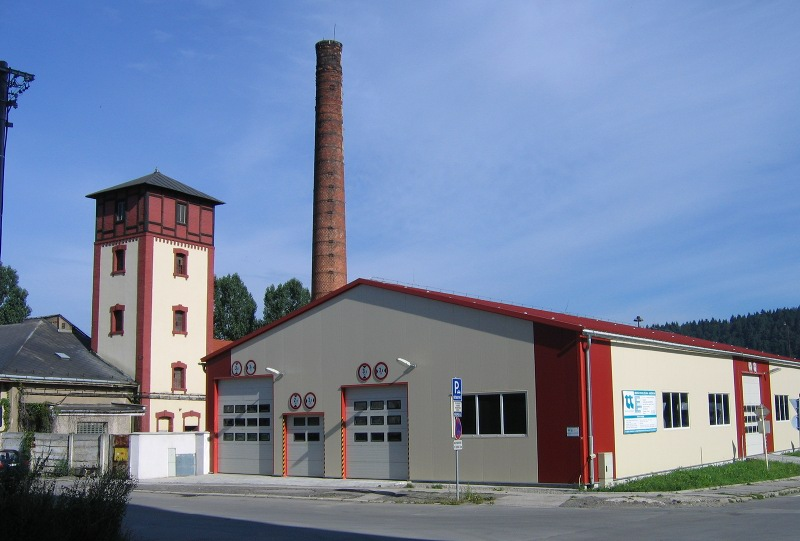
Reconstructed historical factory in Žilina (Slovakia) for production of safety matches. Originally built in 1915 for the business firm Wittenberg and son.

=== Holistic planning and community-based participation ===
Industrial heritage conservation has increasingly embraced holistic planning strategies and community-based participation frameworks. According to Loures, involving local communities in the interpretation and management of industrial sites can enhance social identification with heritage and foster collective responsibility for its maintenance. Such approaches not only emphasise historical and cultural dimensions, but also consider the influence of ecological and socio-economic factors on the local quality of life.

Design principles that incorporate public participation may help ensure that urban renewal efforts reinforce local identity and promote community cohesion. Public awareness is important, as industrial sites are often perceived as complex, hazardous, or lacking clear cultural value, making it difficult to attract support from conventional heritage preservation groups. Educational initiatives, including guided tours and interpretive programs, can play a role in shifting public perceptions and enhancing appreciation of industrial landscapes.

Community engagement may also contribute to repositioning industrial heritage from being viewed as isolated relics to being recognized as an active part of everyday life shaped by surrounding communities. The Akerselva project in Oslo demonstrates how heritage-led urban renewal, when integrated into long-term holistic planning frameworks, can enhance both cultural significance and environmental quality. Alfrey and Putnam further argue that aligning conservation efforts with broader socio-economic policy frameworks contributes to more sustainable and relevant long-term outcomes in heritage management.

== Industrial heritage sites ==
=== Almadén Mercury Mining Site, Spain ===
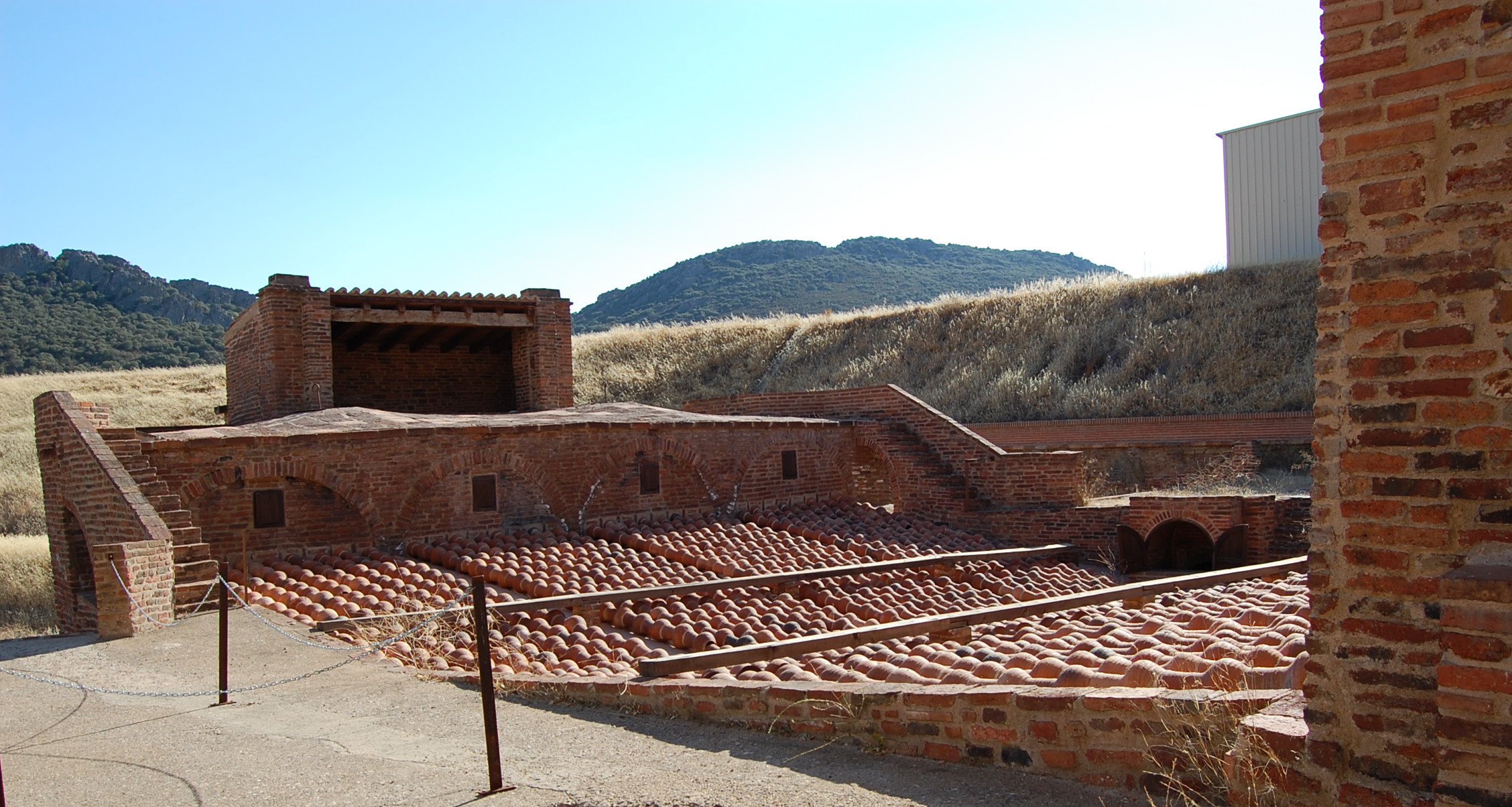
Almadén Mercury Mining Site, Spain

Located in southern Spain, Almadén is one of the oldest known mercury mining areas, with documented activity spanning over two millennia. Following the decline of mercury extraction in the late 20th century, the site was repurposed as the Almadén Mining Park, incorporating preserved underground galleries, surface installations, and interpretive facilities. In 2012, it was designated as part of the transnational UNESCO World Heritage Site "Heritage of Mercury: Almadén and Idrija", recognising its contribution to global mining history. The site is also listed as an Anchor Point on the European Route of Industrial Heritage (ERIH), reflecting its role in the development of industrial mining techniques and its transition to a heritage and educational resource.

Although regarded as one of Spain's key industrial tourism sites, Almadén receives a moderate visitor volume, with activities primarily focused on educational purposes. The site’s renovation has been supported by rural development programmes aimed at revitalising the local economy and preserving the cultural significance of its mercury mining heritage.

=== Engelsberg Ironworks, Sweden ===
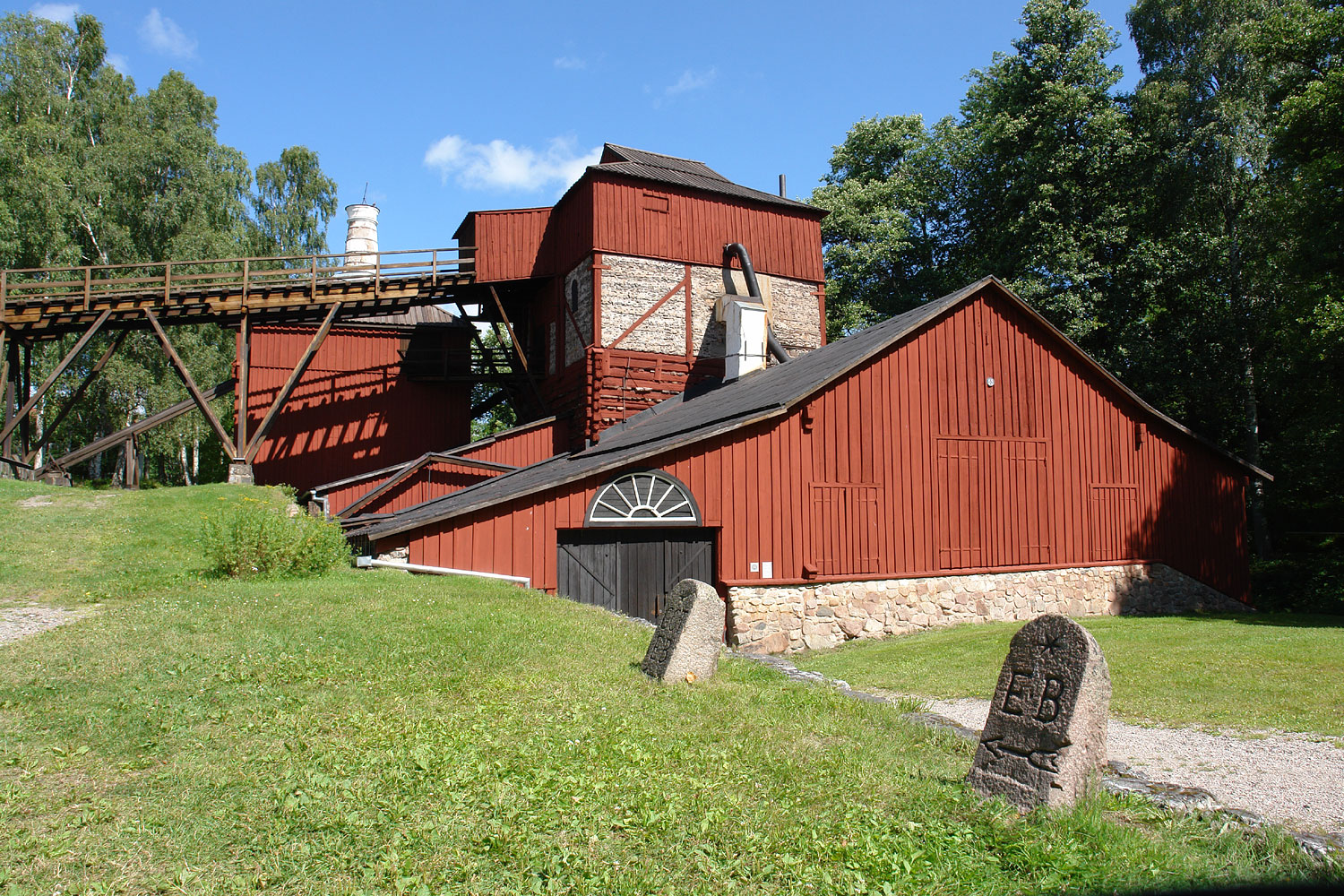
Engelsberg Ironworks, Sweden

Located in Norberg, central Sweden, Engelsberg Ironworks is a representative example of European industrial complexes from the 17th to 19th centuries. It is regarded as a well-preserved and structurally complete example of the ironworks in Sweden. The ironworks originated in the late 16th century, and the first blast furnace was built in 1681. The furnaces and supporting facilities built between 1778 and 1779 incorporated technological innovations of that time. The site covers an area of approximately 9.6 hectares and includes over 50 buildings of various ages and functions, including technical, administrative and residential facilities.

Engelsberg Ironworks was inscribed on the UNESCO World Heritage List in 1993 under Criterion (iv) as a notable example of European industrial heritage. Although production ceased in 1919, most of the buildings remain in their original state and the restoration process has met the standards of authenticity. This heritage site is protected under the Swedish Cultural Heritage Act and the federal Environmental Code, owned and maintained by the private company Nordstjernan AB, and jointly managed by local and national institutions.

== See also ==
- List of industrial archaeology topics
- List of notable industrial heritage sites
- Industrial archaeology

=== United Kingdom ===
- Anson Engine Museum
- Armley Mills Industrial Museum
- Blaenavon Industrial Landscape (Big Pit National Coal Museum and Blaenavon Ironworks)
- Bratch
- Industrial archaeology of Dartmoor
- Ironbridge Gorge Museum Trust
- Prestongrange Industrial Heritage Museum, East Lothian, Scotland
- Prickwillow Museum
- Rhondda Heritage Park
- Scottish Industrial Railway Centre
- Stretham Old Engine

=== Republic of Ireland ===
- Allihies Copper Mine Museum, County Cork
- Arigna Mining Experience, County Roscommon
- Bunnadober Mill, County Mayo
- Donegal Railway Heritage Centre, County Donegal
- Glengowla Mines, County Galway
- National Print Museum, Dublin
- Newbridge Silverware, County Kildare
- Steam Museum, Straffan, County Kildare

=== Europe ===
- European Route of Industrial Heritage
  - The Industrial Heritage Trail, Ruhr, Germany
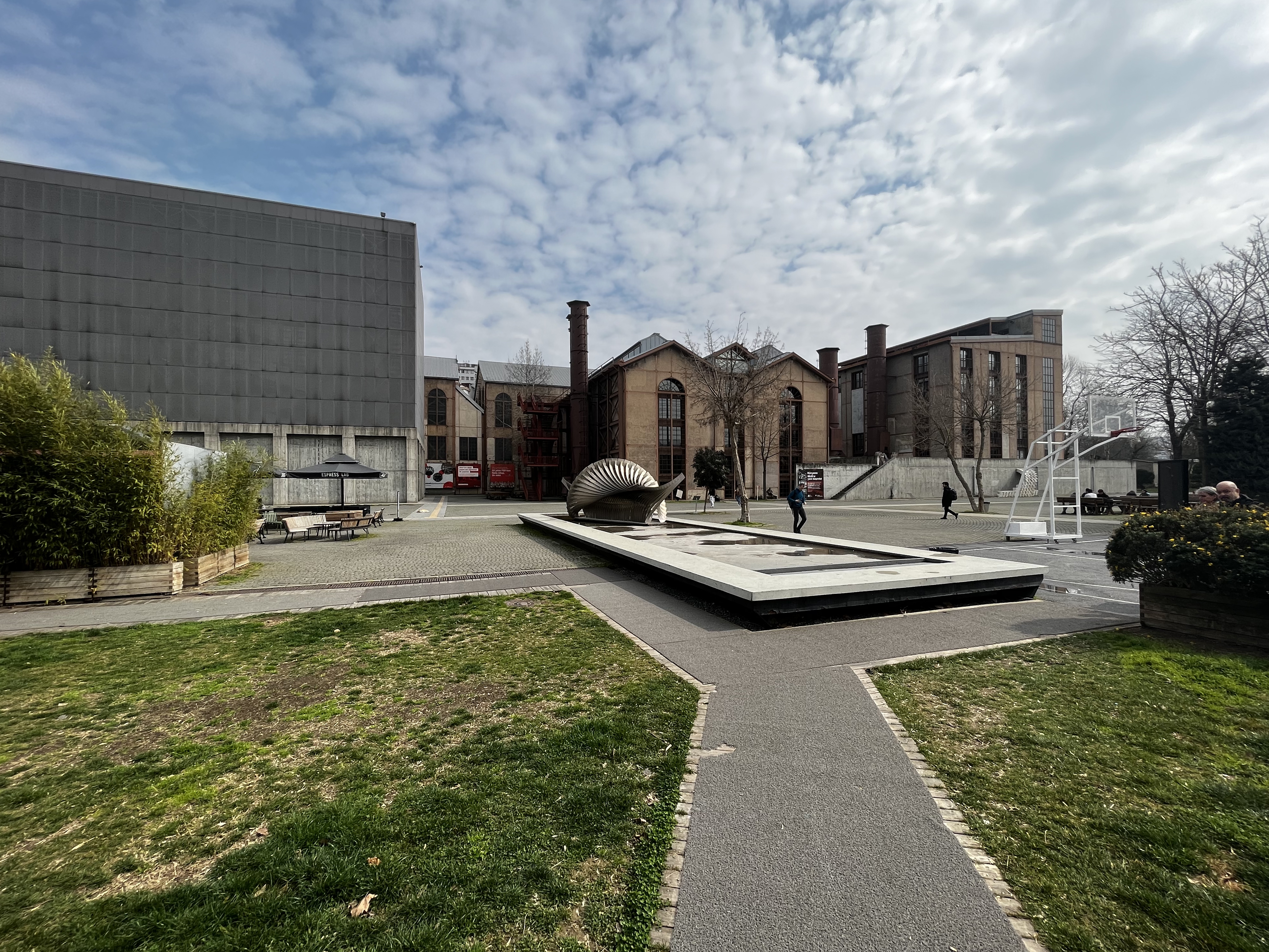
- SantralIstanbul
  Ore Mountain Mining Region, Germany/Czech Republic
- Pythagoras Mechanical Workshop Museum, Norrtälje, Sweden
- Vizcaya Bridge, Biscay, Spain

=== Turkey ===
- SantralIstanbul, İstanbul Bilgi University, Istanbul

=== Other regions ===
- Industrial heritage of Barbados
- Melbourne Steam Traction Engine Club, Australia
- Hagley Museum and Library, USA
- Sloss Furnaces, Birmingham, Alabama, USA
- Soulé Steam Feed Works, USA
- Asian Route of Industrial Heritage
- The Modern Industrial Heritage Sites in Kyushu and Yamaguchi, Japan
- The Tomioka Silk Mill and Related Industrial Heritage, Japan
