= List of industrial heritage sites =

This is a list of notable Industrial heritage sites throughout the world that have been inscribed on "top tier" heritage lists, including the UNESCO World Heritage List, Grade I listed buildings (England and Wales), Category A listed buildings (Scotland), Grade A listed buildings (Northern Ireland), National Historic Sites of Canada, National Historic Landmarks (USA), etc.

== UNESCO World Heritage Sites ==
Site Name	Image	Location	Country	Added	Notes
Blaenavon Industrial Landscape		Blaenavon	United Kingdom	2000	
Boat Lifts on the Canal du Centre		Hainaut	Belgium	1998	
City of Potosí		Potosí Department	Bolivia	1987	
Cornwall and West Devon Mining Landscape		Cornwall	United Kingdom	2006	
Crespi d'Adda		Capriate San Gervasio	Italy	1995	
Derwent Valley Mills		Derbyshire	United Kingdom	2001	
Engelsberg Ironworks		Ängelsberg	Sweden	1993	
Fagus Factory		Alfeld	Germany	2011	
Forth Bridge		Firth of Forth, Scotland	United Kingdom	2015	
Fray Bentos Cultural-Industrial Landscape		Río Negro Department	Uruguay	2015	
Great Copper Mountain		Falun	Sweden	2001	
Heritage of Mercury. Almadén and Idrija		Almadén and Idrija	Slovenia and Spain	2012	
Historic Centre of the Town of Diamantina		Diamantina, Minas Gerais	Brazil	1999	
Historic Silver Mine in Tarnowskie Góry		Tarnowskie Góry	Poland	2017	
Historic Town of Banská Štiavnica and the Technical Monuments in its Vicinity		Banská Štiavnica	Slovakia	1993	
Historic Town of Guanajuato and Adjacent Mines		Guanajuato City	Mexico	1988	
Historic Town of Ouro Preto		Ouro Preto	Brazil	1980	
Humberstone and Santa Laura Saltpeter Works		Tarapacá Region	Chile	2005	
Ir.D.F. Woudagemaal (D.F. Wouda Steam Pumping Station)		Lemsterland	Netherlands	1998	
Ironbridge Gorge		Shropshire	United Kingdom	1986	
Ivrea, Industrial City of the 20th Century		Ivrea	Italy	2018	
Iwami Ginzan Silver Mine		Ōda, Shimane	Japan	2007	
La Chaux-de-Fonds / Le Locle, Watchmaking Town Planning		Canton of Neuchâtel	Switzerland	2009	
Liverpool Maritime Mercantile City		Liverpool	United Kingdom	2004	In 2012, the site was inscribed on the List of World Heritage in Danger due to the proposed construction of Liverpool Waters project, and later its World heritage status was removed.
Major Mining Sites of Wallonia		Wallonia	Belgium	2012	Four sites: Grand Hornu, Bois-du-Luc, Bois du Cazier, Blegny-Mine
Mill Network at Kinderdijk-Elshout		South Holland	Netherlands	1997	
Mountain Railways of India		Darjeeling Himalayan Railway, Nilgiri Mountain Railway, Kalka–Shimla Railway	India	1999	
New Lanark		South Lanarkshire, Scotland	United Kingdom	2001	
Nord-Pas de Calais Mining Basin		Nord-Pas-de-Calais	France	2012	
Ombilin Coal Mine		Sawahlunto	Indonesia	2019	
Ore Mountain Mining Region		North Bohemia and Saxony	Czech Republic and Germany	2019	
Pontcysyllte Aqueduct		Wrexham County Borough, Wales	United Kingdom	2009	
Rhaetian Railway		Albula Railway and Bernina Railway	Italy and Switzerland	2008	
Rideau Canal		Ontario	Canada	2007	
Rjukan–Notodden Industrial Heritage Site		Telemark	Norway	2015	
Røros Mining Town and the Circumference		Trøndelag	Norway	1980	
Saltaire		West Yorkshire	United Kingdom	2001	
Sites of Japan's Meiji Industrial Revolution: Iron and Steel, Shipbuilding and Coal Mining		Fukuoka Prefecture, Iwate Prefecture, Kagoshima Prefecture, Kumamoto Prefecture, Nagasaki Prefecture, Saga Prefecture, Shizuoka Prefecture and Yamaguchi Prefecture	Japan	2015	Thirty component sites in eight areas
Semmering Railway		Semmering Pass	Austria	1998	
Sewell Mining Town		Machalí	Chile	2006	
Speicherstadt and Kontorhaus District with Chilehaus		Hamburg	Germany	2015	
Tomioka Silk Mill		Tomioka, Gunma	Japan	2014	
Upper Harz Water Regale		Upper Harz	Germany	1992	Affiliated with Mines of Rammelsberg
Van Nelle Factory		Rotterdam	Netherlands	2014	
Verla Groundwood and Board Mill		Kymenlaakso	Finland	1996	
Vizcaya Bridge		Biscay	Spain	2006	
Völklingen Ironworks		Saarland	Germany	1994	
Water Management System of Augsburg		Augsburg	Germany	2019	
Wieliczka Salt Mine		Wieliczka	Poland	1978	
Zollverein Coal Mine Industrial Complex		North Rhine-Westphalia	Germany	2001	

== Grade I listed industrial buildings and structures in England and Wales, Category A in Scotland, Grade A in Northern Ireland ==
Site Name	Image	Location	Country	Listed	Reference	Notes
1830 warehouse, Liverpool Road railway station		Manchester	England	1952	1282991	
Albert Dock, Warehouses A-E and Office		Liverpool	England	1952	1205175	
Abbeydale Industrial Hamlet		Sheffield	England	1952	1246418	Also known as Abbeydale Works Museum.
Broadford Works		Aberdeen	Scotland	1967	LB43908	The oldest iron-framed mill in Scotland, and the fourth oldest known to survive in the world, with 19th- and early-20th-century extensions.
Craigmore Viaduct		County Armagh	Northern Ireland			
Crofton Pumping Station		Great Bedwyn	England	1985	1034049	More information
Crossness Pumping Station		Crossness	England	1970	1064241	
Forth Bridge		Firth of Forth	Scotland	1973	LB40370	Nominated in May 2011 for addition to the UNESCO World Heritage Sites.
Forth Road Bridge		Firth of Forth	Scotland	2001	LB47778	
Galloway hydro-electric power scheme		Galloway	Scotland	1990	LB17126	
Glenfinnan Viaduct		Glenfinnan	Scotland	1971	LB310	
Grandholm Works		Aberdeen	Scotland	1991	LB18985	The largest vertically integrated tweed mill in Scotland.
House Mill		Bromley-by-Bow	England	1955	1080970	More information
Kincardine Bridge		Firth of Forth	Scotland	2005	LB50078	
Penallta Colliery		Hengoed	Wales			
Preston Mill		East Lothian	Scotland	1971	LB14531	18th century watermill and kiln, possibly incorporating earlier structure, with later additions.
Temple Works		Holbeck	England	1951	1375162	
Verdant Works		Dundee	Scotland	1987	LB25140	1833 flax mill with mid 19th century ancillary buildings.
Woodbridge Tide Mill		Woodbridge, Suffolk	England	1951	1300451	

== National Historic Sites of Canada ==
Site Name	Image	Location	Country	Designated	Notes
Atlas No. 3 Coal Mine National Historic Site		East Coulee, Alberta	Canada	2001	An exceptionally well-preserved coal-mining landscape spread across the side of a bluff.
Backhouse Grist Mill National Historic Site		Norfolk County, Ontario	Canada	1998	One of the oldest and best preserved examples of a small-scale, water-powered mill remaining in Canada.
Beauharnois Hydroelectric Power Station		Beauharnois, Quebec	Canada	1990	Considered the most powerful generating station in Canada when completed in 1961. It is still one of the largest run-of-river plants in the world.
Chambly Canal National Historic Site		Chambly, Quebec	Canada	1929	The canal constitutes part of an inland water transportation route joining Montréal and New York City. The site includes the waterway itself, nine locks, five weirs, two piers, dams, dikes and bridges, and several other elements and buildings associated with the operation of the canal.
Cobalt Mining District National Historic Site		Cobalt, Ontario	Canada	2002	A rare cultural landscape consisting of vestiges and buildings associated with the evolution of hard rock mining in Canada.
Esterhazy Flour Mill		Esterhazy, Saskatchewan	Canada	2009	A rare and complete illustration of a period of flour milling technology that was crucial to the grain industry.
La Fabrique National Historic Site		Quebec City, Quebec	Canada	2011	Former Dominion Corset Manufacturing Building.
First Commercial Oil Field National Historic Site		Oil Springs, Ontario	Canada	1925	The site contains the first commercial oil well in the world, the first drilled well in Canada, the first gumbeds that were commercially used in the world, and the first gas gusher in Canada.
Forges du Saint-Maurice		Trois-Rivières, Quebec	Canada	1920	Established in 1730, Forges du Saint-Maurice was the principal industry under the French Regime. From 1973, the site has been the subject of an extensive research and interpretation program conducted by Parks Canada Agency.
Gulf of Georgia Cannery		Richmond, British Columbia	Canada	1976	Operated until 1979.
Inglis Grain Elevators National Historic Site		Inglis, Manitoba	Canada	1995	Erected between 1922 and 1941. A rare surviving icon of prairie towns during the “golden age of grain.”
Lachine Canal National Historic Site		Island of Montreal, Quebec	Canada	1929	An early 19th-century canal, 14 kilometres in length, built to circumvent five kilometres of white water on the St. Lawrence River between Lachine and the old port on Montréal Island.
Lachine Canal Manufacturing Complex National Historic Site		Island of Montreal, Quebec	Canada	1997	Former Redpath Sugar Refinery Property.
McLean Mill National Historic Site		Vancouver Island, British Columbia	Canada	1989	Former sawmill and logging operation established in 1925 by Robert Bartlett McLean.
Québec Bridge National Historic Site		Quebec City, Quebec	Canada	1995	The longest clear-span cantilever bridge in the world.
Queenston-Chippawa Hydro-Electric Development National Historic Site		Niagara Falls, Ontario	Canada	1990	Built between 1917 and 1925, it was the first large hydro-electric project in the world. Renamed after Adam Beck in 1950.
Shawinigan Aluminum Smelting Complex		Shawinigan, Quebec	Canada	2002	An early aluminum smelter and hydroelectric plants that supplied it with power. The oldest known, extant aluminum smelting complex in North America.
Springhill Coal Mining National Historic Site		Springhill, Nova Scotia	Canada	1997	One of Canada's most commercially important coalfields. Surviving in situ surface and underground mining features are collectively more complete than any other in the province.
Toronto Power Generating Station		Niagara Falls, Ontario	Canada	1983	The first wholly Canadian-owned hydro-electric facility at Niagara Falls. The powerhouse is an early and unusual application of Beaux-Arts design to an industrial site in Canada.

== National Historic Sites and National Historical Parks (USA) ==
Note: most sites listed below are also National Historic Landmarks.

Site Name	Image	Location	Country	Established	Notes
Allegheny Portage Railroad National Historic Site		Blair County and Cambria County, Pennsylvania	United States	1964	The Allegheny Portage Railroad was 36 miles in length connecting the Hollidaysburg Canal Basin with the basin at Johnstown.
Boston Naval Shipyard		Boston, Massachusetts	United States	1974	Part of Boston National Historical Park. Site played an important role in building, and maintaining, the United States Navy fleet.
Hopewell Furnace National Historic Site		Berks County, Pennsylvania	United States	1938	Park showcases an early American industrial landscape from natural resource extraction to enlightened conservation.
Lowell National Historical Park		Lowell, Massachusetts	United States	1978	Park tells the story of Lowell's role in the Industrial Revolution and America in the 19th-20th century.
Paterson Great Falls National Historical Park		Paterson, New Jersey	United States	2011	Great Falls was harnessed to power new industries and played a key role in shaping the American Industrial Revolution and building the U.S. economy.
Saugus Iron Works National Historic Site		Saugus, Massachusetts	United States	1968	A reconstructed early integrated iron works, including a blast furnace, forge, rolling mill, shear, slitter and a quarter-ton drop hammer.
Springfield Armory National Historic Site		Springfield, Massachusetts	United States	1978	NHS includes the original 1840s arsenal houses the world's largest collection of historic American military firearms.
Staple Bend Tunnel		Johnstown, Pennsylvania	United States	2001	Operated as a separate area of Allegheny Portage Railroad National Historic Site since 2001.
Steamtown National Historic Site		Scranton, Pennsylvania	United States	1986	Steamtown NHS occupies about 40 acres of the Scranton railroad yard of the former Delaware, Lackawanna and Western Railroad.

== National Historic Landmarks (USA) ==
Site Name	Image	Location	Country	Added	Notes
Bingham Canyon Mine		Salt Lake County, Utah	United States	1966	
Boston Manufacturing Company		Waltham, Massachusetts	United States	1977	
Carrie Blast Furnaces 6 and 7		Rankin, Pennsylvania	United States	2006	
Clark Thread Company Historic District		East Newark, New Jersey	United States	1978	
Ford River Rouge Complex		Dearborn, Michigan	United States	1978	
Harmony Mills		Cohoes, New York	United States	1999	
Harrisville Historic District		Harrisville, New Hampshire	United States	1977	
Highland Park Ford Plant		Highland Park, Michigan	United States	1978	
Hull–Rust–Mahoning Open Pit Iron Mine		Hibbing, Minnesota	United States	1966	
Lowell Locks and Canals Historic District		Lowell, Massachusetts	United States	1977	
Mountain Iron Mine		Mountain Iron, Minnesota	United States	1968	
Peavey–Haglin Experimental Concrete Grain Elevator		St. Louis Park, Minnesota	United States	1981	
Phoenix Shot Tower		Baltimore, Maryland	United States	1971	
Pillsbury A-Mill		Minneapolis, Minnesota	United States	1966	
Quincy Mining Company Historic District		Houghton County, Michigan	United States	1989	
St. Croix Boom Site		Stillwater, Minnesota	United States	1966	
Slater Mill Historic Site		Pawtucket, Rhode Island	United States	1966	
Sloss Furnaces		Birmingham, Alabama	United States	1981	
Soudan Iron Mine		Tower, Minnesota	United States	1966	
Speedwell Ironworks		Morris County, New Jersey	United States	1974	
Spindletop		Beaumont, Texas	United States	1966	
Washburn A Mill Complex		Minneapolis, Minnesota	United States	1983	
Watervliet Arsenal		Watervliet, New York	United States	1966	

== See also ==
- Industrial archaeology
- List of industrial archaeology topics
- History of science and technology
