= Fagersta Municipality =

Fagersta Municipality Fagersta kommun
- Municipality
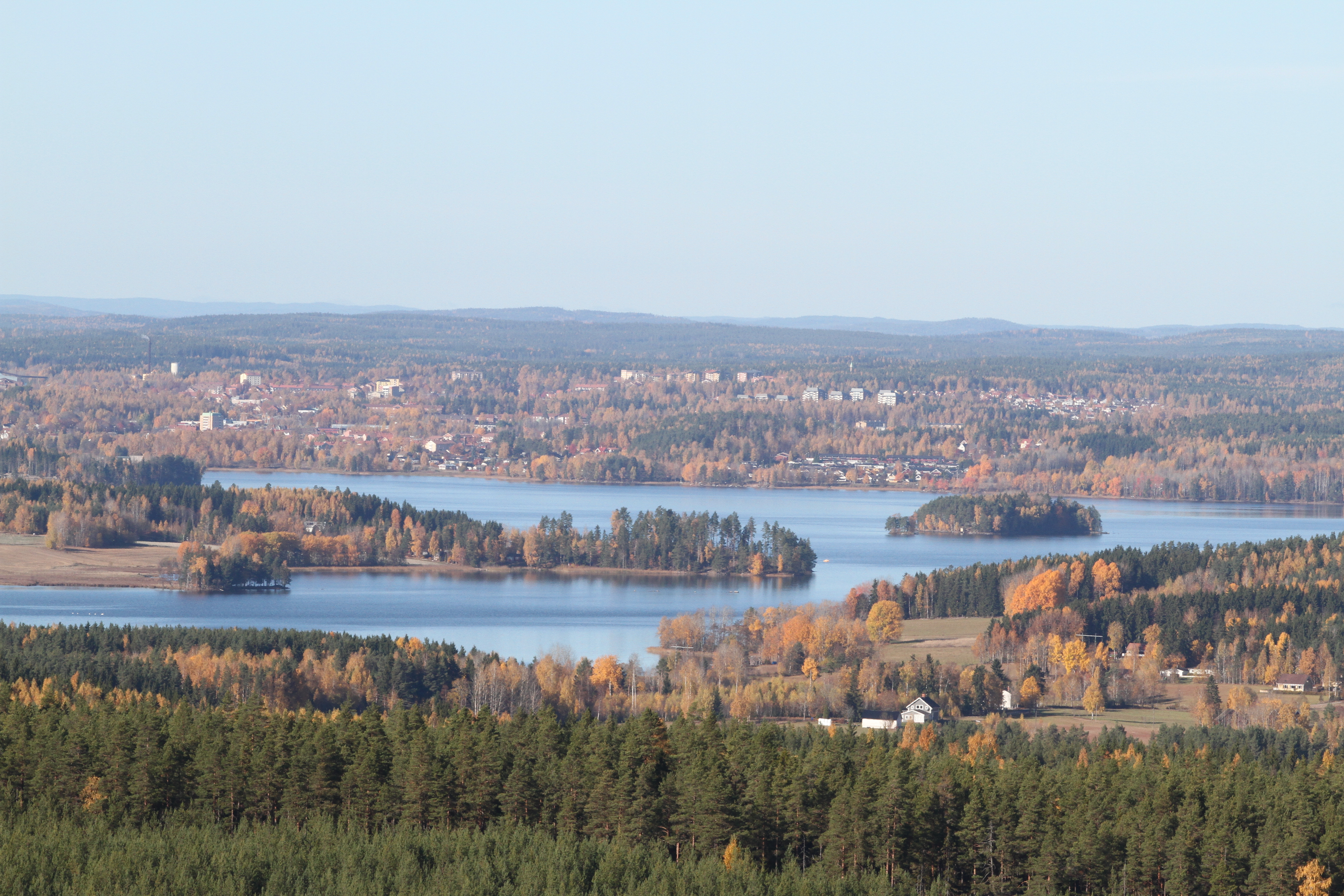

- Coat of arms

- Coordinates: 60°00′N 15°49′E
- Country: Sweden
- County: Västmanland County
- Seat: Fagersta

Area
  - Total: 310.41 km^{2} (119.85 sq mi)
  - Land: 269.04 km^{2} (103.88 sq mi)
  - Water: 41.37 km^{2} (15.97 sq mi)
- Area as of 1 January 2014.

Population (30 June 2025)
  - Total: 13,055
  - Density: 48.524/km^{2} (125.68/sq mi)
- Time zone: UTC+1 (CET)
  - Summer (DST): UTC+2 (CEST)
- ISO 3166 code: SE
- Province: Västmanland
- Municipal code: 1982
- Website: www.fagersta.se

Fagersta Municipality (Swedish: Fagersta kommun) is a municipality in Västmanland County in central Sweden. Its seat is located in the city of Fagersta.

The City of Fagersta (instituted in 1944) was in 1967 merged with Västervåla parish (which had been part of Surahammar Municipality since 1963). In 1971 it was transformed into a municipality of unitary type.

== Localities ==
The municipal seat, Fagersta, is the only locality within the municipality with more than 200 inhabitants.

Another locality of note is Ängelsberg, a village located on Åmänningen Lake.

== Politics of Fagersta ==
Fagersta is historically a left wing stronghold, with mostly a social democratic majority running the town, a trend only broken with a further left majority between 1998 and 2014. However, a rapid shift saw the right-leaning coalition narrowly win the 2022 Swedish general election vote in the municipality. The local elections still saw the Social Democratic-Left Party combination winning a combined majority of seats.

== Demographics ==
This is a demographic table based on Fagersta Municipality's electoral districts in the 2022 Swedish general election sourced from SVT's election platform, in turn taken from SCB official statistics.

In total there were 13,284 residents, including 9,607 Swedish citizens of voting age. 49.0% voted for the left coalition and 49.9% for the right coalition. Indicators are in percentage points except population totals and income.

Location	Residents	Citizen adults	Left vote	Right vote	Employed	Swedish parents	Foreign heritage	Income SEK	Degree
Location			%	%					
Centrum	2,407	1,703	53.1	45.1	68	54	46	20,246	25
Kolarbyn	2,079	1,234	61.7	37.4	56	37	63	17,905	18
Meling	1,806	1,304	48.4	50.4	87	81	19	29,805	35
Per Ols	2,209	1,626	45.5	54.2	85	73	27	28,913	28
Risbron	2,153	1,580	49.8	49.1	72	57	43	22,908	24
Västanfors	1,329	1,064	44.8	54.5	83	77	23	25,388	31
Åvestbo-Västervåla	1,301	1,096	39.9	58.4	84	85	15	28,290	27
Source: SVT

== Sights ==
Engelsberg Ironworks, in Ängelsberg, is a UNESCO World Heritage Site.

== Notable people ==
- Anitra Steen, manager of Systembolaget, former civil servant
- Lennart Hellsing, writer
- Ulf Samuelsson, ice hockey player
- Tomas Sandström, ice hockey player
- The Hives, rock band

== Sister Cities ==
- Budakeszi, Hungary
- Haapavesi, Finland
- Pehčevo, North Macedonia
