= Asian Route of Industrial Heritage =

The Asian Route of Industrial Heritage (ARIH) is a network (theme route) which has the purpose to link the most important industrial heritage sites in South-east Asia. The creation of this themed route is based upon the well established example of the European Route of Industrial Heritage.

== History ==
This initiative started with the “Taipei Declaration for Asian Industrial Heritage” made in November 2012, at the 15th TICCIH Congress in Taipei. The project is co-organised by various associations for industrial heritage conservation in Asia. And, in September 2014, experts and scholars from TICCIH (International Committee for the Conservation of the Industrial Heritage), ERIH, and the Asian Region signed a Memorandum of Understanding to initiate its establishment.

== Anchor Points ==
The route consists of Anchor Points, filled in by historical or tourist important Industrial Heritage Sites. Those so called Anchor Points are now (2016) found in Taiwan, Japan, Malaysia, India, and China.
