= Bunnadober Mill =

- Muileann Bhun na dTobar
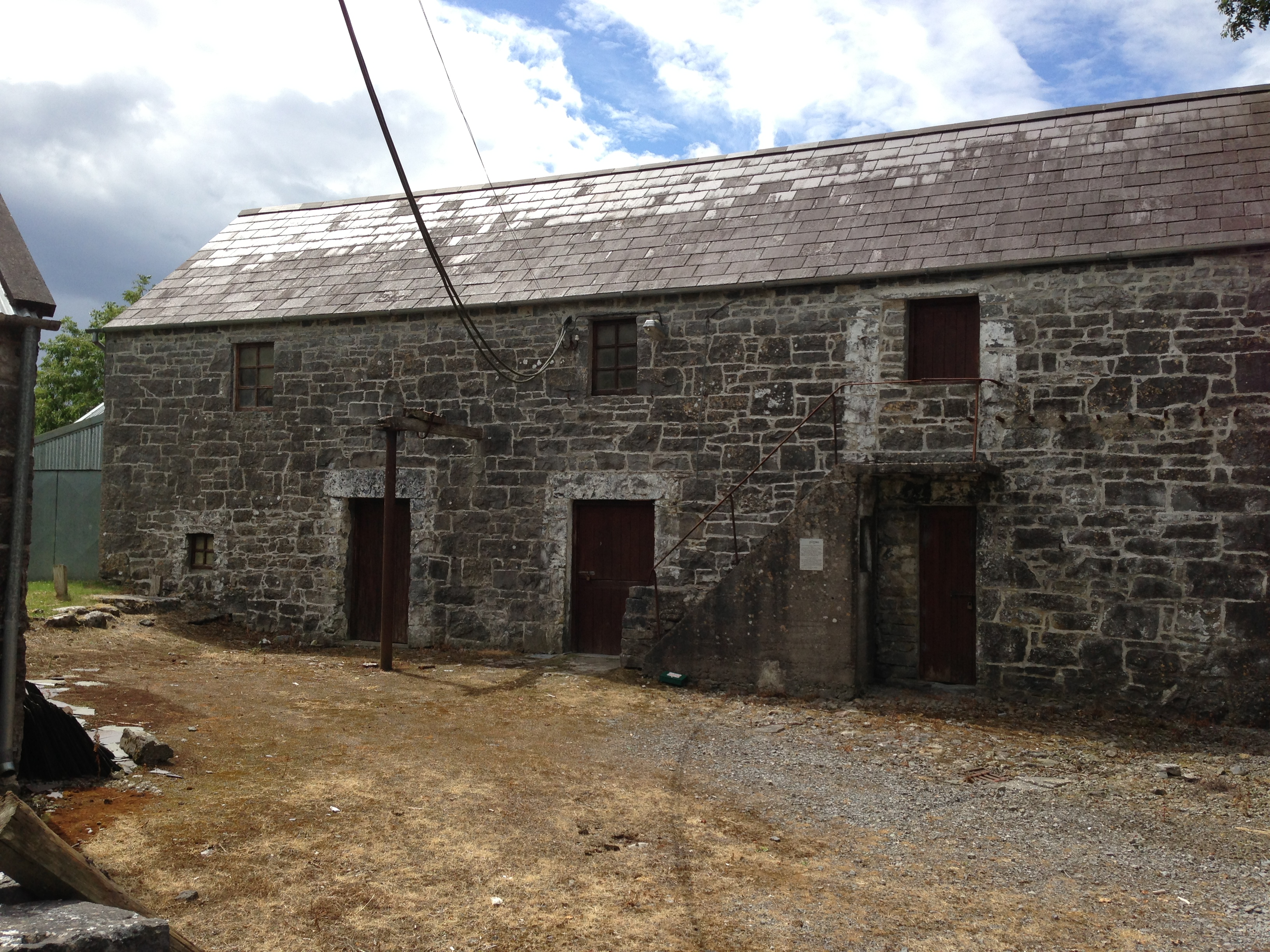

- Location within Ireland
- Alternative names: Moran's Mill

General information
- Status: Heritage building
- Type: Watermill
- Architectural style: Vernacular
- Location: Rahard, Ballinrobe, Ireland
- Coordinates: 53.607564°N 9.267801°W
- Elevation: 21 m (69 ft)
- Completed: before 1838
- Closed: 1980

Technical details
- Material: slate, clay tiles, limestone, cast iron
- Floor count: 1½

Design and construction
- Designations

National monument of Ireland
- Official name: Bunnadober Mill Complex
- Reference no.: 664

Renovating team
- Renovating firm: Howley Hayes

Bunnadober Mill is a watermill and National Monument located in County Mayo, Ireland.

== Location ==
Bunnadober Mill is located at a crossing point of the Bunnadober River, 3.5 km (2.2 mi) southwest of Ballinrobe.

== History ==
The present mill was open by 1838 and was owned by William Walsh, before passing to the Morans c. 1900. A corn-drying kiln was later added.

The mill closed in 1980 was acquired by the state from the Moran family in 1996. It contains a unique example of a horizontal water wheel in Ireland, and has been described as "a testament to ingenuity and thrift far from an industrial centre." and "a unique and very important example of industrial archaeology."

== Description ==
The mill is a three-bay single-storey rectangular building with half-attic and was powered by the Bunnadober river, which has its source as an underground outflow of the Bulkaun River.

Along with the buildings and mill machinery, there is a large collection of artefacts associated with the mill.
