= Ängelsberg =

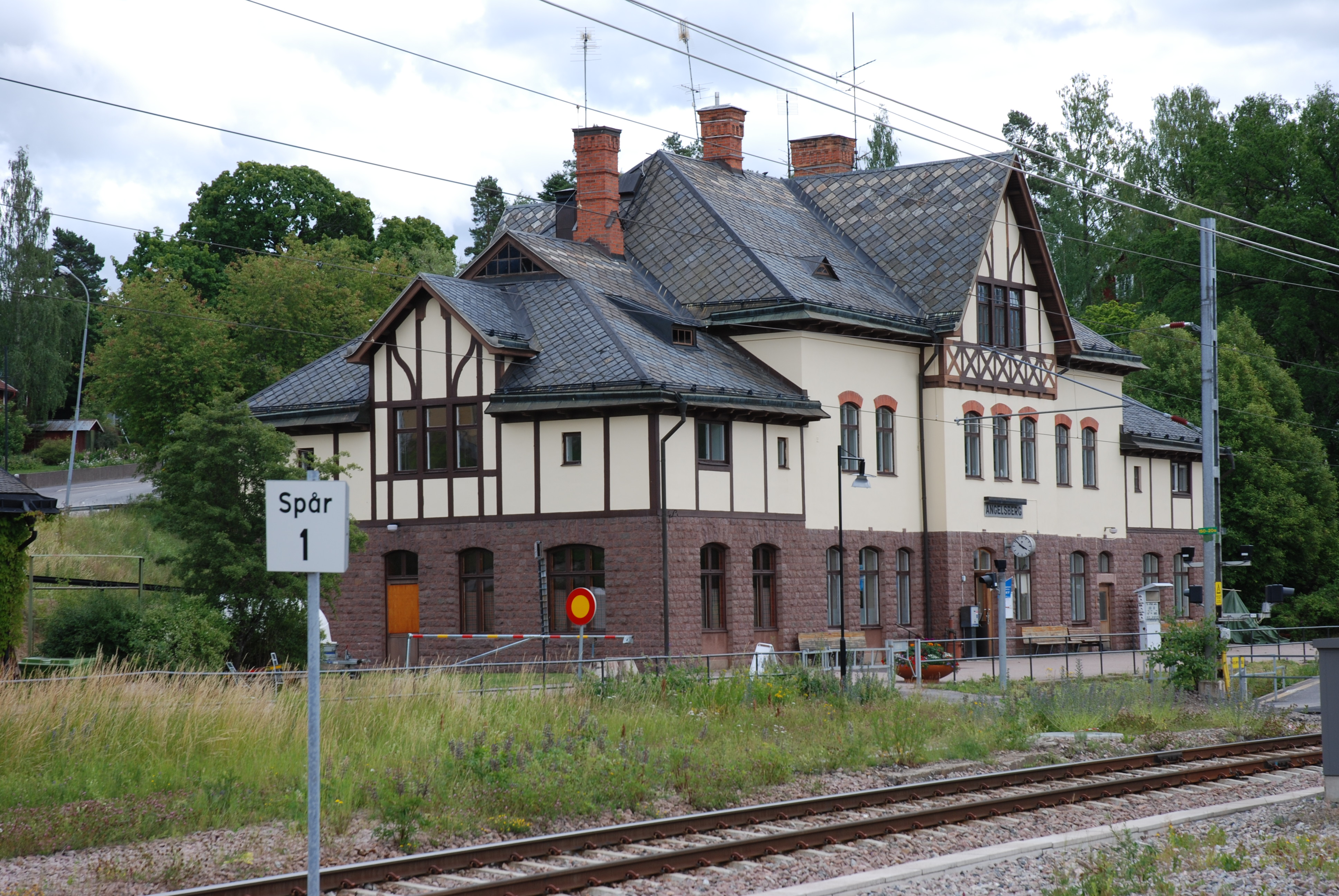
- Ängelsberg railway station, architect Erik Lallerstedt, 1900. Photo: Bengt Oberger

- Location within Västmanland Location within Sweden
- Coordinates: 59°57′N 16°00′E
- Country: Sweden
- Province: Västmanland
- County: Västmanland County
- Municipality: Fagersta Municipality

Area
  - Total: 0.86 km^{2} (0.33 sq mi)

Population (31 December 2005)
  - Total: 144
  - Density: 167/km^{2} (430/sq mi)
- Time zone: UTC+1 (CET)
  - Summer (DST): UTC+2 (CEST)

Ängelsberg is a village situated in Fagersta Municipality, Västmanland County, Sweden with 144 inhabitants in 2005. It is famous for the Engelsberg Ironworks and the oldest preserved oil refinery in the world, Engelsberg Refinery.
