= Engelsberg Ironworks =

UNESCO World Heritage Site
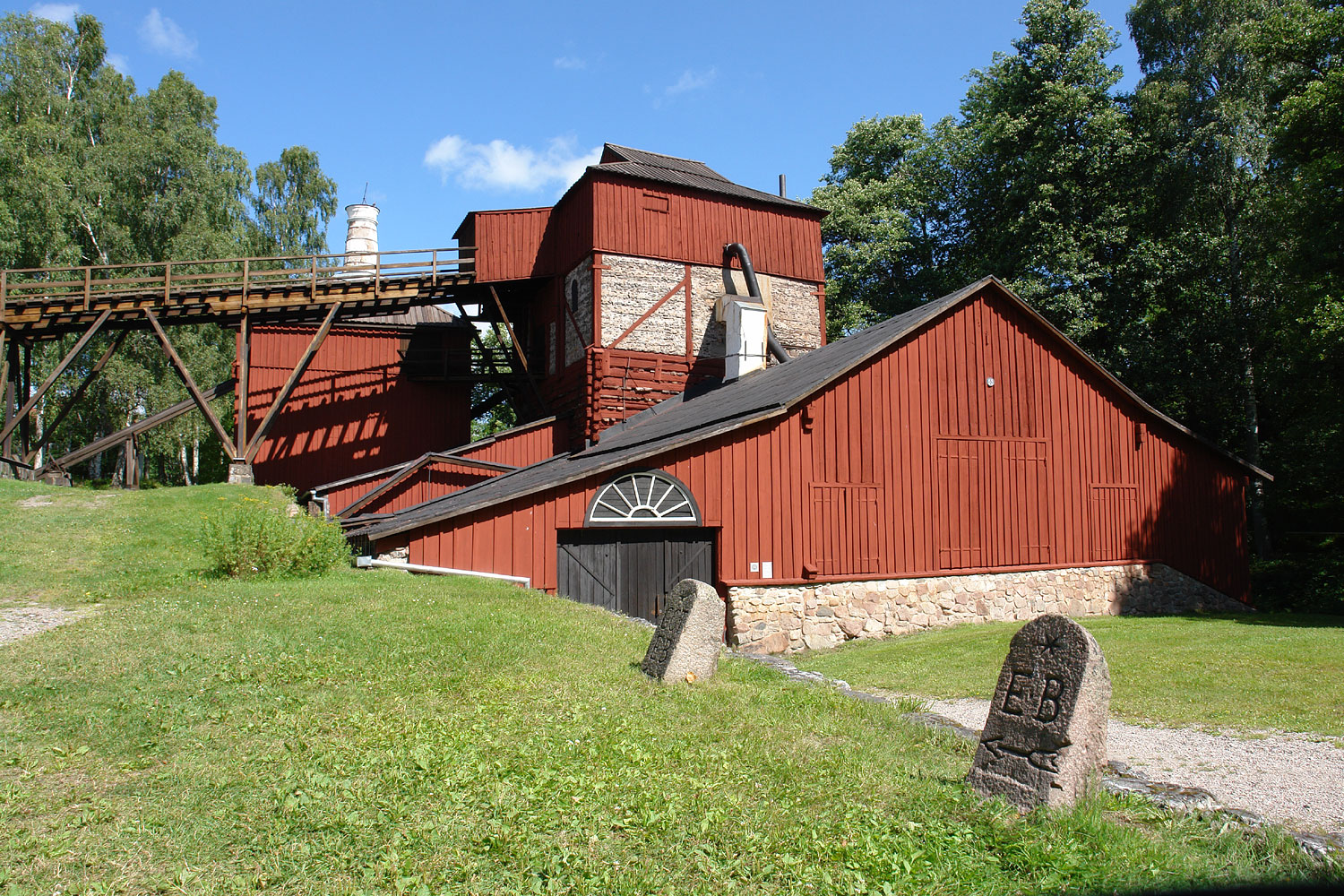

- Location within Sweden
- Location: Ängelsberg, Fagersta Municipality, Sweden
- Criteria: Cultural: (iv)
- Reference: 556rev
- Inscription: 1993 (17th Session)
- Area: 9.596 ha (23.71 acres)
- Coordinates: 59°58′00″N 16°00′30″E

Engelsberg Ironworks (Swedish: Engelsbergs bruk) is an ironworks in Ängelsberg, a village in Fagersta Municipality in Västmanland County, Sweden. It was built in 1681 by Per Larsson Gyllenhöök (1645–1706) and developed into one of the world's most modern ironworks in the period 1700–1800. It is listed as a UNESCO World Heritage Site since 1993.

== Name ==
Engelsberg Ironworks is named after Englika. Englika, who was born in Germany, began producing iron in Engelsberg in the 14th century.

== History ==
The history of iron production in the region dates back to at least 13th century. The local peasants both mined the ore and produced the iron using primitive furnaces.

In the end of the 16th century more modern production methods were introduced in Engelsberg and production volumes increased substantially in the following decades.

The mill, which historically belonged to the Västervåla parish and Norberg, was built in 1681 by the county sheriff Per Larsson Höök (1645–1706). By then, ironworking had already been carried out on the site for a long time by miners.

== Description ==
The preserved buildings include a manor house, the inspector's house and the smelting house with a blast furnace.

== UNESCO World Heritage Site ==
Engelsberg Ironworks is a UNESCO World Heritage Site. It was added to the list in 1993. The UNESCO comments were:

Sweden's production of superior grades of iron made it a leader in this field in the 17th and 18th centuries. This site is the best-preserved and most complete example of this type of Swedish ironworks.

== Gallery ==
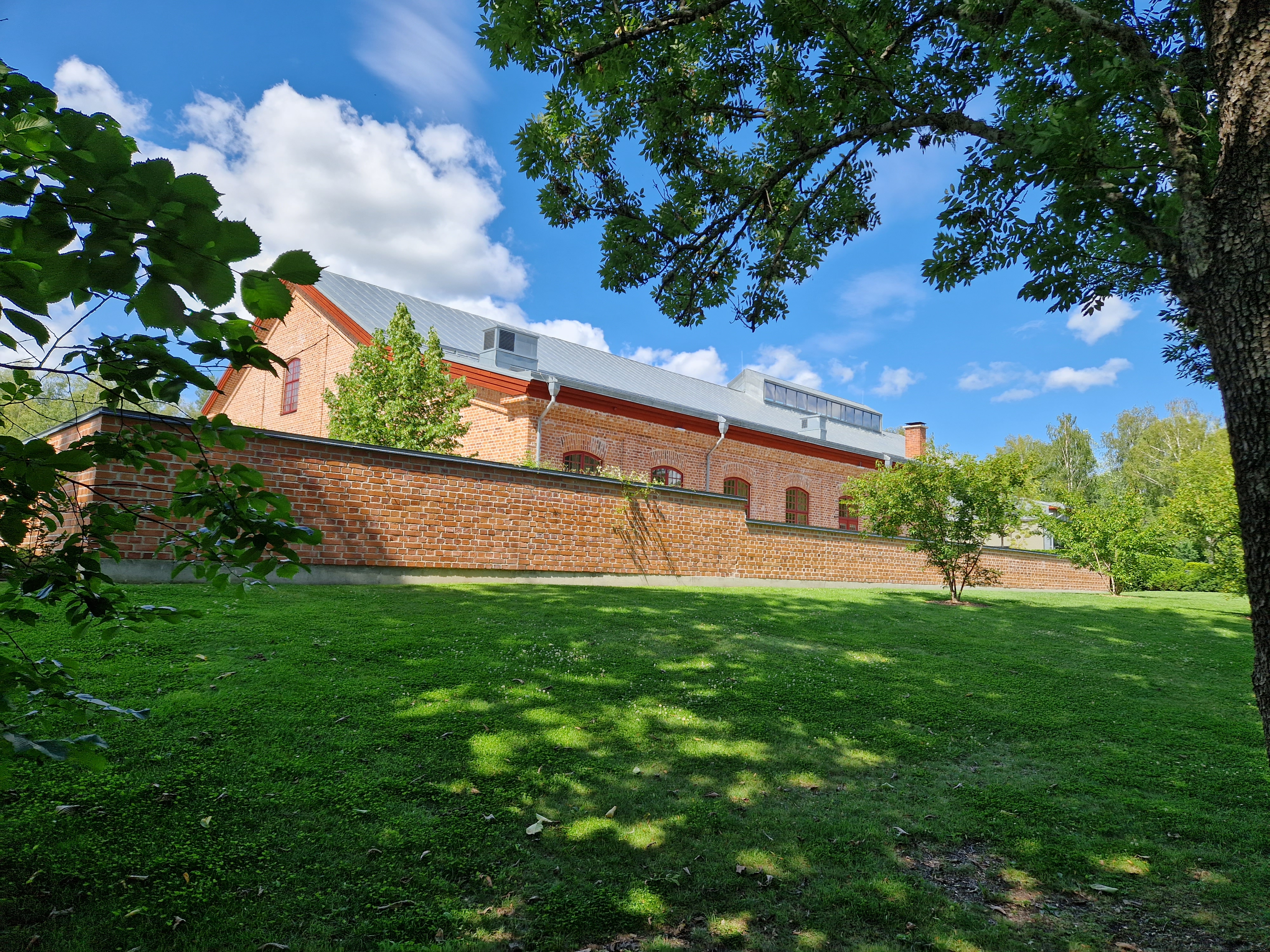
Conference center

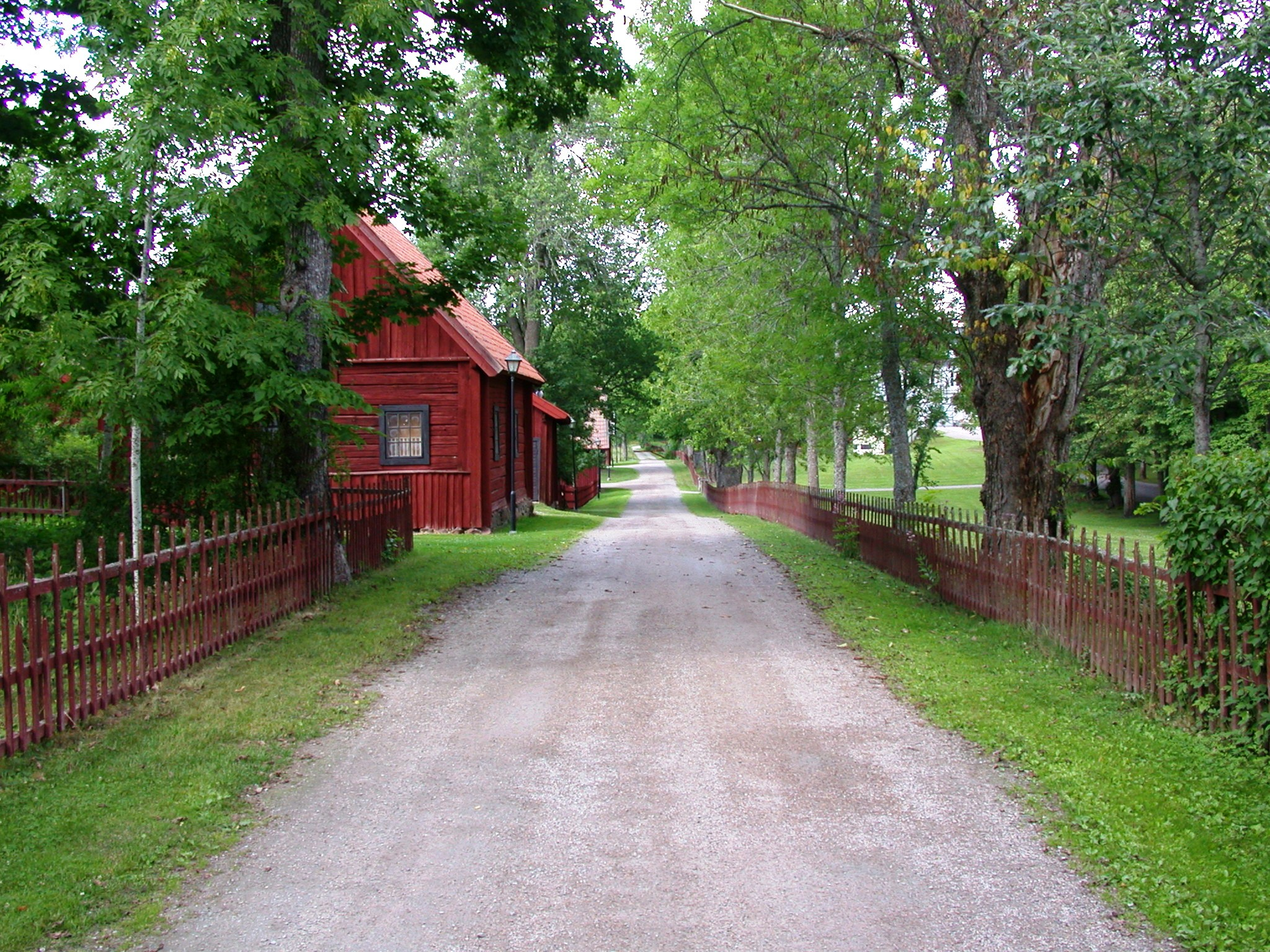
A road at Engelsberg iron works

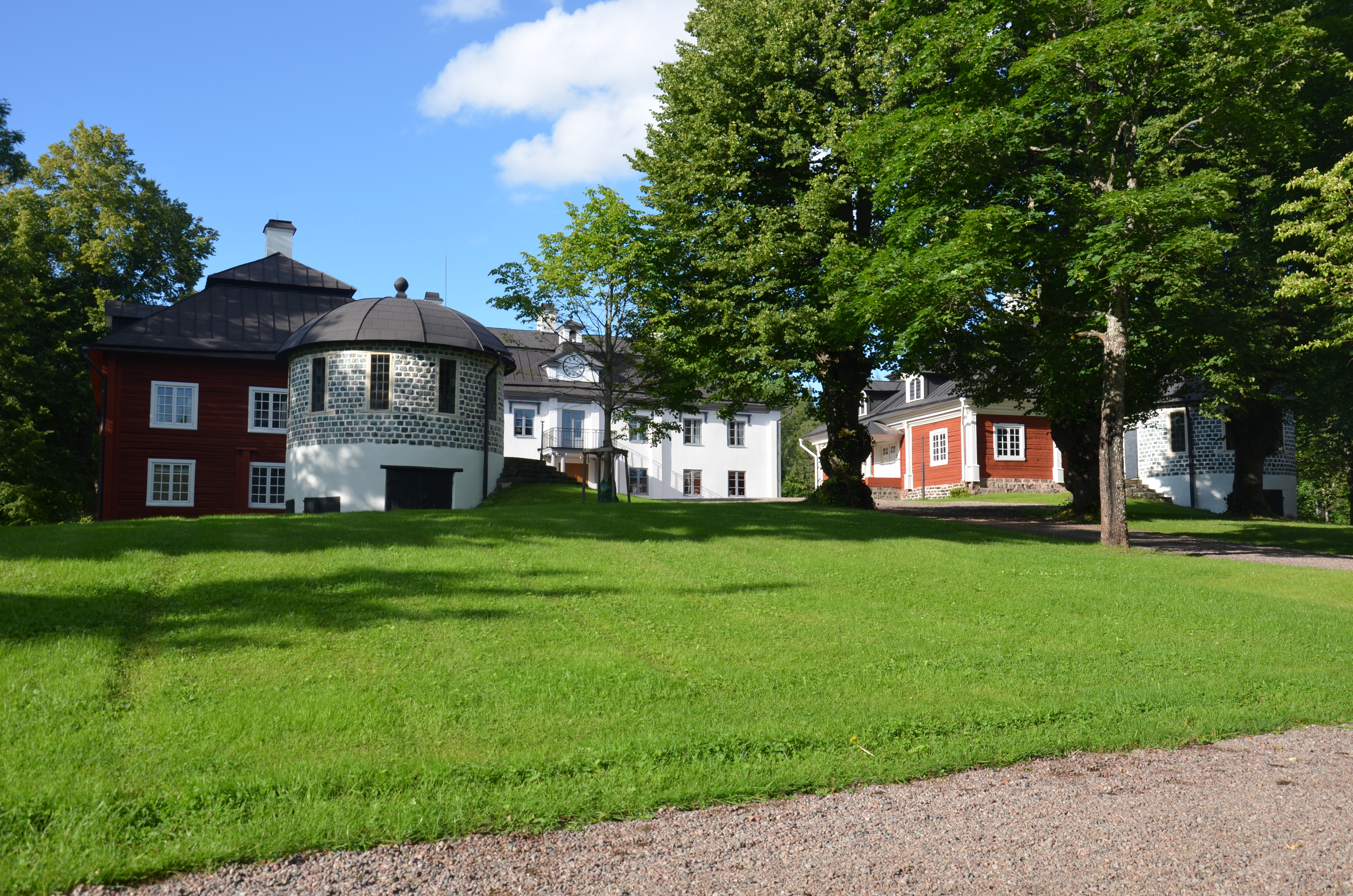
The mansion with wings

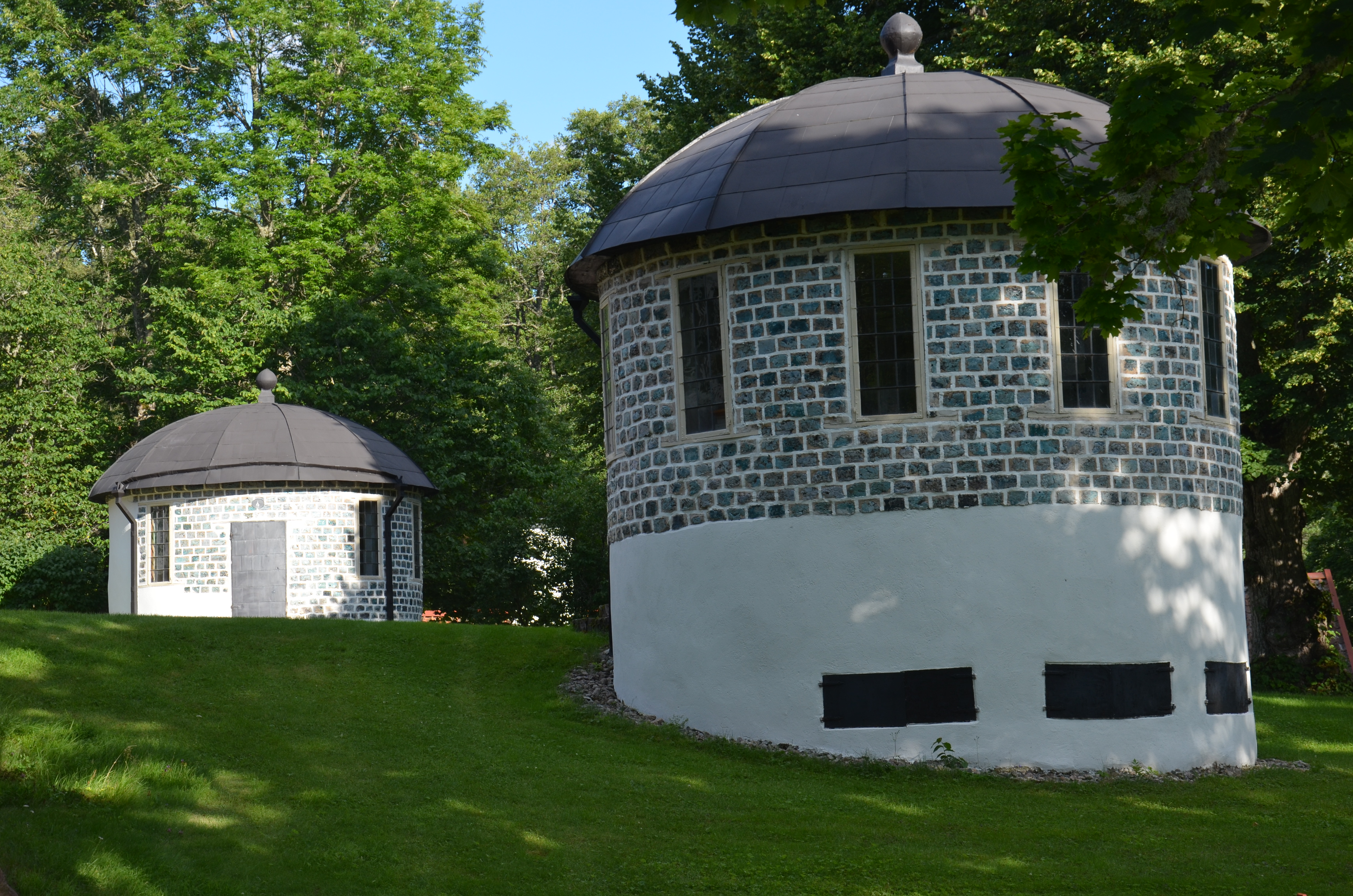
The two slag stone towers

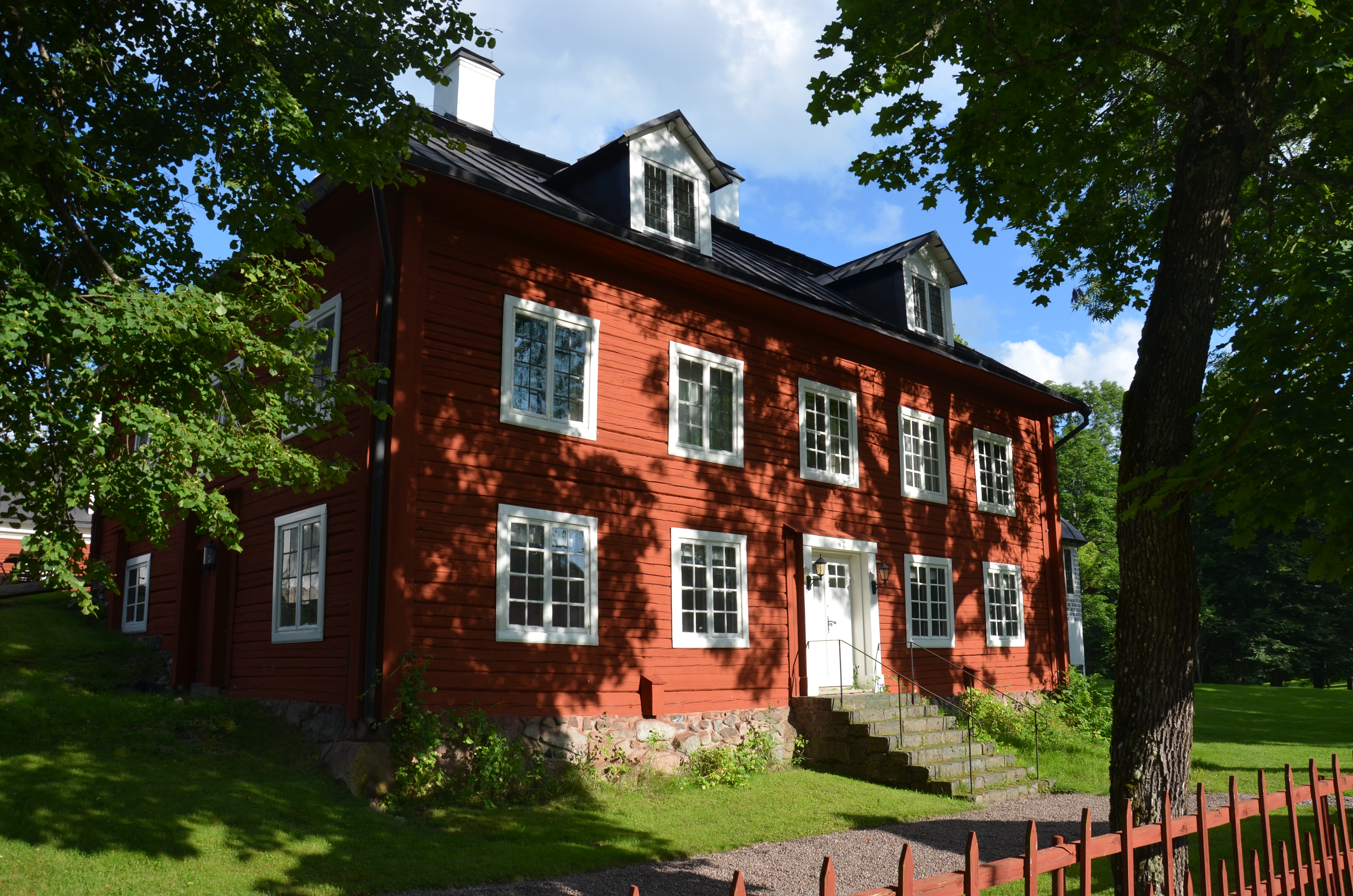
The west wing

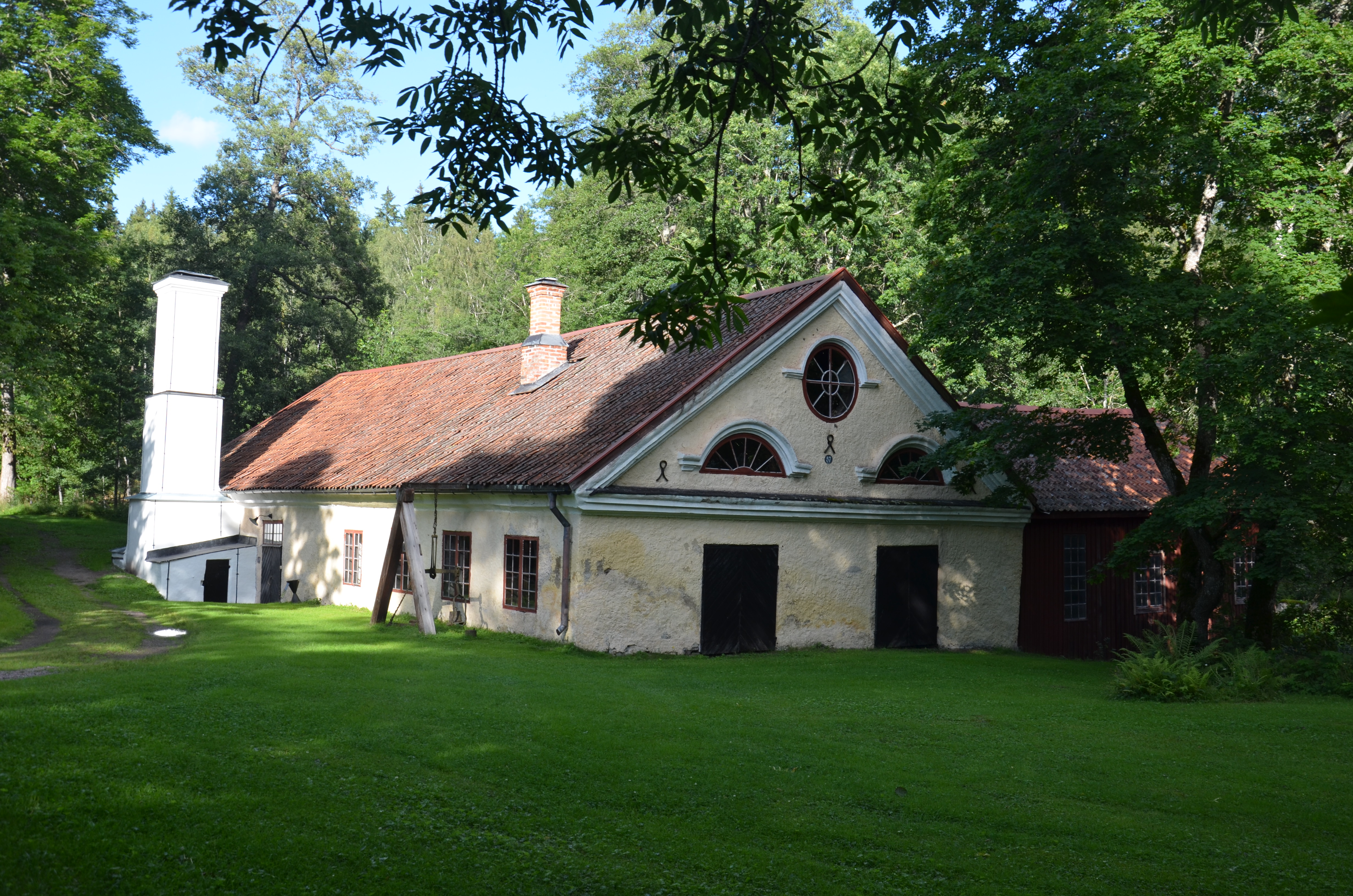
The forge

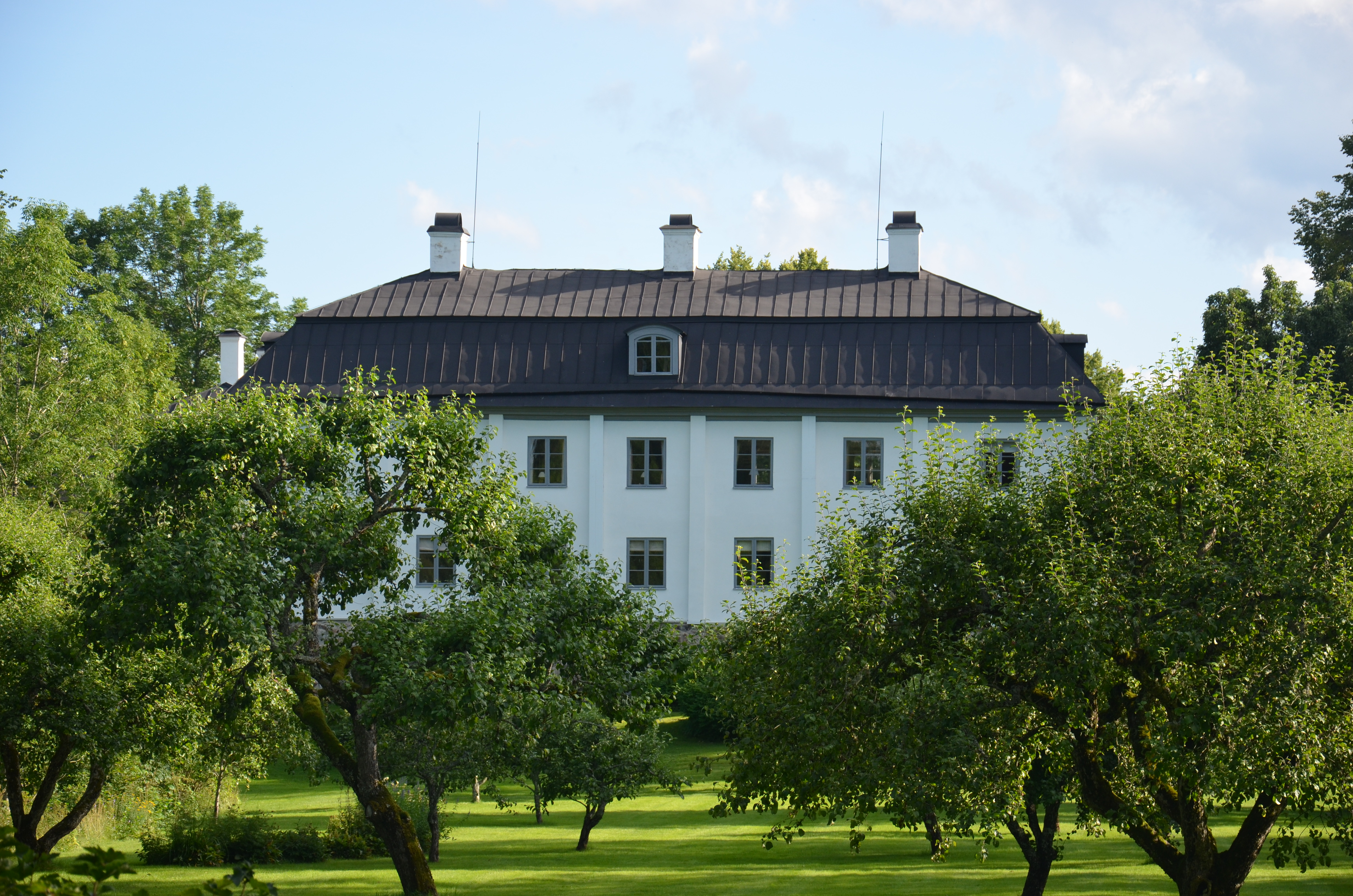
The mansion from the garden side

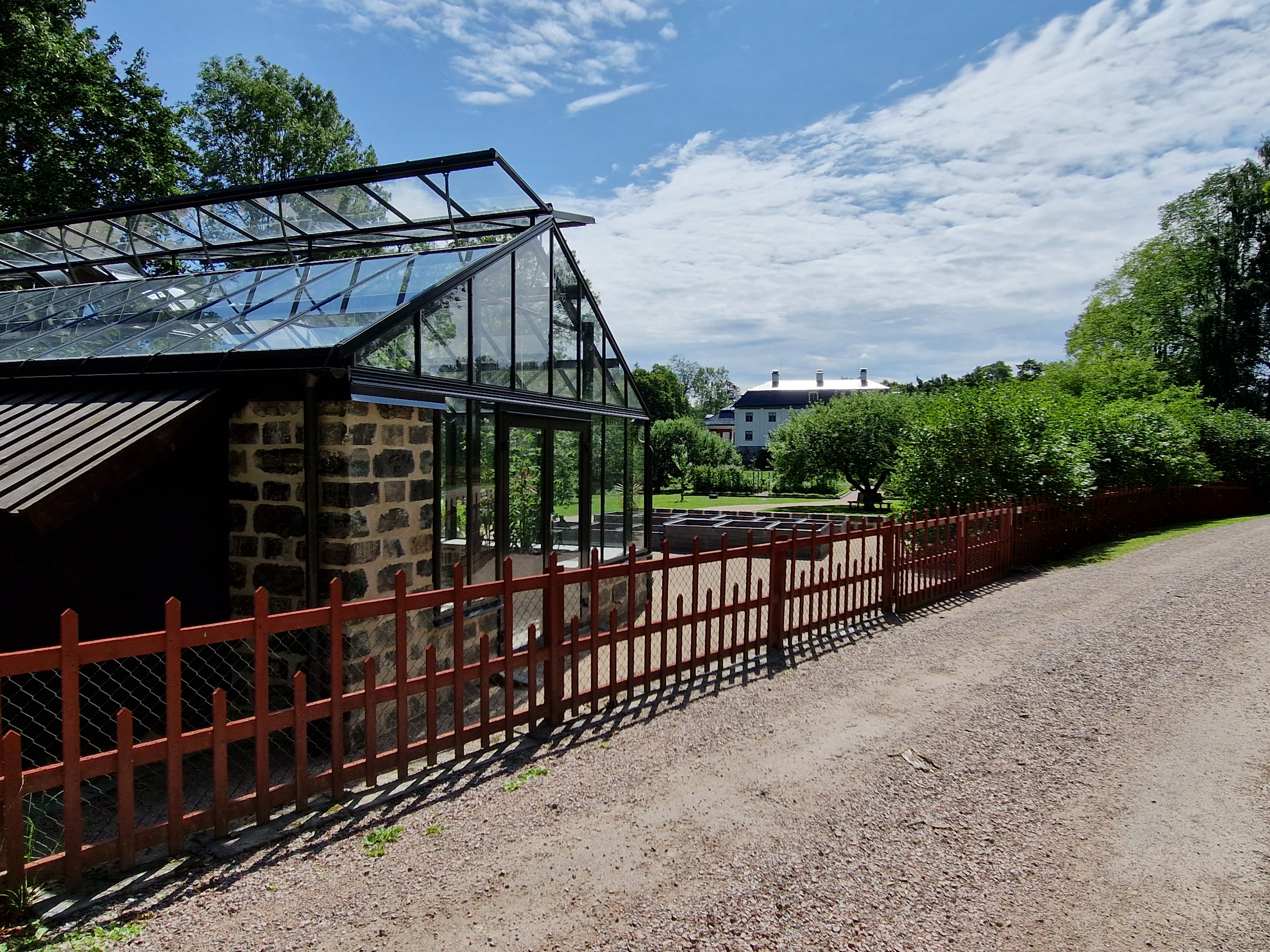
Kitchen and pleasure garden

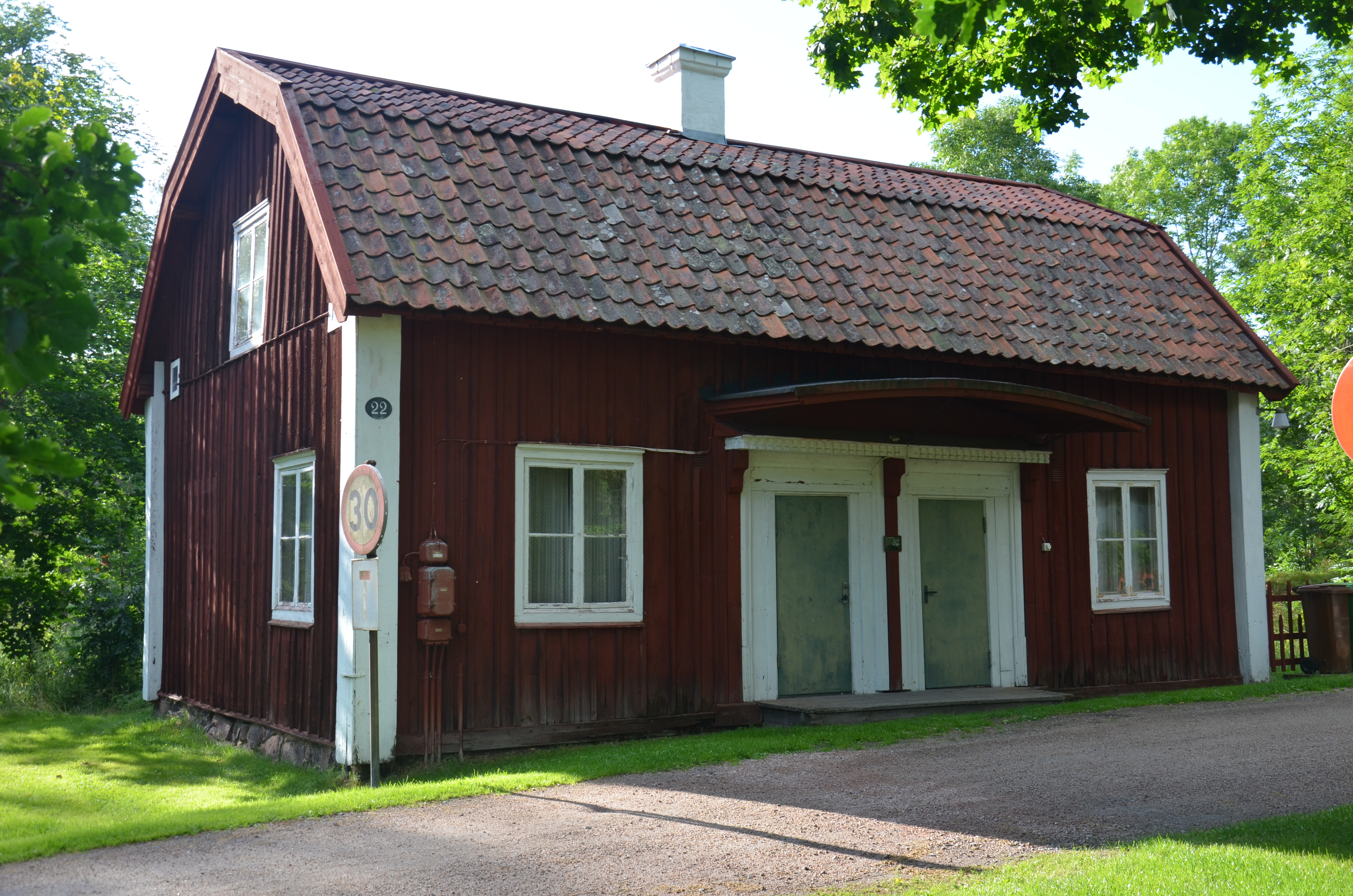
The old office

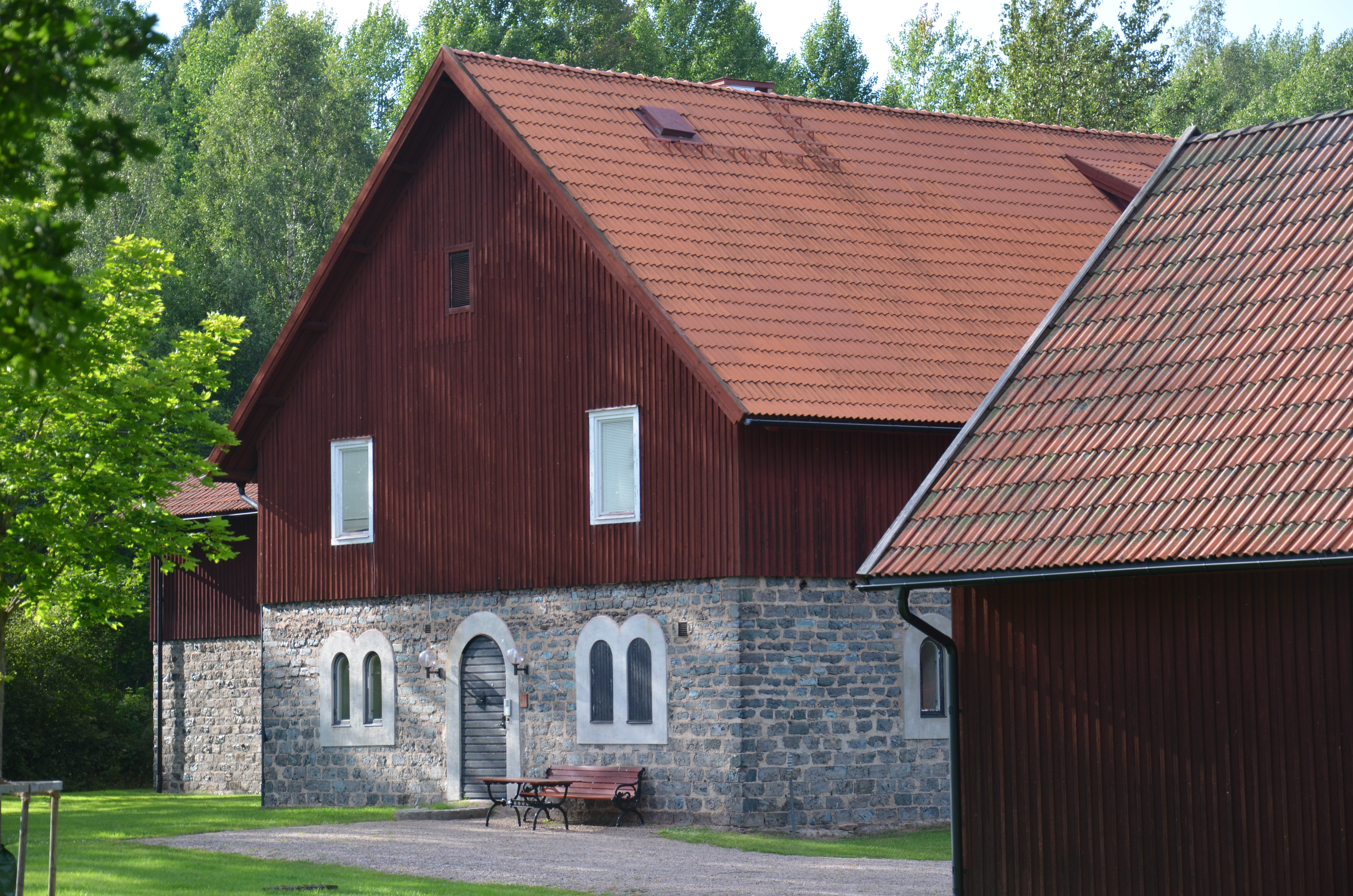
The archives of Axel Johnson Group

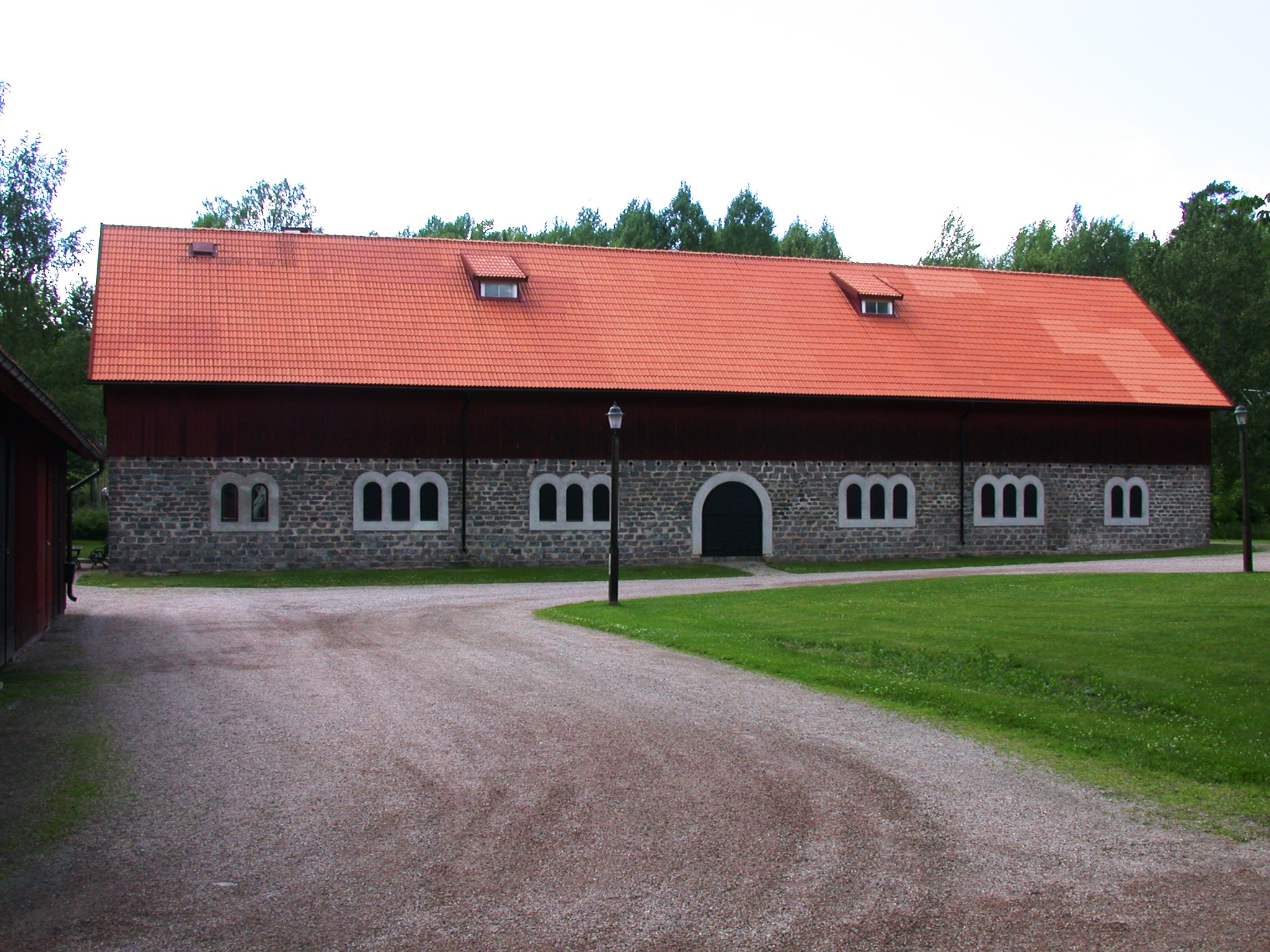
The old barn

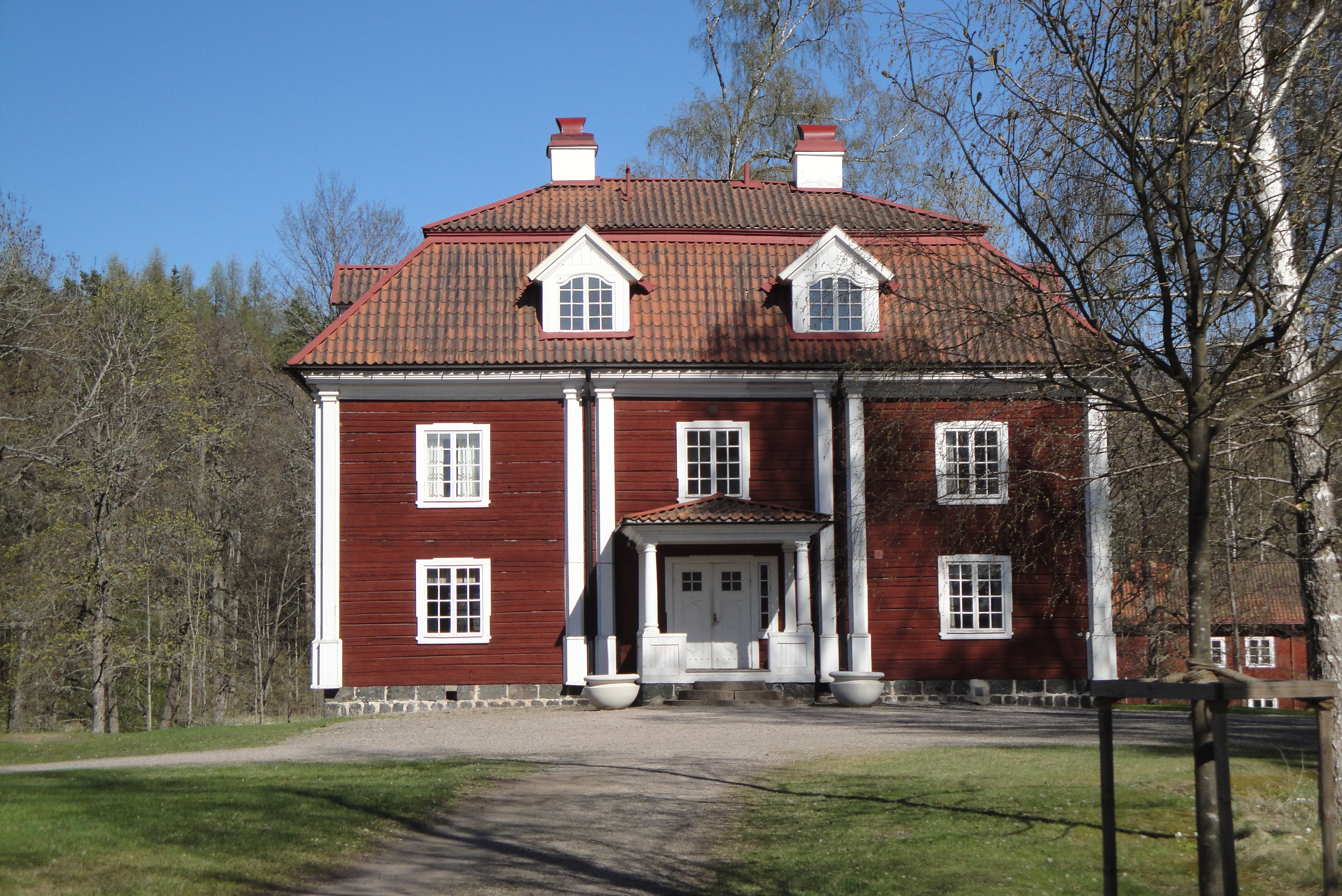
The new office

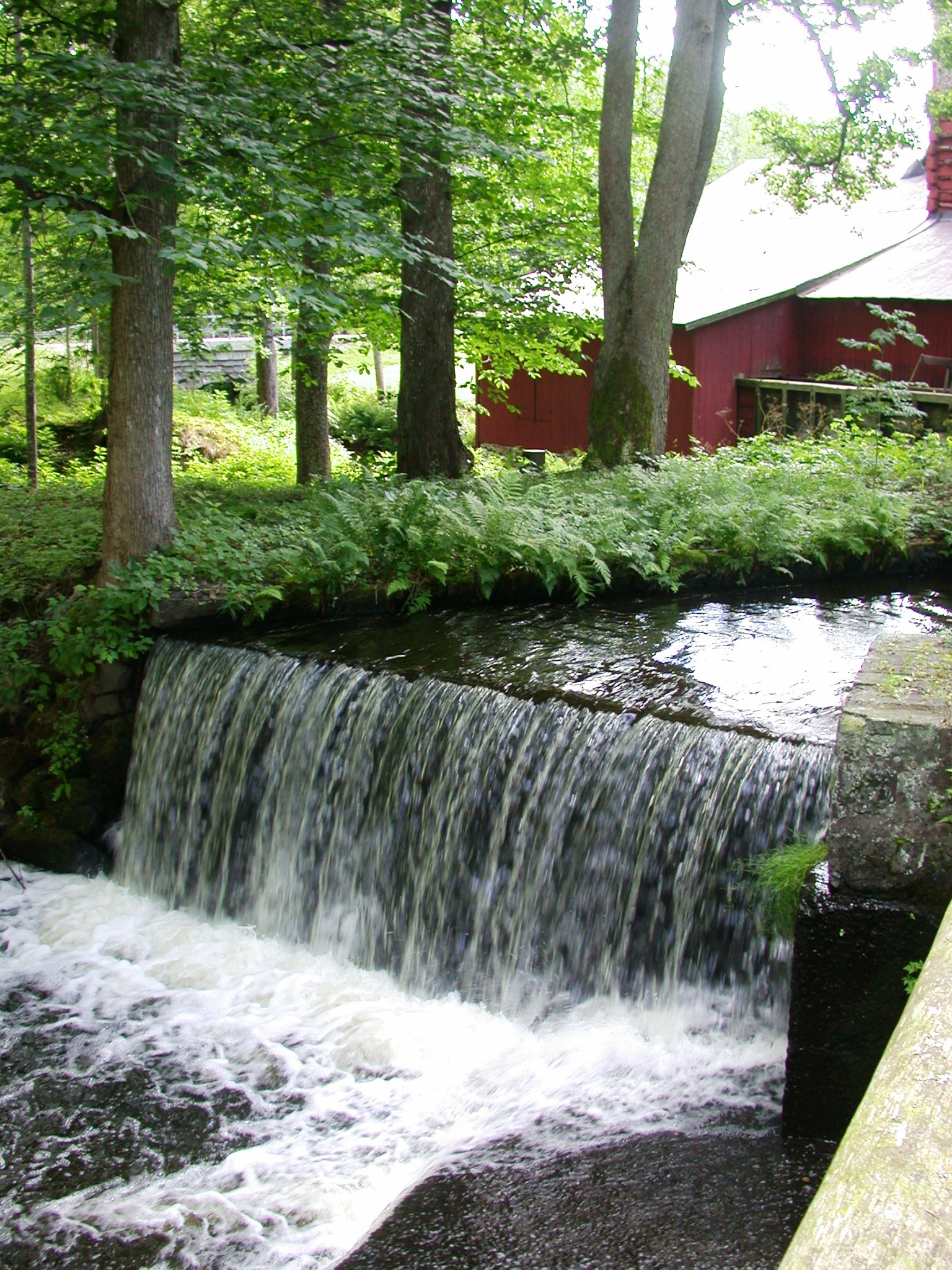
The dam and blast-furnace

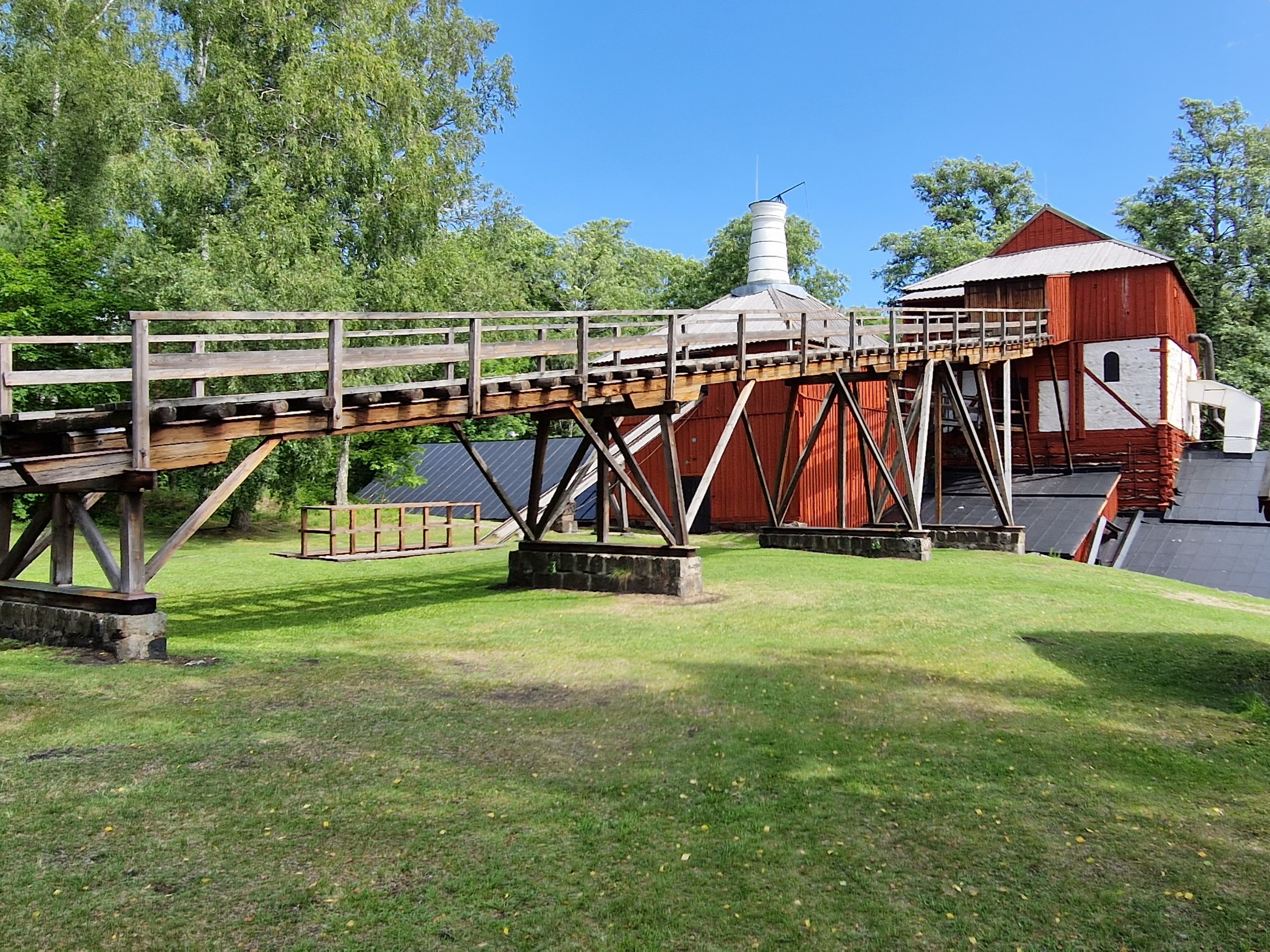
Rope railway for charcoal to the blast furnace

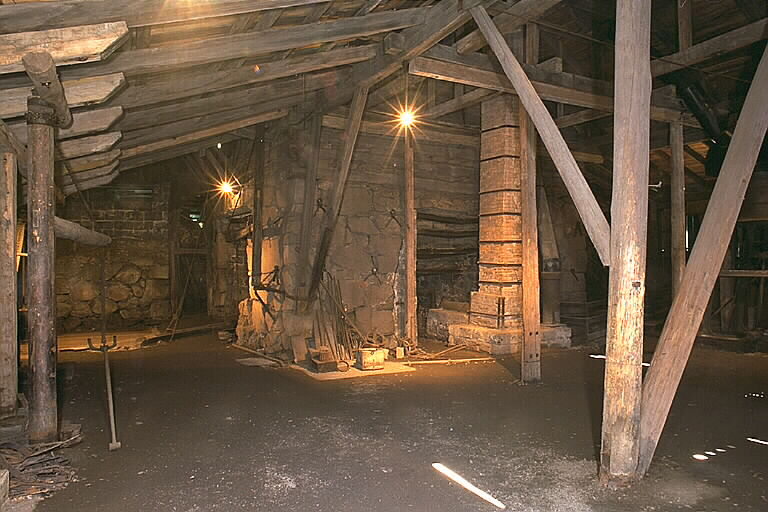
Casting house, blast furnace and air duct for preheated combustion air
