= List of industrial archaeology topics =

This is a list of topics typically studied by students of industrial archaeology.

It is grouped into industry sectors: Extractive, Manufacturing, Public Utilities, Transport, Miscellaneous.

== Extractive ==
=== Mining ===
- Adit
- Air vent
- Mine, Copper mine, Coal mine, Gold mine, Tin mine, Zinc mine
- Shaft mining

=== Quarrying ===
- Clayworks
- Sand pits
- Gravel pit
- Powder house

== Manufacturing ==
- Beam engine
- Brewery
- Brewing
- Brick kiln
- Cement works
- Creamery
- Dairy
- Distillery
- Distilling
- Factory
- Forge
- glass
- Granary
- Hopper
- Kiln
- Pottery
- Silk Industry
- Spinning, Spinning jenny, Spinning mill, Spinning mule
- Stationary engine
- Steam engine
- Warehouse
- Weaving, Loom, Jacquard loom, Dobby loom, Shaft loom, Power loom, Flying shuttle
- Windpump

=== Mills ===
- Boring mill
- Cotton mill
- Five-sail windmill
- Flax mill
- Flint mill
- Fulling mill - see Fulling
- Gristmill
- Hand mill
- Iron mill
- Lumber mill
- Millrace
- Mill engine
- Mill stone
- Oil mill
- Post mill
- Rolling mill
- Saw mill
- Smock mill
- Spinning mill
- Steel rolling mill
- Tailrace
- Textile mill
- Tide mill
- Tower mill
- Watermill
- Waterwheel
- Windmill
- Woollen mill

== Public Utilities ==
=== Electricity ===
- Power station
- Turbine

=== Gas ===
- Gasometer
- Retort house

=== Water ===
- Dam
- Pumping station
- Reservoir
- Sewage treatment
- Water treatment
- Water tower

=== Steam ===
- District heating

=== Hydraulic power ===
- Hydraulic power network

== Transport ==
=== Canals ===
- Aqueduct
- Canal basin
- Boat lift
- Bridge
- Canal lock
- Culvert
- Flash lock
- Flights of locks
- Inclined plane
- Spillover

=== Railways ===
- Air vent
- Ballast pit
- Bridge
- Buffer stops
- Carriage Shed
- Catch point
- Cattle Pens
- Crane
- Crossover
- Culvert
- Cutting
- Embankment
- Footbridge
- Gantry crane (Portainer)
- Goods area
- Goods store
- Ground frame
- Horse tram
- Inclined plane
- Junction (rail)
- Loading bank
- Locomotive shed
- Level crossing
- Milepost
- Platform
- Ropeway
- Signal box (Signal cabin)
- Station
- Station building
- Station house
- Subway
- Track
- Trackbed
- Tram
- Tunnel
- Turnout
- Turntable
- Underpass
- Viaduct
- Waiting room
- Water column
- Water tank
- Water tower

=== Marine ===
- Causeway
- Dry dock
- Dock
- Harbour
- Lighthouse
- Pier
- Pump house
- Quay
- Slipway
- Weir

=== Road ===
- Bridge
- Unused highway
- Toll road

== Miscellaneous ==
- Chimney
- Hydraulic pump
- Market house
- Weighbridge

== See also ==
- List of conservation topics
- Conservation in the United Kingdom
- History of science and technology
- Association for Industrial Archaeology
- Society for Industrial Archeology
