= Mattias Klum =

Swedish freelance photographer and film producer

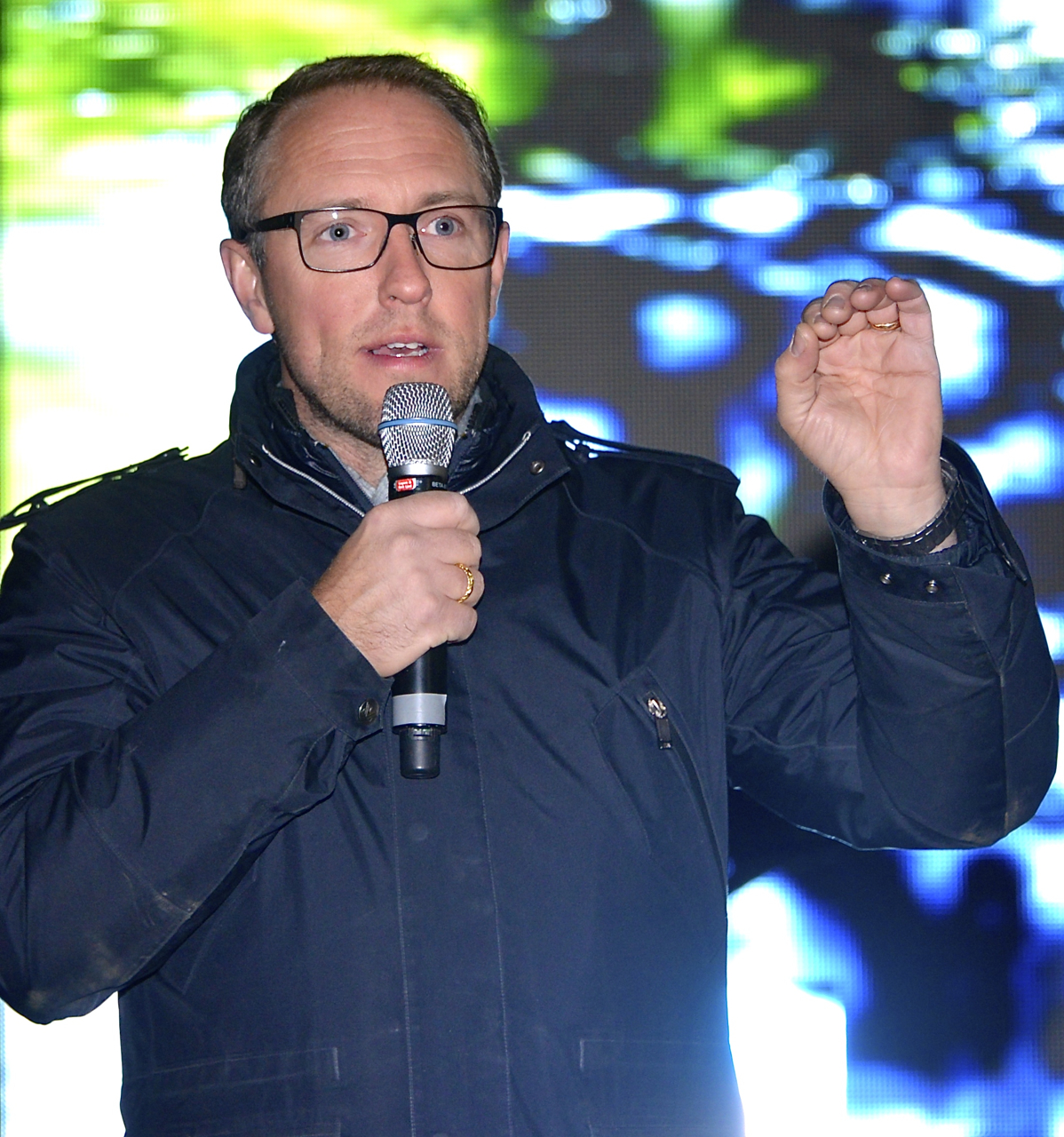
- Klum in 2014
- Born: 10 February 1968 (age 58)
- Occupations: Photographer and Filmmaker
- Website: Official website

Mattias Klum (born 10 February 1968 in Uppsala) is a Swedish freelance photographer and film producer in natural history and cultural subjects. He is the son of Swedish academic educator Arne Klum (1925-2016) and Ingegärd Klum, née Stefanson. Klum has worked full-time as a freelance photographer since 1986, and as a cinematographer and director on numerous film and television projects since 1994. Klum describes and portrays animals, plants, and natural and cultural settings in the form of articles, books, films, lectures and exhibitions.

Klum has had several wildlife documentaries shown internationally and has also had his work featured in Wildlife Conservation, Audubon, Geo, National Geographic, Terre sauvage, Stern, Der Spiegel and the New York Times among others.

In 1997, National Geographic Magazine published Mattias Klum's photographs for the first time, which made him the first Swede to have his work on the cover, then he was one of National Geographic's youngest contributors. Since 1997, he has produced a number of articles and twelve cover stories for the magazine, including "Malaysia's Secret Realm" (August 1997), "Asia's Last Lions" (June 2001), "Meerkats Stand Tall" (September 2002), "What Darwin Didn't Know" (February 2009), and "The Bite That Heals" (February 2013). Klum's photographs have been exhibited in one-man shows at reputable museums and art galleries in the US, Sweden, Malaysia, India, Japan, Great Britain, Estonia, Denmark, Botswana, Spain, China and Singapore among other countries. Klum has published twelve books, five of them available in English: Exploring the Rainforest, Borneo Rainforest, Horse People, Being There and The Human Quest.

In 2007, Klum contributed to the starting of a publishing company, Tierra Grande Publishing, the fundraising Terra Magna Foundation and Expeditionsverige.se (Expedition Sweden), a five-year-long environment and inspiration project about Sweden and the Baltic Sea Media Project together with producer Folke Rydén. He has also coached and collaborated with Sweden's Prince Carl Philip.

The book, The Human Quest: Prospering Within Planetary Boundaries, is co-authored by scientist and global sustainability expert Johan Rockström with a foreword by former President Bill Clinton.

Mattias Klum's latest book "Världar av Liv" was published in 2013 by Max Ström. In 2013 Klum has also been awarded an Honorary Doctorate degree in Natural Science by Stockholm University and named WWF, the World Wildlife Fund ambassador.

== Bibliography ==
- Moments 1990
- When the mist rises 1992
- A Journey through Sweden 1995
- Exploring the Rainforest 1995
- Borneo Rainforest 1997
- Inside Borneo 1999
- The Brittle Thread 2000
- Horse People 2003
- Being There 2007
- The Secret of Africa 2010
- The Human Quest: Prospering Within Planetary Boundaries 2012
- Världar av Liv 2013
- Big World Small Planet 2015
- Jordnära 2017
- Perpetual Calendar of Life 2018

== Filmography ==
- Borneo's Rainforest
- The Brittle Thread
- Search for the Sea Eagle
- The Linnaeus Expedition
- Music video project Funk for Life
- The Testament of Tebaran
- The Coral Eden
- The Contemplator
- Vamizi - Cradle of Coral

Klum has produced a number of documentary films including Borneo's Rainforest and The Brittle Thread (Asia's Last Lions) with his former wife and colleague Monika Klum and The Linnaeus Expedition with producer Folke Rydén. Klum and his team have collaborated on the music video project Funk for Life, with renowned musician Nils Landgren. This project supports Médecins Sans Frontières and their work in Kibera, Kenya.

== Performances ==
- Tales from Reality. Stockholm Concert Hall. 2017

== Family ==
Mattias Klum is a grandson of Stefan Anderson, and nephew of Birgit Ridderstedt. He has two sons with his former wife Monika Klum. He has also been married to artist and photographer Iris Alexandrov.

== Awards and Act of Honour ==
Over the years, Mattias Klum has received numerous awards and grants for his work.

- Uppsala City Council bestowed him with its gold medal for outstanding work from an Uppsala base, 2002.
- The King of Sweden granted Klum his medal of the 8th grade with a blue ribbon for his important contributions as a wildlife photographer, 2003.
- Fellow of The Linnean Society of London, 2006.
- The Uppsala County Administration granted him the title of Citizen of the Year in Uppland, 2007.
- Appointed Young Global Leader by the World Economic Forum, 2008.
- Fellow of National Geographic Society, 2010.
- Senior Fellow at Stockholm Resilience Centre, 2011.
- IUCN Goodwill Ambassador, 2011.
- Iwan Bolin Prize by Stockholm's Workers Institute, 2012.
- The Lidman Prize by Swedish Academy of Verbovisual Information, 2012.
- The Comprehensibility Prize by the Swedish communication agency Publik, 2012.
- Honorary doctor in Natural Science at Stockholm University, 2013.
- WWF, World Wildlife Fund Ambassador, 2013.

Klum is also a member of the Board of Trustees of WWF Sweden. He has held a position as a Guest Lecturer at Uppsala University and teaches at Stockholm Resilience Centre. The magazine Miljöaktuellt ranked Klum as number 4 of Sweden's 100 most powerful people working for the environment 2013.
