= Ludvika Town Hall =

Coordinates: 60°09′10″N 15°11′22″E

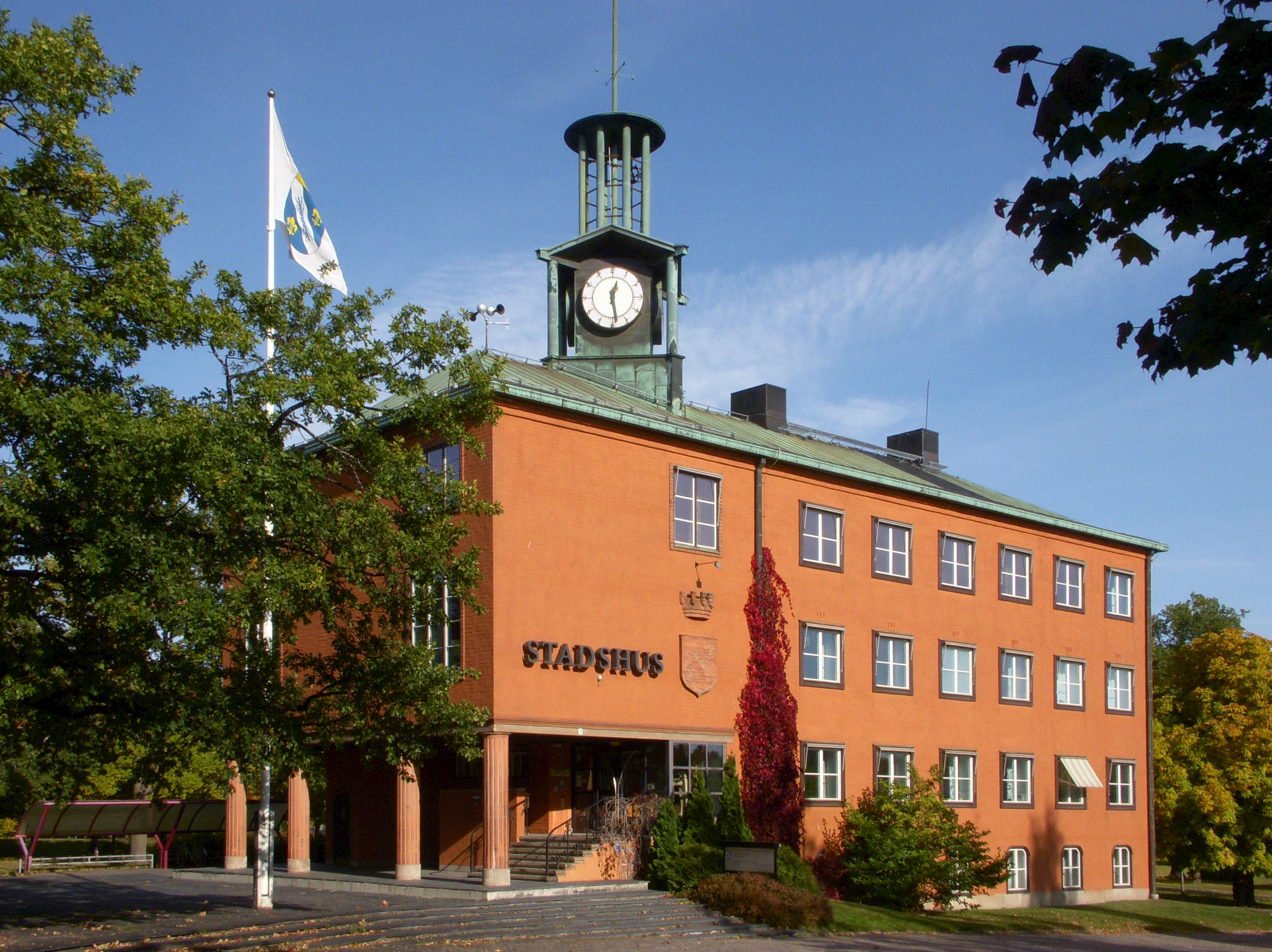
- The town hall in Ludvika, seen from the west
- Interactive map of the Ludvika Town Hall area

General information
- Architectural style: Brick Expressionism
- Location: Ludvika, Sweden
- Construction started: 1936
- Completed: 1938
- Client: City of Ludvika

Design and construction
- Architect: Cyrillus Johansson

Ludvika Town Hall (Swedish: Ludvika stadshus) is the official Municipal Council building for the City of Ludvika in Dalarna County, Sweden. Situated centrally, the town hall is found in the corner of Bangatan and Dan Anderssons gata, opposite Ludvika Ulrica, the local parish church. The town hall was designed in 1934 by architect Cyrillus Johansson, (city architect 1931–1941), with construction commencing in 1936. The building was completed in 1938 and remains in use as town hall to this day. Due to the small size of the building, the Municipal Council no longer convenes its meetings in the building but uses the local Peoples' House (Swedish: Folkets Hus) instead.

== Exterior ==
A student of National Romanticism architecture, Cyrillus Johansson applied a restrained form of Brick Expressionism to his town hall design – one of three official buildings he designed for the municipality. The west-facing tetrastyle portico is in fact a folly with the entrance off-set to the south-facing west corner. Sculptured in brick above each of the first-floor windows are mural crowns proclaiming the then city's Royal Charter (1919–1971). The building comprises four floors with a square clock tower rising centre above the ridged verdigris copper roof. Giving the four columns of the portico a closer scrutiny will reveal a dog pattern in the tiled medallions – these were made by the builders in honour of their mascot, a stray they called Stella, who also stands immortalised as a statue in the town hall garden. The forecourt, located by the west gavel, is layered with large slate tiles on a bed of gravel long overgrown with grass.

== Clock Tower ==
As the middle section of the clock tower, where the dials are, is narrower than the base on which it stands and its roof above, the tower's square ridged copper roof has four overhanging eaves, each of which are supported by an exposed, exoskeleton copper column resting on the tower's square base. On top of the clock's roof stands the open-to-air bell tower surrounded by a circle of eight copper pillars and a single bell hangs within. The bell tower is crowned with a circular copper roof upon which a copper spire rises with a dragon-head weather wane, also in copper. The turret clock (mechanism) was manufactured by Linderoths Urverk (Stockholm) in 1937 and after face design and adjustment by Stefan Anderson was installed in 1938. All four dials and the bell were driven from the same mechanism. In 1976, the town council appointed local watchmaker Karl-Arne Carlsson from Grängesberg as the town's first official Timekeeper, responsible for maintaining the Town Hall Clock. In late 2004 the mechanical turret clock was retired together with its keeper, and replaced with a self-maintaining digital timepiece controlling five independent electrical mechanisms, one for each dial and the bell.
