= Klum =

Klum is a surname. Notable people with the surname include:

- Heidi Klum (born 1973), German model
- Johanna Klum (born 1980), German TV personality
- Leni Klum (born 2004), German and American fashion model
- Mattias Klum (born 1968), Swedish photographer and film producer
- Otto Klum (1892–1944), American football coach

== Fictional ==
- Francis Klum, a comic book villain better known as the third Mysterio
