= Stefan Andersson =

Stefan Andersson may refer to:

- Stefan Andersson (speedway rider) (born 1971), former Swedish speedway rider
- Stefan Andersson (singer) (born 1967), Swedish singer and songwriter
- Stefan Andersson (bandy) (born 1969), Swedish bandy player

== See also ==
- Stefan Anderson (1878–1966), Swedish industrialist, journalist and master craftsman watchmaker
