= Deltaco =

Swedish computer hardware company

- Industry: Electronics
- Founded: 1991; 35 years ago in Ludvika, Sweden
- Website: www.deltaco.eu

Deltaco is a Swedish computer hardware company founded in Ludvika in 1991, incorporated under the name Swedeltaco AB as well as Dist IT. Originally it mainly imported Taiwanese cables for resale, but came to both produce and sell its own products across a variety of product lines. In 2011, its own products stood for 40% of its revenue. In 2007 it launched across the Nordic countries as DELTACO, and in 2017 it released its own line of gaming peripherals, Deltaco Gaming.

Deltaco has previously advocated against expensive cables, stating that: "when it comes to digital signals, either the signal arrives, or it doesn't", and that there is no need to pay more for cables for audiophiles or video-enthusiasts.
