= Saint Lucy's Day =

Christian feast day

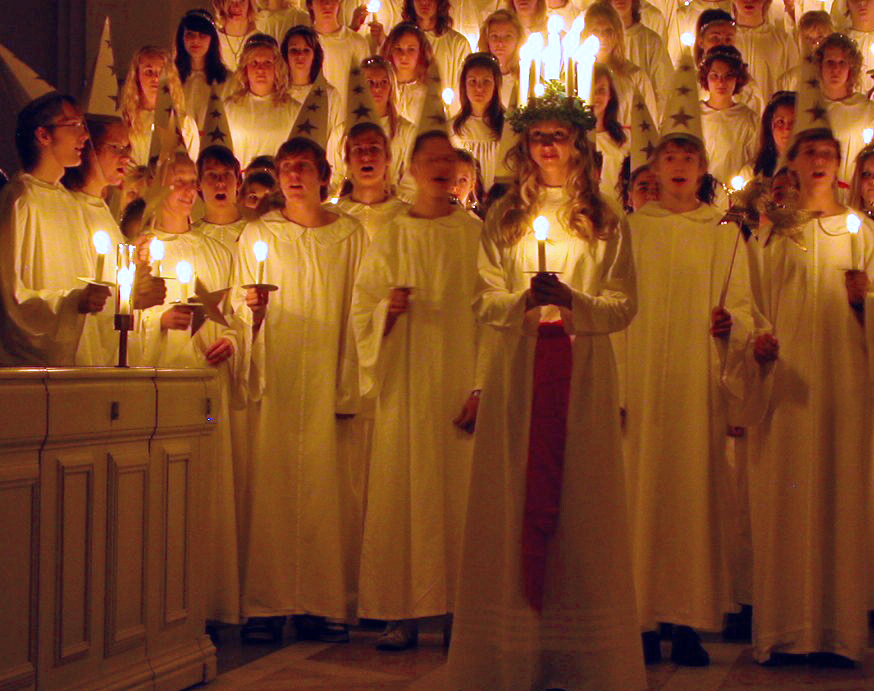
- Celebration of Saint Lucy's Day in an Evangelical-Lutheran Church of Sweden congregation in December 2006
- Observed by: Roman Catholics, Lutherans, and Anglicans among others
- Liturgical color: Red
- Type: Christian
- Date: 13 December
- Next time: 13 December 2026
- Duration: one day
- Frequency: Annual

Saint Lucy's Day, also called the Feast of Saint Lucy, is a Christian feast day observed on 13 December. The observance commemorates Lucia of Syracuse, an early-fourth-century virgin martyr under the Diocletianic Persecution. According to legend, she brought food and aid to persecuted Christians hiding in the Roman catacombs, wearing a candle-lit wreath on her head to light her way, leaving both hands free to carry as much food as possible. Because her name means "light" and her feast day had at one time coincided with the shortest day of the year prior to calendar reforms, it is now widely celebrated as a festival of light. (Note: Crump (2022/4th ed.) (2006/3rd ed.) s.v. "Advent", quote: "Prior to the adoption of the Gregorian calendar in the sixteenth century, St. Lucy's Day fell on the winter solstice, which poses a factor in her association with light, and her day Christianized a day formerly associated with the pagan Germanic goddess Berchta ...")

Falling within the Advent season, Saint Lucy's Day is viewed as a precursor of Christmastide, pointing to the arrival of the Light of Christ in the calendar on 25 December, Christmas Day.

Saint Lucy's Day is celebrated most widely in Sweden and its neighboring countries, Italy, and the island nation of Saint Lucia, each emphasising a different aspect of her story. In Scandinavia, where Lucy is called Santa/Sankta Lucia, she is represented as a woman in a white dress symbolizing a baptismal robe and a red sash symbolizing the blood of her martyrdom, with a crown or wreath of candles on her head.

In Sweden, Norway, Denmark and Finland, as songs are sung, girls dressed as Saint Lucy carry cookies and saffron buns in procession, which symbolizes bringing the Light of Christ into the world's darkness. The first modern-day Scandinavian Saint Lucy's celebration was held in 1928 at the open air museum Skansen in Stockholm. In both Catholic and Protestant churches, boys participate in the procession as well, playing different roles associated with Christmastide, such as that of Saint Stephen or generic gingerbread men, Santa Clauses, or nisses. The celebration of Saint Lucy's Day is said to help one live the winter days with enough light.

A special devotion to Saint Lucy is practised in the Italian regions of Lombardy, Emilia-Romagna, Veneto, Friuli-Venezia Giulia, Trentino-Alto Adige (in Northern Italy), and Sicily (in Southern Italy), as well as in the Croatian coastal region of Dalmatia. In Hungary and Croatia, a popular tradition on Saint Lucy's Day involves planting wheat grains that grow to be several centimetres tall by Christmas Day, representing the Nativity of Jesus.

Saint Lucy's Day is followed by the Ember Days.

== Origins ==
An inscription in Syracuse dedicated to Euskia mentioning St. Lucy's Day as a local feast dates back to the fourth century A.D., which states "Euskia, the irreproachable, lived a good and pure life for about 25 years, died on my Saint Lucy's feast day, she for whom I cannot find appropriate words of praise: she was a Christian, faithful, perfection itself, full of thankfulness and gratitude". The Feast of Saint Lucy became a universal feast of the Church in the 6th century, commemorating the Christian martyr's death on 13 December 304 A.D. St. Lucy's day appears in the sacramentary of Gregory, as well as that of Bede, and Christian churches were dedicated to Saint Lucy in Italy as well as in England.

Later, Christian missionaries arrived in Scandinavia to evangelize the local population, carrying the commemoration of Saint Lucy with them, and this "story of a young girl bringing light in the midst of darkness no doubt held great meaning for people who, in the midst of a North Sea December, were longing for the relief of warmth and light". Saint Lucy is one of very few saints still celebrated by the overwhelmingly Lutheran Nordic people — Danes; Swedes; Finns and Norwegians but also in the United States and Canada and Italy. Some of the practices associated with the Feast of Saint Lucy may predate the adoption of Christianity in that region, and like much of Scandinavian folklore and even religiosity, is centred on the annual struggle between light and darkness. The Nordic observation of St. Lucy is first attested in the Middle Ages, and continued after the Protestant Reformation in the 1520s and 1530s, although the modern celebration is only about 200 years old. It is likely that tradition owes its popularity in the Nordic countries to the extreme change in daylight hours between the seasons in this region.

=== 13 December ===
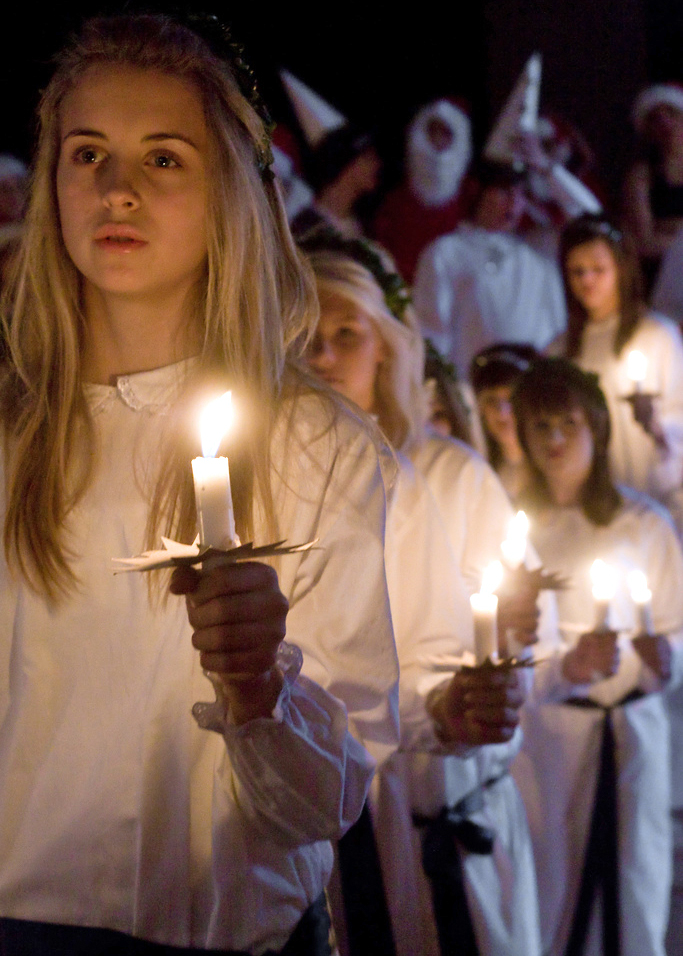
A Saint Lucy procession in Sweden, 2007

In Scandinavia (until as late as the mid 18th century) this date was the longest night of the year, coinciding with Winter Solstice, due to the Julian Calendar being employed at that time. The same can be seen in the poem "A Nocturnal upon S. Lucy's Day, Being the Shortest Day" by the English poet John Donne.

While this does not hold for the current Gregorian calendar, a discrepancy of eight days would have been the case in the Julian calendar during the 14th century, resulting in Winter solstice falling on 13 December. With the original adoption of the Gregorian calendar in the 16th century the discrepancy was ten days and had increased to 11 days in the 18th century when Scandinavia adopted the new calendar, with the Winter solstice falling on 21 December.

The Winter solstice is not visibly shorter than the several days leading up to and following it and although the actual Julian date of Winter solstice would have been on 15 or 14 December at the time when Christianity was introduced to Scandinavia, 13 December could well have lodged in people's mind as being the shortest day.

The choice of 13 December as Saint Lucy's Day, however, predates the eight-day error of the 14th-century Julian calendar. This date is attested in the pre-Tridentic Monastic calendar, probably going back to the earliest attestations of her life in the sixth and seventh centuries, and it is the date used throughout Europe. So, while the world changed from a Julian to a Gregorian calendar system—and hence acquired a new date for the Winter Solstice—St Lucy's Day was kept on 13 December, and not moved to the 21.

In the Roman Empire, 25 December (in the Julian Calendar) date was celebrated as being the day when the Sun was born, the birthday of Sol Invictus, as can be seen in the Chronography of 354. This date corresponds to the Winter solstice. Early Christians considered this a likely date for their saviour's nativity, as it was commonly held that the world was created on Spring equinox (thought to fall on 25 March at the time), and that Christ had been conceived on that date, being born nine months later on Winter solstice.

A Swedish source states that the date of (Winter Solstice, St. Lucia, Lucinatta, Lucia-day, Lussi-mass...) i.e. 13 December, predates the Gregorian which implies that "Lucia's Day" was 13 Dec in the Julian Calendar, which is equal to 21 December in the Gregorian, i.e. now. Same source states use of the name "Little Yule" for the day, that it was among the most important days of the year, that it marked the start of Christmas month, and that with the move to the Gregorian calendar (in Sweden 1753) the date (not the celebration) "completely lost its appropriateness/significance".

=== Saint Lucy ===
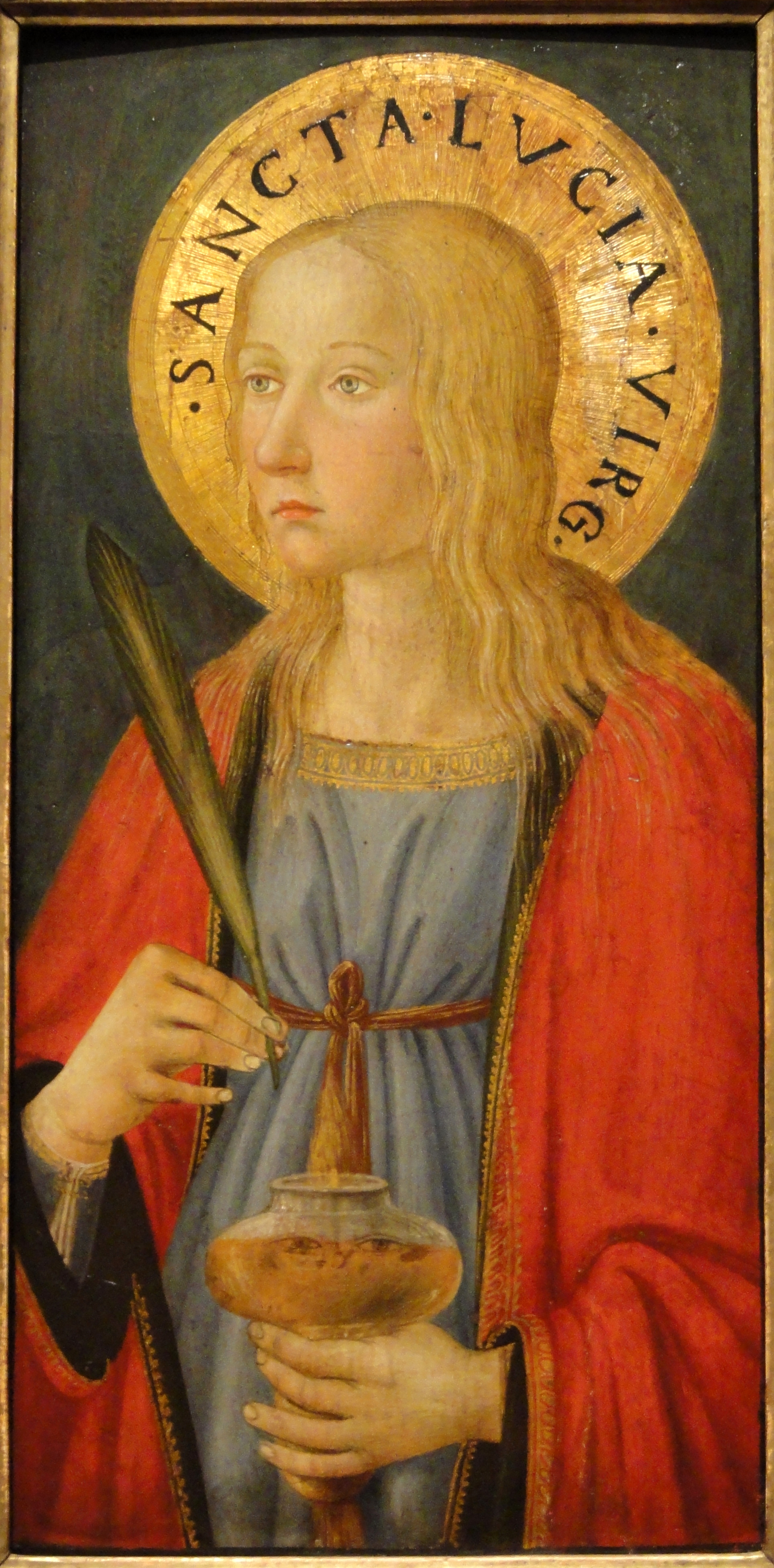
Lucy by Cosimo Rosselli, Florence, c. 1470, tempera on panel

According to the traditional story, Lucy was born of rich and noble parents in about the year 283. Her father was of Roman origin, but died when she was five years old, leaving Lucy and her mother without a protective guardian. Although no sources for her life story exist other than in hagiographies, St. Lucy, whose name Lucia refers to "light" (Lux, lucis), is known to have been a Sicilian saint who suffered a sad death in Siracusa, Sicily, around AD 310. A devout Christian who had taken a vow of virginity, her mother betrothed her to a pagan. She was seeking help for her mother's long-term illness at the shrine of Saint Agatha when the saint appeared to her in a dream beside the shrine. Saint Agatha told Lucy that the illness would be cured through faith, and Lucy was able to convince her mother to cancel the wedding and donate the dowry to the poor. Enraged, her suitor then reported her to the governor for being a Christian. According to the legend, she was threatened to be taken to a brothel if she did not renounce her Christian beliefs, but they were unable to move her, even with a thousand men and fifty oxen pulling. Instead, they stacked materials for a fire around her and set light to it, but she would not stop speaking, insisting that her death would lessen the fear of it for other Christians and bring grief to non-believers. One of the soldiers stuck a spear through her throat to stop these denouncements, but to no effect. Another gouged out her eyes in an attempt to force her into complacency, but her eyes were miraculously restored. Saint Lucy was able to die only when she was given the Christian Last Rites.

In one story, Saint Lucy was working to help Christians hiding in the catacombs during the terror under the Roman Emperor Diocletian, and in order to bring with her as many supplies as possible, she needed to have both hands free. She solved this problem by attaching candles to a wreath on her head.

Saint Lucy is often depicted in art with a palm as the symbol of martyrdom.

== Celebration ==
=== Italy ===
Catholic celebrations take place on 13 December and in May. Saint Lucy or Lucia, whose name comes from the Latin word "lux" meaning light, links with this element and with the days growing longer after the Winter solstice.

St. Lucy is the patron saint of the city of Siracusa, Sicily. On 13 December a silver statue of St. Lucy containing her relics is paraded from the Cathedral of Syracuse to the Basilica of Santa Lucia Outside the Walls, before returning on 20 December. Sicilians recall a legend that holds that a famine ended on her feast day when ships loaded with grain entered the harbour. Here, it is traditional to eat whole grains instead of bread on 13 December. This usually takes the form of cuccìa, a dish of boiled wheat berries often mixed with ricotta and honey, or sometimes served as a savoury soup with beans.

St. Lucy is also popular in some regions of North-Eastern Italy, namely Trentino, East Lombardy (Bergamo, Brescia, Cremona, Lodi and Mantua), parts of Veneto (Verona), parts of Emilia-Romagna (Piacenza, Parma, Reggio Emilia and Bologna), and all of Friuli, where she is said to bring gifts to good children and coal to bad ones the night between 12 and 13 December. According to tradition, she arrives in the company of a donkey and her escort, Castaldo. Children are asked to leave some coffee for Lucia, a carrot for the donkey and a glass of wine for Castaldo. They must not watch Santa Lucia delivering these gifts, or she will throw ashes in their eyes, temporarily blinding them.

=== In the Nordic countries ===
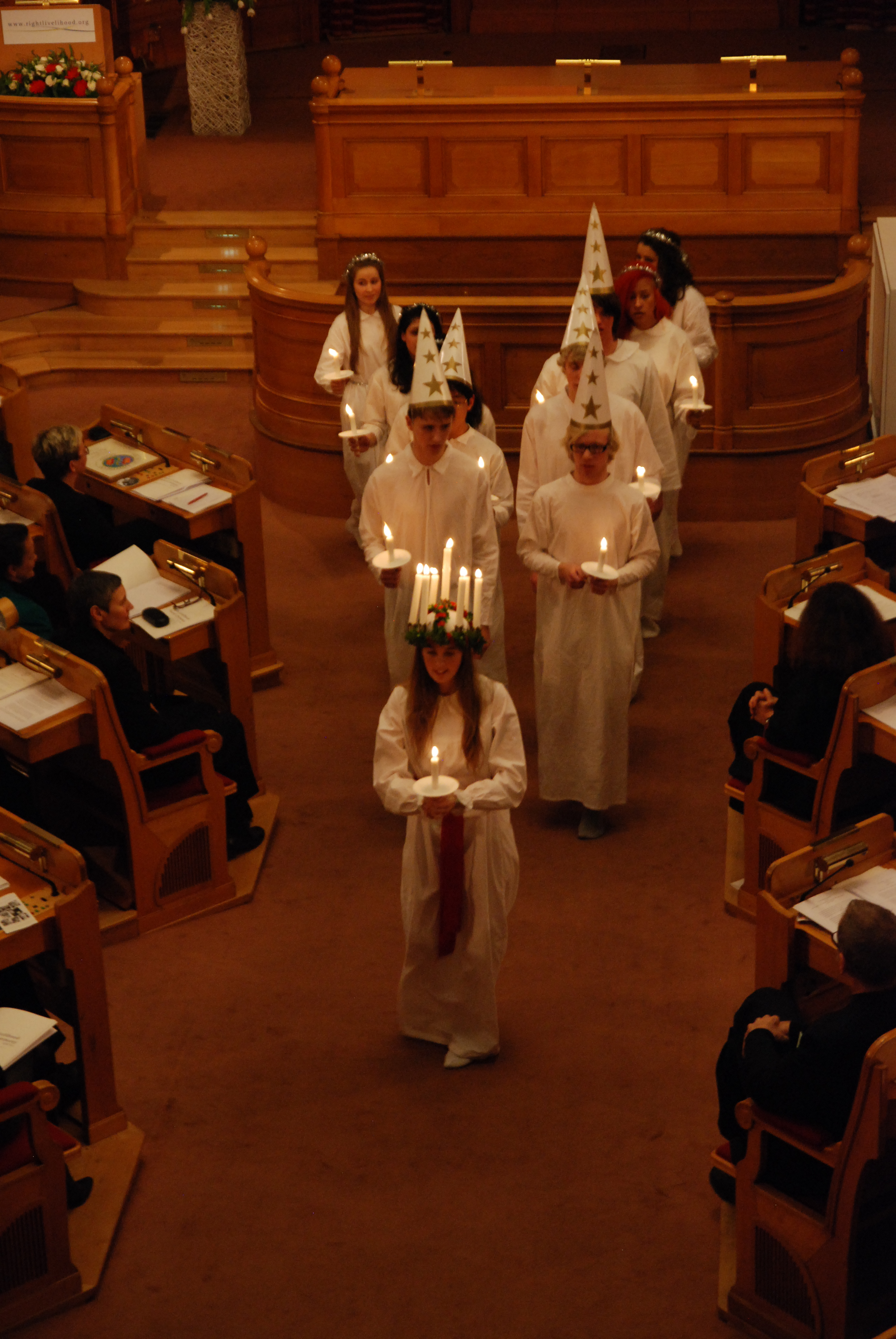
Lucia procession at a meeting in the Swedish parliament. The so-called "star boys" follow Lucia in the procession.

The celebration of Lucia in its current format began in the 20th century and gained popularity in 1927 after a Stockholm newspaper (Stockholms Dagblad) sponsored a competition to select the official Lucia for the city. (Note: Peebles (2006), p. 109 and p. 115 paraphrasing (in Swedish) info from Skansen website (2006b)) (Note: Cf. Melotti (2025))

On 13 December, Lucia is venerated in Sweden, Norway, Denmark, and Finland; also among Swedish Americans (cf. subsection for each country below, including § United States)) In the ceremony a girl designated as the Lucia (Lussi, or "Lussi bride") wears a white gown with a red sash and a crown of candles and walks at the head of a procession of women and men holding candles.

The choir sings a repertoire of certain Lucia songs (cf. § caroling under Sweden). Each Scandinavian country as well as Finland have lyrics in their native tongues. After finishing this procession, Christmas carols or more songs about Lucia are sung.

The modern Lussi bride ceremony did not gain popularity and momentum outside Sweden until after World War II.

=== Sweden ===
St. Lucy's Day is now a widely celebrated festivity in Sweden, held within families, at schools, at congregations, or on the community level, the Lucia enactor or processions appearing in facilities from clubs, business offices, shopping malls to senior homes, to perform songs or distribute baked goodies. Although not an official national public holiday in Sweden, many schools dismiss students at midday so they can prepare for the Lucia festivities.

==== Lucia breakfast ====
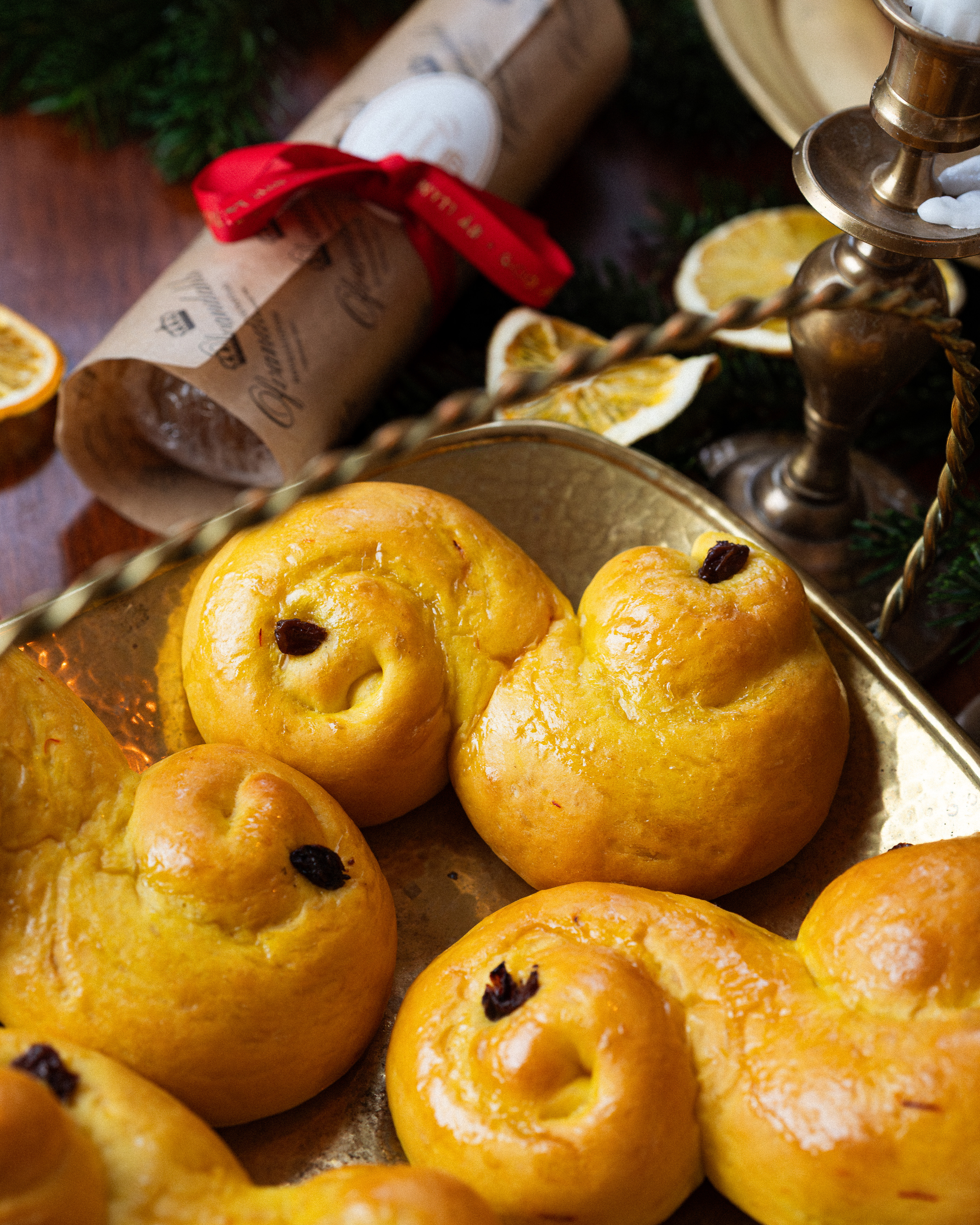
Lussekatter

Central to the modern celebration is a girl chosen to be dressed up as Lucia, clad in white dress with a crimson sash around her waist, wearing a crown of lit candles and lingonberry leaf wreath. In the home, this role of Lucia is usually played by the eldest daughter. This Lucia is assigned with the role of bringing breakfast to the household members, a tray with coffee, lit candles, and the saffron bun or Lussekatt (Note: Plural: Lussekatter; lit. 'Lucia's cat' (generally S-shaped buns with raisins to represent the cat's eyes,) cf. photo right) and perhaps singing a song to awaken them. In larger-scale enactments constituting a procession, the chosen Lucia is accompanied by the stjärngossar ("star boys") carrying lanterns, and a whole retinue of younger girls dressed in white.

Lucia in Sweden in a few locations is colloquially called Lussi (Lusse, Lussia), or perhaps rather Lussebrud ("Lusse bride). The standalone "Lussi" and "Lusse" may connote the frightening type of role in earlier folk practices, where the (dark, or "black" manifestation of) Lusse would be dressed like a goat-woman or julbock-woman, as according Terry Gunnel, but as those practices are an eclectic mix of folk beliefs, not strictly a Christian ceremony, it falls beyond the purview of this article, and thus discussed at Lutzelfrau § Sweden.

Standard baked goods for the feast day in Sweden, besides the Lussekatt, is the pepparkaka (ginger snaps), and for drink, there is the coffee and also the glögg (type of spiced or mulled wine).

==== Swedish history ====
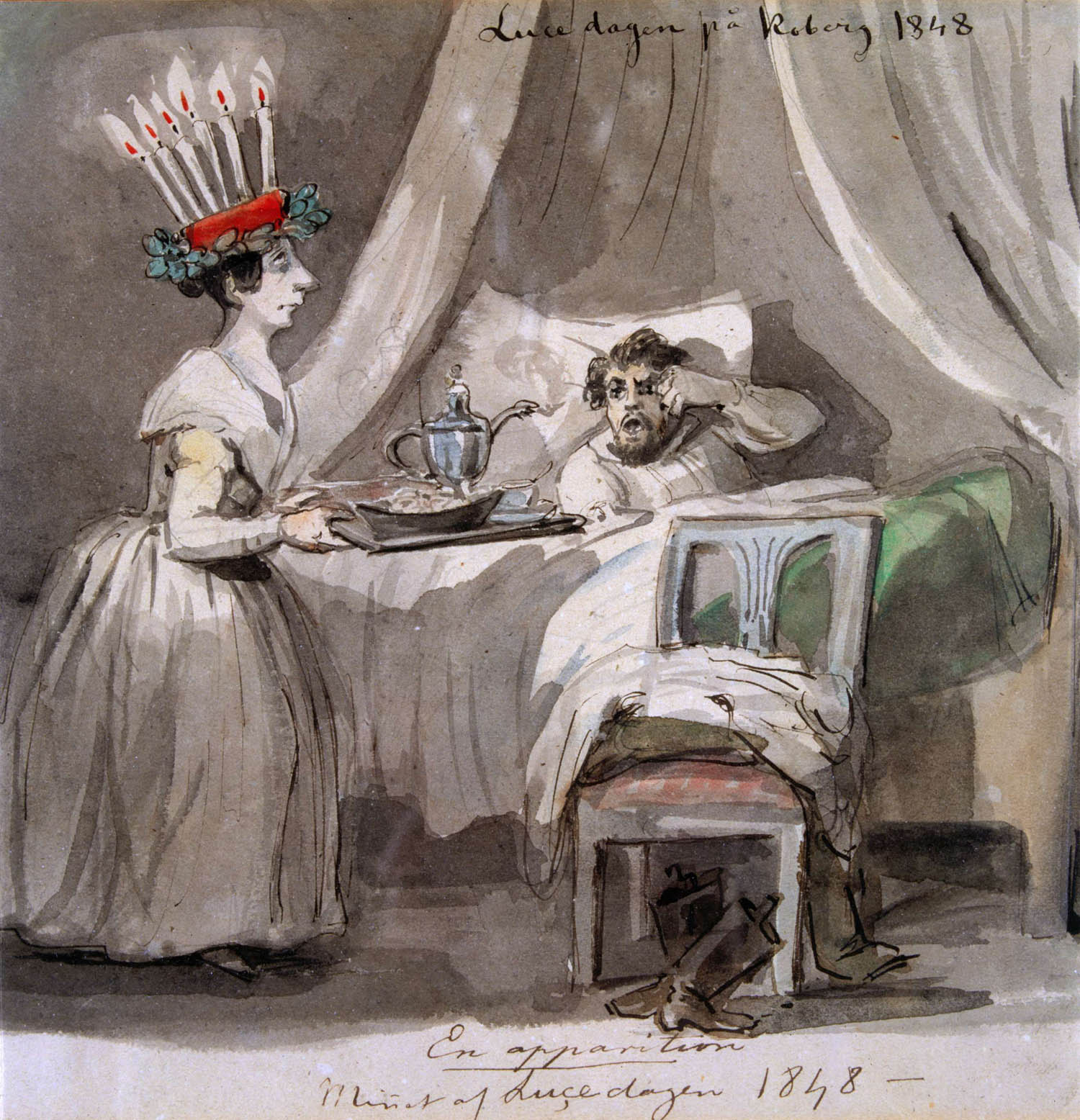
Saint Lucy's Day 1848 by Fritz von Dardel

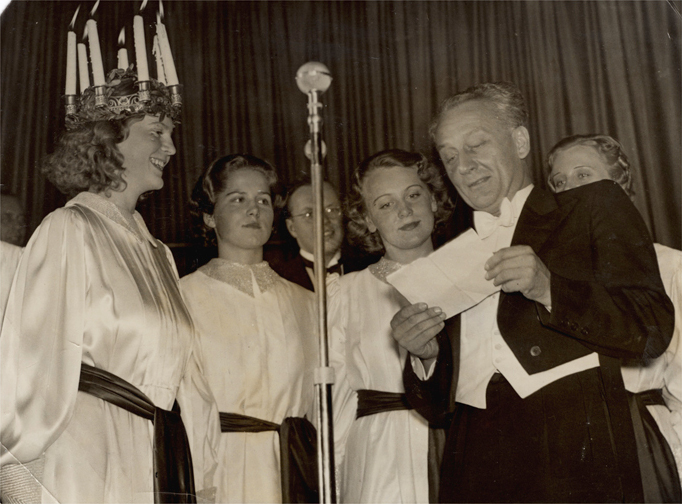
Albert Szent-Györgyi, who won the Nobel Prize in Physiology or Medicine in 1937, here at that year's Saint Lucy celebration in Stockholm

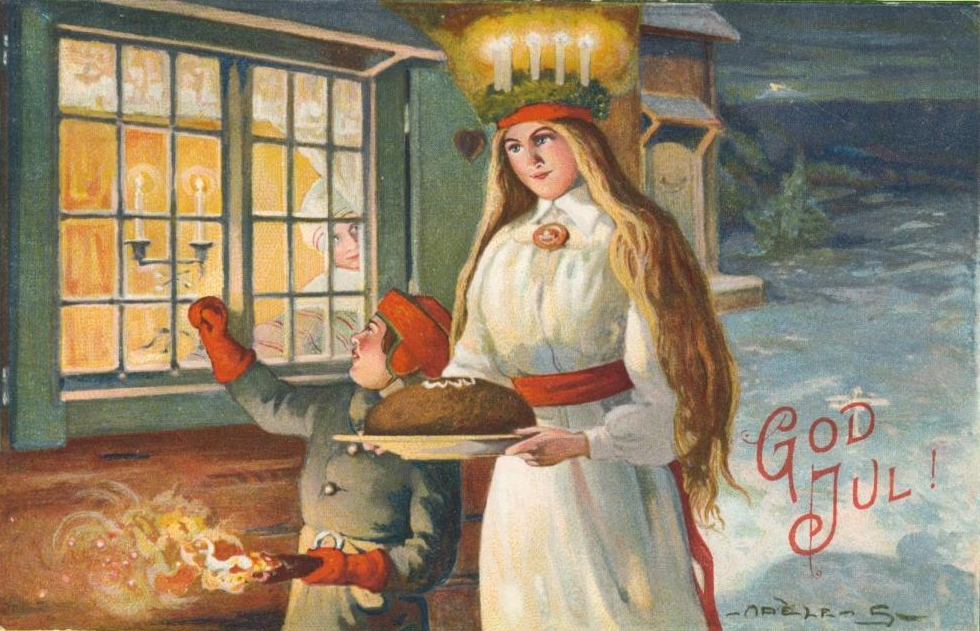
Christmas season card with Lucia in the snow

It has been claimed (by some) that the celebration of this day may go as far back as c. 1000, a conflation of the pagan observance of the winter solstice (cf. Jul) and the Christian saint's feast day. The date December 13 was marked as St. Lucy's Day in the Middle Ages, under the old (Julian) calendar, when it coincided with the solstice. When Sweden adopted the new (Gregorian) calendar in 1753, this shifted the date of solstice to around December 22, but the St. Lucy's still remained to be held on the 13th. St. Lucy's Day celebration gained foothold around the 17th or 18th century, introduced into Swedish shore from Germany. (Note: "brought to western Sweden from Germany in the eighteenth century", citing Wolf-Knuts (2007), p. 60.) The theory advanced by the governmental Swedish Institute is that when the Protestant Reformation forbade the veneration of saints, the German had to shift the date of Christmas gift-giving from St. Nicholas's Day on December 6 to the 25th, thus likewise, in German-influenced areas of Sweden in the 17th and 18th centuries, the Swedes adopted a girl dressed in a white tunic with a wreath of candles in her hair, not as the saint, but ostensibly by in the role of the Christ child. A more elaborate explanation attributes the influence of the almost defunct (Note: Wall says the Christkind custom survives in Nurmeberg.)German custom of the Kindchen Jesus, or dressing up a child as Christkind (reenacting the superstition that the child Jesus goes around punishing or rewarding children according to what they deserved). This custom imported into Sweden became Kinken Jes, where Kinken was likely a corruption of (Low German) kindken (diminutive of "child"), but kinken also had the dialectical meaning of "gift" (derived from Finnish kenkki "gift"). Thus, the theory goes, this Christ/Gift Jesus was eventually converted into the breakfast-delivering daughter Lucia, (Note: Cf. Perry (2020), Wall (2025): "One idea is that Lucia may have been inspired by the German.. Christkind (child Jesus) figure that replaced St Nicholas as the bringer of gifts..") combined with the "Carnival" custom of gorging on seven breakfasts (lussebete) before entering into the Christmas fast.

There is also the legend of a "white-robed maiden encircled with light" (—no doubt she was Lucia) aboard large ship which traversed Lake Vänern during a famine in Värmland, distributing foods to the hungry. Hence, Värmland is considered an epicenter of the Lucia cult. (Note: Baron Joachim Beck-Friis (1861–1939) stating "We never celebrated Lucia in my family even though my mother came from Värmland". His mother did have to play Lucia in her youth.) Nobel laureate Selma Lagerlöf wrote her Legend of St. Lucia (Lucialegenden) set in Värmland, and the celebration was still observed in the region up to the 1920s.

Though the Lucia celebration was made fashionable by the Swedish upper-class during the 19th century, it was clearly generally becoming outmoded by the early 20th century. (Note: Miles (1913): "In Sweden St. Lucia's Day was formerly marked by some interesting practices".) (Note: Cf. Mortensen (1922) that remained a tradition in Värmland, implying it has largely discontinued elsewhere.) (Note: Cf. Baron Beck-Friis (1861–1939)'s comment that he himself never experienced Lucia while growing up.)

The celebration of St. Lucia's Day regained popularity after 1927 when the Stockholms Dagblad newspaper began sponsoring the annual competition to select an official Lucia for Stockholm, and this ceremony grew into one of a pompous procession through the streets followed by the crowning at city hall. (Note: Peebles (2006), p. 109 and p. 115 paraphrasing (in Swedish) from Skansen website) The ceremony began to involve current Nobel Prize winners to perform the crowning of the Miss Lucia title winners in Sweden and abroad, e.g., the U. S. (cf. photo left). (Note: e.g. Nelly Sachs who won in 1966.) The selection of "Sweden's Lucia" began in 1973, sponsored by the Året Runt weekly magazine, but the sponsorship was later overtaken by a television channel. Currently the crowning of the national Lucia takes place at the Skansen, an open-air museum. A local Lucia is now selected in practically every region and township, and out of these preliminary contests, seven are selected as finalists to compete in the nationals.

==== Caroling ====
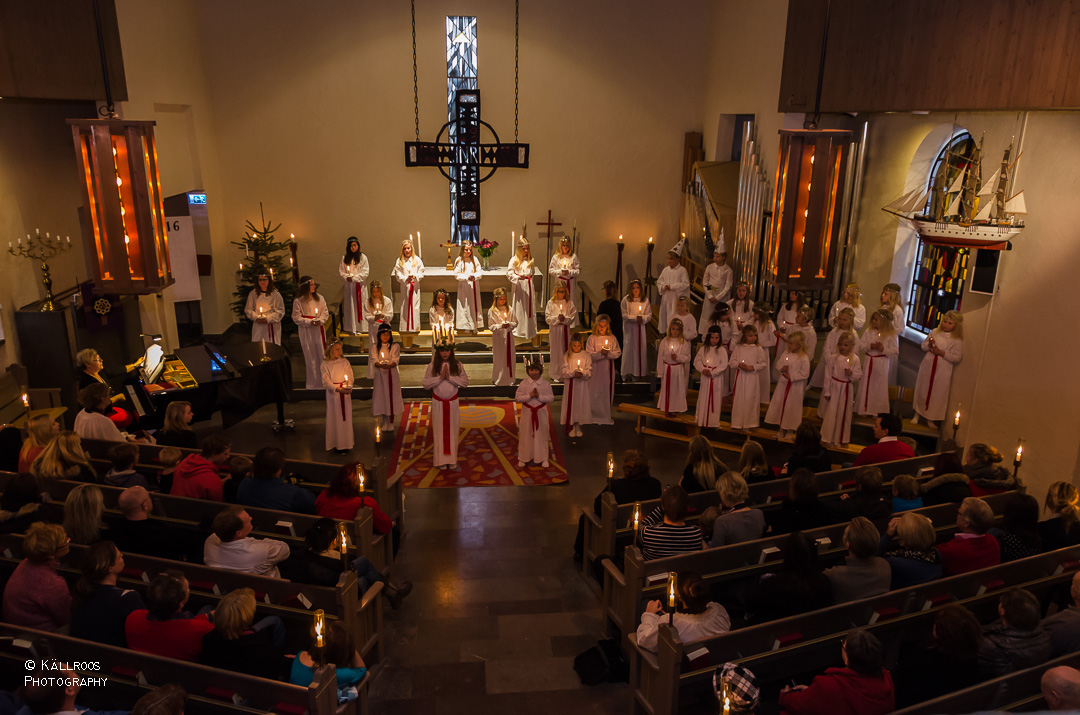
Saint Lucy's Day celebration in the church of Borgholm, Sweden 2012

Caroling is an integral part of today's Lucia procession, performing, e.g., Christmas song standards (Silent Night, Oh Christmas Tree) or the Scandinavian favorite "Nu är det jul igen" ("Now it is Christmas again"). (Note: For the star boys（stjärngossar), their standard repertoire includes the song Staffan Stalledräng (lit. 'Stephen the Stable Boy'), but this is more associated with the feast day of Saint Stephen, Christmas 26.) Among the lantern-carrying "star boys" (stjärngossar ) in the procession, it has become popular to have boys dressed up as a gingerbread man (Swedish: pepparkaksgubbe) (Note: Inspired by a popular song about 3 gingerbread men (Tre pepparkaksgubbar）according to Wall, the folklorist.) who are nominally supposed to be a tomte (elf) dressed up in this way. (Note: The tomte is associated more with Christmas, as the term Jultomte suggests. But the Advent, Lucia, and Jul ceremonies have become composite in Sweden.)

Traditionally, the Lucia girl would sing the song Lussibrud ("lit. 'Lucia bride'") to awaken members of the household.

The Swedish choir may sing traditional Neapolitan song Santa Lucia as part of the repertoire, and this underscores the view that Lussie was Santa Lucia from Naples, according to some opinion. (Note: The Swedish lyrics to the Neapolitan song Santa Lucia have traditionally been either Natten går tunga fjät (The Night steps heavily) or Sankta Lucia, ljusklara hägring (Saint Lucy, bright mirage). There is also a modern version with simpler lyrics for children: Ute är mörkt och kallt (Outside, it's dark and cold).)

Swedish (and other Scandinavian songs) sung by the Lucia procession have lyrics that tend to describe the light with which Lucia overcomes the darkness.

==== Lussi's night ====
As aforementioned, Lussi is the colloquial name for Lucia in Sweden. Lussinatta, the Lussi Night, was marked in Sweden as the night before St. Lucia's feast day on 13 December.

As for the Lussinata, superstition cautioned that naughty children could by abducted on this particular night (Lussi could come down through the chimney and take them away). In fact, the evil spirits out and about on this dangerous night could snatch away anyone careless enough to be outside, and even cause wreckages to homes.

Thus on Lussinata, in order to guard (home or) property from destruction by evil spirits, (Note: Besides the sinister Lucia spirit, another company of spirits was said to come riding through the night, though the time period was later, around Yule itself, journeying through the air, over land and water.) there developed the practice of keeping vigil through this night—theLussivaka. Despite the original sober intent, the Lussivaka eventually degenerated into a habit for drunken youths to dress up in ragged clothing and maraud the streets in throngs, or an excuse for students to have a night of partying, and the night became notorious for pranks. The drunkenness tradition for students held until about the 1990s, but the Day has declined during the last decades. The tradition may have had its roots in the Middle Ages of keeping vigil on the night before St. Lucy's Day.

If not a prank, one antic perpetrated by a well-off farmstead in Älvsborg County (Note: More specifically the Ving Church (congregation) (Vings församling) or perhaps parish (Vings socken).) was that a heifer or cow was dressed up with a chandelier between her horns, etc., to act as "Lucia", and was led around over a mile. (Note: Cf. also Miles (1913))

==== Interpretations ====
A sort of nature spirit interpretation is that Lussi was understood as a midwinter jul being, doling out punishment. Thus, storytelling on Lussi has constituted cautionary tales about the dangers of winter. There are other European nocturnal processions paralleling the Lussi procession, and the so-called Wild Hunt may be counted as one of them.

The candles perhaps symbolizes the fire that refused to take St. Lucy's life when she was sentenced to be burned, though a folklorist's verdict is that the underlying reason remains uncertain, though it has been tacitly assumed that the lit candle is somehow connected with Lucia's name denoting "light" (Latin: lux).

==== Social topics and issues ====
The Swedish St. Lucy's Day celebration has changed somewhat over time, but its main features are the same as at the beginning of the 20th century. A change during the last decades is that the celebration has taken on a more solemn atmosphere, alongside its popular atmosphere, and now the celebration also takes place in many churches, something that was unusual before the end of the 20th century.

The winner of the 1927 contest in Stockholm was a dark-haired girl, but over time, it became customary to choose a typical Swedish blonde.

Since 2008 there has been some controversy over males as Lucy, with one male who was elected Lucy at a high school being blocked from performing, and another performing together with a female. In another case a six-year-old boy was not allowed to appear with a Lucy crown because the school said it couldn't guarantee his safety. Conflicts over children of color portraying Saint Lucy have also become prevalent, such as when a company posted an advertisement in 2016 where a dark-skinned Swedish child portrayed Saint Lucy. (Note: This and an earliest instance when in 2012, a 14 year-old girl of color performed as STV television, resulting in vitriolic call-ins from viewers.)

As aforementioned, the tradition of Lussevaka – to stay awake through the Lussinatt to guard oneself and the household against evil, has found a modern form through throwing parties until daybreak.

The procession in Ericsson Globe in Stockholm holds the Guinness World Records distinction of being the largest in the world, with 1200 participants from Adolf Fredrik's Music School, Stockholms Musikgymnasium and Stockholmläns Blåsarsymfoniker.

==== Sámi ====
It has become common for those populations of Indigenous Sámi that live in districts where the Lucia Day is celebrated to also have such celebrations. While the Sámi Lucia beaivi events follow the mainly secular spirit of the Nordic majority cultures' Lucia celebrations, the lyrics to the Sámi version of the Neapolitan song are more markedly religious, focusing on the life story of Lucia the martyr. Excerpt: "Guhkkin Sicilias / dolin lei nieida / Dan nieidda namma lei / Sáŋta Lucia." ("In faraway Sicily / long ago was a girl / The name of that girl was / Saint Lucy."). The lyrics are also notable in that the words "Sicilia" and "Lucia" do not follow usual Sámi orthography, as when written like this they should be pronounced "Sitsilia" and "Lutsia" but are sung as "Sisilia" and "Lusia".

=== Denmark ===
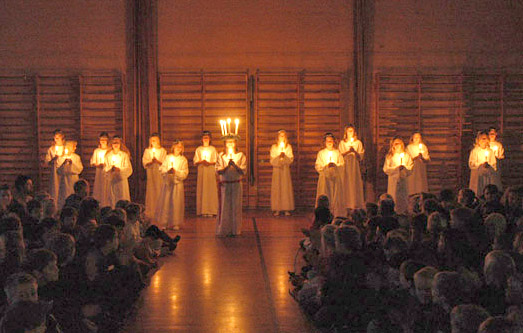
Danish girls in the Lucia procession at a Helsingør public school, 2001

In Denmark, the Day of Lucy (Luciadag) was first celebrated in 1944, at the National Scala amusement facility in Copenhagen. The tradition was directly imported from Sweden under the initiative of the head (Note: Franz Wend, secretary.) of Föreningen Norden (Denmark's association for Nordic cooperation), who felt that the Swedish candle-lit tradition should "spread light" to Denmark during the bleakness of World War II.

Although the tradition is imported from Sweden, it differs somewhat in that the church celebration has always been strongly centered on Christianity and it is a yearly local event in most churches in conjunction with Christmas. Schools and kindergartens also use the occasion to mark the event as a special day for children on one of the final days before the Christmas holidays, but it does not have much impact anywhere else in society.

There are also a number of additional historical traditions connected with the celebration, which are not widely observed. The night before candles are lit and all electrical lights are turned off, and on the Sunday closest to 13 December Danes traditionally attend church.

The traditional Danish version of the Neapolitan song is not especially Christian in nature, the only Christian concept being "Sankta Lucia". Excerpt: "Nu bæres lyset frem | stolt på din krone. | Rundt om i hus og hjem | sangen skal tone." ("The light's carried forward | proudly on your crown. | Around in house and home | The song shall sound now.")

The Christian version used in churches is Sankta Lucia from 1982, by priest Holger Lissner.

Saint Lucy's Day is celebrated also in the Faroe Islands.

=== Norway ===
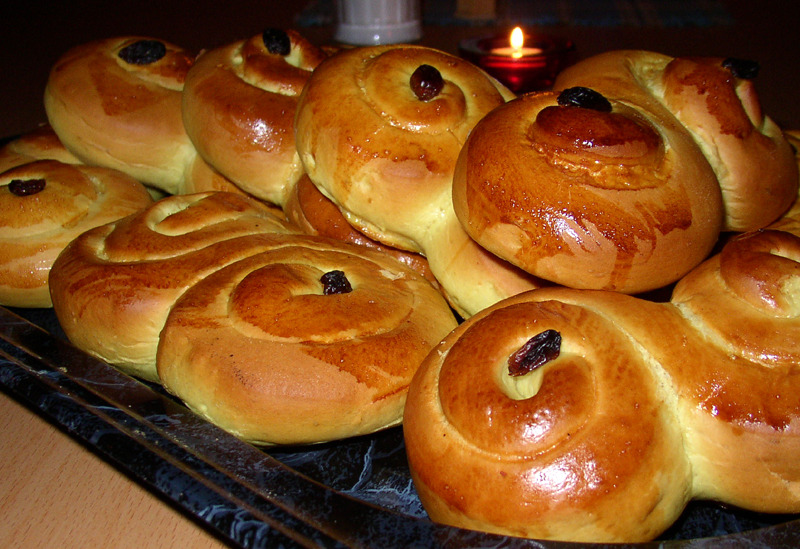
Lucia buns, made with saffron

Historically Norwegians considered what they called Lussinatten the longest night of the year and no work was to be done. From that night until Christmas, spirits, gnomes and trolls roamed the earth. Lussi, a feared enchantress, punished anyone who dared work. Legend also has it that farm animals talked to each other on Lussinatten, and that they were given additional feed on this longest night of the year. The Lussinatt, the night of 13 December, was largely forgotten in Norway at the beginning of the 20th century, though still remembered as an ominous night, and also celebrated in some areas, especially in Mid, Central and Eastern inland.

It was not until after World War II that the modern celebration of Lucia in Norway became adopted on a larger scale. It is now again observed all over the country.

Like the Swedish tradition, and unlike the Danish, Lucy is largely a secular event in Norway, and is observed in kindergartens and schools (often through secondary level). However, it has in recent years also been incorporated in the Advent liturgy in the Church of Norway. The boys are often incorporated in the procession, staging as magi with tall hats and star-staffs. Occasionally, anthems of Saint Stephen are taken in on behalf of the boys.

For the traditional observance of the day, school children form processions through the hallways of the school building carrying candles, and hand out lussekatt buns. While rarely observed at home, parents often take time off work to watch these school processions in the morning, and if their child should be chosen to be Lucia, it is considered a great honor. Later on in the day, the procession usually visits local retirement homes, hospitals, and nursing homes.

The traditional Norwegian version of the Neapolitan song is, just like the Danish, not especially Christian in nature, the only Christian concept being "Sankta Lucia". Excerpt: "Svart senker natten seg / i stall og stue. / Solen har gått sin vei / skyggene truer." ("Darkly the night descends / in stable and cottage. / The sun has gone away / the shadows loom.")

=== Finland ===
The Finnish celebrations have been historically tied to Swedish culture and the Swedish-speaking Finns. They observe "Luciadagen" a week before the Winter Solstice. St Lucy is celebrated as a "beacon of brightness" in the darkest time of year. The first records of St. Lucy celebrations in Finland are from 1898, and the first large celebrations came in 1930, a couple of years after the popularization of the celebrations in Sweden. The St. Lucy of Finland has been elected since 1949 and she is crowned in the Helsinki Cathedral. Local St. Lucies are elected in almost every place where there is a Swedish populace in Finland. The Finnish-speaking population has also lately begun to embrace the celebrations.

In 2024, Daniela Owusu, a Finnish Ghanaian woman became Finland's first Black Lucia, sparking racist abuse and tens of thousands of hate messages on social media.

=== United States ===
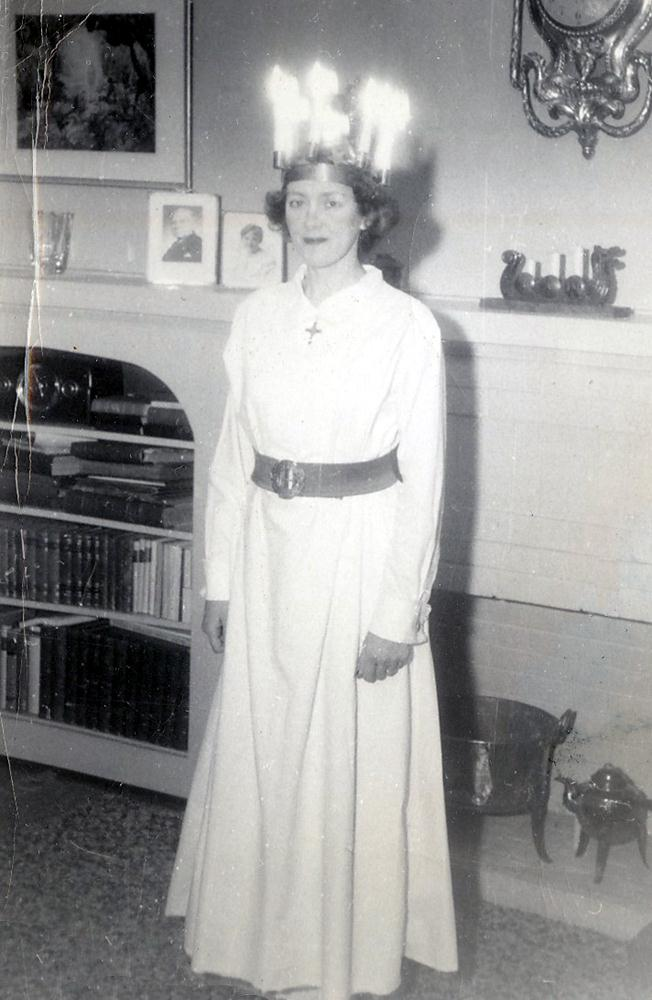
Birgit Ridderstedt dressed to perform as St. Lucy in Chicago in 1951

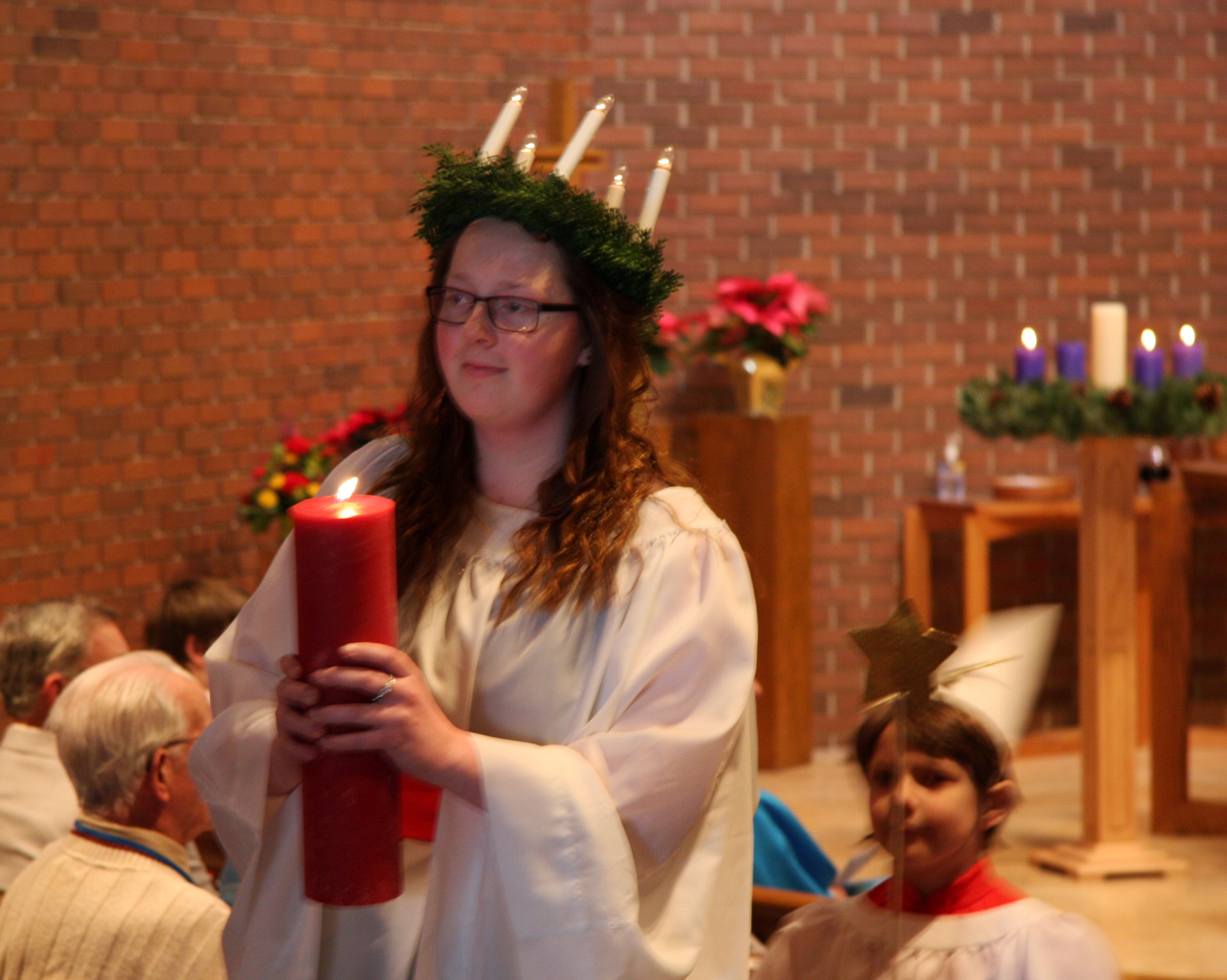
Saint Lucy procession inside a Swedish-American Lutheran church in Rochester, Minnesota

The celebration of St. Lucy's Day is popular among Scandinavian Americans, and is practiced in many different contexts, including (but not limited to) parties, at home, in churches, and through organizations across the country. Continuing to uphold this ritual helps people keep ties with the Scandinavian countries.

In the Evangelical Lutheran Church in America (ELCA), which is the successor denomination to hundreds of Scandinavian and German Lutheran congregations, St. Lucy is treated as a commemoration on 13 December, in which red vestments are worn. Usually, the Sunday in Advent closest to 13 December is set aside for St. Lucy, in which the traditional Scandinavian procession is observed.

The public St. Lucy celebration in Lindsborg, Kansas, is a way to display the town's Swedish heritage, and serves as a rallying point for the community. It also brings visitors to the town, which benefits the town financially.

Since 1979, Hutto, Texas, has held a St. Lucy celebration for their town at the Lutheran church. Every year a Lucy is picked from the congregation. The procession then walks around the church, sings the traditional St. Lucy song, and serves the traditional saffron buns and ginger cookies.

Gustavus Adolphus College, as a school founded by Swedish immigrants, has celebrated the Festival of Saint Lucy annually since 1941. Six sophomore women are chosen to be a part of the Court of St. Lucy. The women are chosen by their peers honoring the qualities of the legendary Lucy. In an effort to keep the tradition relevant to today, the selection process changed in 2011 was modified. First, the campus community is invited to submit nominations of any sophomore woman who exemplifies the qualities of courageous leadership, service to others, strength of character, and compassion and therefore is a light to others. These women do not have to have a Swedish connection or the ability to sing (since the court goes caroling in the early morning). Sophomore women then vote who should be on the court. The highest three nominees are included. Then the Guild of St. Lucy, a senior honors society, reviews the remaining nominations and selects up to three more women to serve on the court with the goal of having the court be representative of the sophomore class.

=== Germany and Austria ===
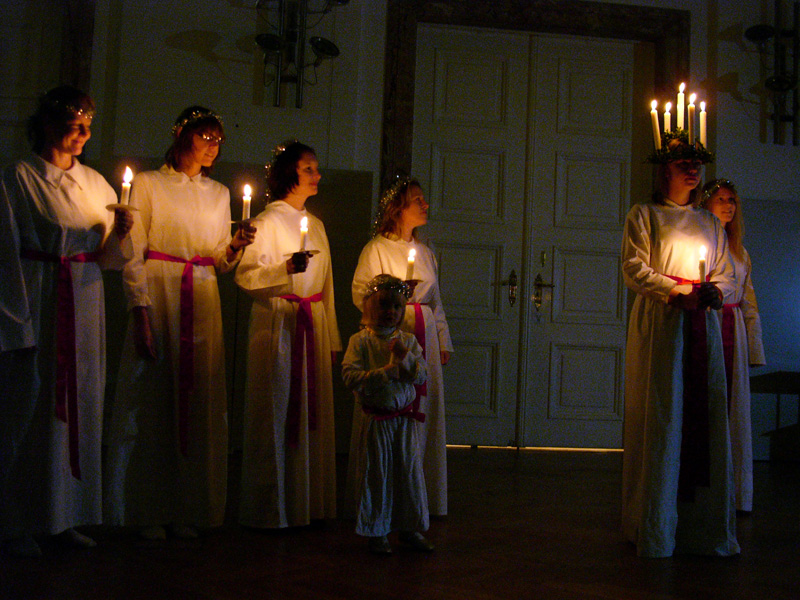
Lucias singing. Vienna

=== Croatia and Hungary ===
In Croatia, Hungary and some of their neighbouring countries, a popular tradition on Saint Lucy's Day involves planting wheat grains; nowadays this serves as symbol of the new life born in Bethlehem, with a candle sometimes placed in the middle of the new plant as a symbol of the Light of Christ that Saint Lucia brings. Wheat grains are planted in a round dish or plate of soil, and then watered. If the planter is kept moist, the seeds germinate and the shoots are ideally several inches high by Christmas. The new green shoots, reminding us of the new life born in Bethlehem, may be tied with a ribbon and put near or under the Christmas tree. The real reason wheat was and is planted at this time, or on 4 December, the Day of Saint Barbara, is because the density, color and richness of the shoots will foretell how the upcoming yield will be, as well as increase the chances of it being a good one. In Hungary, the Luca széke (Lucy's chair) tradition teaches that one must start crafting a stool or chair on St. Lucy's Day, doing one piece per day and finishing by Christmas Eve. On that night, when one stands on the finished stool or chair one will be able to see who is a witch.

In the region of Dalmatia, Saint Lucy brings gifts to children on 13 December. This is a tradition derived from Venice.

=== Spain ===
The town of Mollerussa since 1963 holds a contest of paper clothing around this day. Saint Lucy is considered the patron saint of dressmakers, who showed their talent making elaborate dresses out of paper.

=== Malta ===
Santa Luċija is the patron saint of the villages of Mtarfa (Malta) and Santa Luċija, Gozo. On 13 December Malta also celebrates Republic Day.

=== Saint Lucia (Caribbean) ===
In Saint Lucia, a small island nation in the Caribbean named after its patron saint, St. Lucy, 13 December is celebrated as National Day. The National Festival of Lights and Renewal is held the night before the holiday, in honour of St. Lucy of Syracuse the saint of light. In this celebration, decorative lights (mostly bearing a Christmas theme) are lit in the capital city of Castries; artisans present decorated lanterns for competition; and the official activities end with a fireworks display. In the past, a jour ouvert celebration has continued into the sunrise of 13 December.

=== Venezuela ===
The town of Mucuchíes in Mérida state, Venezuela, has chosen as their patron saints St. Lucy and St. Benedict the Moor. Patron saint festivities are held during the month of December.
