= Cyrillus Johansson =

Swedish architect (1884–1959)

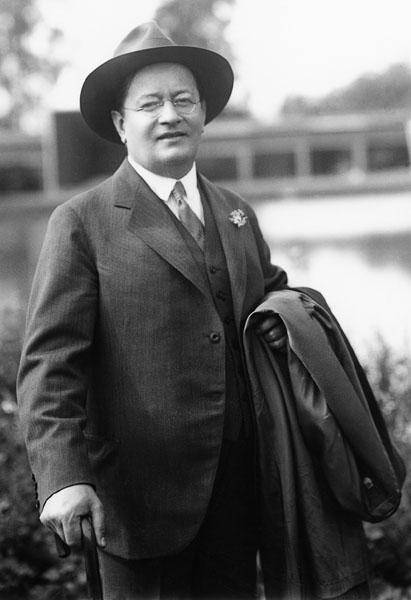
Cyrillus Johansson

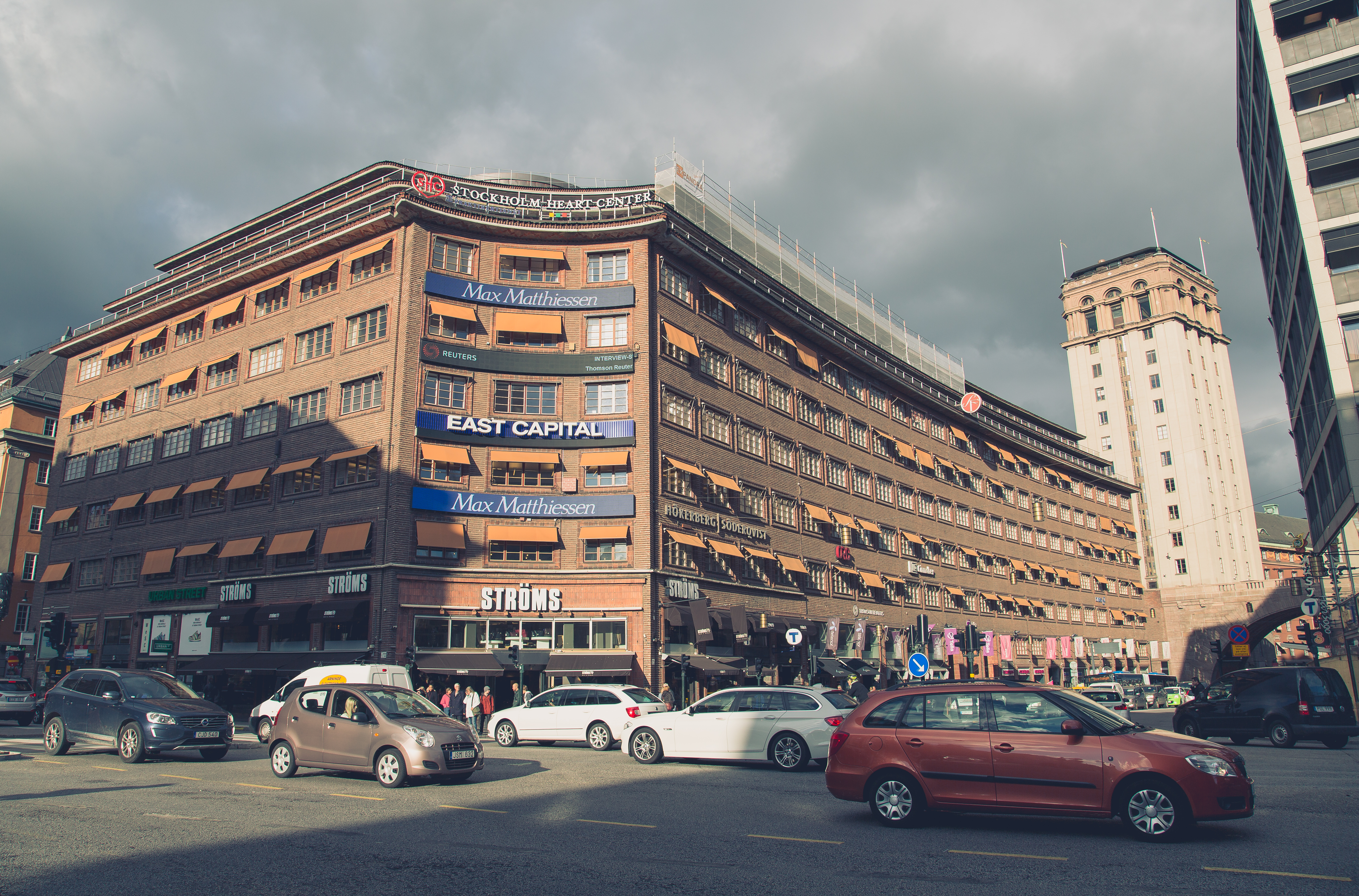
Centrumhuset in Stockholm

Cyrillus Johansson (9 July 1884, in Gävle – 20 May 1959, in Lidingö) was a Swedish architect.

== Life and work ==
Laurentius Cyrillus Johansson was born in Gävle, Sweden. He was the son of Magnus Johansson and Johanna Charlotta Bohlin His father worked as a stonemason. He studied architecture at Chalmers University of Technology in Gothenburg and graduated in 1908. After his studies he moved to Stockholm to pursue his career as an architect.

Although productive as an architect already during the 1910s, he became renowned through his design for the main storage building for the liquor company Vin & Sprit, built 1920–24. This building effectively established Cyrillus Johansson as one of the most influential architects in Sweden during the 1920s, and he became one of the most prolific representatives of the so-called Nordic Classicism-movement. Other notable works from this period include the Museum of Värmland in Karlstad, a large office complex in central Stockholm (Swedish: Centrumhuset) and two large villas in Diplomatstaden in Stockholm.

Following the Stockholm Exhibition in 1930 and the advent of Functionalism, Cyrillus Johansson's aesthetic language fell out of favour with the broad architectural community in Sweden. Johansson himself considered the new ideas "a personal affront" and continued to pursue his personal architectural ideals. In the 1940s, as the functionalistic doctrines were softened somewhat and an economic crisis caused by the ongoing World War II prompted a revival for building in cheaper brick, arguably Johanssons favourite material, he experienced something of a comeback and was among other things commissioned with designing buildings for the Military Archives of Sweden and other military offices in Gärdet, Stockholm. He also designed the Fagersta airspace surveillance tower. During the 1950s, he was mainly engaged in church building (e.g., the church in Björneborg) and restoration.

== Style ==
Cyrillus Johansson preferred to work with brick, inspired to some extent by German Brick Expressionism, and to some extent by National Romanticism. As mentioned above, he also became a practitioner of what has been labelled Nordic Classicism in the 1920s, although he relied on historical references to earlier Swedish architecture to a perhaps greater extent than to continental Classical architecture. Strong influences from Japanese and Chinese Architecture together with various personal forms of expressions however often add a distinct character to his buildings.

In addition to highly prestigious commissions such as grand villas and office complexes, Johansson also worked with Industrial architecture and the like, providing designs also for bridges, water towers and factories, among other things.

=== Gallery ===
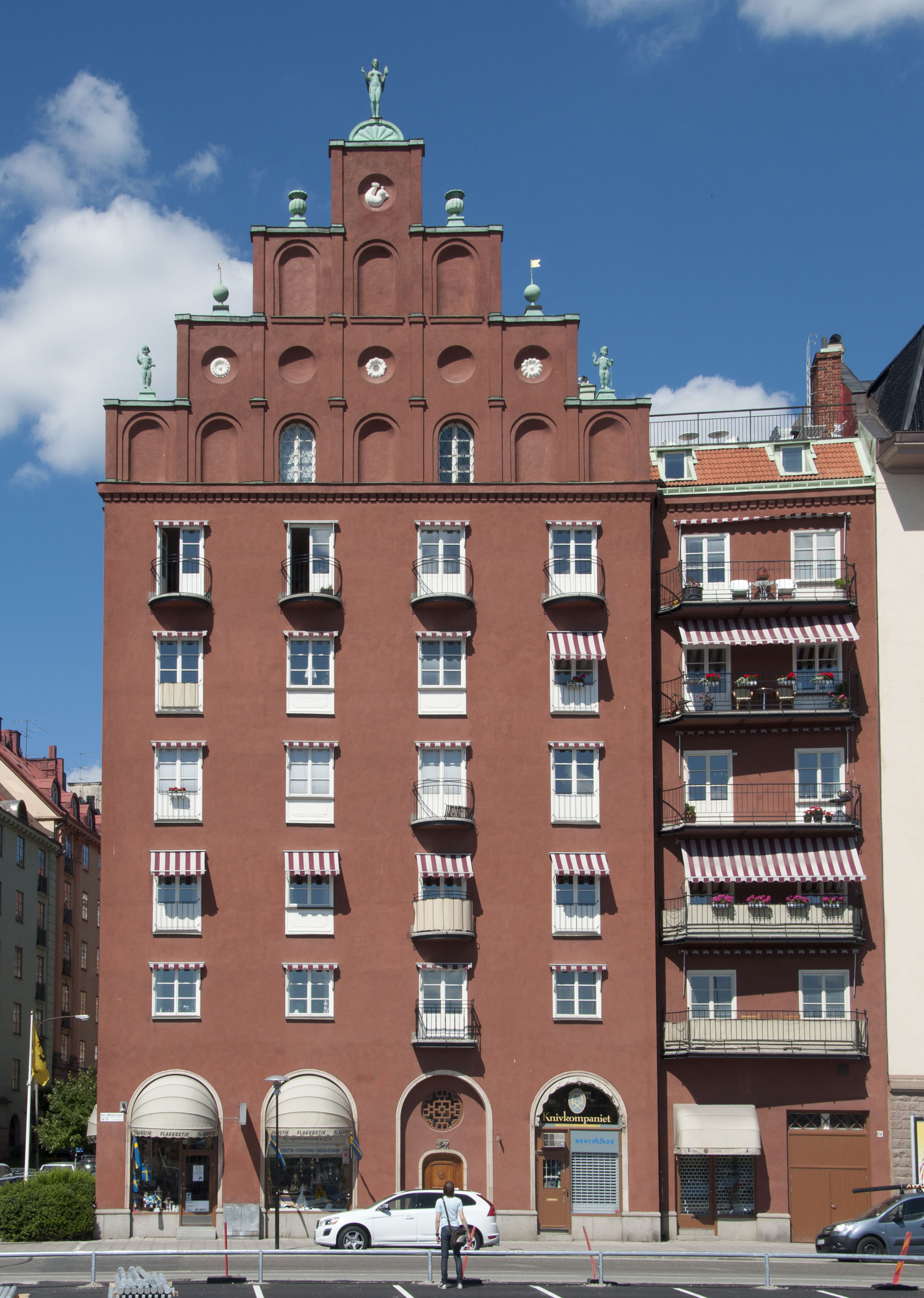
Residential house in Stockholm, 1923–24

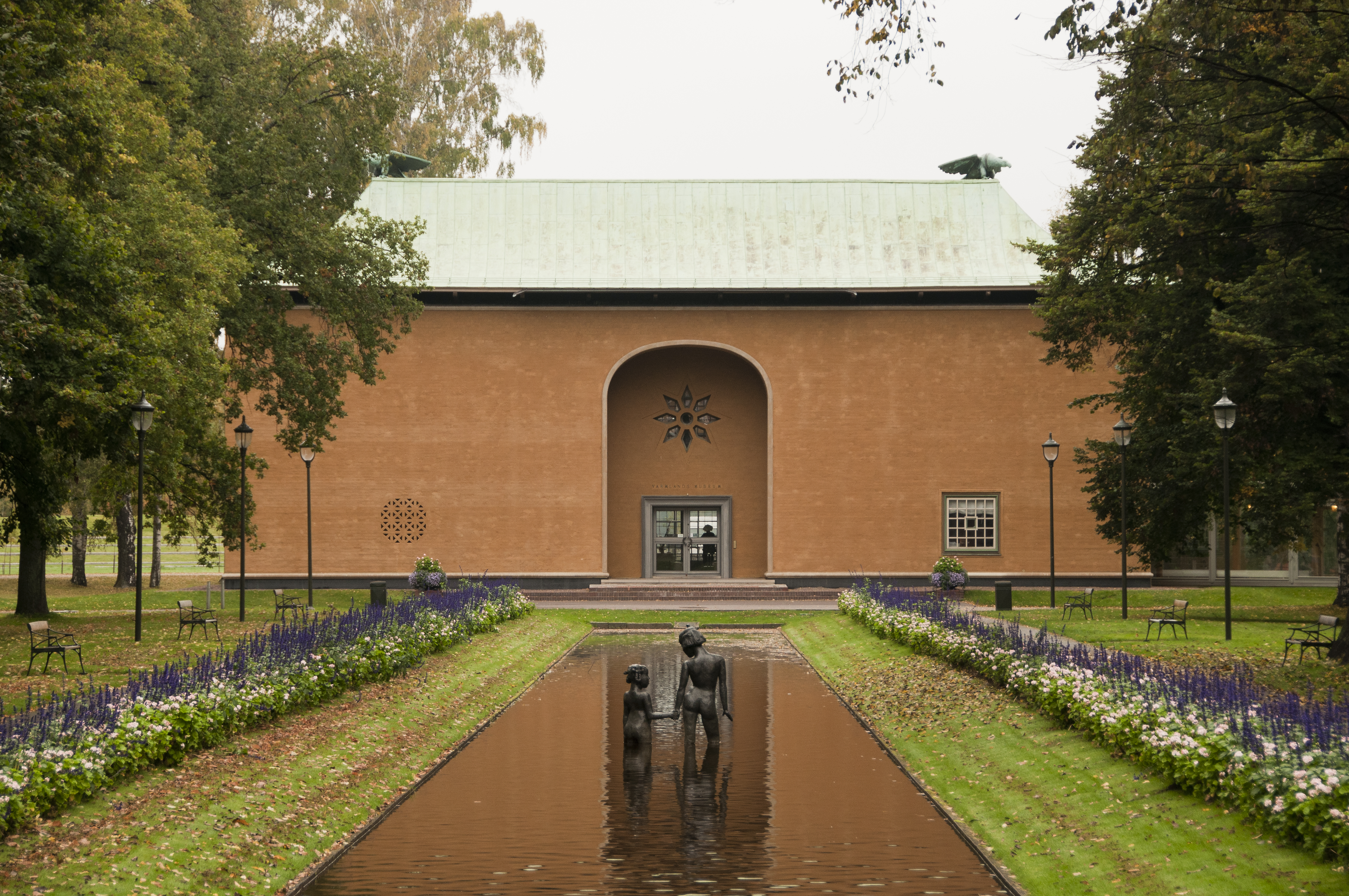
Museum of Värmland (Swedish: Värmlands museum}), Karlstad, 1929

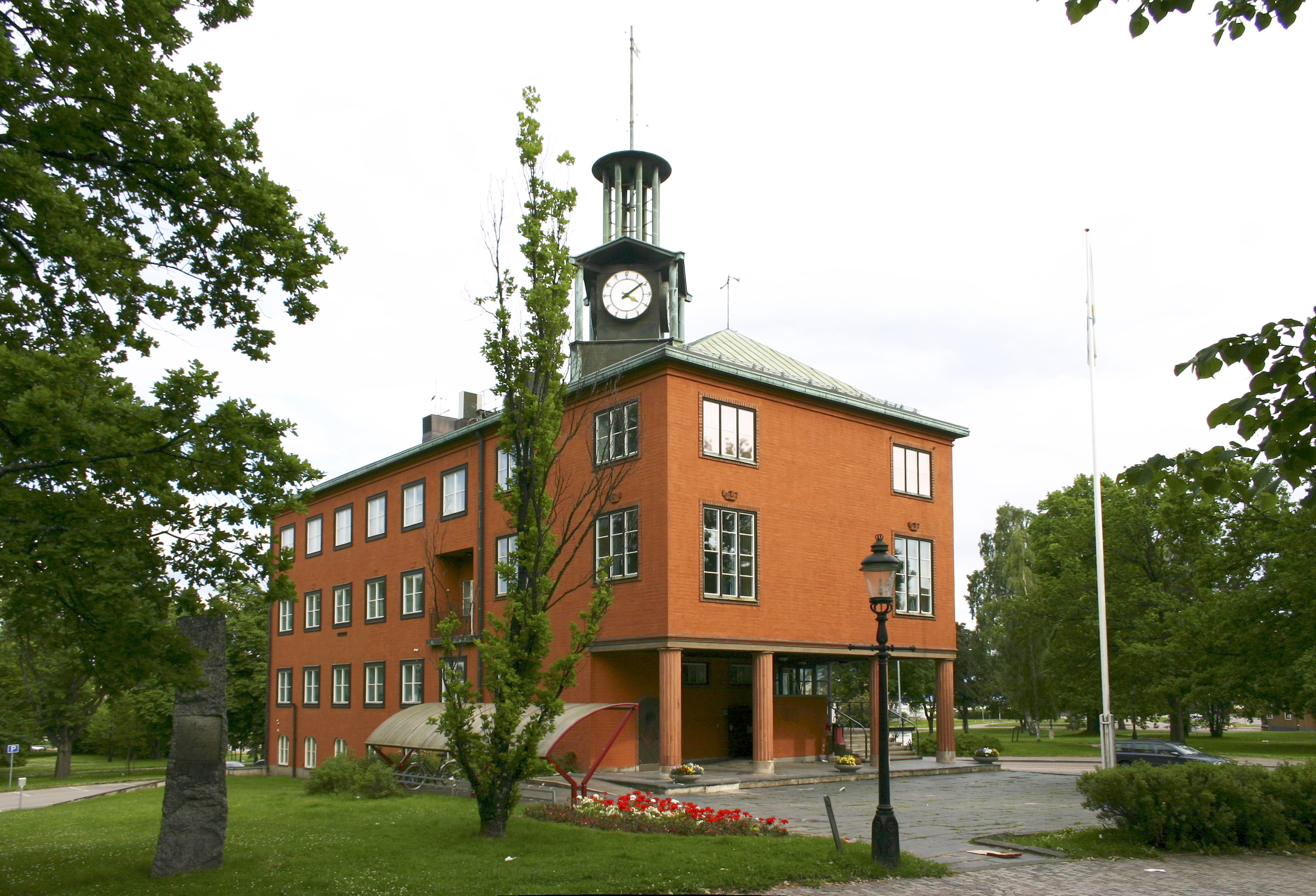
Ludvika Town Hall, Ludvika, 1936–38

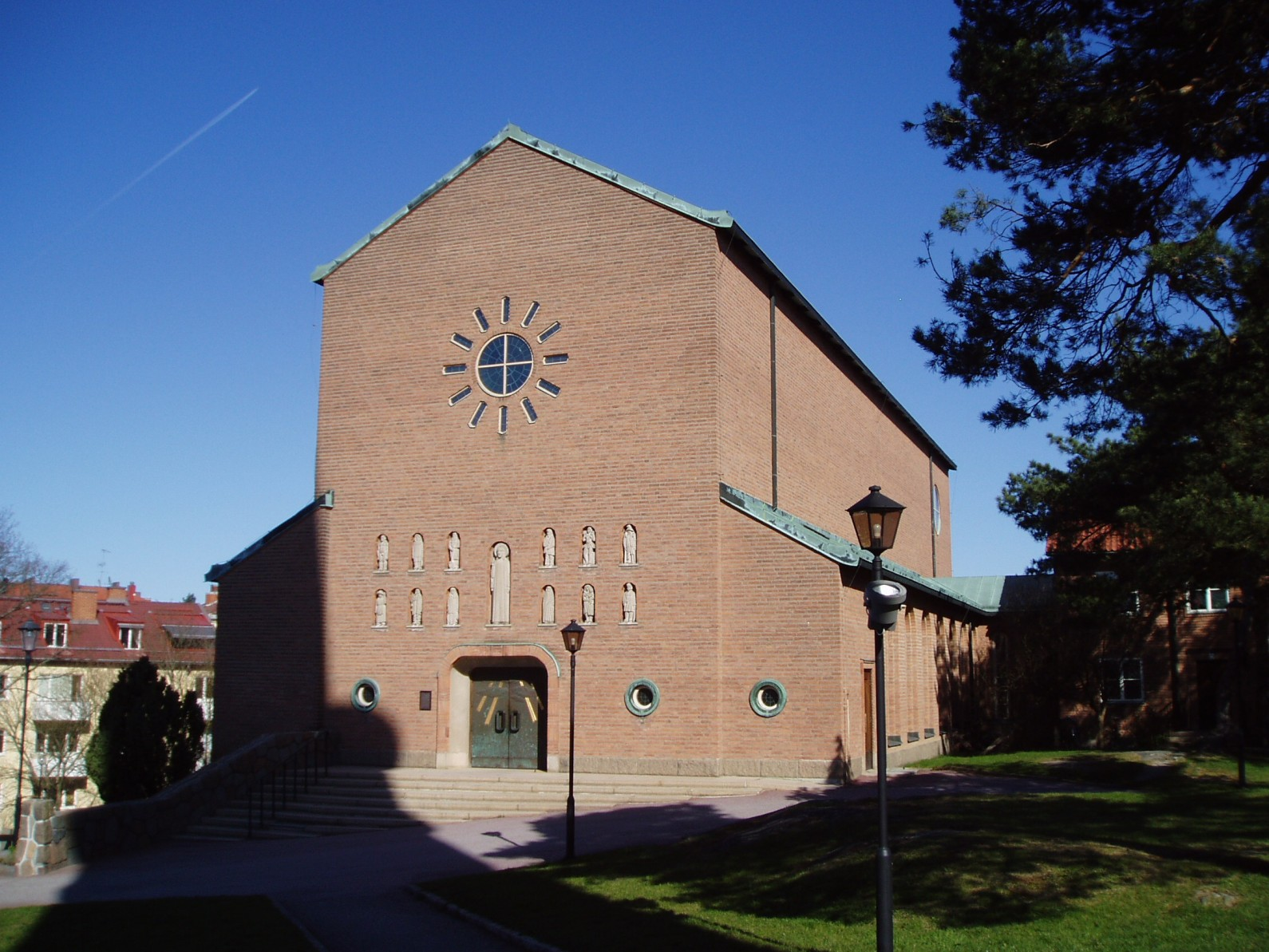
Church on Stora Essingen, Stockholm, 1959
