= Diplomatstaden =

Area in Östermalm, Stockholm, Sweden

Coordinates: 59°19′59″N 18°06′10″E

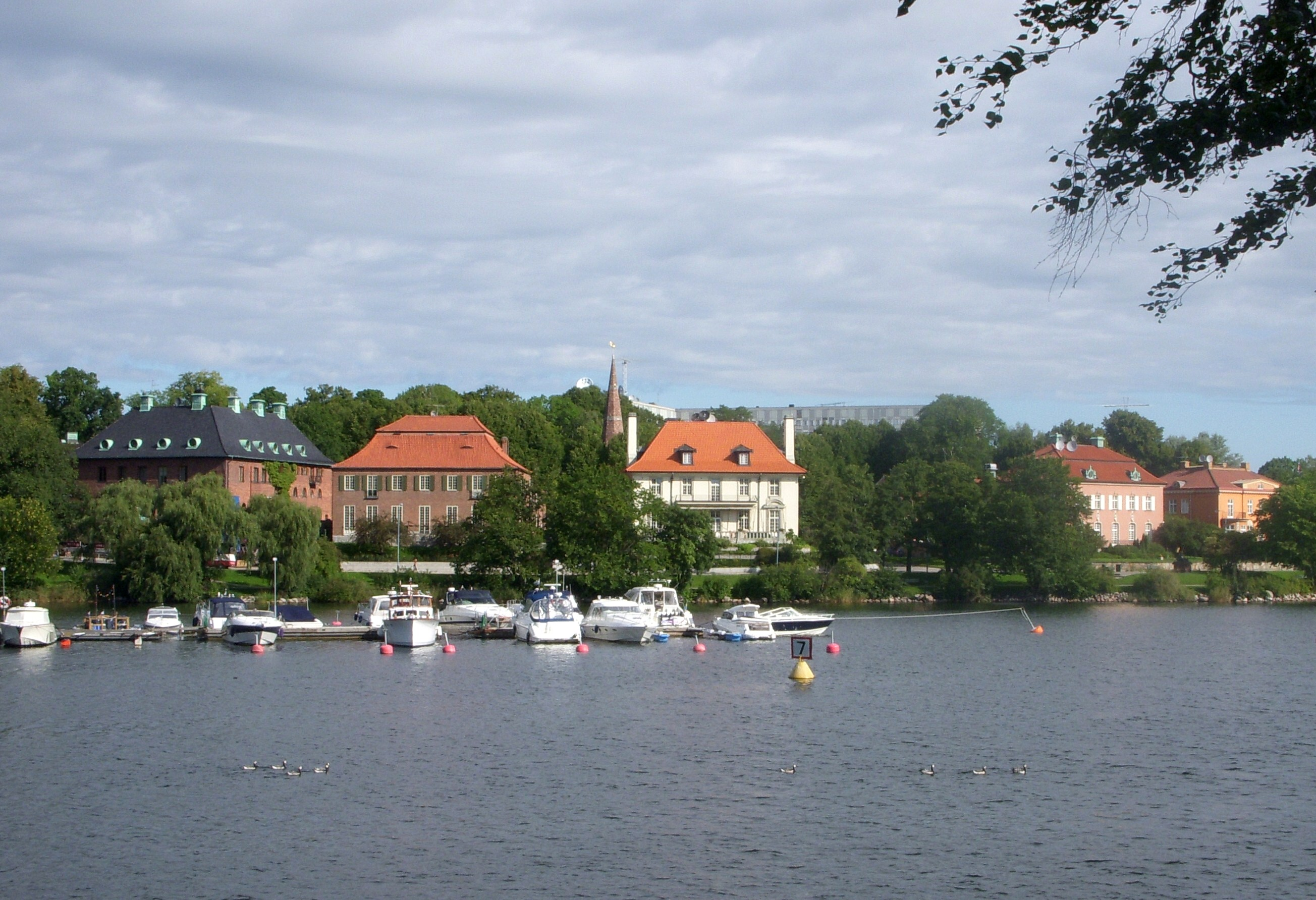
Diplomatstaden, view from Djurgården, August 2008.

Diplomatstaden (Swedish for "Diplomat City") is a neighbourhood in the Östermalm district in central Stockholm, Sweden. As the name suggests, the neighbourhood is the home of many embassies and ambassadorial residencies.

Diplomatstaden encompasses the area facing the Djurgårdsbrunnsviken bay which is located south of the easternmost part of Strandvägen. It is an exclusive residential area composed of a group of brick villas built mostly in the 1910s and 1920s.

== History ==
The municipal council had scrapped its plans for a Nobel institute in the neighbouring Nobel Park (Nobelparken) in 1906. Instead, city planning authority Per Olof Hallman designed a city plan for the area in 1911 and 1914. His plan strictly specified what materials should be used and detailed much of the exterior shapes of the buildings. Additionally, the irregularly shaped sites, over time increasingly criticised by involved architects, strongly dictated the design of the buildings. Most buildings facing the street passing north of the area are surrounded by walls, while open gardens surround those facing the southern waterfront.

Hallman placed the villas in a semicircle around St Peter and St Sigfrid's Church, known locally as the "English Church" (Engelska kyrkan). Designed by James Souttar in 1863, the church was originally located at Wallingatan north of the Norra Bantorget square, but was moved brick by brick to its present location in 1913. The first villa to be built was banker Philip Geber's (5, Nobelgatan), designed by Ragnar Östberg in 1913. Two years later, United Kingdom had their embassy built (7, Nobelgatan) to the design of British architect Sir Richard Allison.

== Villas ==
The villas in the area are:

Property	Address	Year	Architect	Initial owner	Current owner (2008)
Villa Geber	Nobelgatan 5	1913	Ragnar Östberg	Philip Geber	Salvatore Grimaldi
Tryggerska villan	Nobelgatan 3	1914	Ivar Tengbom	Ernst Trygger	Swedish Bar Association
Brittiska residenset	Nobelgatan 7	1915	Richard Allison	United Kingdom	United Kingdom
Bünsowska villan	Nobelgatan 15	1919	Carl Westman	Robert Bünsow	Saudi Arabia
Tillbergska villan	Nobelgatan 9	1919	Ivar Tengbom	Knut Tillberg	South Korea
Villa Gumælius	Nobelgatan 1	1924	Erik Trana	A. S:son Gumælius	Hungary
Villa Bonde	Dag Hammarskjölds väg 20	1925	Cyrillus Johansson	Nils Gustaf Bonde	Turkey
Villa Wikström	Dag Hammarskjölds väg 22	1925	Cyrillus Johansson	Carl Wikström	South Korea
Villa Josephson	Nobelgatan 11	1926	Erik Josephson	John Josephson	Belgium
Villa Bonnier	Nobelgatan 13	1927	Ragnar Östberg	Åke Bonnier	Sweden
Villa Hjorth	Dag Hammarskjölds väg 26	1930	Curt Björklund	Berndt August Hjorth	Turkey
Villa Åkerlund	Nobelgatan 2	1932	Knut Peterson	Erik Åkerlund	United States
