= Fagersta airspace surveillance tower =

Airspace surveillance tower in Sweden

Coordinates: 60°00′37.2″N 15°48′07.2″E

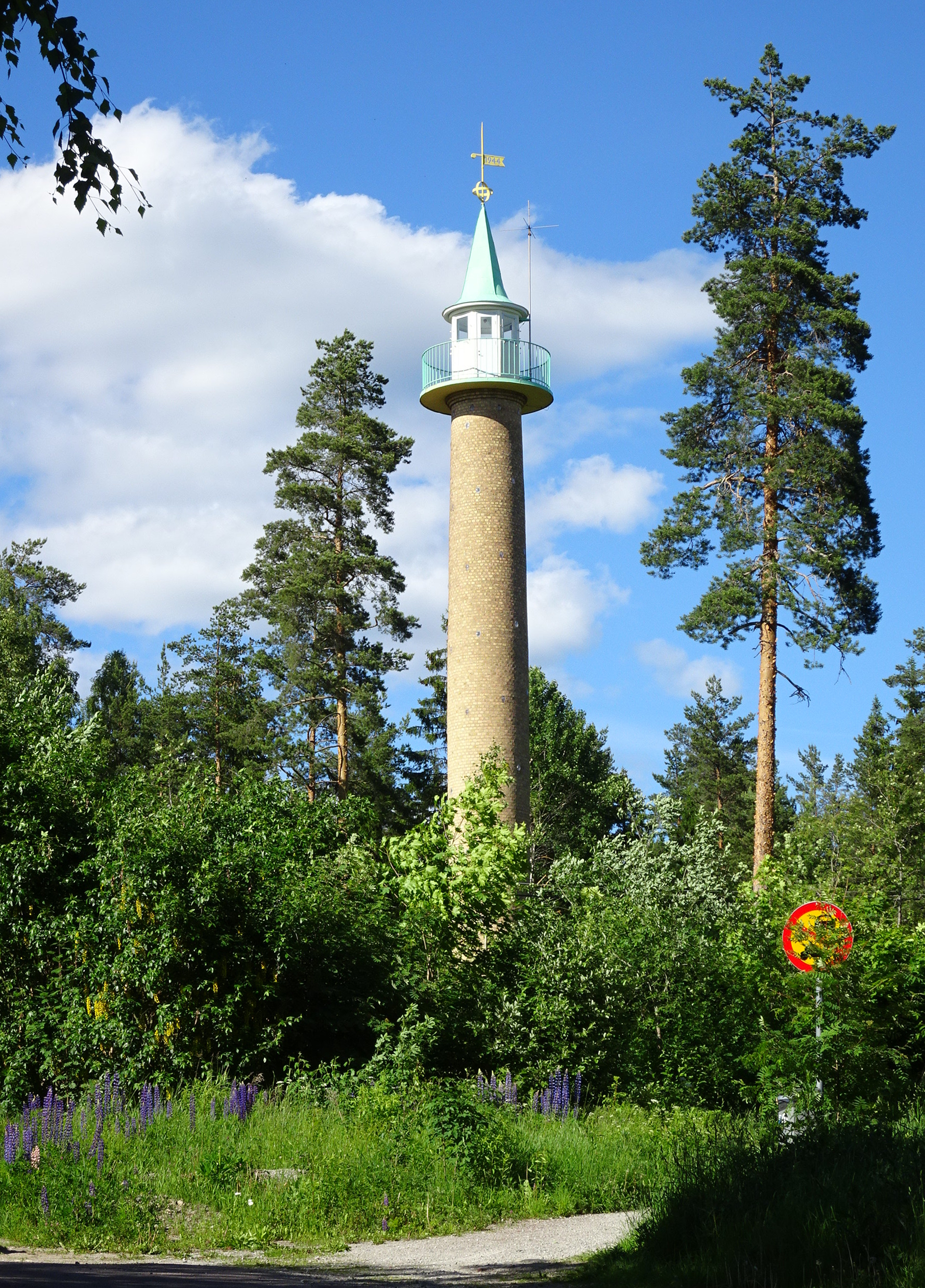
Fagersta airspace surveillance tower

Fagersta airspace surveillance tower (Swedish: Fagersta luftbevakningstorn) is an airspace surveillance tower in Fagersta, Västmanland County, Sweden. Designed by Cyrillus Johansson, it is the only architect designed airspace surveillance tower in Sweden dating from World War II and one of only a few such towers to remain intact. It was designated a listed building in 2013.

== History ==
During World War II, the steel mill company Fagersta Bruk AB (no longer in existence) was an important supplier of munitions and weapons for the Swedish Armed Forces. Among other things, the steel mill provided the military with shells for grenades and barrels for rifles. While Sweden remained directly unaffected by the war, the country maintained a high degree of military readiness. In order to be able to defend the steel mill in the event of an attack on Sweden, anti-aircraft guns were placed by the military around strategic industrial sites. The company owning the steel mill in 1943 took the initiative to build the tower, from which the fire of the anti-aircraft guns could be directed. The tower was finished in 1944, but saw no use in its intended capacity, since the war ended within a year of its construction, and the neutrality of Sweden was not violated during that time.

Fagersta Municipality considered tearing the tower down at one point, but after funding had been secured for its restoration (funding provided to a large part by the County administrative board) the building was restored. Since 2013, it is a listed building, meaning it is protected by law against destruction or alteration.

During World War II, approximately 1,200 airspace surveillance towers were built in Sweden, most of them wooden. Only a few remain preserved, and the tower in Fagersta is unique in that it was designed by an architect. The use of expensive building materials is also unusual. It is also the only such tower that Cyrillus Johansson designed.

== Design ==
Fagersta Bruk AB contracted architect Cyrillus Johansson to design the tower. He had previously designed other buildings for the company, as well as other buildings in Fagersta. The tower is constructed out of yellow brick, and a spiral stair runs inside the tower. Small windows give daylight to the stairwell. The tower ends in a platform surmounted by an octagonal pavilion with a small spire and a weather vane. A small adjacent building was designed to function as a small office and bomb shelter. It has been noted that the design displays influences from oriental architecture, and it has been compared to both a minaret and the tower of a medieval or fairy tale castle. The tower is 26 metres (85 ft) tall.
