= Saffron bun =

Sweet bun flavoured with saffron

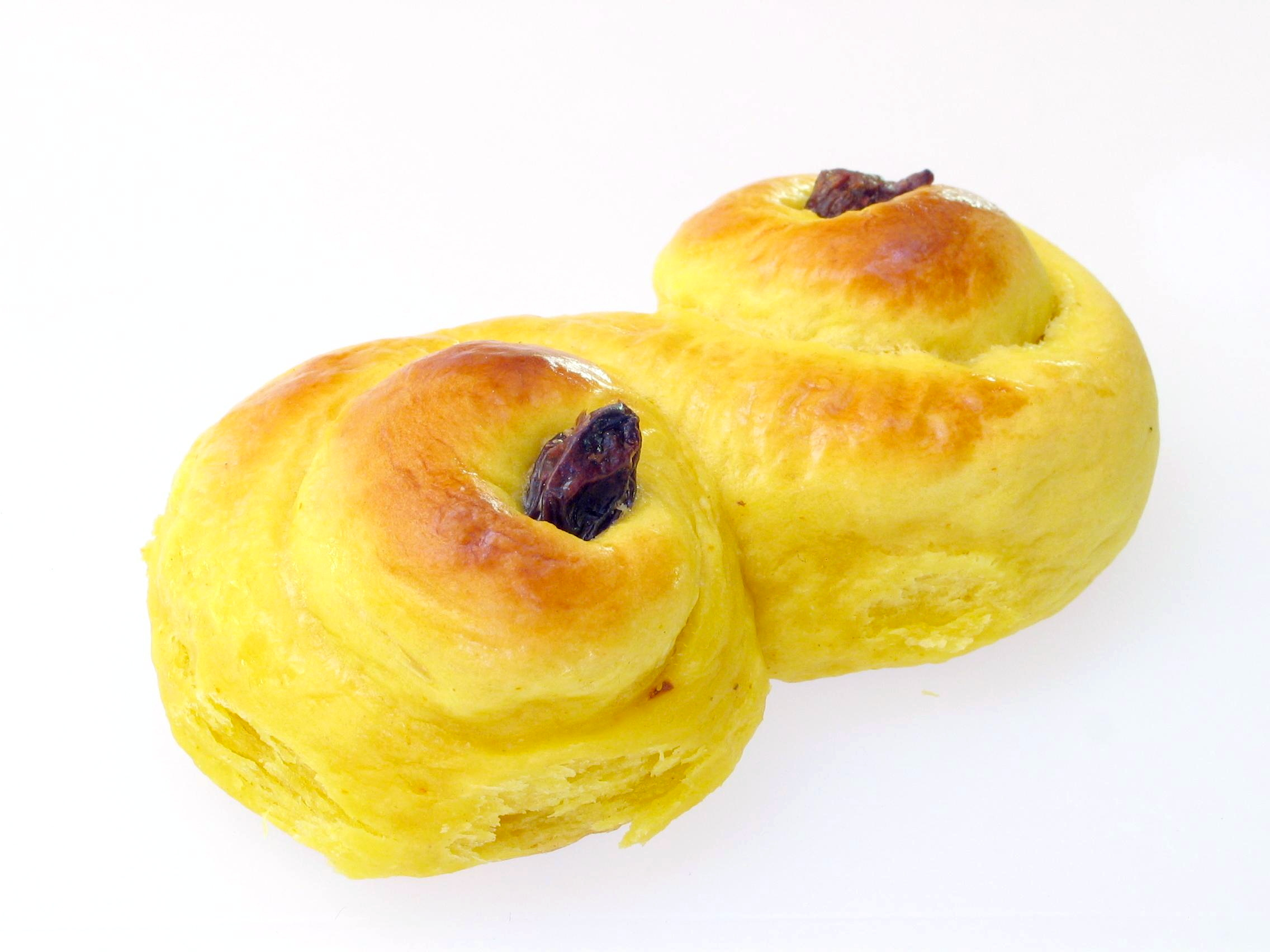
- Alternative names: Saffron cake, saffron loaf, tea treat bun, St Lucia bun, lussebulle, lussekatt
- Type: Sweet roll or yeasted cake
- Place of origin: Cornwall, Norway, Sweden
- Main ingredients: currants or raisins, saffron, cinnamon or nutmeg

A saffron bun, Cornish tea treat bun or revel bun is a rich, spiced yeast-leavened sweet bun that is flavoured with saffron and contains dried fruit including currants and raisins similar to a teacake. The main ingredients are plain flour, butter, yeast, caster sugar, currants and sultanas. Larger versions baked in a loaf tin are known as saffron cake.

Similar buns are Swedish lussebulle or lussekatt and Norwegian lussekatt.

== West Country ==
The "revel bun" from Cornwall is baked for special occasions, such as anniversary feasts (revels), or the dedication of a church. Saffron was historically grown in the mild climate of Devon and Cornwall but it is likely that saffron from Spain had been traded for centuries before. In the West of Cornwall, large saffron buns are also known as "tea treat buns" and are associated with Methodist Sunday school outings or activities. In parts of Britain, the buns were traditionally baked on sycamore leaves and dusted with powdered sugar.

== Scandinavian St Lucia bun ==
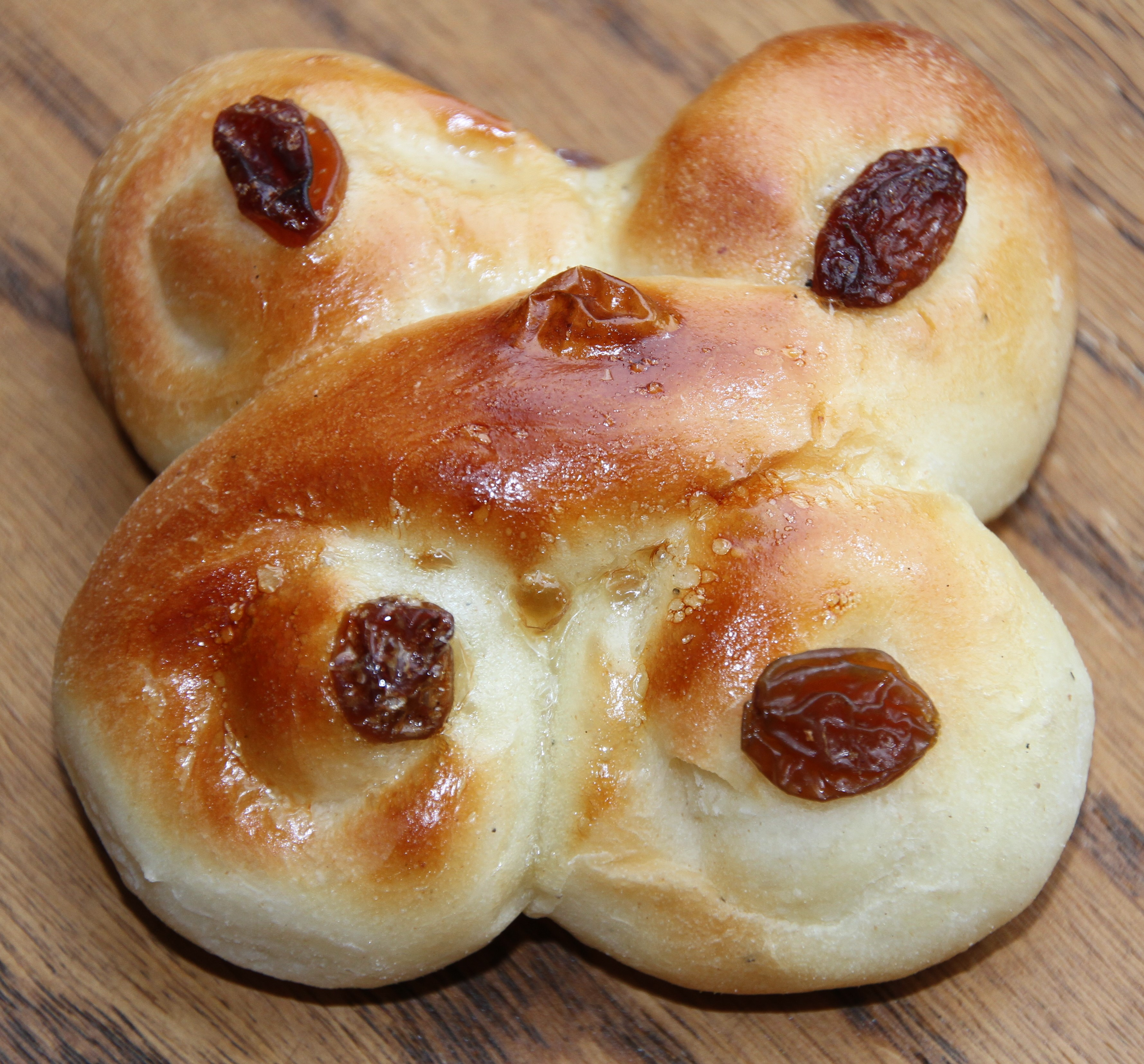
Swedish lussekatt or Lucia bun

In Sweden and Norway, no cinnamon or nutmeg is used in the bun, and raisins are used instead of currants. The buns are baked into many traditional shapes, of which the simplest is a reversed S-shape. They have traditional religious symbolism and are eaten during Advent, and especially on Saint Lucy's Day, 13 December. In addition to Sweden, they are also prepared and eaten in much the same way in Finland, particularly in Swedish-speaking areas, and by Swedish-speaking Finns, as well as in Norway and less commonly in Denmark.

== Saffron colouring ==
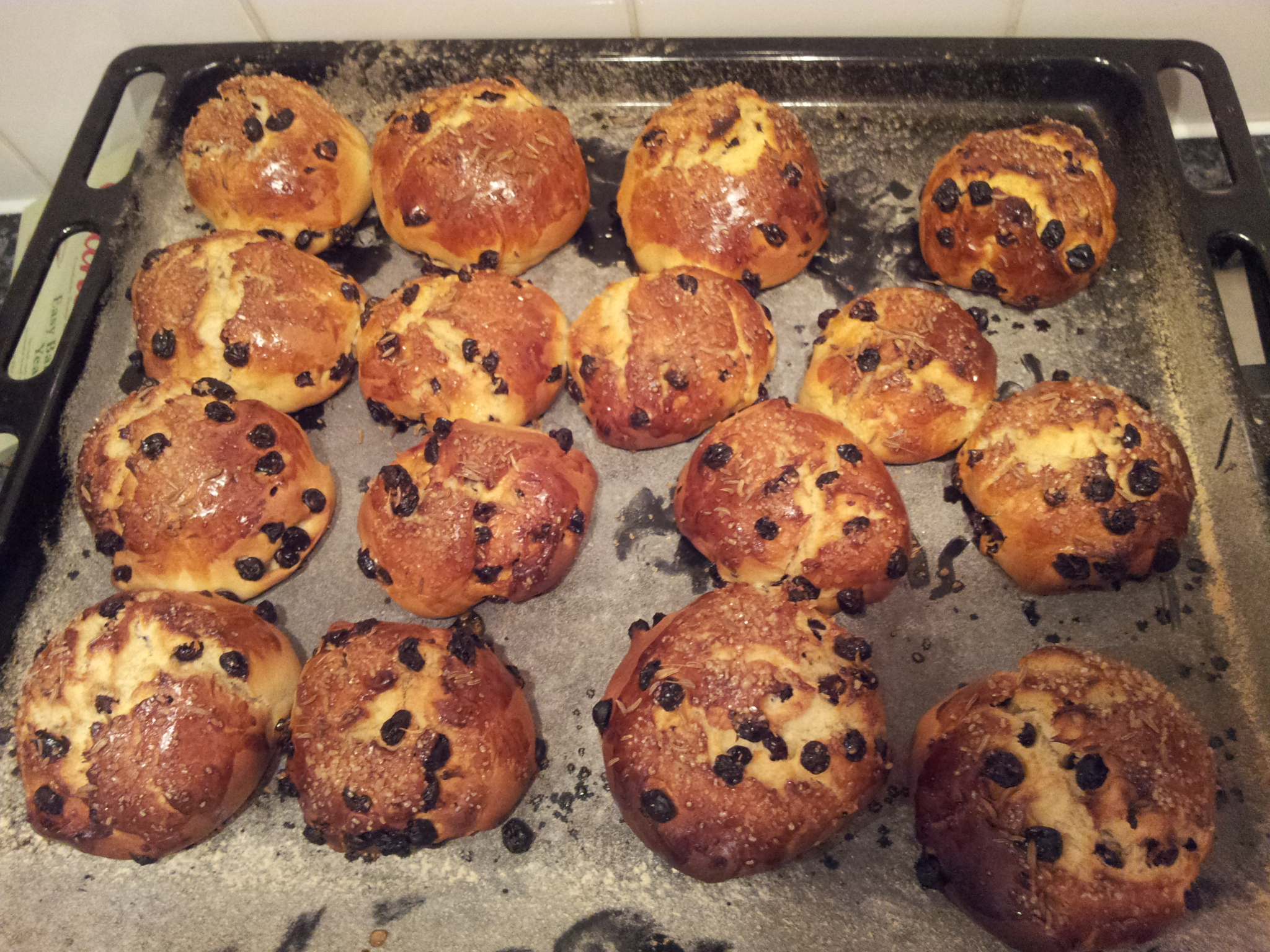
Individual home-baked Cornish saffron or revel buns

Most commercially available saffron buns and cakes today contain food dyes that enhance the natural yellow provided by saffron. The very high cost of saffron – the world's most expensive spice by weight – makes the inclusion of sufficient saffron to produce a rich colour an uneconomical option. The addition of food colouring in Cornish saffron buns was already common by the end of the First World War when the scarcity of saffron tempted bakers to find other ways to colour their products.

== See also ==
- List of British breads
- List of buns

== Bibliography ==
- Davidson, Alan. Oxford Companion to Food (1999), "Bun". p. 114, ISBN 0-19-211579-0
