= Expedition Linné =

- Directed by: Mattias Klum; Folke Rydén
- Produced by: Folke Rydén
- Cinematography: Mattias Klum
- Music by: Patrik Andrén; Peter Nylander
- Distributed by: Sandrew Metronome Distribution Sverige AB
- Release date: 27 April 2007
- Running time: 72 minutes
- Country: Sweden
- Languages: Swedish, English

Expedition Linné is a 2007 documentary film made for the 300th anniversary of the birth of Swedish botanist, physician, and zoologist Carl Linnaeus. The film was made by Swedish wildlife photographer Mattias Klum and journalist Folke Rydén and is intended to increase public understanding of and respect for nature in a journey through the seven continents, into space, and across the oceans.

Prince Carl Philip of Sweden was on the film team for training in his studies of graphic design.
