= Light of Christ =

Christian theological concept

The light of Christ is a concept in Christianity deriving from several passages in the New Testament. One of the main reference points for 'the light of Christ,' is in the prologue of John's Gospel, John 1:9, "That was the true Light, which lighteth every man that cometh into the world" (KJV Bible). Another is the Apostle Paul's citation "Christ will shine on you" (Ephesians 5, Ephesians 5:14).

Notable writers on the concept of the light of Christ include Ephrem the Syrian in the fourth century, Severus of Antioch in the sixth century, and the Quaker William Penn.

== See also ==
- Divine light
