= Birgit Ridderstedt =

American singer

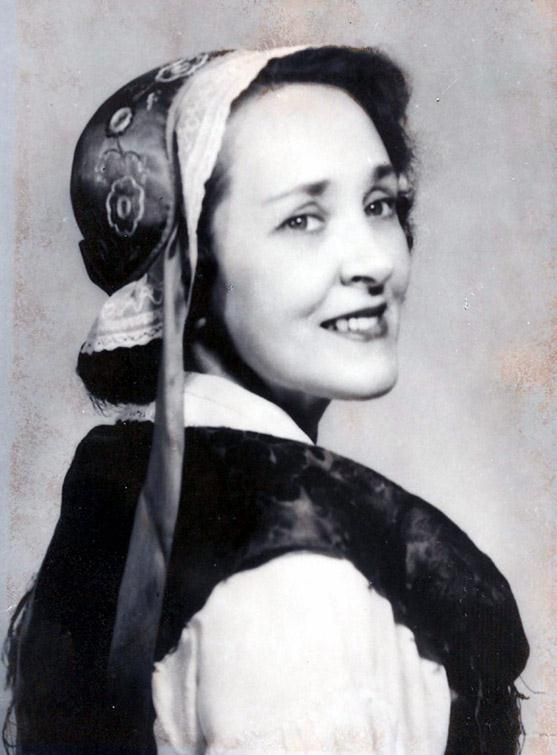
- Her regional folk costume from Stora Tuna in the Dales Province (Dalecarlia) was Birgit Ridderstedt's usual performing wardrobe. Photo: FamSAC.

Background information
- Also known as: Bebe or Bibbi Ridderstedt
- Born: Ragnhild Birgit Anderson; November 26, 1914; Ludvika, Sweden
- Died: September 16, 1985 (aged 70)
- Genres: Singer and producer
- Years active: 1936–1973

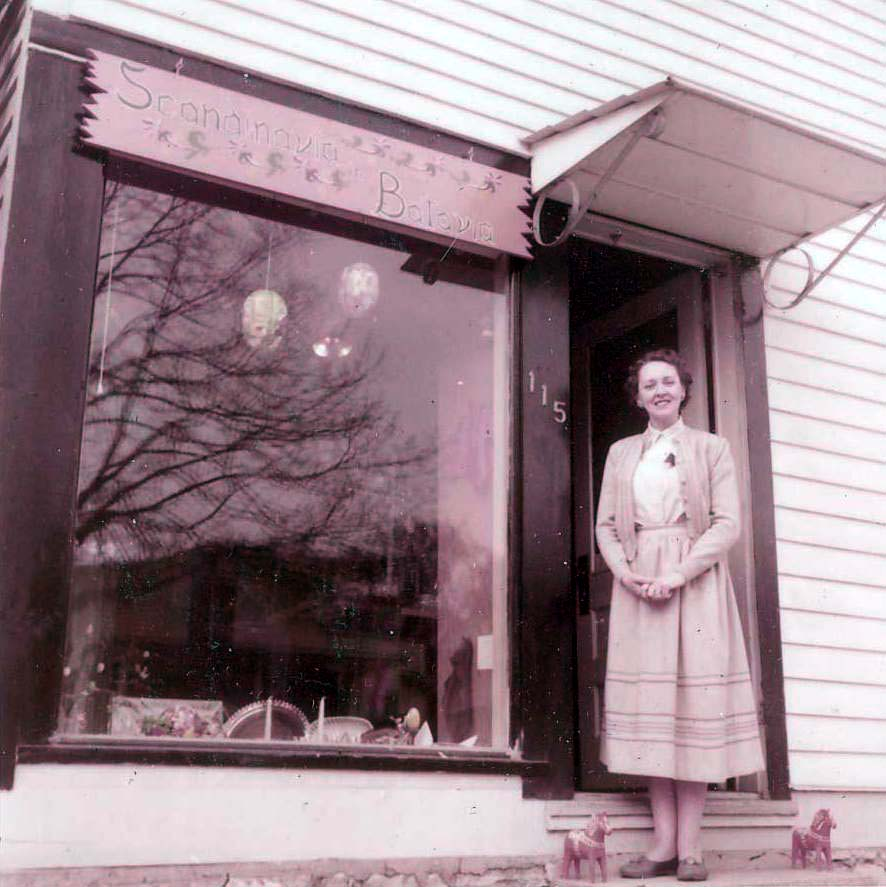
Ridderstedt at her gift shop "Scandinavia in Batavia" in 1957.

Birgit Ridderstedt (November 26, 1914 – September 16, 1985) was a Swedish-American folk singer who appeared at festivals and on television in the 1950s and early 1960s with material she produced herself.

== Background ==
Born in Ludvika, Sweden, a daughter of Stefan Anderson and Ragnhild Fredrika Sandberg, she emigrated with her husband C. Erik Ridderstedt and their two small sons Stefan and Lars-Erik to the United States in 1950, settling in Chicago and later in Batavia, Illinois.

== Career ==
Ridderstedt gave presentations on Scandinavian music and folklore on WTTW and WGN television in Chicago in the 1950s and early 1960s. She began by assisting her husband's business as an importer of gift items and handcrafted artwork from Sweden. She appeared on public service and commercial television in Chicago. On Polka Go-Round she featured young children singing Swedish songs and high school youths folk dancing. When after 12 years Ridderstedt left Illinois, a total of 45 young people had been with her on some ten TV programs about such Scandinavian celebrations as Midsummer, Lucy Day and Passion Plays; she had also performed four times with her groups in the annual Swedish Days festivities of Geneva, Illinois, and had appeared with orations and songs for various organizations.

Ridderstedt organized entertainment for festivals and parades in the Fox Valley (Illinois), and also opened her own gift shop. Ridderstedt returned to Sweden in 1962 with her family, but was also active in western Florida in the 1970s with her folk song programs.

The Ridderstedt couple lived in the Stockholm suburb of Täby after they retired; her husband died in 1982. Their grave is in Stora Tuna Churchyard.

== Songs ==
Ridderstedt wrote several songs of her own in the early 1950s, which have been registered with STIM.
