= Folke Rydén =

Swedish journalist and filmmaker

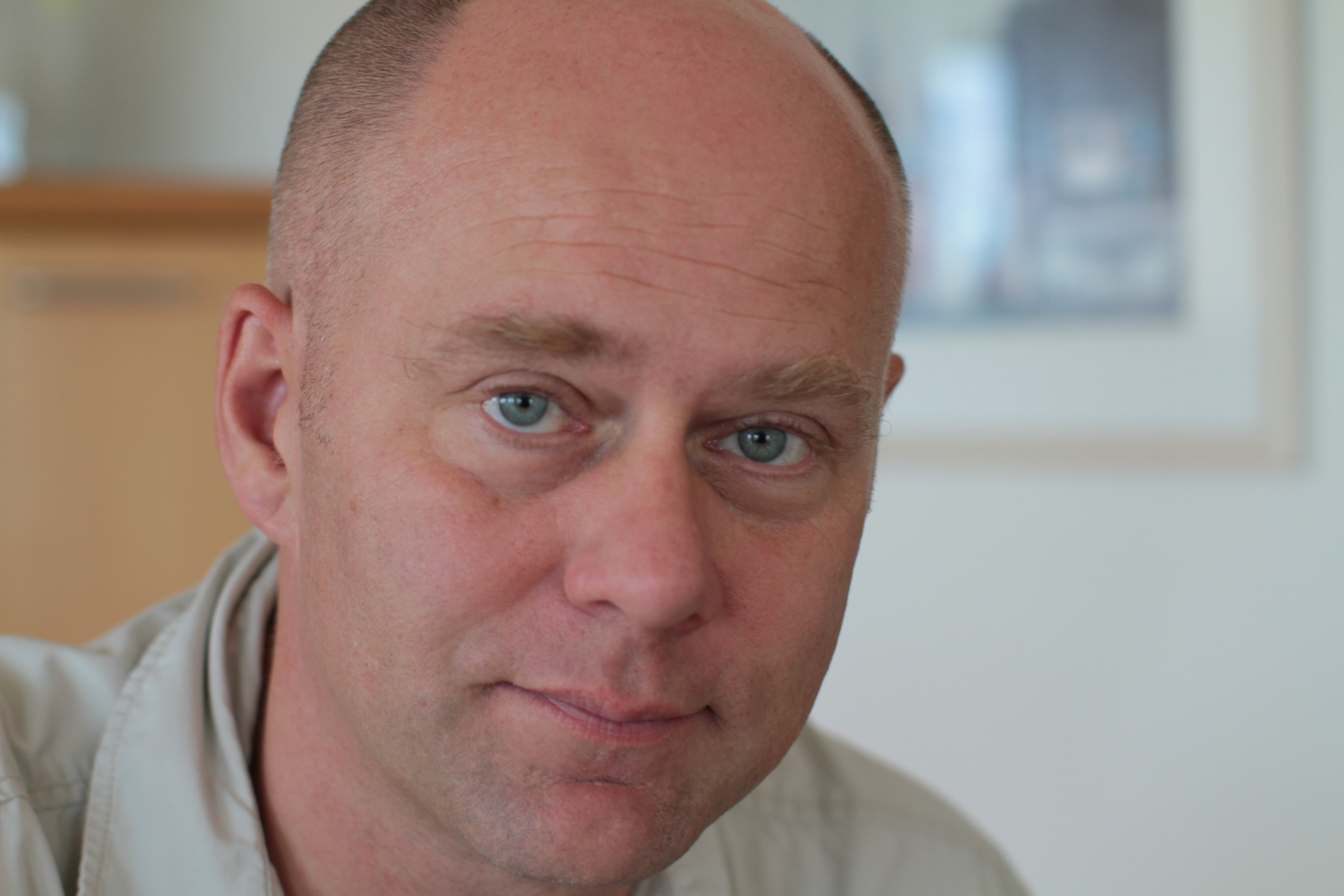
- Photo: Enno Ladwig.
- Born: Folke Gunnar Rydén; 17 September 1958 (age 67); Uppsala, Sweden
- Occupations: Journalist and Filmmaker
- Website: www.folkeryden.com

Folke Gunnar Rydén (born 17 September 1958 in Uppsala, Sweden) is a Swedish journalist and filmmaker.

Rydén has won numerous international awards and his documentaries have been shown all over the world. In 1993, he was awarded the Bonnier Grand Prize in journalism – the most prestigious journalism award in Sweden.

His productions have garnered dozens of international awards.

== Selected productions ==
- United States of Guns (1993)
- Björn Borg - The Saga (1997)
- Laredo & the Law (1999)
- Murder in Malexander (2001)
- The Yassier Arafat Story (2002)
- The Boy With No Face (2003)
- The Tsunami Generation (2005)
- Expedition Linné (2007)
- From Bill to Barack (2008)
- For Cod´s Sake (2009)
- The Prize of Gold (2012)
- The Second Wave (2013)
