= Stefan Anderson =

Swedish industrialist, journalist and master craftsman

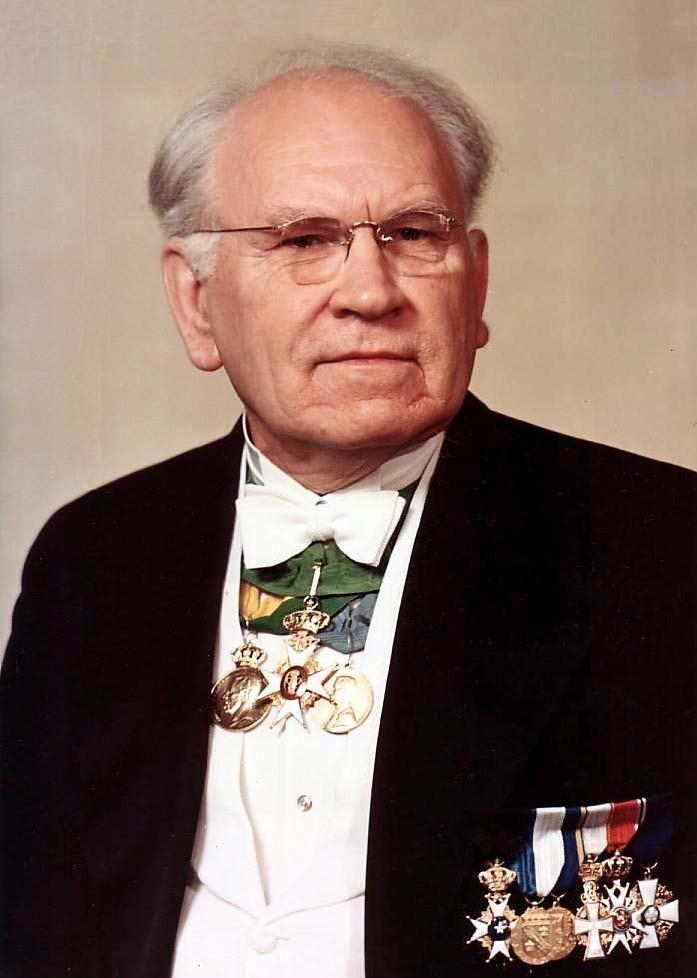
Anderson in a formal birthday portrait in 1958

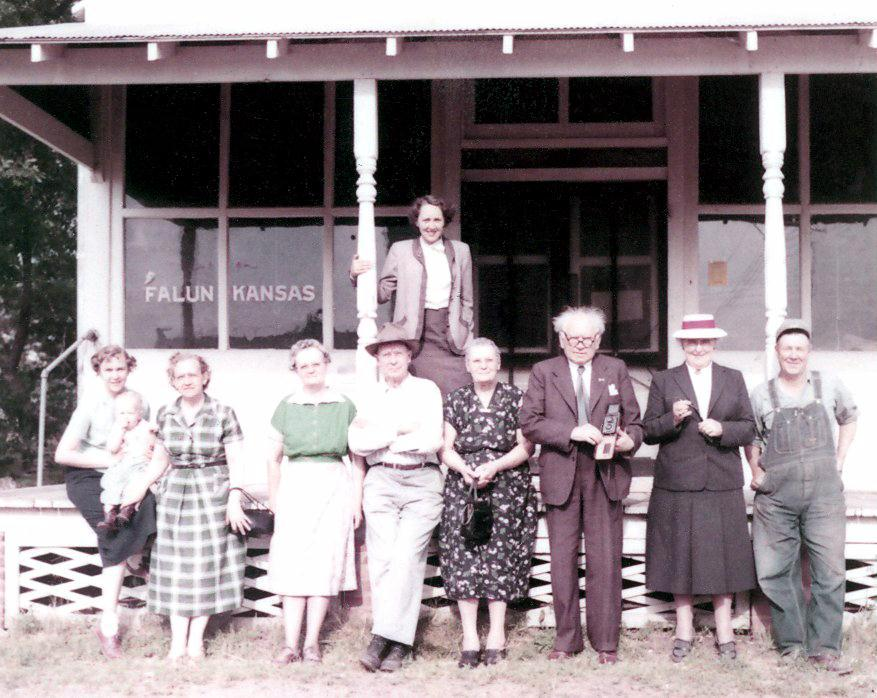
Anderson (third from right) visiting Falun, Kansas with his wife and daughter Birgit Ridderstedt in 1955

Knut Stefan Anderson (26 December 1878 – 8 May 1966) was a Swedish industrialist, journalist and master craftsman clockmaker/watchmaker decorated with badges of chivalric orders by the Kings of Sweden, Denmark and Norway and the President of Finland.

Anderson was born in Enköping, Sweden. He was the son of August T. Anderson and Hildegard von Reis and began to learn watchmaking in 1892 at age 13 in Norrköping.

From 1910 to 1953 he wrote regular articles in trade papers and was also their editor, often using the pseudonym Stander.

Anderson was instrumental in organizing watchmakers and craftsmen into permanent trade organizations in Scandinavia and Germany, which he then led as CEO in terms of service lasting for decades. He is considered by some the most important industrial organizer in his field in the history of his country and in 1971 had a watchmaker's college named for him in Borensberg.

Ludvika Town Hall has a clock designed and installed by Anderson in its tower since the building was dedicated in 1938 (mechanism replaced in 2004).

The well-known quality classification Stjärnurmakarna for Swedish watchmakers and merchants was originally registered and protected by Anderson, who also in 1944 created a specially designed insurance policy for them, and since 1952 a Swedish gold medal for contributions to watchmaking bears Anderson's likeness and name.

Anderson married Ragnhild Sandberg of Ludvika in 1907. Of their five children one son was Swedish senator Stig Stefanson, a daughter was singer Birgit Ridderstedt and a grandson is photographer Mattias Klum.

Anderson died in Ludvika where his family grave is in the Old Cemetery (G:a kyrkogården)
