= Ludvika =

Place in Dalarna, Sweden

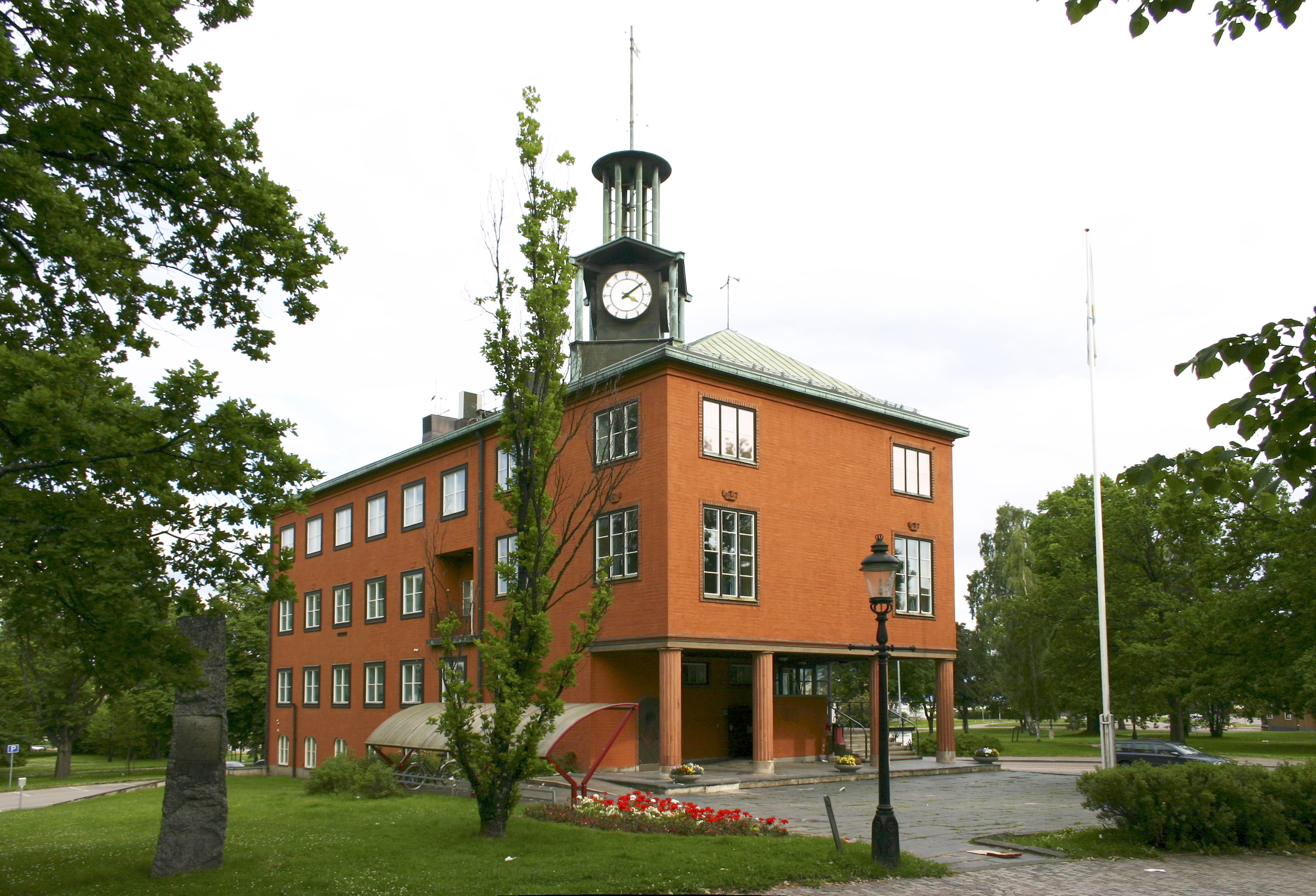
- Ludvika Town Hall

- Coat of arms

- Location within Dalarna Location within Sweden
- Coordinates: 60°08′N 15°11′E
- Country: Sweden
- Province: Dalarna
- County: Dalarna County
- Municipality: Ludvika Municipality and Smedjebacken Municipality

Area
  - Total: 11 km^{2} (4.2 sq mi)

Population (31 December 2010)
  - Total: 14,498
  - Density: 1,318/km^{2} (3,410/sq mi)
- Time zone: UTC+1 (CET)
  - Summer (DST): UTC+2 (CEST)

Ludvika (Swedish pronunciation: [ˈlɵ̂dːˌviːka]) is a bimunicipal city and the seat of Ludvika Municipality, Dalarna County within the country of Sweden, with 14,498 inhabitants in 2010.

== Overview ==
The conurbation of Ludvika extends over the border of Smedjebacken Municipality, where about 400 inhabitants live.

Ludvika is situated by Lake Väsman in the south-east part of the municipality.

Population of Ludvika as of 2005 distributed by municipalities:

| Municipality | Population in Ludvika | Other urban areas | Other | Total | % of municipality population |
|---|---|---|---|---|---|
| Ludvika | 13.726 | 9,234 | 3,232 | 26,450 | 52.87 |
| Smedjebacken | 392 | 7,595 | 3,577 | 11,598 | 3.67 |
| Total | 14,018 | 16,829 | 6,809 | 38,048 | 37.87 |

== Economy ==
A major employer in Ludvika is the power engineering conglomerate Hitachi, whose activities in the town include power transformers, capacitors, ac breakers and equipment for high-voltage direct current power transmission.

== Notable natives ==
- Stefan Anderson
- Dan Andersson
- Hypocrisy (band)
- Mats Kihlström
- Christina Lampe-Önnerud
- Kee Marcello
- Charlie Norman
- Birgit Ridderstedt
- Jari Sillanpää
- Fredrik Söderström
- Anders Wendin
- Anders Winroth

== Sports ==
The following sports clubs are located in Ludvika:

- Ludvika FK
- Östansbo IS

== Schools ==
- Lorensberga
- Kyrkskolan
- Junibacken skola
- Knutsbo skola
