= Väsman =

Lake Väsman
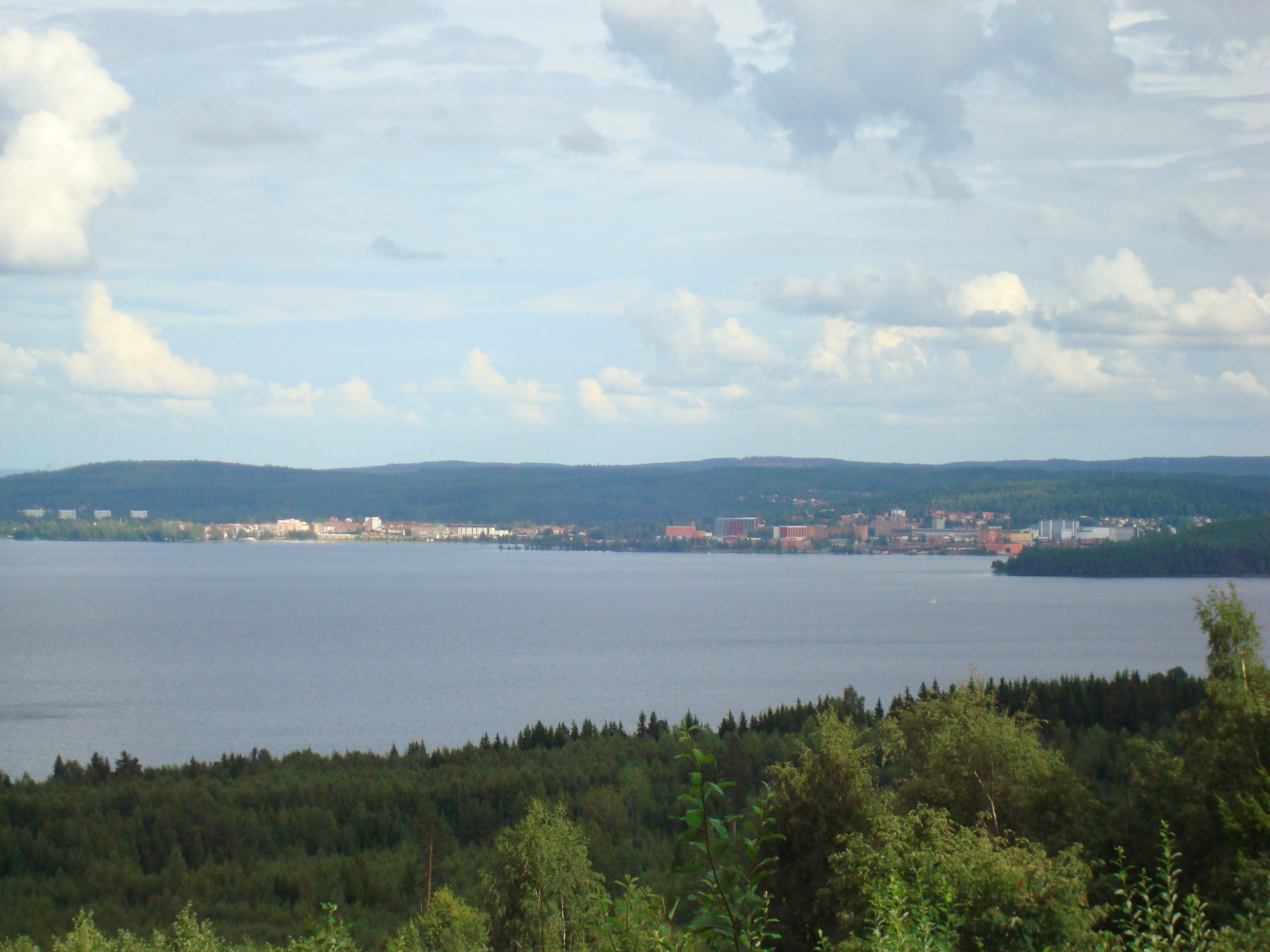
- Lake Väsman with Ludvika in the background

- Location within Dalarna Location within Sweden
- Location: Dalarna County, Ludvika Municipality
- Coordinates: 60.18554°N 15.07306°E
- Type: Lake
- Catchment area: 1,147.86 km^{2} (443.19 sq mi)
- Basin countries: Sweden
- Surface area: 39.1 km^{2} (15.1 sq mi)
- Max. depth: 53 m (174 ft)
- Shore length^{1}: 69.4 km (43.1 mi)
- Surface elevation: 154 m (505 ft)
- Islands: Sollen, Granön
- Settlements: Ludvika
- ^{1} Shore length is not a well-defined measure.

Lake Väsman (Swedish pronunciation: [ˈvɛ̌ːsman]) is a lake in Ludvika Municipality in Dalarna County of Sweden, in the Norrström main basin.

== Description ==
Lake Väsman is 53 metres (174 ft) deep, has an area of 39.1 square kilometres (15.1 sq mi) and is 154 metres (505 ft) above sea level. It is about 14 kilometres (8.7 mi) long in a southeasterly direction, with a width of 1.5 to 6 kilometres (0.93 to 3.73 mi).

In the past, there was steamboat traffic on the lake.

There is a major iron ore deposit below the lake, estimated at 640 million tonnes. In 2011 the Nordic Iron Ore company said it would try to start mining.

== Basin ==
Lake Väsman is included in the sub-basin called the outlet of Väsman. The average altitude is 209 metres (686 ft) above sea level and the area is 136.46 square kilometres (52.69 sq mi). Including the 53 catchment areas upstream, the accumulated area of the lake's basin is 1,147.86 square kilometres (443.19 sq mi). Kolbäcksån, which drains the catchment, collects water from three rivers before reaching the sea after 260 kilometres (160 mi). The catchment area consists mostly of forest (56%).

== Gallery ==
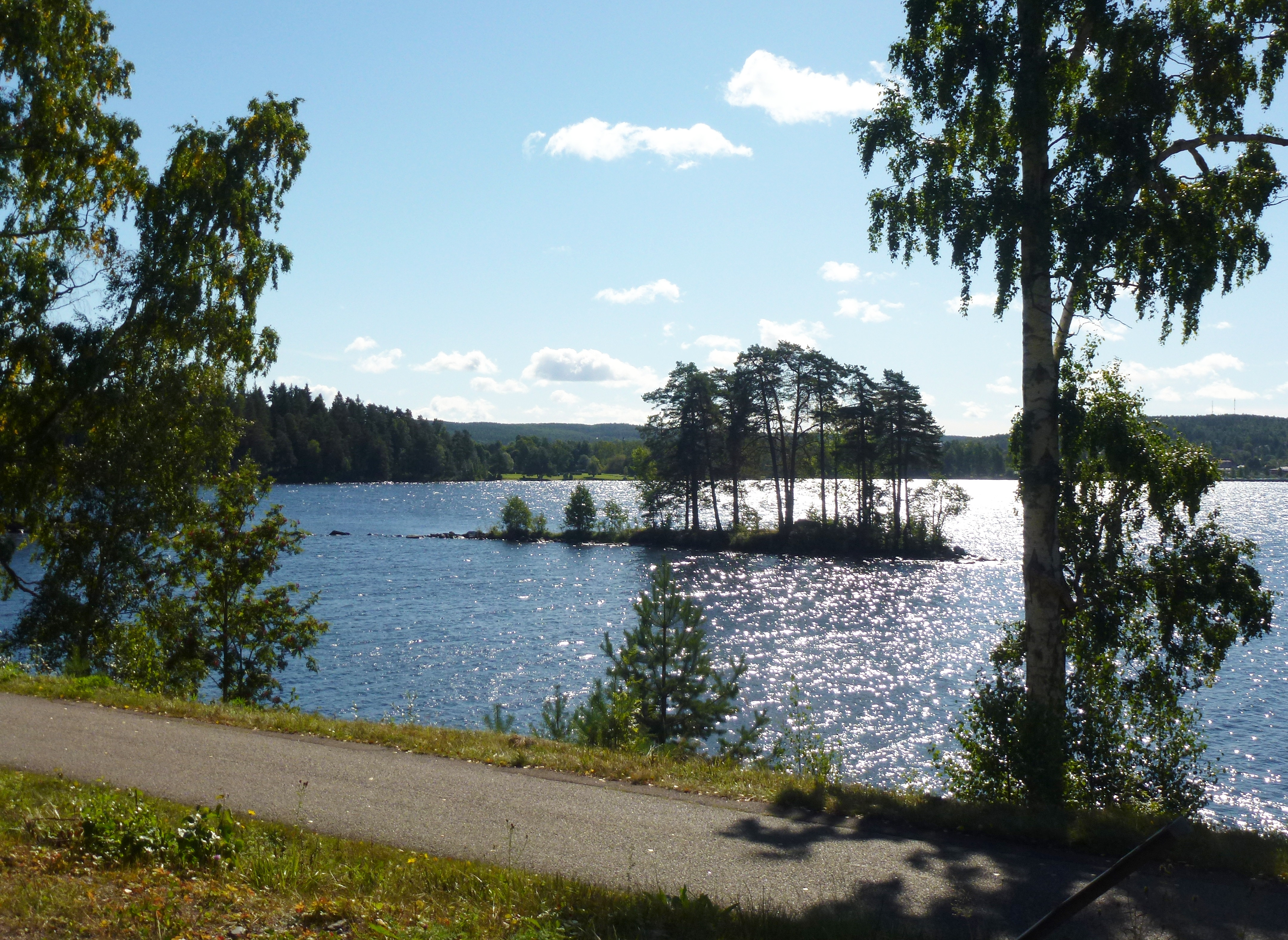
Väsman at Sörvik with Kaffeholmen island

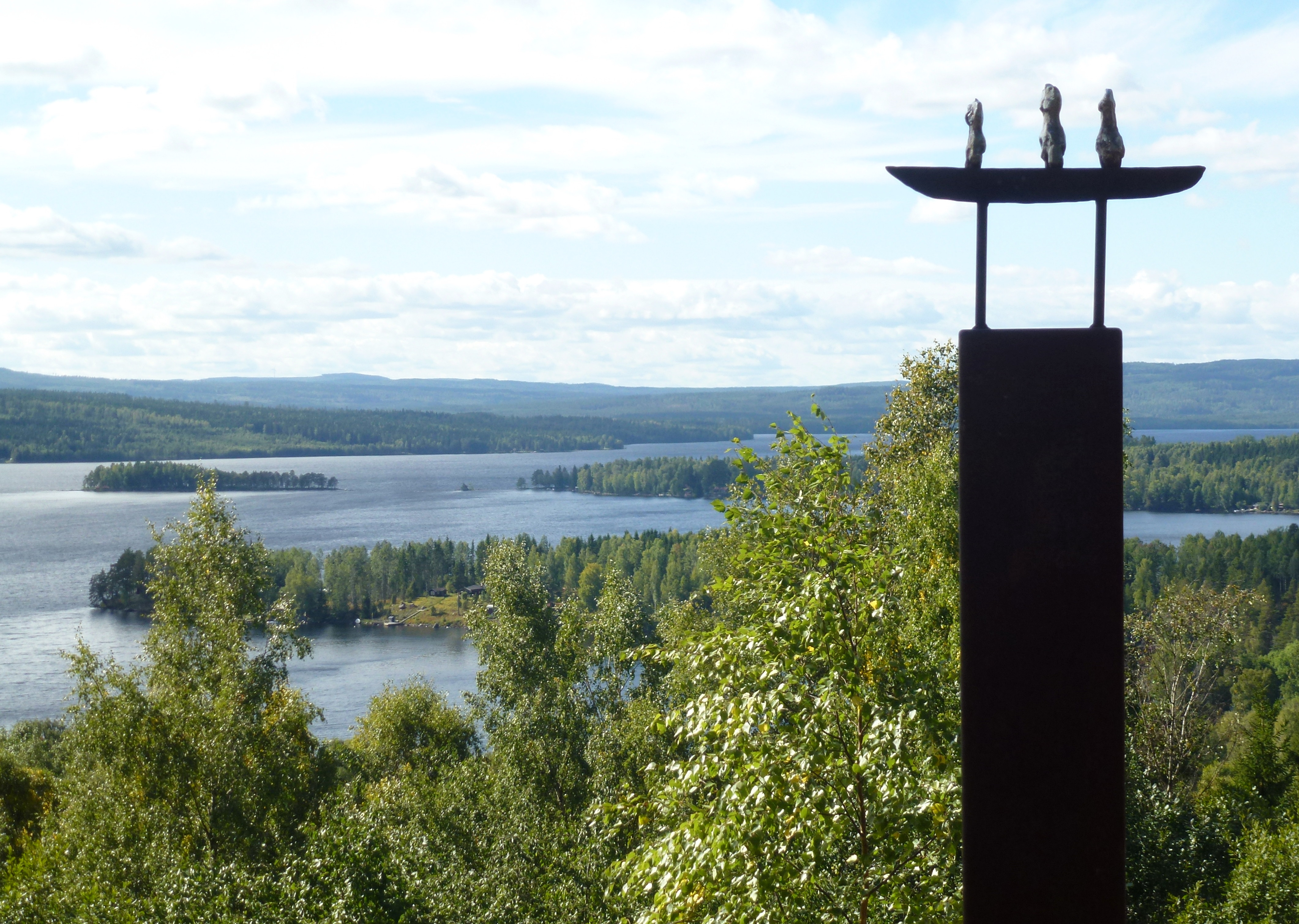
View from Lekombergs mine

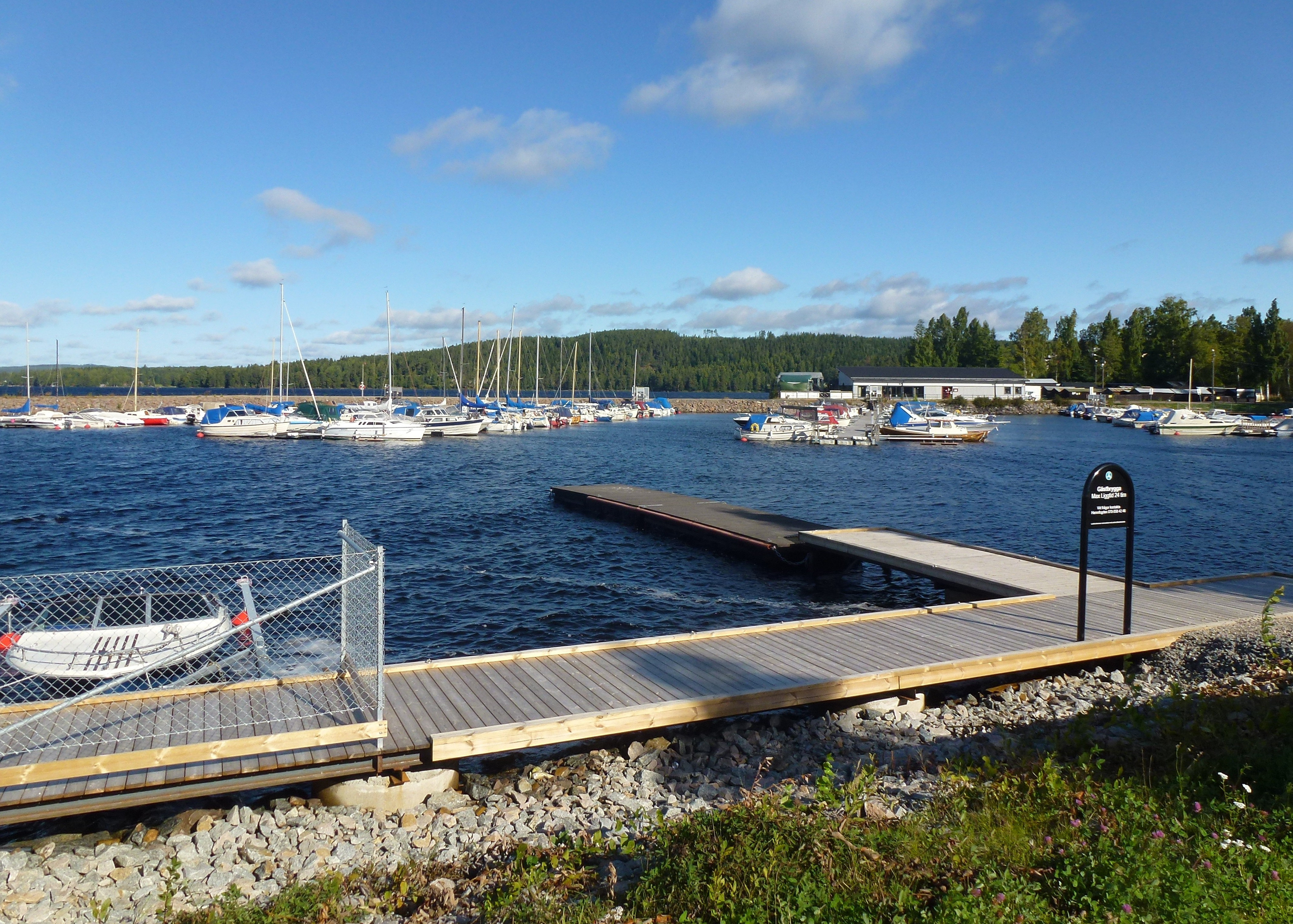
Ludvika port

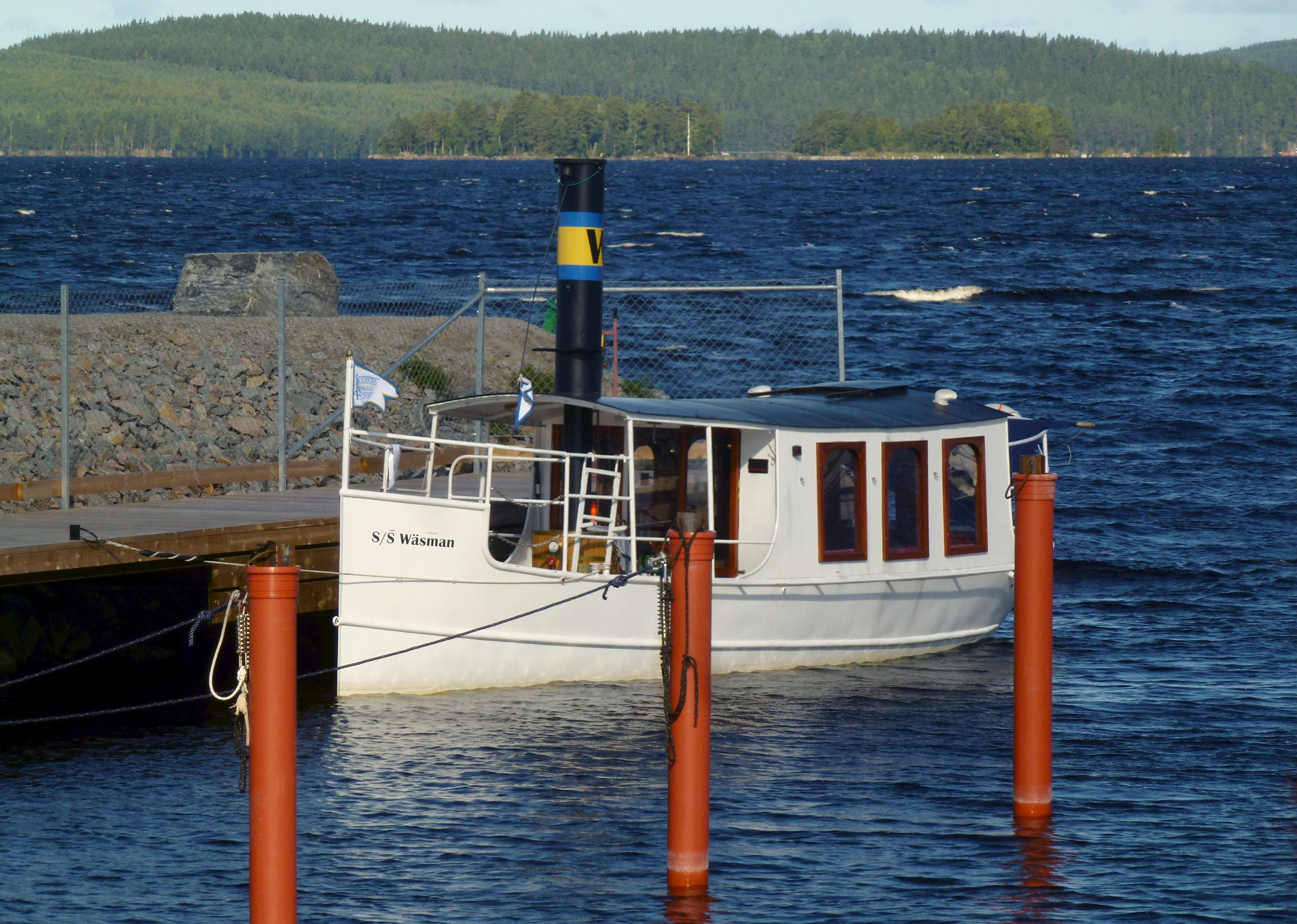
S/S Wäsman in Ludvika port

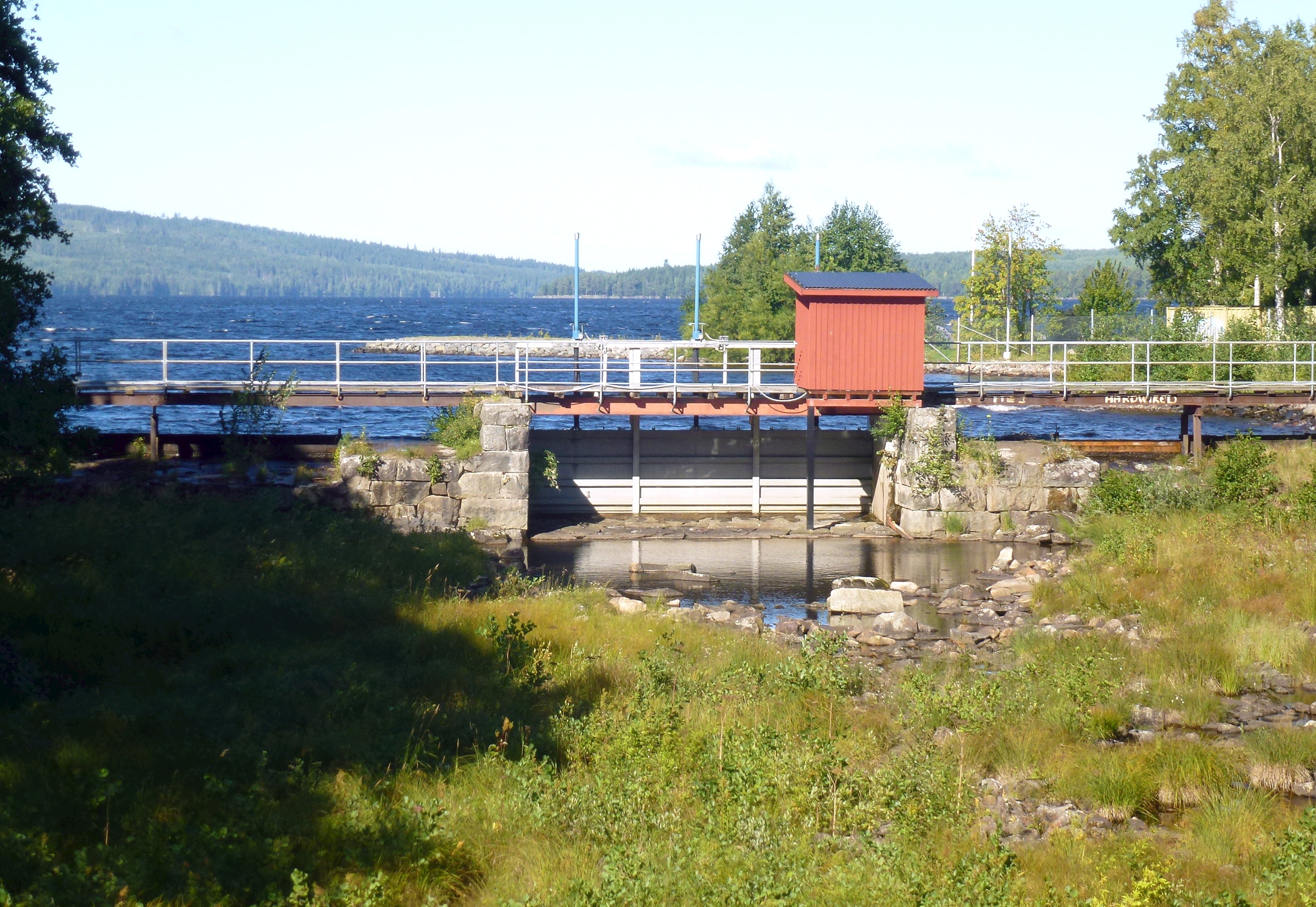
The dam between Ludvika ström and Väsman

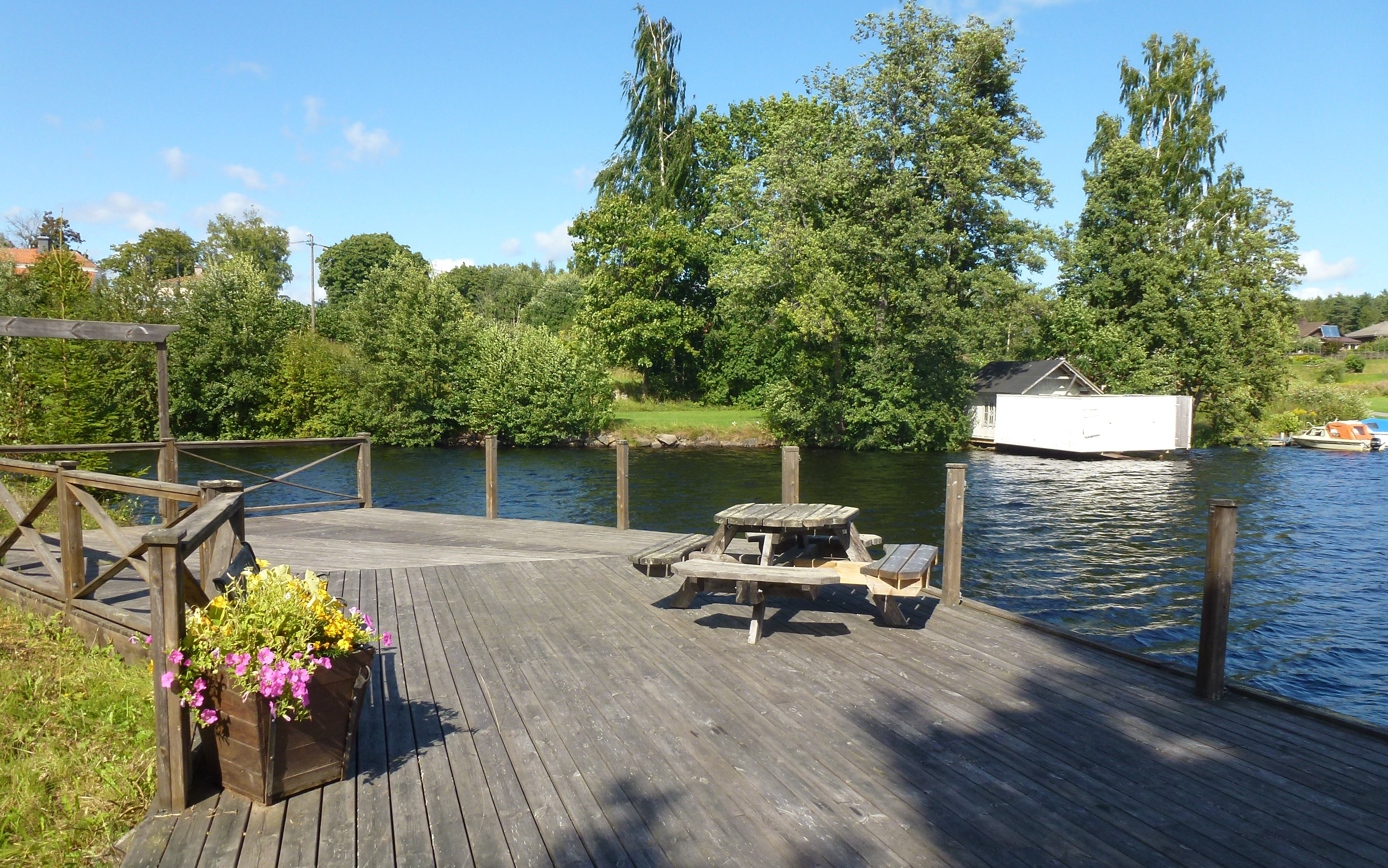
Sunnansjö port
