= Shiley =

Shiley may refer to:

- Bjork–Shiley valve, mechanical heart valve prosthesis
- Donald Shiley, one of the co-inventors of Pfizer's Bjork-Shiley heart valve
- Jean Shiley (1911–1998), former American high jumper
- Shiley tube, a cuffed tracheostomy tube
