= Granön (Dalarna) =

Island and nature reserve in Lake Väsman

- Location within Sweden

Geography
- Coordinates: 60.190012°N 15.047783°E
- Adjacent to: Lake Väsman

Administration
- Sweden
- County: Dalarna County
- Municipality: Ludvika Municipality

Demographics
- Population: Uninhabited

Granön is an island and nature reserve in Lake Väsman, near Ludvika in Dalarna county, central Sweden.

== Description ==
Granön is one of the largest islands in Lake Väsman. It is small but quite hilly. The nearby islet of Grankavlen is also part of the nature reserve. The island is accessible by boat in the summer. It has a mosaic forest that has not been affected by forest management for many years. This includes plenty of dead wood and deciduous trees, valuable for bird life. Some parts are dominated by pine or spruce. In the southwestern part there is aspen and birch, and some gray and black alder, and an unusual variety of elder. Flora includes saplings, mosses, lichens and fungi.

Visitors to the reserve must be careful to cause minimal impact to the ground, rocks, dead wood or living things. Flowers, mosses, lichens or wood fungi must not be picked or dug up. No motor vehicles are allowed, or dogs off the leash. Permission is required to collect plants, animals or natural objects, or to ring birds, for teaching or research purposes.
