= Sorvik =

Sorvik or variant, may refer to:

== Places ==
- Sørvik, Harstad Municipality, Troms, Norway
- Sörvik, Ludvika Municipality, Dalarna County, Sweden

== People ==
- Birger Sörvik (1879–1978), Swedish Olympic gymnast
- Daniel Sørvik (born 1990), Norwegian ice hockey player
- Haakon Sörvik (1886–1970), Swedish Olympic gymnast
- Leif Sörvik (1889–1963), Swedish Olympic rower
- Terje Sørvik (born 1967), Norwegian politician
