= Pier Augusto Breccia =

Italian painter

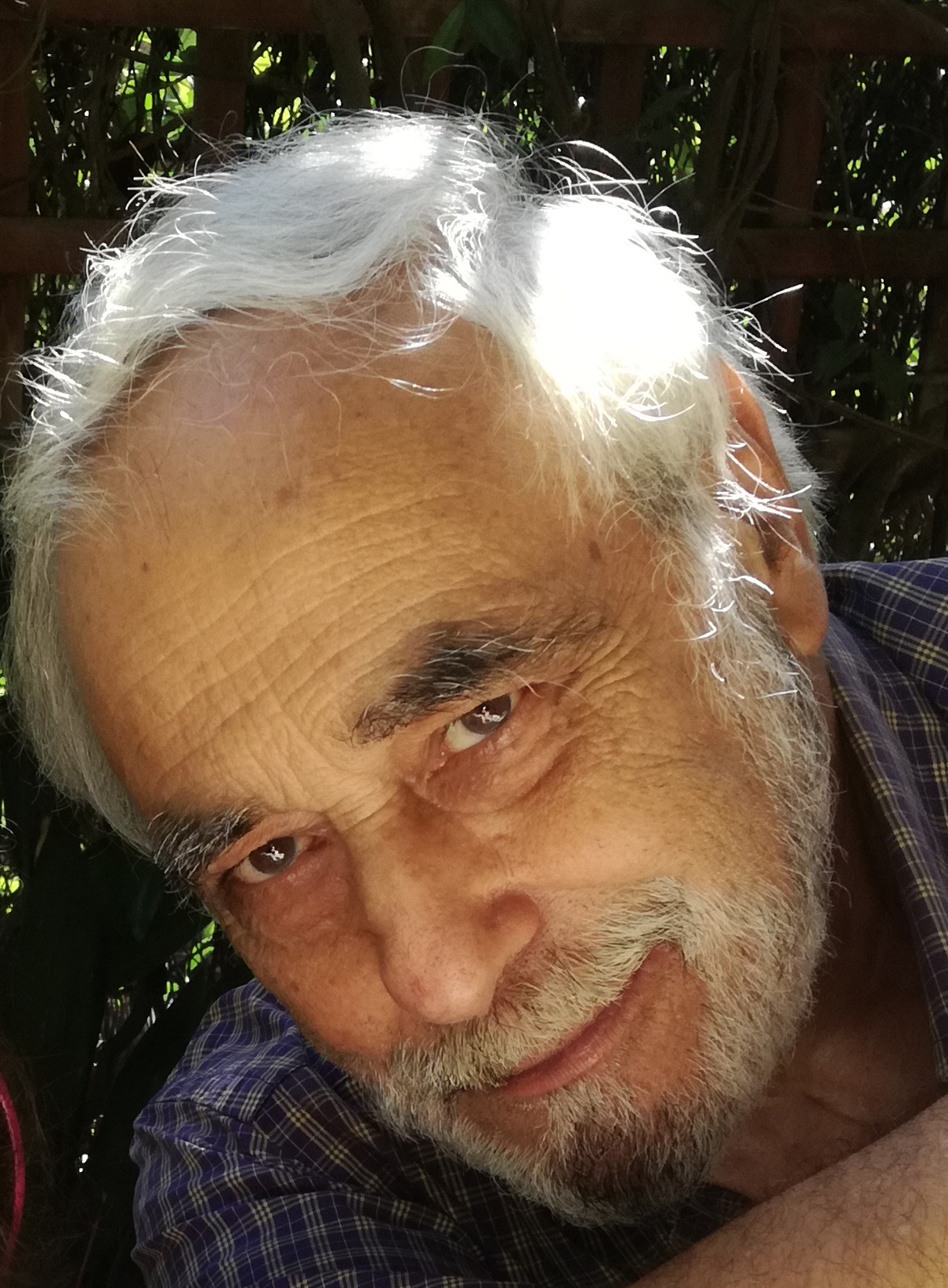
- Born: 12 April 1943; Trento, Italy
- Died: 20 November 2017 (aged 74)
- Known for: paintings

Pier Augusto Breccia (12 April 1943 – 20 November 2017) was an Italian artist, philosopher and short story writer. His artistic works explore the human being with a hermeneutic approach (in the sense of the modern hermeneutic philosophy, Jaspers, Heidegger, Gadamer) and engage in a variety of philosophical themes. Breccia's oeuvre consists of oil paintings, pencil and oil pastel drawings, 7 books, 10 short stories and numerous other works. Breccia has held around 80 one-man shows all over the world.

== Education and early life ==
Pier Augusto Breccia was born in Trento, in North-Eastern Italy, on April 12, 1943. His father's family had originated from a small Umbrian village, Porano, in Central Italy, to where his mother, Elsa Faini from Trento, had moved towards the end of WW II. Pier Augusto's parents were both clinicians: Elsa was a chief operation theatre nurse, and his father Angelo was a surgeon. When Pier Augusto was five, his family moved from Porano to Rome, where Pier Augusto spent most of his life.

Breccia attended the senior high school “Liceo Classico Giulio Cesare” in Rome, where he developed his lifelong love of humanities. His learning was precocious at a young age: at fourteen he studied Dante’s Divine Comedy, unaided, whose allegoric representations fascinated the young Pier Augusto for their artistic value. Soon afterwards, he discovered the Classics and translated Sophocles' “Antigone” and “Prometheus Bound” by Aeschylus, from Ancient Greek to Italian in blank hendecasyllabics. Still in his adolescence, he also translated Plato's “Dialogues”, which introduced him to Socrates, one of his great teachers.

At eighteen, Breccia graduated from high school with top marks. Despite possessing an extensive knowledge of the classics that far surpassed that of his peers, he chose a career path that contrasted with this background. In 1961, he began a career in science, following in his father's footsteps. He enrolled in the medical school at the newly inaugurated Catholic University of Rome (Università Cattolica del Sacro Cuore), and in July 1967, in reward for an outstanding academic performance, he was selected to receive the first Medical Degree of the new school with highest marks and honours.

== Medical life ==
After graduating "cum laude", Breccia was awarded a scholarship to continue his studies, and specialized in Urology, General Surgery and later in Cardiovascular Surgery. He also began practising at the Agostino Gemelli University Polyclinic in Rome. Breccia married Maria Antonietta Vinciguerra in 1969, and by 1971 his two children were born. During the early seventies, his commitment to surgery took him to Stockholm, where he worked in the Centre of Thoracic and Cardiovascular Surgery at the Karolinska Institute under the supervision of Viking Björk. While Breccia's work in Sweden during the early 1970s kept him away from his family, he maintained his position at the Catholic University in Rome's Gemelli Hospital. In 1979, he was appointed Associate Professor and clinical lecturer in General Surgery. Throughout the 1970s, he performed over one thousand open-heart surgeries and published more than fifty papers in medical journals.

== A turning point: from the bistoury to a pencil ==
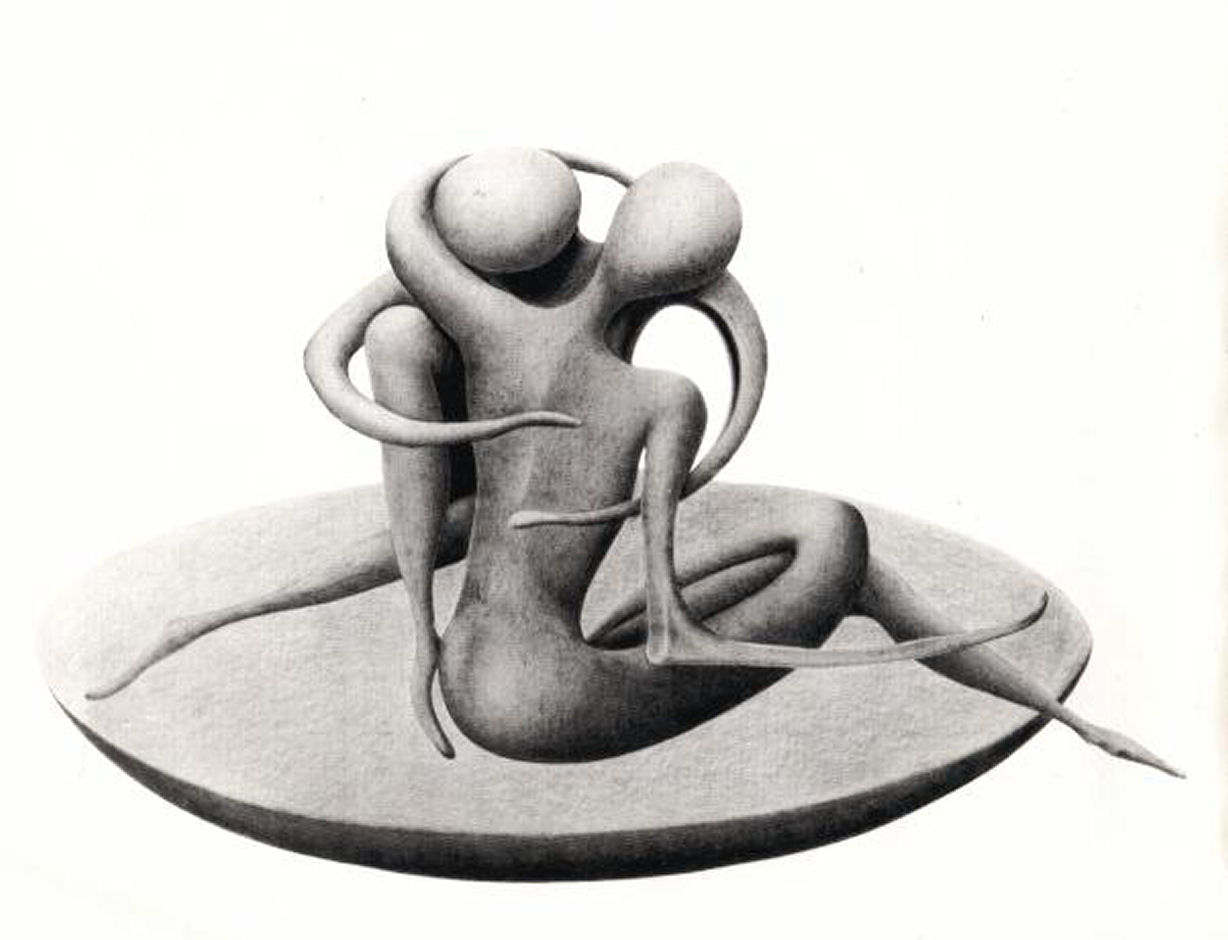
Rifugio d'amore, pencil on paper, Pier Auggusto Breccia, 1979

It was in 1977 during a summer holiday, when, Pier Augusto discovered an unknown skill for drawing and fascinated by his new-found talent, in the following two years, Breccia practiced drawing, which yet remained nothing more than a hobby. However, in 1979, after the death of his father Angelo, his drawing talent found a creative expression . The deep interest in Classics of his youth, matured by his human experience of fifteen years of medical life, re-emerged anew. In the following two years, he prepared his ‘opera prima’, Oltreomega (Beyond Omega), a book of drawings and philosophical thoughts, presented in October 1981 by the Italian critic and poet Cesare Vivaldi, the Director of the Fine Art Academy of Rome. The work was received with critical and public acclaim.

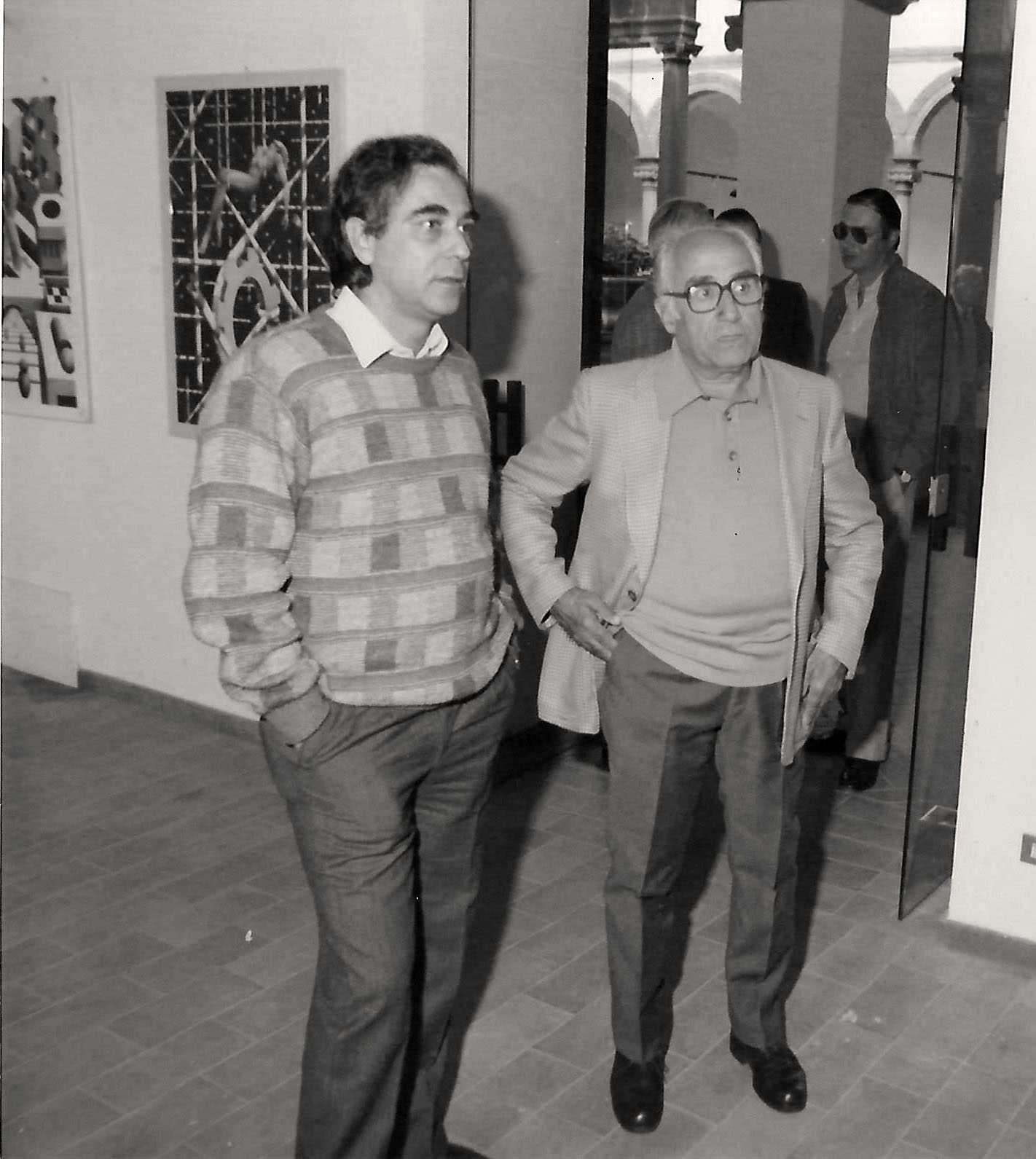
Pier Augusto Breccia and Emilio Greco. Exhibition: "Oltreomega", Galleria Maitani, Orvieto, 1981

Between 1981 and 1983, Breccia held a number of exhibitions in Italy and abroad (‘Choral Monologue’, ‘The concrete shapes of the non-existent’, ‘The Semantics of Silence’), and his new involvement as an artist became so absorbing that, in August 1983, Breccia took a leave of absence from his medical position. During the next two years, his artistic style, which Breccia called "ideomorphic", became more defined, as well as his aesthetic philosophy, which he presented in his 1984 book, “L’Eterno Mortale”. He resigned his position as a surgeon in 1985, when he had two consecutive exhibitions in New York, in the Gucci Gallery and the Arras Gallery. His new career, which Breccia felt more as a “mission” , developed rapidly and as he resigned as a surgeon, he moved to New York where he spent most of his time between 1985 and 1996. During this period, he had exhibitions throughout the United States, in New York, Columbus, Santa Fe, Miami and Houston.

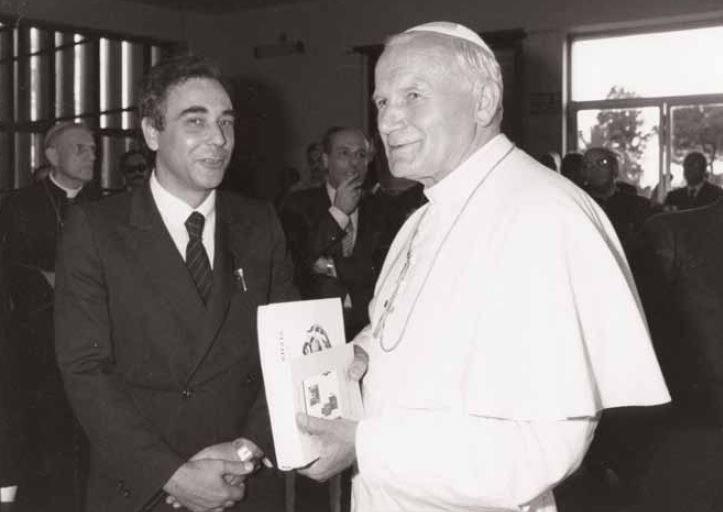
Pier Augusto Breccia and Pope John Paul II, Rome, 1985

From the very beginning of his journey as an artist, Breccia was extremely prolific. His first ten years of artistic production and philosophic reflections were presented in his 1992 book, “Animus-Anima”, a monumental work, “densely reasoned and rigidly philosophic” which includes 500 images of his paintings and reveals with great lucidity the theoretical postulates of Ideomorphism.

In 1996, Breccia moved back to Rome, from where he exhibited throughout Italy (Palazzo dei Papi, Viterbo, 1997; Vittoriano, Rome, 2002; Palazzo Ziino, Palermo, 2004; Palazzo dei Sette, Orvieto, 2000 and 2007; Palazzo Venezia, Rome, 2007; Rocca Paolina, Perugia, 2010; Fortezza, Montepulciano, 2012) and throughout Europe (Zurich, Brussels, Nice, Montecarlo and Saint Petersburg). In 1996, Breccia wrote "The Other Book", which includes more than a hundred unpublished images from 1991 to 1999 and visionary short stories, critical self reflections and other reflections on the meaning of art and life. In 1999, he wrote “The suspended language of the Self-consciousness” and in 2004 he published “Introduction to Hermeneutic Painting”, his art Manifesto.

On November 17, 2017, two weeks after his last exhibition in Trento, Breccia suffered a heart attack (a third one from 1998) in his studio in Rome; he was taken to the Gemelli Hospital, the same where, forty years earlier, he had devoted himself as a heart surgeon. On Monday, November 20, 2017, Pier Augusto Breccia died at the age of seventy-four.

Throughout his career as an artist, Breccia held around 80 solo exhibitions, and produced works purchased by collectors all over the world.

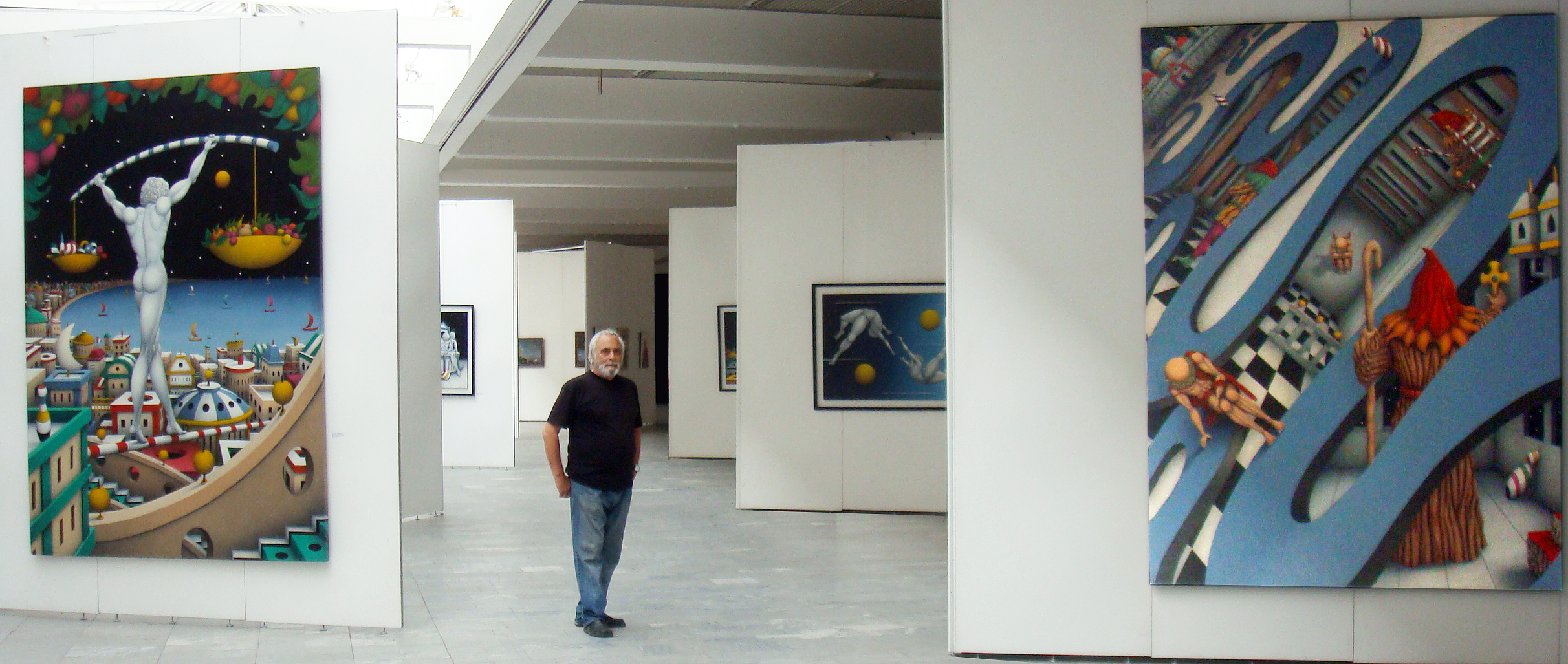
Pier Augusto Breccia. Exhibition: "Hermeneutic Painting", Manege Museum, Saint Petersburg, 2011.

== Reason and imagination: “the thinking space” ==
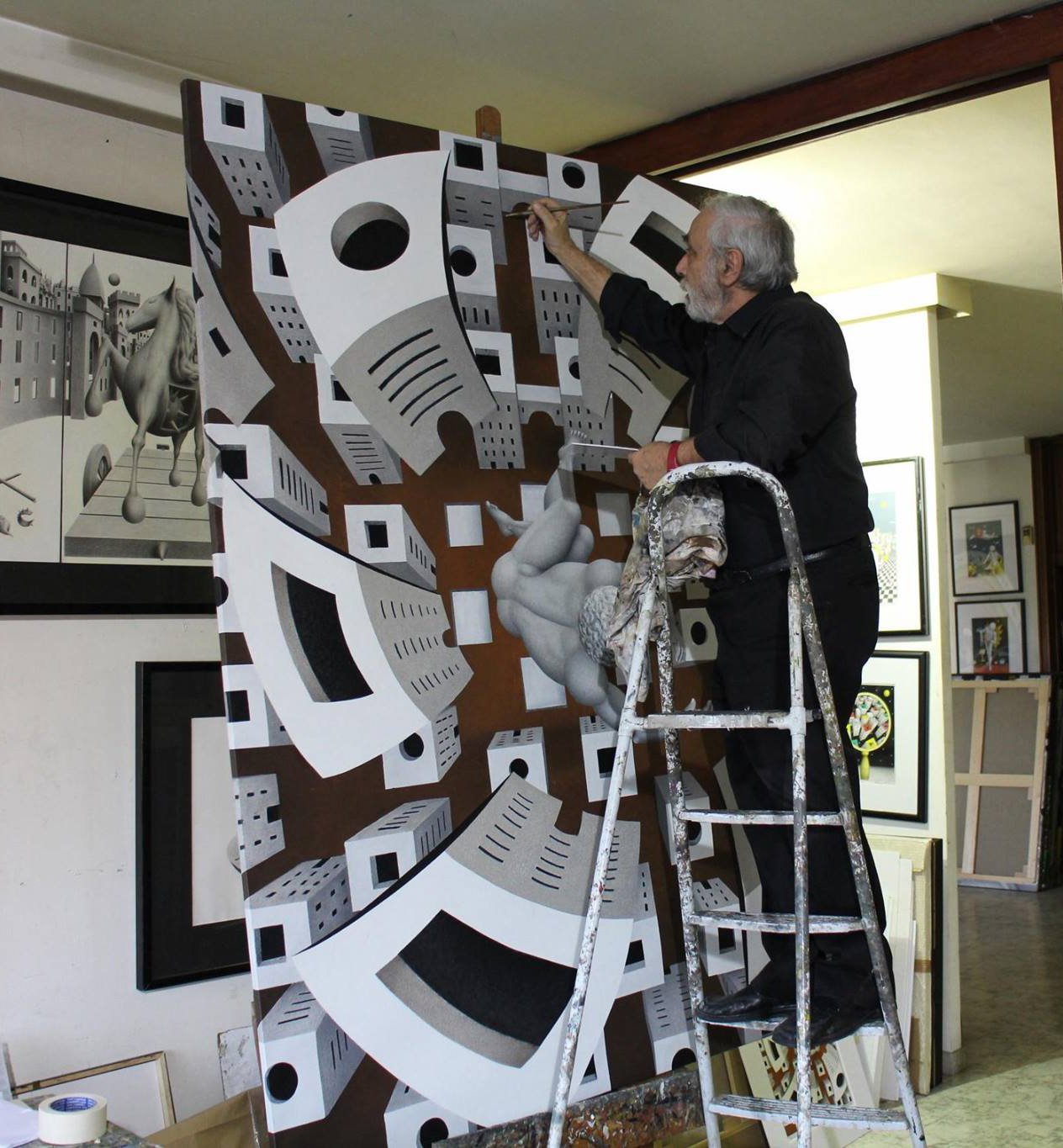
Pier Augusto Breccia painting "Tornado" (oil on canvas) in his studio in Rome, 2014

Space is perhaps the most distinctive element in Breccia's paintings. Two interwoven aspects characterise it. Firstly, a paradoxical sense of space, as the space looks purely rational and purely arbitrary at the same time; “The prospective is apparently precise yet elusive.”(Cesare Vivaldi) This paradox of space is omnipresent in Breccia's canvases and has echoes in the contrast between the technical rigour of the lines, colours, chiaroscuro, and the unreality or impossibility of those elements. “Everything is neatly defined and everything is unlikely; the human anatomy is arbitrary yet detailed”. (Cesare Vivaldi, “Oltreomega”, p. 9).

However, if reason repeatedly suspends itself and collapses in Breccia's space, the sense of harmony and balance, which characterises all of his works, lets the imagination enter into the space without any agonies. The imagination perceives the harmony or rather the perfect balance, where everything is and goes as it should ‘for some reason’, but not for ‘an exact one’.

Thus, the space subjected to reason from what is incomprehensible, immeasurable, and impossible becomes an in-comprehensible and in-possible place, that is, comprehensible and possible from within, or to use Breccia's words: “thinking space”.

== Forms, colours and light: de-objectification ==
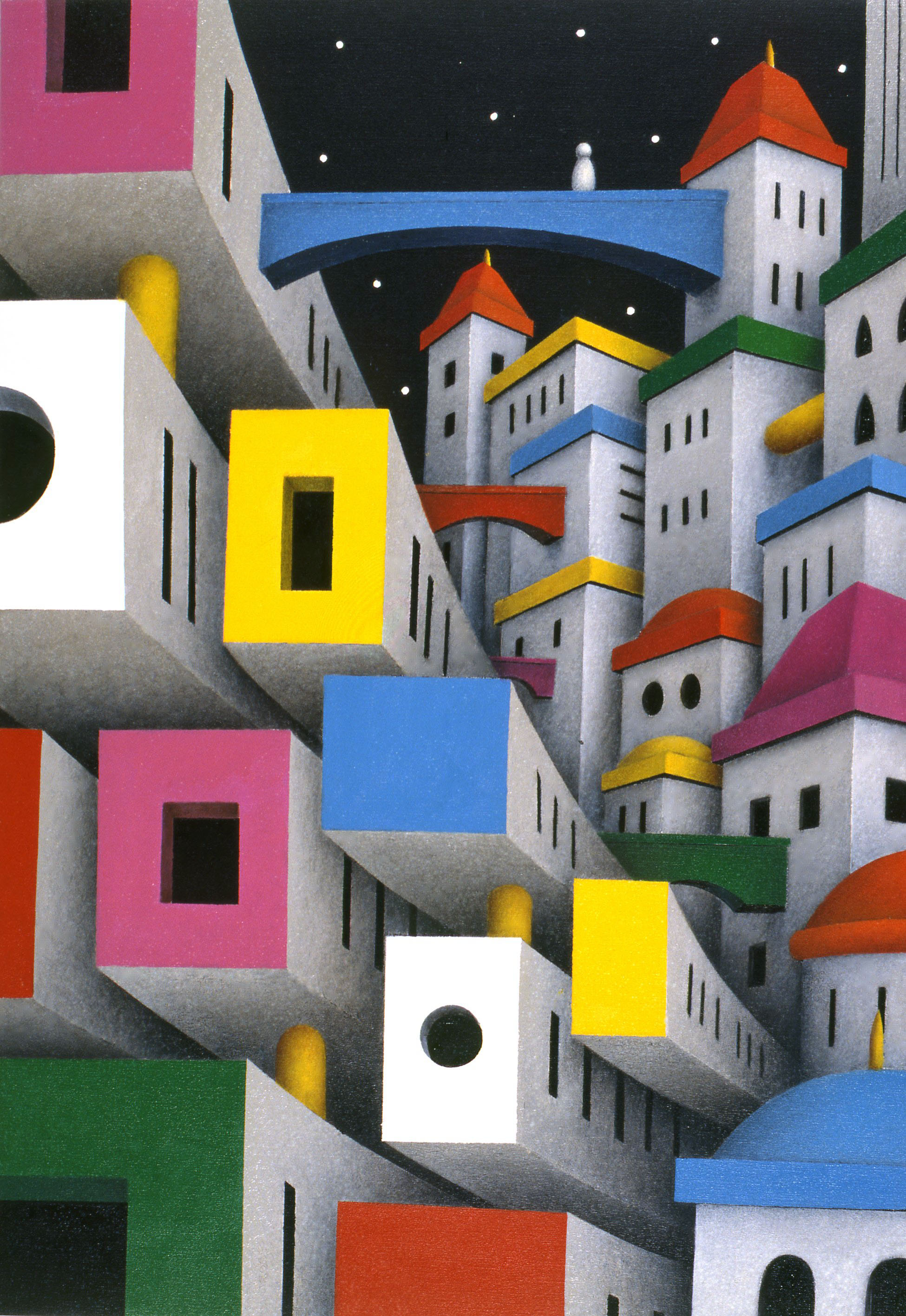
"Il luogo e l'altrove", Pier Augusto Breccia. Oil on canvas, cm70X100, 2010

Breccia's canvases are intensely populated by “objects”, all apparently located at the ‘right place’ not for one objective reason (i.e. the correct Cartesian three-dimensional metric) but by a harmonious balance of forms and colours. Yet, Breccia's objects have very little or no objectivity left, as they are deconstructed into essential forms/colours or become “space itself” or “something other than itself”. This process of de-objectification transforms objects into languages, signs or “ciphers” (as defined by Karl Jaspers) open to endless and free interpretations.

The use of the light and the chiaroscuro parallels that of the space and the perspective in the multitude of paradoxes. Never in Breccia's paintings one can find a well-defined source of light; yet the chiaroscuro seems perfectly executed and the abundance of light is such that even the distinctive starry night skies are bright (Breccia's painting techniques manipulates the texture of the paint to produce light by reflecting or absorbing the physical light).

The absence of a light source from within the space of the canvas contributes to ‘clean’ the space of any emotional content. One could say that Breccia's paintings `do not have a mood’. This means that the paintings do not establish private connections with the viewer, who might have, or who might be experiencing some particular mood. Furthermore, whilst an objective light would guide towards a particular point of the canvas and suggest a particular (subjective) point of view, or obscure what the artist senses as unknown or mysterious, the diffused brightness of Breccia's paintings leaves the viewer free from the subjective vision of the artist.

If, generally, light is associated with what is rationally comprehensible, such as the “light of reason”, in Breccia's space everything appears both bright and mysterious. On one hand, the painting invites the viewer to explore the space with the eye of reason, yet on the other hand, the painting evokes the mystery with full brightness, as an opening towards all possible reasons and metrics of space.

When the works of Breccia go under the lens of pure reason, reason itself ends up evaporating in a cloud of paradoxes, making the immeasurable incomprehensible and renewing the mystery. And it is precisely the immunity of mystery to the assaults of reason, that triggers the one very emotion that Breccia's paintings evoke: “wonder”.

== Hermeneutic painting ==
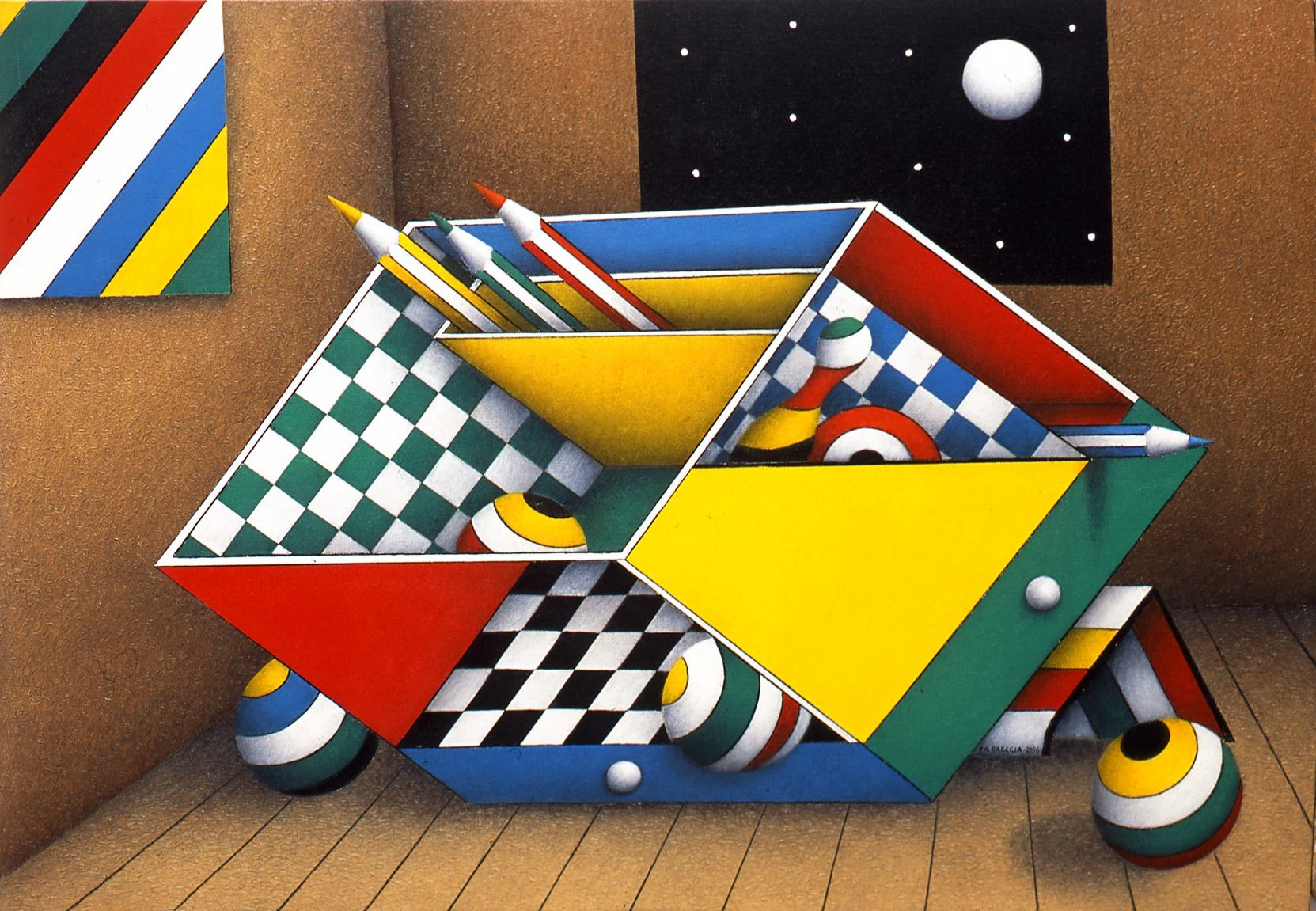
"Art box", Pier Augusto Breccia. Oil on canvas, cm100X70, 2006

Breccia has used the term “Hermeneutic art” to describe his position as an artist in his manifesto “Introduction to Hermeneutic Painting” (2004). “Hermeneutic art” refers to the creative process of the artist who:

[…] must do little more than open himself to his own signifiable figure having wiped out every sort of rational and sensual conditioning; having emptied, i.e., the mind of every cultural intentionality and the heart of any emotional presence that is not linked to the irrepressible urge to experience once more the immense moment of "know thyself".

— Pier Augusto Breccia, "Introduction to Hermeneutic Painting", 2004

Hermeneutic painting does not illustrate emotions or propose meanings, concepts, visions or what we already know of our self. The hermeneutic artist as well as the viewer can find in art an ontological value, simply put by Breccia:

I paint what I don’t know about myself.

— Pier Augusto Breccia, Interview, "RAI, Uno Mattina", 2004, , 2004

Thus, like a scientist such as an astronomer, who points his telescope towards an unknown part of the sky to reveal new stars or other celestial bodies, hermeneutic art is a way to know, where the ‘object’ of knowledge is the subject itself. Somewhat like the astronomer's telescope, the hermeneutic artwork is open on “one side to the endless otherness of being or God, and on the other side to the personal consciousness of the ‘I’.”(Introduction to Hermeneutic Painting, 2004). In this context, the language of art has an extremely empowering task:

to become [a] vehicle of new possible paradigms, personally universal, for which the consciousness of contemporary man seems to have an extreme and urgent need in order to get out of a demolitive nihilism perhaps even more insistently dogmatic, in pronouncing its "No's", than the metaphysical dogmatism that it was intended to fight.

— Pier Augusto Breccia, Introduction to Hermeneutic Painting, 2004
