= Fredriksberg, Sweden =

Fredriksberg
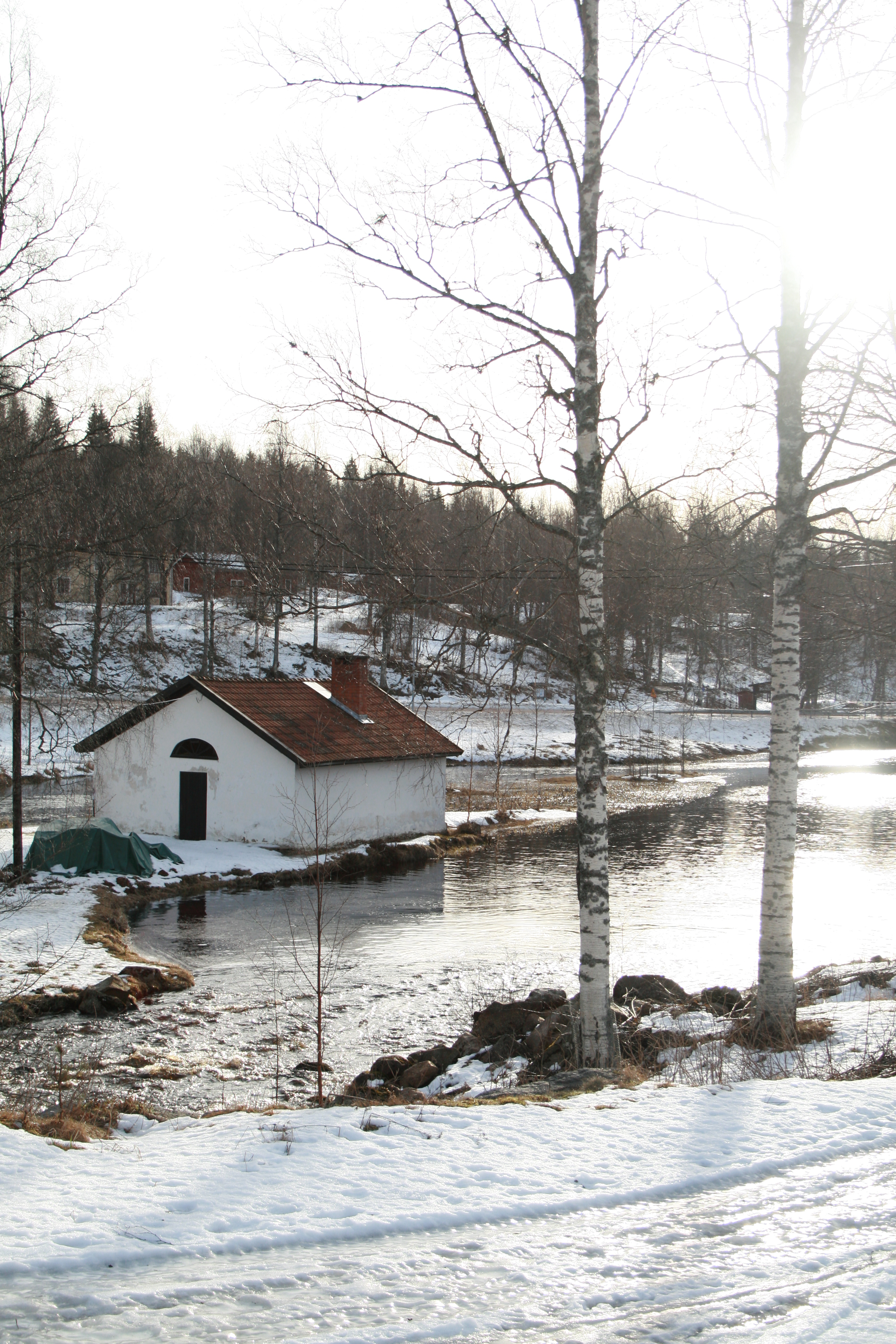
- Old forge in the eastern part of Fredriksberg

- Coat of arms

- Location within Dalarna Location within Sweden
- Coordinates: 60°08′25″N 14°22′20″E
- Country: Sweden
- Province: Dalarna
- County: Dalarna County
- Municipality: Ludvika Municipality

Area
  - Total: 1.76 km^{2} (0.68 sq mi)

Population (31 December 2010)
  - Total: 655
  - Density: 371/km^{2} (960/sq mi)
- Time zone: UTC+1 (CET)
  - Summer (DST): UTC+2 (CEST)

Fredriksberg (sometimes referred to as Säfsen or Säfsnäs, because of the nearby tourism facility or the parish and old municipality names) is a locality situated in Ludvika Municipality, Dalarna County, Sweden with 655 inhabitants in 2010.

Fredriksberg, located about 60 km west of the municipality seat in Ludvika, is the demographic and commercial centre of the western part of the municipality, and hosts some parts of the municipal administration. Fredriksberg is centrally situated in western Svealand, close to the border between Dalecarlia and Värmland, with most larger towns and cities in the region, such as Borlänge, Karlstad, Örebro, Falun, Karlskoga and Mora on a distance of between 80 and 130 kilometres (50 and 80 mi).

Fredriksberg was founded during the 18th century as an industrial society, and heavy industries, mainly focused on iron ore and forest processing, did for a long period of time play an important role in the town. The surroundings of Fredriksberg is dominated by a beautiful landscape of wilderness, great forests and lakes. Being one of the most popular destination for foreign visitors to Sweden, the tourism today stands for the main economic revenue for the town. The townscape of Fredriksberg still today carries many remains of older industrial epochs, which has made the town to a popular target for urban exploration.

== History ==
The surroundings of Fredriksberg is counted as inhabited since the 17th century. The first settlers were Finnish immigrants who conducted svedjebruk (a type of slash and burn), why the lands came to be called finnmarker (English translation: land of the Finns).

Fredriksberg was to be founded in 1729 as an industrial town, following the Industrial Revolution, when an ironworks were set up by Sebastian Grave at the southern end of Lake Säfssjön, close west to the forest finn village in Säfsbyn (which today essentially is a part of Fredriksberg). The limits of today's urban area would also include the Annefors ironworks, founded in 1736. The name Fredriksberg was chosen in honor of the king, Frederick I of Sweden.

=== The 19th century ===
During both the 18th and the 19th century the iron operations were dominating the economy in the area. Smelteries and trip hammers were built on several locations, not only in Fredriksberg but also in Ulriksberg, Tyfors, Strömsdal and Gravendal, whereas the latter later would become the main actor in the area.

However, during the 19th century the forest processing came to play an increasingly bigger role as one of the town's main industries and a number of sawmills were built in the surroundings of Fredriksberg. In today's Fredriksberg, Annefors became the main industrial district, a position it would keep until the late 20th century.

=== The 20th century ===
During the second half of the 19th century the iron industry gradually came to lose its dominant position in Bergslagen, to be replaced by the forest industry. In Fredriksberg a sulfite factory, for usage in paper production, was constructed by the Gravendal Industries (swedish: Gravendalsverken) in 1897. This factory's rise and fall came to play the main role in the town's 20th-century history. In Fredriksberg a limestone mine was also reopened, whose production went directly to the sulfite production.

==== 1910–1957 ====
The sulfite factory was in 1910 supplemented with a sulfate factory. But already by 1916 the Gravendal Industries were overtaken by Hellefors AB (by this time a major player in central Sweden), which by that became the owner of the factories in Fredriksberg. However, financial problems made Hellefors forced to be taken over by the government, and the industries in Fredriksberg became state owned.

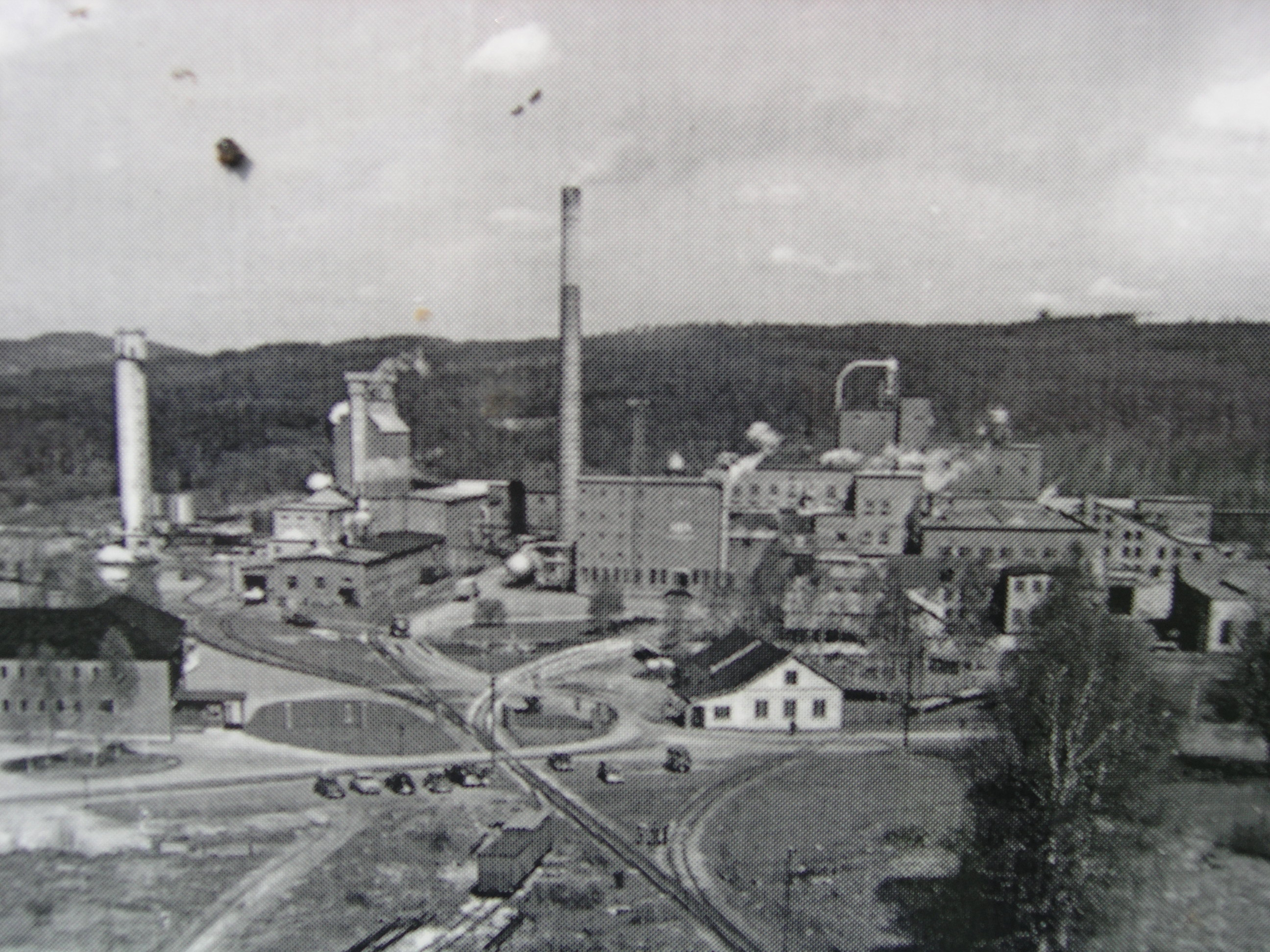
The paper mill in Fredriksberg during its heyday, in the mid-20th century.

During the 1930s and '40s the factories returned to private ownership and were transformed into a full scale paper mill. As a result of the Swedish neutrality in World War II and the following lack of foreign competition and the Swedish economic boom during the 1940s and '50s the paper mill in Fredriksberg got a stronger economic position. This time could in many ways be described as Fredriksberg's industrial golden age. The town's population culminated during the epoch with about 2,000 inhabitants, and the economy was good.

Fredriksberg had already since 1875 a railway connection with Hörken on Bergslagsbanan (the so-called Säfsbanan), but came from 1931 (when a line to Hällefors was opened) to 1940 (when the line to Hörken was discontinued) to be the centre of the narrow gauge 802 mm (2 ft 7.6 in) railway network between Hällefors, Hörken and Neva on Inlandsbanan.

==== 1957–1972 ====
1957 the Hellefors group was acquired by Billerud AB, and the paper mill in Fredriksberg became one of the company's smaller units. When the Swedish economy boom following the end of World War II started to come to an end in the beginning of the 1960s the competition got tougher and economies of scale made smaller units such as the one in Fredriksberg unprofitable as investment objects. The employment rate in the town decreased already in 1964, which made Fredriksberg a target for regional policies, in 1966 the Dalarna County council opened a laundry in the town.

The recession continued and by 1971–72 Billerud ceased their operations at the Fredriksberg paper mill. The railway to Hällefors had been replaced by truck transports by 1970 and the rails were lifted shortly after. The railway traffic westbound, towards Neva on Inlandsbanan had been discontinued already by the end of 1963. Fredriksberg were until 1970 the seat of the former Säfsnäs Municipality, which by 1971 merged with Grangärde Municipality and Ludvika town council to form the new Ludvika Municipality.

==== 1972 and onwards ====
Billerud sold the factory buildings to Lesjöfors AB already in 1968. Different sorts of replacement industries were created with help of state subsidies both by Lesjöfors and other companies during the decade after the closure of the paper mill, amongst other things wallpapers, wooden shelves and automotive springs were produced before Lesjöfors AB went bankrupt in 1985. The following year automotive springs were produced in a labour-owned industry, which didn't manage the competition either. This came to be the last operations in the former paper mill. Since 1994 the factory buildings lack legal owners.

During the 1980s the Billerud group came to be acquired by Stora Kopparberg, and as a result the forest management moved from Fredriksberg. The county-council-owned laundry were sold by 1998 to the Danish Berendsen group, and were closen in 2003 when the company chose to centralize its Swedish operations to Eskilstuna.

Since the record years during the 1950s Fredriksberg has experienced a drastic population decrease, as a cause of unemployment, urbanisation and strongly streamlined heavy industries. At the same time the town has experienced an increasing number of tourist visits. Cottages and an alpine skiing resort were created in Säfsbyn just east of the town in 1979, as a facility mainly owned labour union interests. This later came to be the private company that runs today's Säfsen Resort.

It has hosted a stage of the Swedish rally.

== Riksdag elections ==
Year	%	Votes	V	S	MP	C	L	KD	M	SD	NyD	Left	Right
1973	88.9	1,096	6.2	76.6		10.7	2.2	2.5	1.6			82.8	14.5
1976	85.7	996	4.4	80.6		8.5	2.7	1.4	2.2			85.0	13.5
1979	86.4	996	2.8	80.1		8.4	2.4	2.0	3.7			82.9	14.6
1982	92.1	1,035	4.1	80.4	0.8	6.2	2.8	1.4	4.3			84.4	13.3
1985	90.2	985	5.7	82.3	0.7	4.7	2.9		3.7			88.0	11.3
1988	88.0	883	7.4	78.7	3.1	3.3	3.1	2.0	2.4			89.1	8.7
1991	85.9	843	8.2	71.9	2.1	2.3	3.7	3.9	3.9		3.9	80.1	13.8
1994	86.1	805	8.3	79.3	3.0	2.2	1.5	1.1	4.1		0.2	90.6	8.9
1998	79.2	709	23.1	64.7	2.3	1.1	0.7	3.2	4.7			90.1	9.7
2002	78.8	648	17.9	65.9	1.7	3.7	2.8	2.6	4.2	0.8		85.5	13.3
2006	74.2	575	10.3	68.2	1.0	4.3	1.7	2.1	8.2	1.6		79.5	16.3
2010	85.9	639	13.0	63.5	2.2	2.8	2.7	1.9	9.4	4.1		78.7	16.7
2014	86.3	591	12.5	59.6	1.2	3.4	1.2	0.7	7.1	13.5		73.3	12.4
2018	85.9	574	12.7	54.2	0.9	5.9	0.2	3.0	5.2	16.6		73.7	24.9

== Townscape ==
Fredriksberg today has a townscape where remains of several different historical epochs still play significant roles. The town is dominated by villa neighbourhoods and smaller apartment houses, most dating from the mid-20th century. Fredriksberg in by largely built up around water and a system of three lakes with regulated streams characterizes many parts of the town.

=== The western parts ===
The western districts around Annefors is dominated by the factory buildings which for a long time formed Fredriksberg's economic backbone. The large buildings are today derelict, but is still an interesting recent historic site, and is therefore subject to significant urban exploration. The area is highly polluted, and because of the lack of legal owners the remediation has become responsibility to the state. Länsstyrelsen is currently making a survey of the pollutes in order to remediate the area. There are plans on transforming the old industrial district into a golf course. Palmheden, a district in the westernmost part of the town hosts a recycling facility as well as the sewage treatment plant.

=== The central and southern parts ===
Fredriksberg's central districts consists of shops, other commercial buildings and smaller apartment houses. This is Fredriksberg's commercial centre with restaurant, stores, petrol station, library etc. The central parts of the town also hosts the sports ground of Fredriksberg (where Säfsnäs IF plays their home games in football), the main bus terminal, a medical clinic, Folkets hus with cinema, rescue service and fire station.

The southern parts of the town consists mainly out of today's industrial district, with numerous smaller companies and the County Council-owned laundry (which reopened by the beginning of 2009). Also some areas with villa neighbourhoods, referred to as Nedre Egnahem, can be counted to the southern parts of the town. Close south of the town is also a bathing place.

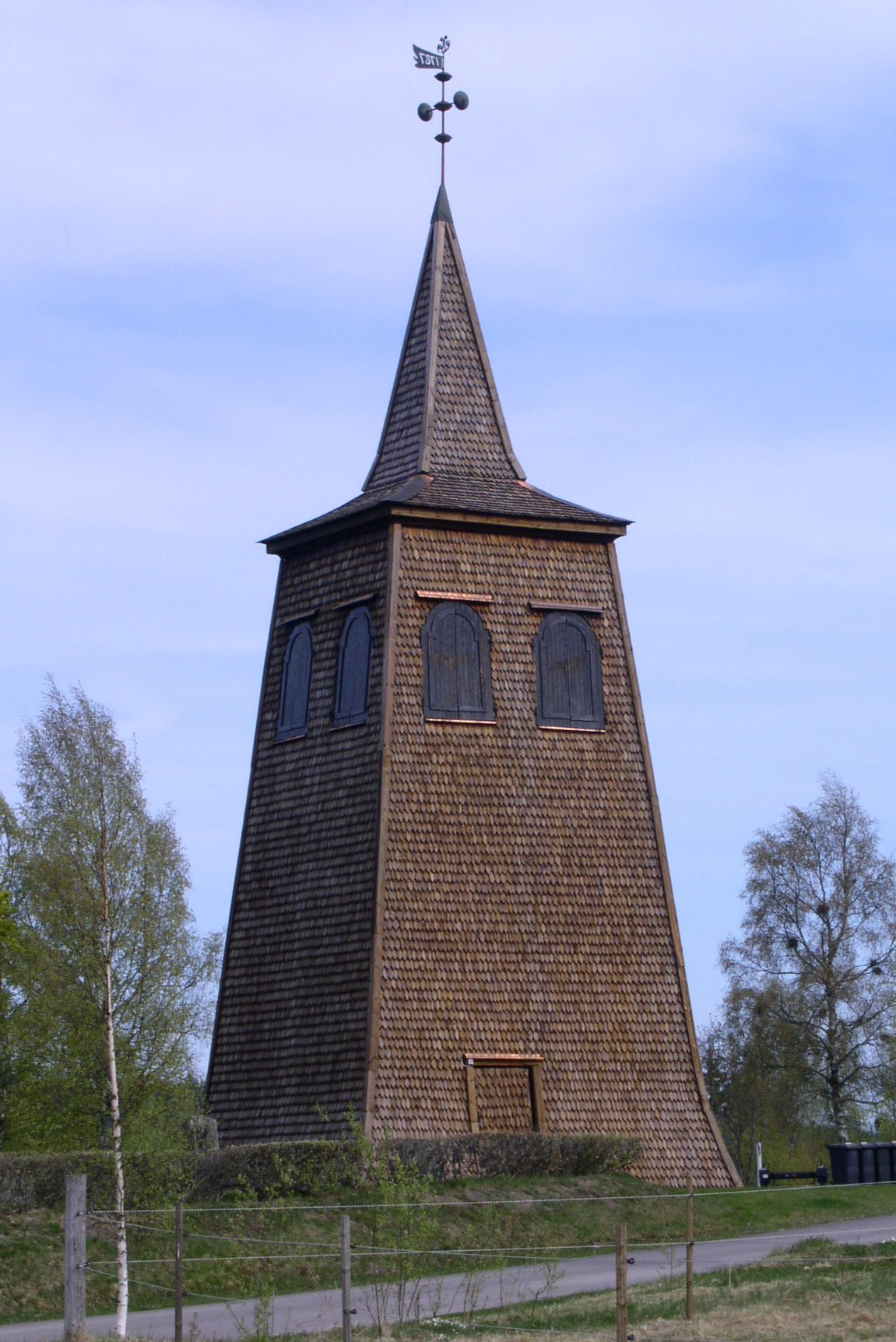
Campanile at the Säfsnäs church

=== The northern and eastern parts ===
The northern and eastern districts of the town, which mostly consist of the districts Övre Egnahem and Skarpa, is dominated by villa neighbourhoods and some remains of the original Fredriksberg ironworks by the southern end of Lake Säfssjöns. There is also a memorial of the town's founder Sebastian Grave, a building museum by the local history association as well as the Fredriksberg Mansion, built in the 18th century. On Skarpa, one of the eastern districts, is the Fredriksberg school with classes in both junior-level and senior-level located.

=== Säfsbyn ===
Säfsbyn, or Säfsen, the seasonal area which today essentially, though not statistically, makes up the easternmost part of Fredriksberg is dominated by the Säfsen Resort tourism facility, which also is the largest employer in Fredriksberg. The Säfsen Resort alpine skiing facility with 16 pistes by Mount Solberget close southeast of the district is also a popular tourist destination. Säfsbyn were originally a forest finn village and is older than the town of Fredriksberg. In Säfsbyn is also Säfsnäs church, built in 1762, located.
