= Håksberg =

- Location within Dalarna Location within Sweden
- Coordinates: 60°11′N 15°12′E
- Country: Sweden
- Province: Dalarna
- County: Dalarna County
- Municipality: Ludvika Municipality

Area
  - Total: 0.86 km^{2} (0.33 sq mi)

Population (31 December 2010)
  - Total: 458
  - Density: 531/km^{2} (1,380/sq mi)
- Time zone: UTC+1 (CET)
  - Summer (DST): UTC+2 (CEST)

Håksberg is a locality situated in Ludvika Municipality, Dalarna County, Sweden with 458 inhabitants in 2010.
