= Gonäs =

- Location within Dalarna Location within Sweden
- Coordinates: 60°09′N 15°06′E
- Country: Sweden
- Province: Dalarna
- County: Dalarna County
- Municipality: Ludvika Municipality

Area
  - Total: 1.03 km^{2} (0.40 sq mi)

Population (31 December 2010)
  - Total: 357
  - Density: 345/km^{2} (890/sq mi)
- Time zone: UTC+1 (CET)
  - Summer (DST): UTC+2 (CEST)

Gonäs is a locality situated in Ludvika Municipality, Dalarna County, Sweden with 357 inhabitants in 2010.
