= Björk–Shiley valve =

Artificial heart valve

- Discontinued tilting-disc artificial heart valve
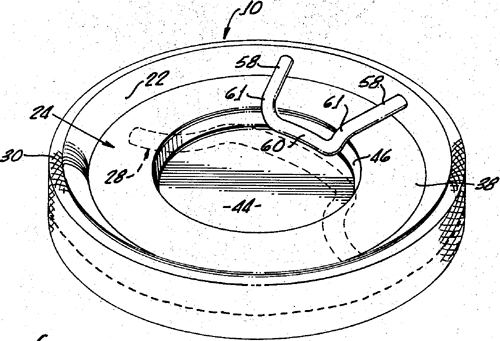
- Björk–Shiley valve, as depicted in patent #US003824629
- Specialty: Cardiothoracic surgery
- Uses: To replace malfunctioning aortic and mitral valves
- Complications: Fractures in a component leading to catastrophic failure and sudden death
- Approach: Open-heart surgery
- [edit on Wikidata]

The Björk–Shiley valve is a mechanical artificial heart valve. The valve was co-invented by American engineer Donald Shiley and Swedish heart surgeon Viking Björk.

Beginning in 1971, it has been used to replace aortic valves and mitral valves. It was the first successful tilting-disc valve. It was manufactured first by Shiley Laboratories, then later by Pfizer after that company purchased Shiley. One model of the Björk–Shiley valve became the subject of a famous lawsuit and recall after it was shown to malfunction.

== Construction ==
The Björk–Shiley valve consists of a single carbon-coated disc in a metal housing. The disc is held in place by two metal struts, an inflow and an outflow strut. The housing is made from the alloy Haynes 25, which is composed of 51% cobalt, 20% chromium, 15% tungsten, and 10% nickel. The Björk–Shiley valve was considered very durable and was widely used in the 1970s. However, later research indicated it was susceptible to long-term wear problems, and could shed microscopic metal fragments.

== Convexo-concave valve defects ==
Attempts to improve the design of the valve and speed manufacturing, however, led to a weaker structure, with serious consequences. Beginning in 1979, Björk–Shiley valves with the convexo-concave design had a tendency to develop fractures in the outflow strut which could result in catastrophic valve failure and possibly sudden cardiac death. Later analysis revealed that the strut was fracturing at the place where it was welded onto the metal valve ring. One end of the strut would fracture first, followed by the second strut some months later. Eventually, 619 of the 80,000 convexo-concave valves implanted fractured in this way, with the patient dying in two-thirds of those cases. The FDA withdrew approval of the convexo-concave valve in 1986. Valves welded by specific welders were at greater risk of fracture.

The convexo-concave valve was withdrawn from the market and multiple lawsuits were filed.

In 1992, Pfizer (Shiley's parent company) and patients with defective valves agreed to a settlement, with Pfizer proposing a fund of $80 million to $130 million in compensation, and to set aside $75 million for research to identify recipients of heart valves with a significant risk of fracture. The eventual settlement totaled $215 million. A separate part of the agreement required Pfizer to provide up to $300 million for patient or survivor claims in the event of valve fractures.

Not all of these valves have been removed and replaced. The risk of valve fracture has been balanced against the risk of the surgery to replace the valve. Decision tools have been published and are available from a trust set up for this purpose during the litigation surrounding the valve "recall". The tools take into account patient age, the size and location of the valve (aortic or mitral) and other factors to come up with a recommendation as to whether surgery to replace the valve is worthwhile. In some patients the risk of surgery to replace the valve is higher than the risk of the valve fracturing. A fund was also established for patient compensation and to pay for the costs of heart surgery to replace the valve.
