= Gravendal =

Coordinates: 60°2′N 14°30′E

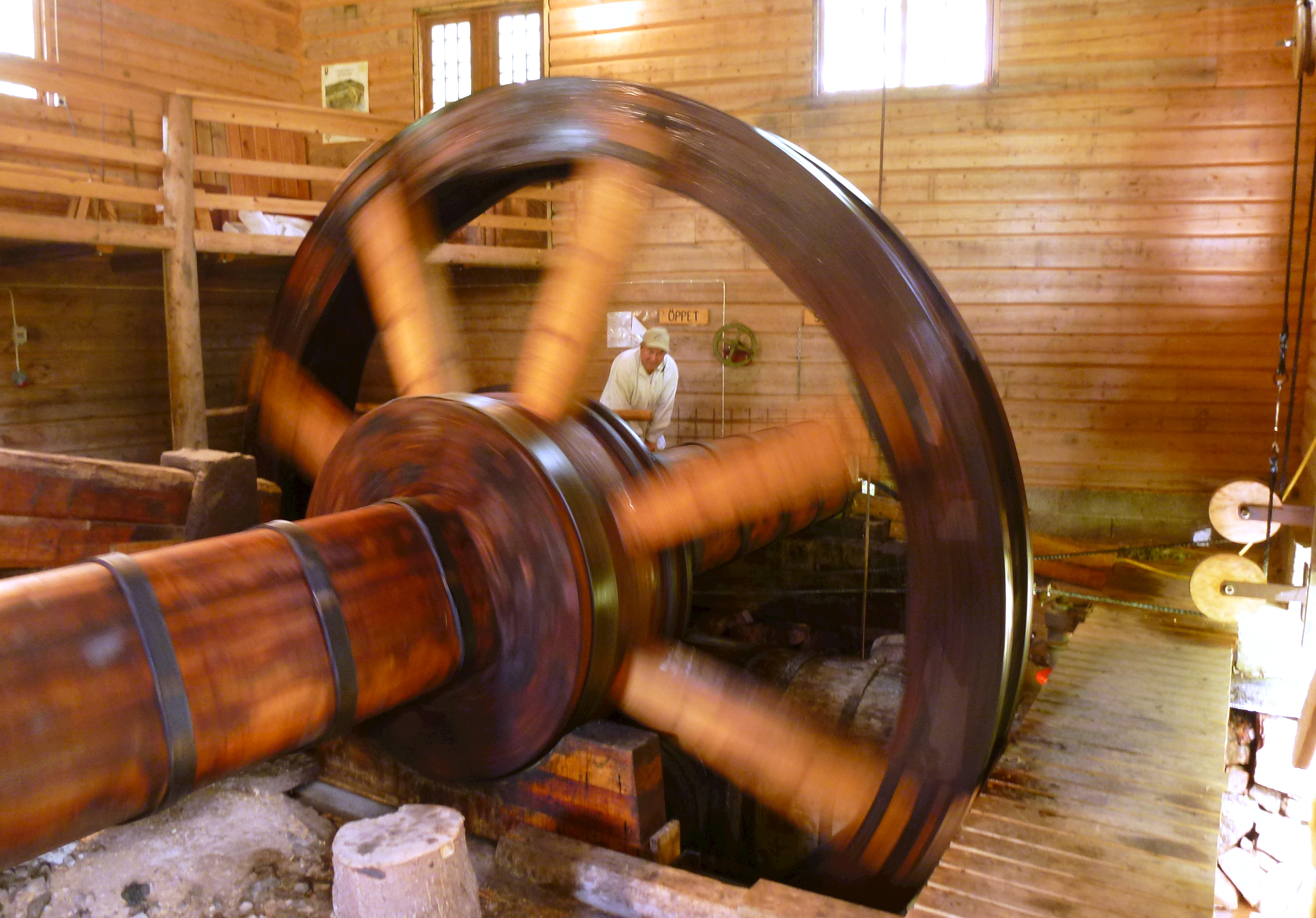
Gravendals handrail

Gravendal (Swedish pronunciation: [ɡravɛnˈdɑːl]) a minor locality in Ludvika Municipality, Dalarna County, Sweden with a population of about 40.

== History ==
Gravendal was founded by Sebastian Grave (1684–1748) in 1720 to meet the rising demand for Lumber. Reaching a peak activity between 1881 and 1909. Located at the site was a saw, mill, trip hammer, sheetmetal smithy and nail smithy. Gravendal became among other things, known for the horseshoes forged there.

== Trivia ==
Gravendal has given its name to one of Sweden's best-selling cider produced by Spendrups brewery.
