= Kolbäcksån =

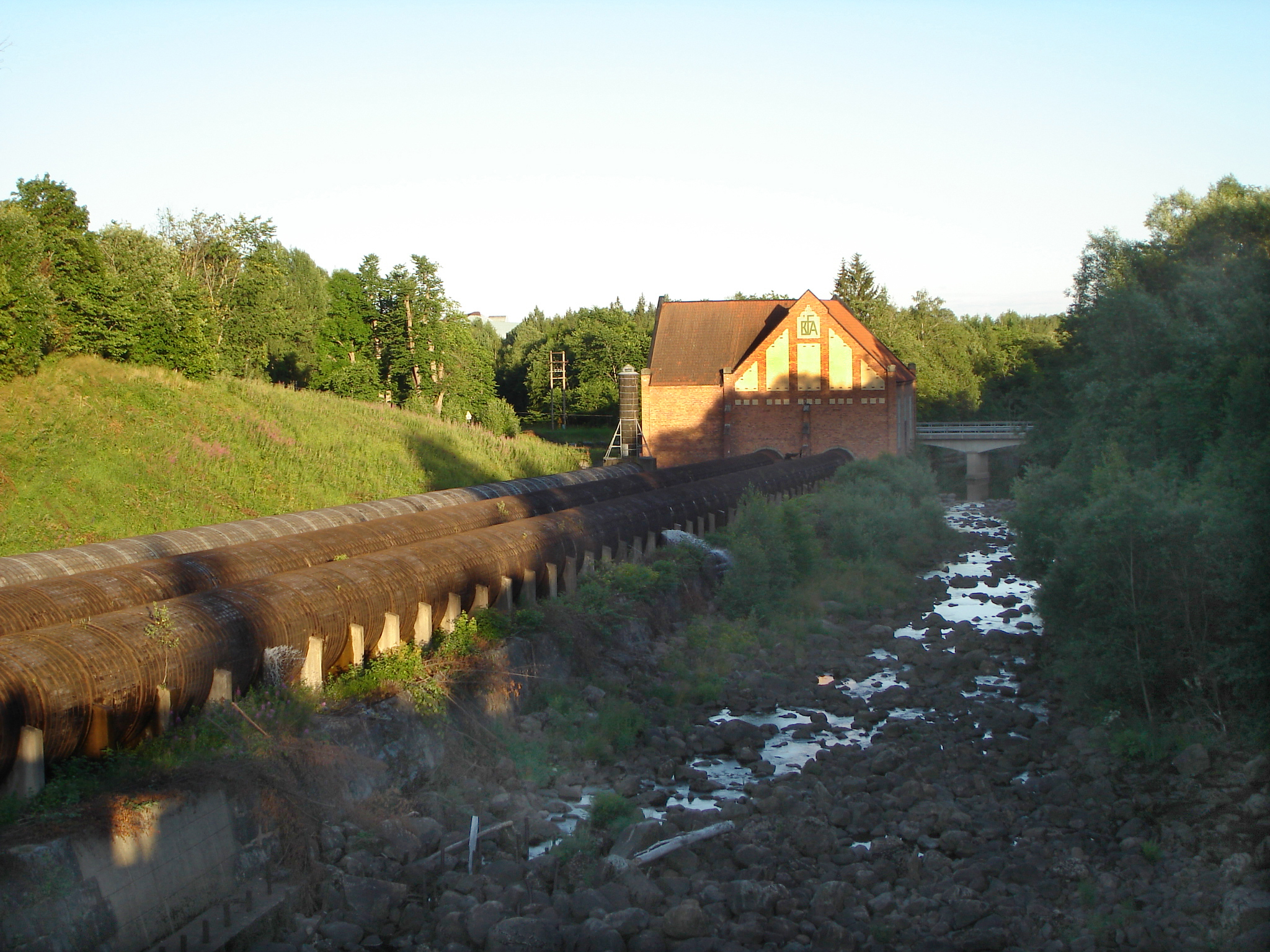

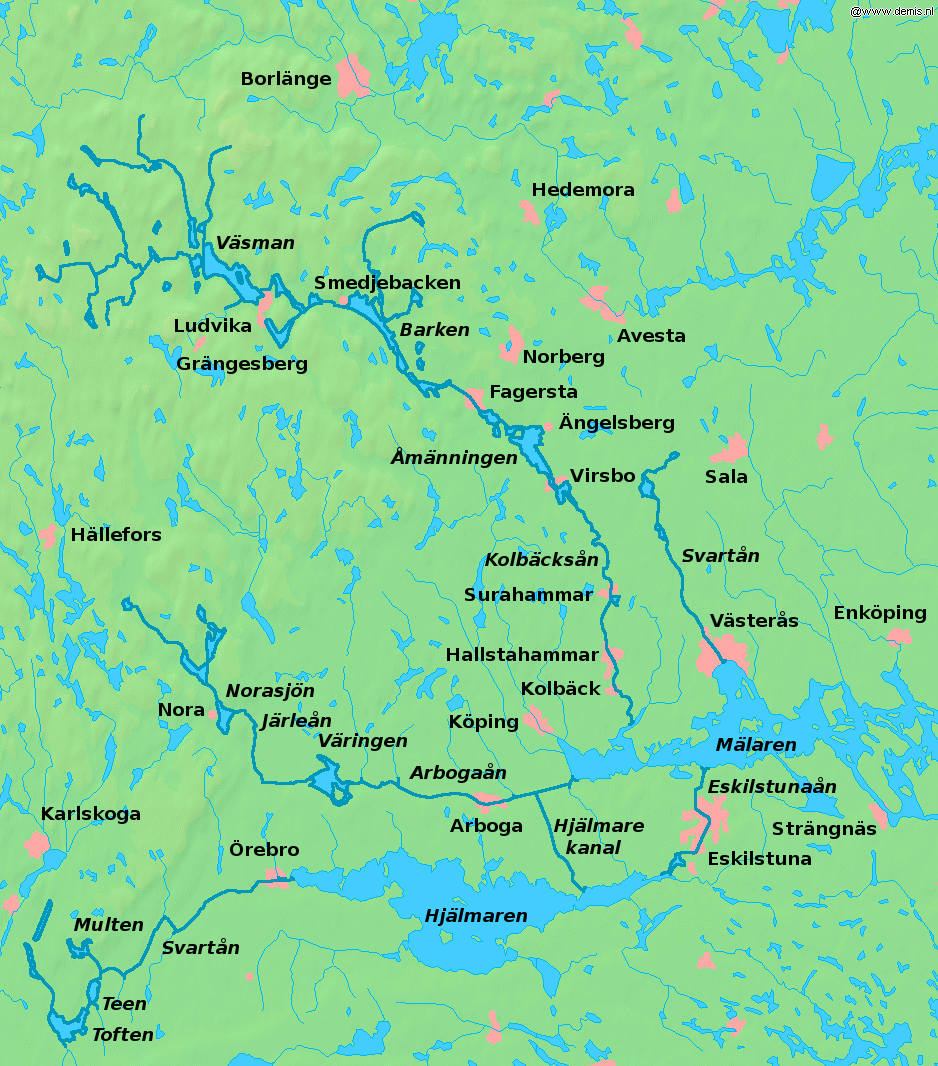
- Kolbäcksån flows from Lake Väsman at Ludvika towards Kolbäck and lake Mälaren.

Location
- Country: Sweden

Physical characteristics
- Mouth: Mälaren
  - coordinates: 59°30′30″N 16°15′30″E
- Length: 180 km (110 mi)
- Basin size: 3,100 km^{2} (1,200 sq mi)
- Discharge
  - average: 27 m^{3}/s (950 cu ft/s)

Kolbäcksån is a river located in Bergslagen in the middle of Sweden. It is about 180 kilometres long, arises in the province Dalarna and flows through the province of Västmanland into the Mälaren. The river drains an area of approximately 3,100 km^{2} and has an average discharge of 27 m^{3}/s. The city of Fagersta lies on the river and the Strömsholm Canal follows the river about 100 kilometres.
