= Saxdalen =

- Location within Dalarna Location within Sweden
- Coordinates: 60°08′N 14°58′E
- Country: Sweden
- Province: Dalarna
- County: Dalarna County
- Municipality: Ludvika Municipality

Area
  - Total: 1.75 km^{2} (0.68 sq mi)

Population (31 December 2010)
  - Total: 604
  - Density: 345/km^{2} (890/sq mi)
- Time zone: UTC+1 (CET)
  - Summer (DST): UTC+2 (CEST)

Saxdalen is a locality situated in Ludvika Municipality, Dalarna County, Sweden with 604 inhabitants in 2010.

== Riksdag elections ==
Year	%	Votes	V	S	MP	C	L	KD	M	SD	NyD	Left	Right
1973	80.6	649	14.9	53.0		25.3	2.0	0.5	3.4			68.0	30.7
1976	82.1	679	10.8	54.1		26.2	4.6	0.6	2.8			64.8	33.6
1979	80.6	661	14.5	56.3		19.1	3.9	0.8	3.9			70.8	26.9
1982	86.3	687	12.7	60.6	2.3	15.6	1.7	0.4	6.7			73.2	24.0
1985	85.6	663	14.0	58.5		12.8	5.0		6.8			72.5	24.6
1988	82.0	637	13.5	56.4	6.3	11.9	4.1	1.7	6.1			76.1	22.1
1991	79.5	602	10.6	53.2	2.3	9.0	2.7	3.7	7.6		8.8	63.8	22.9
1994	85.0	637	13.7	60.6	6.9	7.4	2.4	1.4	6.0		0.8	81.2	17.1
1998	78.5	559	29.9	44.0	4.5	3.8	2.3	7.0	7.2			78.4	20.2
2002	75.1	530	18.3	54.0	4.5	5.1	5.7	5.3	5.8	0.8		76.8	21.9
2006	78.5	554	13.7	50.2	1.8	7.8	2.2	3.8	12.6	4.7		65.7	26.4
2010	79.9	564	12.1	45.2	3.9	3.5	5.7	1.6	14.7	12.6		61.2	25.5
2014	86.6	608	9.7	38.8	3.6	4.1	1.8	0.2	10.0	28.8		52.1	16.1
2018	88.8	638	8.5	29.3	2.7	7.7	3.0	4.7	9.1	33.1		48.1	49.8
