= Donald Shiley =

American heart valve inventor (1920–2010)

Donald P. Shiley
- Born: Donald Pearce Shiley; January 19, 1920
- Died: July 31, 2010 (aged 90)
- Occupation: biomedical engineering
- Spouse: Patricia Carol Dilworth (-1974) Darlene Marcos (1987)

Donald Pearce Shiley (January 19, 1920 – July 31, 2010) was the inventor of the Bjork–Shiley valve, a prosthetic heart valve. He was a 1951 alumnus of the University of Portland, where he studied engineering.

== Early life ==
He was born in Yakima, Washington, on January 19, 1920. His family was homesteaders, and followed the fruit harvest; he joined his brothers at harvest time through the years of the Great Depression, but quickly learned that his interest and skill were in “fixing things” on the farm. He said that “I liked machines. I liked the way they are ideas that get built.“

Shiley attended Oregon State University, the Land-grant university in Oregon, on a scholarship, but left to join the Navy for service in World War II. After the war, he enrolled at the University of Portland, a private Roman Catholic institution, using the G.I. Bill benefits to study engineering and chemistry. In 1951, he graduated first in his class.

== Career ==
Shiley began working at Edwards Laboratories, located in Orange County, California, south of Los Angeles, the first manufacturer of artificial heart-valves.

Later he established his own company, Shiley Laboratories, in the same area. His first valve was developed together with the American heart-surgeon Kay, and was the first disc heart-valve. Compared with the Edwards valve, which had the shape of a little ball, the disc valve needed much less space within the heart when implanted.

Some years later, Shiley improved his design in cooperation with Swedish heart surgeon Viking Björk, which led to the first tilting disc heart-valve, resulting in a much better flow of blood through the valve.

Shiley Labs developed and manufactured other products, especially tracheal and endotracheal tubes for respiration after surgery in the mouth or throat, and during anesthesia.

The Björk–Shiley heart valve underwent several improvements in the following years, primarily in the degree of opening of the disc, thus reducing turbulence in the bloodstream.

Some years later, Shiley decided to sell his company to Pfizer, and retired.

== Personal life ==
Shiley was married twice: to Patricia Carol Dilworth Shiley, the mother of his four children and who died in middle-age; and to Darlene Marcos.

== Death ==
Shiley died on July 31, 2010, after deteriorating health. He is survived by his wife, Darlene Marcos, and four children and five grandchildren

== Legacy ==
In March 2007, the Shileys donated $12 million to the University of Portland, for renovating the University's School of Engineering. The grant was the largest the university had ever received. Shiley also made a donation to the University of San Diego for the Donald P. Shiley Center for Science and Technology. In 2012, Darlene Marcos Shiley donated $1 million to MASTERPIECE Trust, the PBS fund which supports the "Masterpiece" program series, when the Downton Abbey series brought increased interest in Masterpiece and after the fund had lost a major donor.
