= Sunnansjö =

- Location within Dalarna Location within Sweden
- Coordinates: 60°13′N 14°57′E
- Country: Sweden
- Province: Dalarna
- County: Dalarna County
- Municipality: Ludvika Municipality

Area
  - Total: 1.55 km^{2} (0.60 sq mi)

Population (31 December 2010)
  - Total: 560
  - Density: 360/km^{2} (930/sq mi)
- Time zone: UTC+1 (CET)
  - Summer (DST): UTC+2 (CEST)

Sunnansjö is a locality situated in Ludvika Municipality, Dalarna County, Sweden. It had 560 inhabitants in 2010.

== Notable residents ==
- Viking Björk (1918-2008), cardiac surgeon
