= Sörvik =

- Location within Dalarna Location within Sweden
- Coordinates: 60°11′N 15°09′E
- Country: Sweden
- Province: Dalarna
- County: Dalarna County
- Municipality: Ludvika Municipality

Area
  - Total: 1.36 km^{2} (0.53 sq mi)

Population (31 December 2010)
  - Total: 743
  - Density: 545/km^{2} (1,410/sq mi)
- Time zone: UTC+1 (CET)
  - Summer (DST): UTC+2 (CEST)

Sörvik is a locality situated in Ludvika Municipality, Dalarna County, Sweden with 743 inhabitants in 2010. It is on the east shore of Lake Väsman.

== Gallery ==
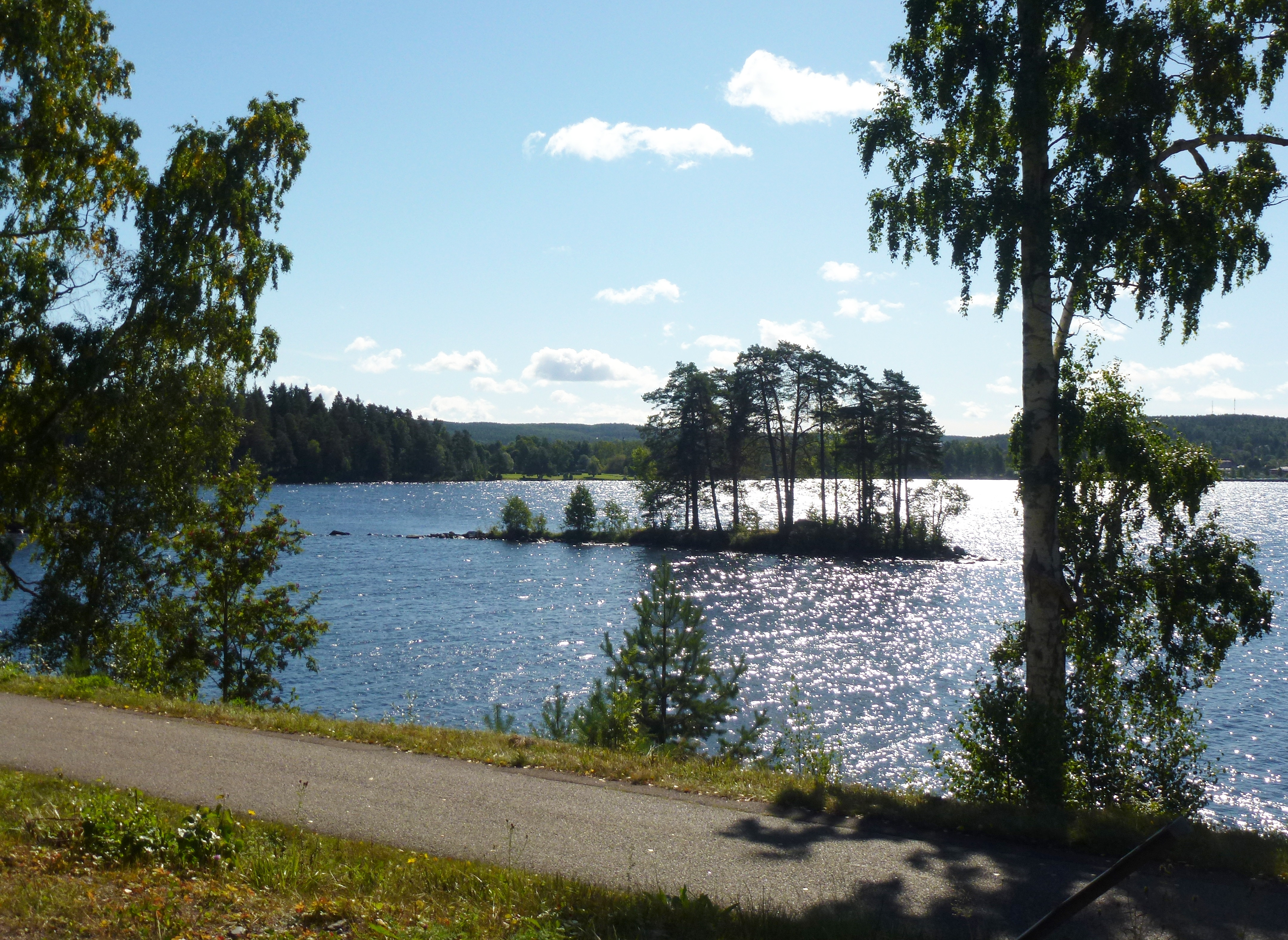
Lake Väsman at Sörvik with Kaffeholmen island

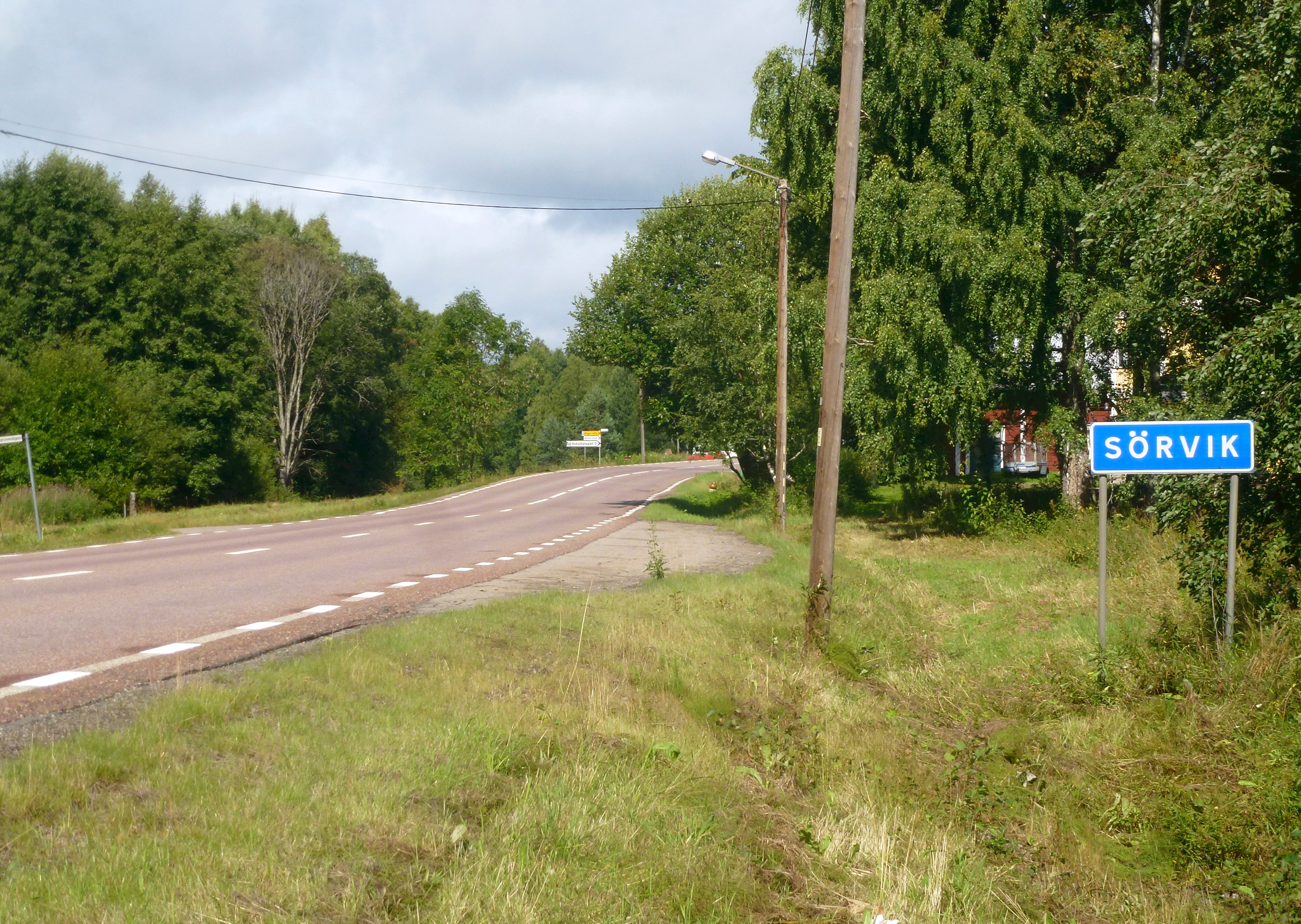
Sörvik from the south

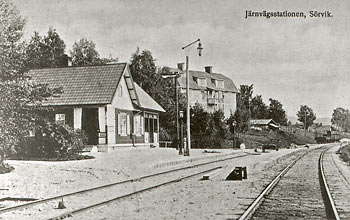
Sörviks station in 1914
