= Viking Björk =

Swedish cardiac surgeon

Viking Olov Björk (3 December 1918, in Sunnansjö, Dalarna – 18 February 2009) was a Swedish cardiac surgeon.

== Early life and education ==
Björk wrote his dissertation in 1948, titled "Brain perfusion in dogs with artificially oxygenated blood".

== Björk–Shiley valve ==
In 1968, he collaborated with American engineer Donald Shiley to develop the Björk–Shiley valve, a mechanical prosthetic heart valve. It was the first "tilting disc valve", used to replace the aortic or mitral valve. Many modifications followed, including the convexo-concave valve. The convexo-concave valve had defects in form of strut fractures. Therefore, the monostrut valve was introduced to prevent outflow strut fractures.

The Bjork–Shiley valve was manufactured by Pfizer after they bought the Shiley company in 1979. In 1980 Björk wrote to Pfizer threatening to publish cases of valve failures—often fatal to the patients—unless corrective action was taken. This eventually led to long lawsuit that involved the recall of all existing valves and Pfizer allocating up to US$20 million to pay compensation.

== Death ==
Björk died on 18 February 2009 in Stockholm.
