= Ludvika Municipality =

Ludvika Municipality Ludvika kommun
- Municipality
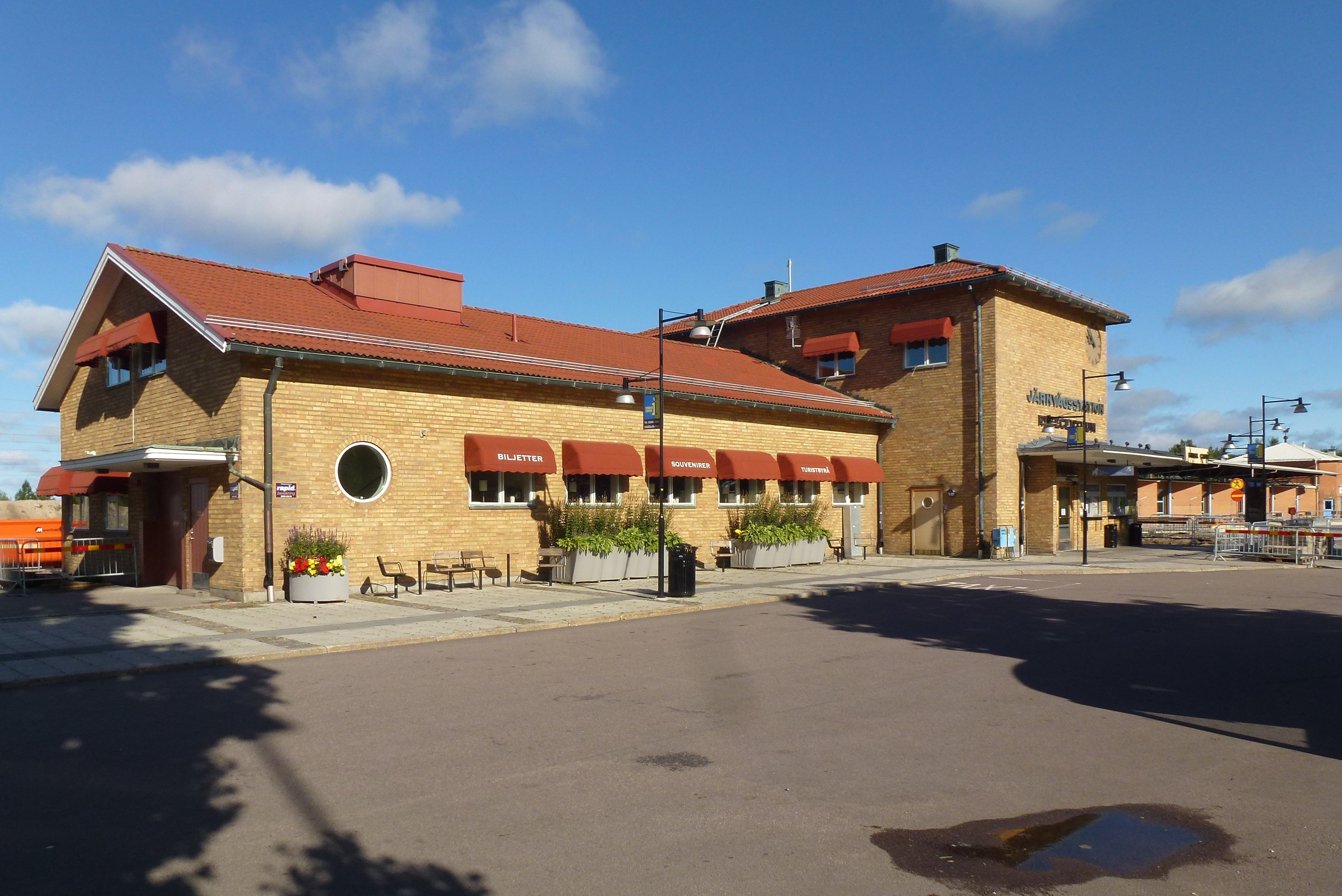
- Ludvika Railway Station

- Flag Coat of arms

- Coordinates: 60°08′N 15°11′E
- Country: Sweden
- County: Dalarna County
- Seat: Ludvika

Area
  - Total: 1,647.81 km^{2} (636.22 sq mi)
  - Land: 1,490.42 km^{2} (575.45 sq mi)
  - Water: 157.39 km^{2} (60.77 sq mi)
- Area as of 1 January 2014.

Population (30 June 2025)
  - Total: 26,781
  - Density: 17.969/km^{2} (46.539/sq mi)
- Time zone: UTC+1 (CET)
  - Summer (DST): UTC+2 (CEST)
- ISO 3166 code: SE
- Province: Dalarna
- Municipal code: 2085
- Website: www.ludvika.se
- Density is calculated using land area only.

Ludvika Municipality (Swedish: Ludvika kommun) is a municipality in Dalarna County, central Sweden. It has its seat in the town of Ludvika.

In 1971 the City of Ludvika (itself instituted as such in 1919) was amalgamated with the adjacent municipalities of Grangärde and Säfsnäs, forming the present entity.

== Localities ==
Figures as of 2004.

1. Ludvika 13,724
2. Grängesberg 3,356
3. Sunnansjö 758
4. Saxdalen 752
5. Fredriksberg 741
6. Nyhammar 682
7. Sörvik 540
8. Blötberget 529
9. Persbo/Gräsberg 459
10. Gonäs 432
11. Landforsen/Håksberg 438
12. Grangärde 374
- Other/countryside 2,967

== Economy ==
These were the largest employers in Ludvika in 2005:

1. Hitachi ABB Power Grids 2,400
2. County medical facilities 600
3. Spendrups brewery 285
4. VBU Västerbergslagens Utbildningscentrum 220
5. RSV Tax Office 110
6. Samhall-gruppen 80
7. GIA Industri AB 75
8. Brunnsviks folkhögskola 75
9. Connex Sverige AB 70
10. Seco Tools AB 70
11. ISS Cleaning 60

== Demographics ==
This is a demographic table based on Ludvika Municipality's electoral districts in the 2022 Swedish general election sourced from SVT's election platform, in turn taken from SCB official statistics.

In total there were 19,610 Swedish citizens of voting age resident in the municipality. 48.8 % voted for the left coalition and 49.8 % for the right coalition. Indicators are in percentage points except population totals and income.

Location	Residents	Citizen adults	Left vote	Right vote	Employed	Swedish parents	Foreign heritage	Income SEK	Degree
Location			%	%					
Björkås-Stallbacken	1,971	1,542	42.0	56.7	76	87	13	24,444	20
Blötberget-Gonäs	1,144	884	41.9	57.1	78	90	10	25,559	28
Fredriksberg	753	599	65.0	32.8	74	83	17	20,190	24
Högberget	1,597	1,070	52.6	46.4	77	70	30	26,692	47
Knutsbo	1,858	1,338	48.8	50.5	90	82	18	31,600	56
Kyrkbyn-Nyhammar	1,783	1,430	47.9	50.4	80	90	10	23,048	26
Lorentsberga	1,765	1,334	51.3	47.9	86	83	17	28,276	42
Ludvika gård	2,065	1,319	55.4	43.0	64	59	41	19,595	31
Ludvika Ulrika	2,266	1,664	49.0	50.3	73	71	29	22,487	35
Magneten	1,397	989	48.0	51.2	77	66	34	26,360	40
Marnäs	2,065	1,601	52.4	46.3	69	68	32	21,042	32
Näset	2,188	1,393	61.1	36.7	53	49	51	16,501	25
Sunnansjö-Saxdalen	1,929	1,561	40.0	58.6	81	92	8	23,389	26
Sörvik-Håksberg	2,072	1,610	43.8	54.9	88	90	10	29,261	40
Öraberget	1,588	1,276	46.2	50.9	76	84	16	22,523	17
Source: SVT

== Riksdag elections ==
Year	%	Votes	V	S	MP	C	L	KD	M	SD	NyD	Left	Right
1973	89.0	21,040	9.3	56.6		20.5	5.1	1.2	6.8			65.8	32.4
1976	90.4	22,021	7.8	57.4		19.5	6.3	0.9	7.7			65.2	33.5
1979	90.1	21,727	8.7	59.1		13.2	6.3	1.1	10.9			67.7	30.5
1982	91.1	21,687	8.2	61.7	1.7	11.1	3.5	1.0	12.6			70.0	27.2
1985	89.3	20,718	8.9	59.5	1.7	8.5	9.3		12.0			68.4	29.8
1988	84.9	19,133	9.4	57.4	5.4	8.3	7.7	2.2	9.5			72.1	25.5
1991	85.0	18,880	6.7	53.5	2.6	6.2	6.1	5.2	12.1		6.6	60.1	29.5
1994	86.1	18,636	9.5	60.1	4.8	4.9	4.6	2.4	12.1		1.0	74.4	24.0
1998	80.4	16,620	20.8	46.7	3.6	2.7	2.7	8.5	13.1			71.1	27.0
2002	77.5	15,521	13.2	53.9	3.9	4.6	7.7	5.9	8.9	1.1		71.0	27.1
2006	79.2	15,656	10.0	49.2	3.2	6.1	4.4	4.0	16.6	2.9		62.4	31.1
2010	82.7	16,552	8.2	45.1	5.1	3.9	5.0	3.3	20.7	7.6		58.4	32.9
2014	85.5	16,841	7.6	40.6	4.6	4.1	3.1	2.4	15.4	20.0		52.9	25.0
2018	87.1	16,868	8.3	35.4	2.9	6.6	3.5	4.5	14.1	23.2		53.1	45.3
2022	84.3	16,327	6.2	35.2	2.8	4.6	2.9	4.7	14.1	28.1		48.8	49.8

== Twin Towns & Sister cities ==
Ludvika has three twin towns:

- Bad Honnef, Germany
- Imatra, Finland
- Kontiolahti, Finland

== Sports ==
Many sport teams have their origins in Ludvika Municipality. The soccer teams "Östansbo IS" (ÖIS), "Ludvika FK" (LFK, male) and "IFK Ludvika" (female) come from Ludvika and play in divisions 4 and 3. All three also have junior teams. There is also an ice-hockey team, Ludvika Hockey Förening Lightning. Other teams include ping-pong teams as well as other sports.
